= Electoral results for Brindabella electorate =

This is a list of electoral results for Brindabella electorate in ACT Legislative Assembly elections.

== Election results ==
=== Elections in the 2020s ===
==== 2024 ====
2024 Australian Capital Territory election: Brindabella
Party	Candidate	Votes	%	±%
Quota		9,708		
Liberal	Mark Parton (elected 1)	9,606	16.5	+5.3
Liberal	Deborah Morris (elected 2)	5,780	9.9	+9.9
Liberal	James Daniels	4,062	7.0	+3.1
Liberal	Sandi Mitra	2,906	5.0	+5.0
Liberal	Rosa Harber	2,781	4.8	+4.8
Labor	Caitlin Tough (elected 3)	6,085	10.4	+10.4
Labor	Taimus Werner-Gibbings (elected 4)	4,867	8.4	+0.2
Labor	Mick Gentleman	4,261	7.3	−4.2
Labor	Louise Crossman	2,790	4.8	+4.8
Labor	Brendan Forde	1,693	2.9	−1.7
Greens	Laura Nuttall (elected 5)	3,244	5.6	+2.6
Greens	Sam Nugent	1,140	2.0	+2.0
Greens	Troy Swan	875	1.5	+1.5
Independents for Canberra	Vanessa Picker	2,411	4.1	+4.1
Independents for Canberra	Elise Searson	1,055	1.8	+1.8
Independents for Canberra	Riley Fernandes	953	1.6	+1.6
Family First	Bruce Gartshore	766	1.3	+1.3
Family First	Merle Graham	667	1.1	+1.1
Animal Justice	Robyn Soxsmith	540	0.9	−0.2
Animal Justice	Gareth Ballard	418	0.7	+0.7
First Nation	Wendy Brookman	328	0.6	+0.6
First Nation	Jack McDougall	241	0.4	+0.4
First Nation	Dylan Robb	177	0.3	+0.3
Independent	Emmanuel Ezekiel-Hart	600	1.0	+1.0
Total formal votes		58,246	97.6	−0.6
Informal votes		1,416	2.4	+0.6
Turnout		59,662	88.3	−2.4
Party total votes
Liberal		25,135	43.2	+4.7
Labor		19,696	33.8	−6.9
Greens		5,259	9.0	−1.8
Independents for Canberra		4,419	7.6	+7.6
Family First		1,433	2.5	+2.5
Animal Justice		958	1.6	−0.6
First Nation		746	1.3	+1.3
Independent	Emmanuel Ezekiel-Hart	600	1.0	+1.0
Liberal hold		Swing	+5.3	
Liberal hold		Swing	+9.9	
Labor hold		Swing	+10.4	
Labor hold		Swing	+0.2	
Greens hold		Swing	+2.6	

==== 2020 ====
2020 Australian Capital Territory election: Brindabella
Party	Candidate	Votes	%	±%
Quota		9,236		
Labor	Joy Burch (elected 1)	6,459	11.7	+3.5
Labor	Mick Gentleman (elected 2)	6,395	11.5	+3.1
Labor	Taimus Werner-Gibbings	4,568	8.2	+1.6
Labor	Cathy Day	2,592	4.7	+4.7
Labor	Brendan Forde	2,546	4.6	+4.6
Liberal	Mark Parton (elected 4)	6,218	11.2	+0.6
Liberal	Nicole Lawder (elected 3)	5,866	10.6	+1.7
Liberal	Andrew Wall	4,579	8.3	−3.7
Liberal	Jane Hiatt	2,448	4.4	+4.4
Liberal	James Daniels	2,179	3.9	+3.9
Greens	Johnathan Davis (elected 5)	3,019	5.4	+4.0
Greens	Laura Nuttall	1,657	3.0	+3.0
Greens	Sue Ellerman	1,309	2.4	+2.4
Shooters, Fishers, Farmers	Greg Baynham	894	1.6	+1.6
Shooters, Fishers, Farmers	Adrian Olley	833	1.5	+1.5
Sustainable Australia	Andrew Clapham	763	1.4	+1.4
Sustainable Australia	Bruce Willett	514	0.9	+0.9
Animal Justice	Jannah Fahiz	653	1.2	+1.2
Animal Justice	Robyn Soxsmith	582	1.0	+0.0
Liberal Democrats	Matthew Knight	427	0.8	+0.8
Liberal Democrats	Jacob Gowor	318	0.6	+0.6
Federation	Jason Potter	446	0.8	+0.8
Federation	Scott Sandford	148	0.3	+0.3
Total formal votes		55,413	98.2	+1.1
Informal votes		1,005	1.8	−1.1
Turnout		56,418	90.7	+0.7
Party total votes
Labor		22,560	40.7	+7.1
Liberal		21,290	38.4	−3.4
Greens		5,985	10.8	+5.7
Shooters, Fishers, Farmers		1,727	3.1	+3.1
Sustainable Australia		1,277	2.3	+0.8
Animal Justice		1,235	2.2	−0.1
Liberal Democrats		745	1.3	−1.2
Federation		594	1.1	+1.1
Labor hold		Swing	+3.5	
Labor hold		Swing	+3.1	
Liberal hold		Swing	+0.6	
Liberal hold		Swing	+0.7	
Greens gain from Liberal		Swing	+4.0	

=== Elections in the 2010s ===
==== 2016 ====
2016 Australian Capital Territory election: Brindabella
Party	Candidate	Votes	%	±%
Quota		7,806		
Liberal	Andrew Wall (elected 1)	5,614	12.0	+7.5
Liberal	Mark Parton (elected 4)	4,962	10.6	+10.6
Liberal	Nicole Lawder (elected 5)	4,166	8.9	+5.4
Liberal	Ed Cocks	3,195	6.8	+6.8
Liberal	Annette Fazey-Southwell	1,669	3.6	+3.6
Labor	Mick Gentleman (elected 2)	3,964	8.5	+0.2
Labor	Joy Burch (elected 3)	3,838	8.2	−5.3
Labor	Taimus Werner-Gibbings	3,131	6.7	+6.7
Labor	Angie Drake	2,940	6.3	+6.3
Labor	Karl Maftoum	1,871	4.0	−1.2
Sex Party	Steven Bailey	2,071	4.4	+4.4
Sex Party	Monique Shepherd	1,623	3.5	+3.5
Greens	Michael Mazengarb	1,125	2.4	+2.4
Greens	Johnathan Davis	684	1.5	+0.3
Greens	Ben Murphy	590	1.3	+0.4
Independent	Joel McKay	1,200	2.6	+2.6
Liberal Democrats	Matt Donnelly	284	0.6	+0.6
Liberal Democrats	Greg Renet	261	0.6	+0.6
Liberal Democrats	Jacob Gowor	256	0.5	+0.5
Liberal Democrats	Vera Saragih	205	0.4	+0.4
Liberal Democrats	Matt Straschko	169	0.4	+0.4
Animal Justice	Sarah O'Brien	632	1.3	+1.3
Animal Justice	Robyn Soxsmith	474	1.0	+1.0
Independent	Andrew Holt	767	1.6	+1.6
Sustainable Australia	Melissa Kemp	446	1.0	+1.0
Sustainable Australia	Claude Hastir	251	0.5	+0.5
Like Canberra	Richard Tuffin	231	0.5	+0.5
Like Canberra	Timothy Friel	211	0.5	+0.5
Total formal votes		46,830	97.1	
Informal votes		1,405	2.9	
Turnout		48,235	90.0	
Party total votes
Liberal		19,606	41.9	−4.5
Labor		15,744	33.6	−1.8
Sex Party		3,694	7.9	+7.9
Greens		2,399	5.1	−2.2
Independent	Joel McKay	1,200	2.6	+2.6
Liberal Democrats		1,175	2.5	+2.5
Animal Justice		1,106	2.4	+2.4
Independent	Andrew Holt	767	1.6	+1.6
Sustainable Australia		697	1.5	+1.5
Like Canberra		442	0.9	+0.9
Liberal hold		Swing	+7.5	
Liberal hold		Swing	+10.6	
Liberal hold		Swing	+5.4	
Labor hold		Swing	+0.2	
Labor hold		Swing	–5.3	

==== 2012 ====
2012 Australian Capital Territory election: Brindabella
Party	Candidate	Votes	%	±%
Quota		10,594		
Liberal	Zed Seselja (elected 1)	18,566	29.2	+29.2
Liberal	Brendan Smyth (elected 3)	3,954	6.2	−7.2
Liberal	Andrew Wall (elected 5)	2,477	3.9	+3.9
Liberal	Val Jeffery	2,413	3.8	+3.8
Liberal	Nicole Lawder	2,086	3.3	+3.3
Labor	Joy Burch (elected 2)	9,031	14.2	+6.4
Labor	Mick Gentleman (elected 4)	5,105	8.0	+0.7
Labor	Bec Cody	3,561	5.6	+5.6
Labor	Karl Maftoum	3,029	4.8	+4.8
Labor	Mike Kinniburgh	1,939	3.1	+3.1
Greens	Amanda Bresnan	3,515	5.5	−2.8
Greens	Johnathan Davis	835	1.3	+1.3
Greens	Ben Murphy	682	1.1	+1.1
Motorist	Burl Doble	1,532	2.4	+0.9
Motorist	Kieran Jones-Ellis	956	1.5	+1.5
Bullet Train	Mark Erwood	1,230	1.9	+1.9
Bullet Train	Adam Henschke	1,165	1.8	+1.8
Independent	Michael Lindfield	770	1.2	+1.2
Independent	Calvin Pearce	402	0.6	+0.6
	Mark Gibbons	314	0.5	+0.5
Total formal votes		63,562	96.0	+0.2
Informal votes		2,631	4.0	−0.2
Turnout		66,193	91.5	−1.1
Party total votes
Liberal		29,496	46.4	+11.1
Labor		22,665	35.7	−0.8
Greens		5,032	7.9	−5.7
Motorist		2,488	3.9	−3.1
Bullet Train		2,395	3.8	+3.8
Independent	Michael Lindfield	770	1.2	+1.2
Independent	Calvin Pearce	402	0.6	+0.6
	Mark Gibbons	314	0.5	+0.5

=== Elections in the 2000s ===
==== 2008 ====
2008 Australian Capital Territory election: Brindabella
Party	Candidate	Votes	%	±%
Quota		10,556		
Labor	John Hargreaves (elected 4)	7,038	11.1	−6.7
Labor	Joy Burch (elected 5)	4,965	7.8	+7.8
Labor	Mick Gentleman	4,612	7.3	−0.1
Labor	Tracy Mackey	4,030	6.4	+6.4
Labor	Wayne Sievers	2,478	3.9	+3.9
Liberal	Brendan Smyth (elected 1)	8,458	13.4	−13.4
Liberal	Steve Doszpot (elected 2)	4,980	7.9	+2.1
Liberal	Steve Pratt	3,978	6.3	+0.2
Liberal	David Morgan	3,227	5.1	+5.1
Liberal	Audrey Ray	1,721	2.7	+2.7
Greens	Amanda Bresnan (elected 3)	5,260	8.3	+8.3
Greens	Sue Ellerman	3,340	5.3	+5.3
Community Alliance	Val Jeffery	4,109	6.5	+6.5
Community Alliance	James Sizer	720	1.1	+1.1
Motorist	Burl Doble	1,083	1.7	+1.7
Motorist	Ben Doble	930	1.5	+1.5
Motorist	Brian McLachlan	873	1.4	+1.4
Motorist	Bruce Ritchie	799	1.3	+1.3
Motorist	Geoff Rake	733	1.2	+1.2
Total formal votes		63,334	95.8	−1.5
Informal votes		2,782	4.2	+1.5
Turnout		66,116	92.6	−1.5
Party total votes
Labor		23,123	36.5	−9.2
Liberal		22,364	35.3	−5.1
Greens		8,600	13.6	+6.3
Community Alliance		4,829	7.6	+7.6
Motorist		4,418	7.0	+7.0

==== 2004 ====
2004 Australian Capital Territory election: Brindabella
Party	Candidate	Votes	%	±%
Quota		9,962		
Labor	John Hargreaves (elected 2)	10,634	17.79	+2.58
Labor	Karin MacDonald (elected 3)	4,960	8.30	+1.10
Labor	Mick Gentleman (elected 4)	4,419	7.39	+7.39
Labor	Paschal Leahy	3,752	6.28	+6.28
Labor	Rebecca Logue	3,572	5.98	+5.98
Liberal	Brendan Smyth (elected 1)	12,810	21.43	+5.66
Liberal	Steve Pratt (elected 5)	3,621	6.06	−0.97
Liberal	Steve Doszpot	3,483	5.83	+2.32
Liberal	Megan Purcell	2,229	3.73	+3.73
Liberal	Karen Schilling	1,987	3.32	+3.32
Greens	Kathryn Kelly	2,345	3.92	+0.77
Greens	Graham Jensen	1,991	3.32	+3.32
Christian Democrats	Thelma Janes	766	1.28	+1.28
Christian Democrats	Erol Francis Byrne	604	1.01	+1.01
Democrats	Rowena Bew	524	0.88	+0.88
Democrats	Marc Emerson	400	0.67	+0.67
Independent	Burl Doble	782	1.31	+1.31
Liberal Democrats	David Garrett	233	0.39	+0.39
Liberal Democrats	Matthew Harding	209	0.35	+0.35
Free Range Canberra	Stephanie Elliott	348	0.58	+0.58
ACT Equality Party	Lance Muir	100	0.17	+0.17
Total formal votes		59,769	97.26	+1.67
Informal votes		1,682	2.74	−1.67
Turnout		61,451	94.14	+1.64
Party total votes
Labor		27,337	45.74	+1.77
Liberal		24,130	40.37	+8.51
Greens		4,336	7.25	+1.82
Christian Democrats		1,370	2.29	+2.29
Democrats		924	1.55	−5.41
Independent	Burl Doble	782	1.31	+1.31
Liberal Democrats		442	0.74	+0.22
Free Range Canberra		348	0.58	+0.58
ACT Equality Party		100	0.17	+0.17
Labor hold		Swing	+2.58	
Labor hold		Swing	+1.10	
Labor hold		Swing	+7.39	
Liberal hold		Swing	+5.66	
Liberal hold		Swing	−0.97	

==== 2001 ====
2001 Australian Capital Territory election: Brindabella
Party	Candidate	Votes	%	±%
Quota		9,435		
Labor	John Hargreaves (elected 2)	8,609	15.21	+9.22
Labor	Bill Wood (elected 3)	6,828	12.06	+2.90
Labor	Karin MacDonald (elected 5)	4,074	7.20	+7.20
Labor	Trevor Santi	3,039	5.37	+5.37
Labor	Athol Williams	2,341	4.14	+4.14
Liberal	Brendan Smyth (elected 1)	8,926	15.77	−0.74
Liberal	Steve Pratt (elected 4)	3,981	7.03	+7.03
Liberal	Steve Doszpot	1,988	3.51	+3.51
Liberal	Megan O'Connor	1,890	3.34	+3.34
Liberal	Winnifred Rosser	1,250	2.21	+2.21
Democrats	Jeannette Jolley	1,754	3.10	+3.10
Democrats	Domenic Mico	1,369	2.42	+2.42
Democrats	Mike Welch	815	1.44	+1.44
Paul Osborne	Paul Osborne	3,732	6.59	−9.36
Paul Osborne	Donna Bush	156	0.28	+0.28
Greens	Kathryn Kelly	1,784	3.15	+3.15
Greens	Sue Ellerman	1,290	2.28	+0.25
Nurses	Maria Trudinger	950	1.68	+1.68
Kaine Independent Group	Trevor Kaine	524	0.93	−5.38
Kaine Independent Group	Sandie Brooke	112	0.20	+0.20
Independent	Bruce Sutherland	455	0.80	+0.80
Liberal Democrats	Darren Kennedy	153	0.27	+0.27
Liberal Democrats	Bradley Brown	144	0.25	+0.25
Independent	Len Munday	252	0.45	+0.45
Group F	May Levantis	71	0.13	+0.13
Group F	Bob Mackenzie	57	0.10	+0.10
Independent	Danny Alameddine	60	0.11	+0.11
Total formal votes		56,604	95.59	−0.06
Informal votes		2,612	4.41	+0.06
Turnout		59,216	92.50	−0.42
Party total votes
Labor		24,891	43.97	+15.47
Liberal		18,035	31.86	−5.21
Democrats		3,938	6.96	+0.81
Paul Osborne		3,888	6.87	−9.36
Greens		3,074	5.43	−2.65
Nurses		950	1.68	+1.68
Kaine Independent Group		636	1.12	+1.12
Independent	Bruce Sutherland	455	0.80	+0.80
Liberal Democrats		297	0.52	+0.52
Independent	Len Munday	252	0.45	+0.45
Group F		128	0.23	+0.23
Independent	Danny Alameddine	60	0.11	+0.11
Labor hold		Swing	+9.22	
Labor hold		Swing	+2.90	
Labor gain from Independent		Swing	+7.20	
Liberal hold		Swing	−0.74	
Liberal hold		Swing	+7.03	

=== Elections in the 1990s ===
==== 1998 ====
1998 Australian Capital Territory election: Brindabella
Party	Candidate	Votes	%	±%
Quota		9,042		
Liberal	Brendan Smyth (elected 1)	8,956	16.51	+16.51
Liberal	Louise Littlewood	3,918	7.22	+1.37
Liberal	Trevor Kaine (elected 4)	3,422	6.31	−2.61
Liberal	Geoff Didier	2,149	3.96	+3.96
Liberal	Margaret L. Head	1,665	3.07	+3.07
Labor	Bill Wood (elected 3)	4,971	9.16	+0.18
Labor	Andrew Whitecross	3,893	7.18	−4.17
Labor	John Hargreaves (elected 5)	3,252	5.99	+5.99
Labor	Karen Mow	1,775	3.27	+3.27
Labor	Kathryn Presdee	1,572	2.90	+2.90
Osborne Independent Group	Paul Osborne (elected 2)	8,273	15.25	+4.02
Osborne Independent Group	Linda Moore	531	0.98	+0.98
Greens	Fiona Tito	1,659	3.06	+3.06
Greens	Sue Ellerman	1,103	2.03	+2.03
Greens	Liz Stephens	888	1.64	−0.24
Greens	Peter Farrelly	733	1.64	+1.64
Democrats	Anna Grant	909	1.68	+1.68
Democrats	Charlie Bell	811	1.49	+0.18
Democrats	Adele Tait	579	1.07	+1.07
Democrats	Geoff Dodd	549	1.01	+1.01
Democrats	Mark Peirce	488	0.90	+0.90
Christian Democrats	Francis Piccin	547	1.01	+1.01
Christian Democrats	Stephen Carter	364	0.67	+0.67
Independent	Margaret A. Kobier	381	0.70	−0.75
Independent	Margot Marshall	261	0.48	+0.48
Independent	Peter Menegazzo	238	0.44	+0.44
Independent	Leonard Munday	230	0.42	+0.42
Independent	Tom Cornwell	134	0.25	+0.25
Total formal votes		54,251	95.65	+1.88
Informal votes		2,467	4.35	−1.88
Turnout		56,718	92.92	+1.69
Party total votes
Liberal		20,110	37.07	+0.01
Labor		15,463	28.50	−3.08
Osborne Independent Group		8,804	16.23	+5.00
Greens		4,383	8.08	+0.13
Democrats		3,336	6.15	+2.39
Christian Democrats		911	1.68	+1.68
Independent	Margaret A. Kobier	381	0.70	−0.75
Independent	Margot Marshall	261	0.48	+0.48
Independent	Peter Menegazzo	238	0.44	+0.44
Independent	Leonard Munday	230	0.42	+0.42
Independent	Tom Cornwell	134	0.25	+0.25
Liberal hold		Swing	+16.51	
Liberal hold		Swing	−2.61	
Labor hold		Swing	+0.18	
Labor hold		Swing	+5.99	
Osborne Independent Group hold		Swing	+4.02	

==== 1995 ====
1995 Australian Capital Territory election: Brindabella
Party	Candidate	Votes	%	±%
Quota		8,317		
Liberal	Tony De Domenico (elected 1)	6,262	12.55	NA
Liberal	Trevor Kaine (elected 2)	4,449	8.92	NA
Liberal	Louise Littlewood	2,919	5.85	NA
Liberal	Brian Lowe	2,682	5.38	NA
Liberal	Sandie Brooke	2,182	4.37	NA
Labor	Andrew Whitecross (elected 4)	5,665	11.35	NA
Labor	Bill Wood (elected 5)	4,482	8.98	NA
Labor	Annette Ellis	3,142	6.30	NA
Labor	Steve Whan	1,263	2.53	NA
Labor	Eva Cawthorne	1,206	2.42	NA
Independent	Paul Osborne (elected 5)	5,604	11.23	NA
Greens	Andrew Parratt	2,071	4.15	NA
Greens	Julie McInness	956	1.92	NA
Greens	Liz Stephens	938	1.88	NA
Moore Independents	Stephanie Isaacson	1,025	2.05	NA
Moore Independents	Nick Isaacson	882	1.77	NA
Democrats	Lyn Forceville	1,225	2.46	NA
Democrats	Charlie Bell	653	1.31	NA
Smokers Are Voters And Civil Rights	Stan Kowalski	602	1.21	NA
Smokers Are Voters And Civil Rights	Keith Dencio	514	1.03	NA
Independent	Margaret Kobier	726	1.45	NA
Independent	Tony Savage	344	0.69	NA
Independent	Janice Ferguson	105	0.21	NA
Total formal votes		49,897	93.77	NA
Informal votes		3,317	6.23	NA
Turnout		53,214	91.23	NA
Party total votes
Liberal		18,494	37.06	NA
Labor		15,758	31.58	NA
Independent	Paul Osborne	5,604	11.23	NA
Greens		3,965	7.95	NA
Moore Independents		1,907	3.82	NA
Democrats		1,878	3.76	NA
Smokers Are Voters And Civil Rights		1,116	2.24	NA
Independent	Margaret Kobier	726	1.45	NA
Independent	Tony Savage	344	0.69	NA
Independent	Janice Ferguson	105	0.21	NA
Liberal win		(new seat)		
Liberal win		(new seat)		
Labor win		(new seat)		
Labor win		(new seat)		
Independent win		(new seat)		
