= Results of the 2008 Australian Capital Territory election =

Australian Capital Territory election, 18 October 2008 Legislative Assembly << 2004–2012 >>
Enrolled voters	243,471				
Votes cast	220,019		Turnout	90.4%	−2.4
Informal votes	8,370		Informal	3.8%	+1.1
Summary of votes by party
Party	Primary votes	%	Swing	Seats	Change
Labor	79,126	37.4	−9.4	7	−2
Liberal	66,855	31.6	−3.2	6	–1
Greens	33,057	15.6	+6.3	4	+3
Motorist	10,553	5.0	+5.0	0	0
Community Alliance	7,730	3.7	+3.7	0	0
Independent	6,961	3.3	+1.5	0	0
Pangallo Independents	4,252	2.0	+2.0	0	0
Mulcahy Canberra Party	2,341	1.1	+1.1	0	0
Liberal Democrats	774	0.4	−0.9	0	0
Total	211,649			17	

This is a list of Legislative Assembly results for the 2008 Australian Capital Territory election.

== Results by electorate ==
=== Brindabella ===
2008 Australian Capital Territory election: Brindabella
Party	Candidate	Votes	%	±%
Quota		10,556		
Labor	John Hargreaves (elected 4)	7,038	11.1	−6.7
Labor	Joy Burch (elected 5)	4,965	7.8	+7.8
Labor	Mick Gentleman	4,612	7.3	−0.1
Labor	Tracy Mackey	4,030	6.4	+6.4
Labor	Wayne Sievers	2,478	3.9	+3.9
Liberal	Brendan Smyth (elected 1)	8,458	13.4	−13.4
Liberal	Steve Doszpot (elected 2)	4,980	7.9	+2.1
Liberal	Steve Pratt	3,978	6.3	+0.2
Liberal	David Morgan	3,227	5.1	+5.1
Liberal	Audrey Ray	1,721	2.7	+2.7
Greens	Amanda Bresnan (elected 3)	5,260	8.3	+8.3
Greens	Sue Ellerman	3,340	5.3	+5.3
Community Alliance	Val Jeffery	4,109	6.5	+6.5
Community Alliance	James Sizer	720	1.1	+1.1
Motorist	Burl Doble	1,083	1.7	+1.7
Motorist	Ben Doble	930	1.5	+1.5
Motorist	Brian McLachlan	873	1.4	+1.4
Motorist	Bruce Ritchie	799	1.3	+1.3
Motorist	Geoff Rake	733	1.2	+1.2
Total formal votes		63,334	95.8	−1.5
Informal votes		2,782	4.2	+1.5
Turnout		66,116	92.6	−1.5
Party total votes
Labor		23,123	36.5	−9.2
Liberal		22,364	35.3	−5.1
Greens		8,600	13.6	+6.3
Community Alliance		4,829	7.6	+7.6
Motorist		4,418	7.0	+7.0

=== Ginninderra ===
2008 Australian Capital Territory election: Ginninderra
Party	Candidate	Votes	%	±%
Quota		10,009		
Labor	Jon Stanhope (elected 1)	13,461	22.4	−14.5
Labor	Mary Porter (elected 4)	3,719	6.2	+2.4
Labor	Adina Cirson	2,797	4.7	+4.7
Labor	David Peebles	2,711	4.5	+4.5
Labor	Chris Bourke	1,431	2.4	+2.4
Liberal	Alistair Coe (elected 3)	5,886	9.8	+9.8
Liberal	Vicki Dunne (elected 5)	4,237	7.1	+1.4
Liberal	Andrea Tokaji	2,553	4.3	+4.3
Liberal	Jacqui Myers	2,460	4.1	+4.1
Liberal	Matthew Watts	1,547	2.6	+2.6
Greens	Meredith Hunter (elected 2)	6,104	10.2	+5.1
Greens	James Higgins	2,246	3.7	+3.7
Independent	Mark Parton	3,785	6.3	+6.3
Motorist	Denis Walford	1,020	1.7	+1.7
Motorist	Andrew Simington	835	1.4	+1.4
Motorist	Chris Seddon	694	1.2	+1.2
Motorist	Wayne Whiting	622	1.0	+1.0
Motorist	Deborah Hannigan	513	0.9	+0.9
Community Alliance	Roger Nicoll	791	1.3	+1.3
Community Alliance	Jane Tullis	782	1.3	+1.3
Community Alliance	Mike Crowther	324	0.5	+0.5
Independent	Harold Hird	712	1.2	−0.8
Independent	Cathy McIlhoney	247	0.4	+0.4
	Darren Churchill	192	0.3	+0.3
Independent	Adam Verwey	170	0.3	+0.3
Independent	Barry Smith	118	0.2	+0.2
	Eddie Sarkis	92	0.2	+0.2
Total formal votes		60,049	96.0	−0.3
Informal votes		2,503	4.0	+0.3
Turnout		62,552	91.5	−2.1
Party total votes
Labor		24,119	40.2	−9.2
Liberal		16,683	27.8	−4.6
Greens		8,350	13.9	+5.7
Independent	Mark Parton	3,785	6.3	+6.3
Motorist		3,684	6.1	+6.1
Community Alliance		1,897	3.2	+3.2
Independent	Harold Hird	712	1.2	−0.8
Independent	Cathy McIlhoney	247	0.4	+0.4
	Darren Churchill	192	0.3	+0.3
Independent	Adam Verwey	170	0.3	+0.3
Independent	Barry Smith	118	0.2	+0.2
	Eddie Sarkis	92	0.2	+0.2

=== Molonglo ===
2008 Australian Capital Territory election: Molonglo
Party	Candidate	Votes	%	±%
Quota		11,034		
Labor	Katy Gallagher (elected 2)	13,931	15.8	+4.2
Labor	Andrew Barr (elected 4)	5,495	6.2	+2.4
Labor	Simon Corbell (elected 6)	4,590	5.2	−4.8
Labor	Mike Hettinger	2,822	3.2	−0.8
Labor	David Mathews	2,042	2.3	+2.3
Labor	Eleanor Bates	1,625	1.8	+1.8
Labor	Louise Crossman	1,379	1.6	+1.6
Liberal	Zed Seselja (elected 1)	16,739	19.0	+12.9
Liberal	Jeremy Hanson (elected 5)	3,278	3.7	+3.7
Liberal	Giulia Jones	2,252	2.6	+2.6
Liberal	Gary Kent	1,688	1.9	+1.9
Liberal	Jacqui Burke	1,548	1.8	−4.1
Liberal	Belinda Barnier	1,249	1.4	+1.4
Liberal	Clinton White	1,054	1.2	+1.2
Greens	Shane Rattenbury (elected 3)	9,564	10.8	+10.8
Greens	Caroline Le Couteur (elected 7)	3,334	3.8	+3.8
Greens	Elena Kirschbaum	3,209	3.6	+3.6
Pangallo Independents	Frank Pangallo	3,513	4.0	+4.0
Pangallo Independents	Phil Thompson	396	0.4	+0.4
Pangallo Independents	Luciano Lombardo	343	0.4	+0.4
Motorist	David Cumbers	493	0.6	+0.6
Motorist	Anthony Seddon	366	0.4	+0.4
Motorist	Stuart Green	361	0.4	+0.4
Motorist	Kim Evans	356	0.4	+0.4
Motorist	Stephen Rowland	322	0.4	+0.4
Motorist	Darren O'Neil	310	0.4	+0.4
Motorist	Angus Laburn	243	0.3	+0.3
Canberra Party	Richard Mulcahy	2,057	2.3	+2.3
Canberra Party	Ben O'Neill	148	0.2	+0.2
Canberra Party	Joanne Allen	136	0.2	+0.2
Independent	Helen Cross	1,120	1.3	−1.6
Community Alliance	Norvan Vogt	586	0.7	+0.7
Community Alliance	Owen Saddler	151	0.2	+0.2
Community Alliance	Nancy-Louise Scherger	135	0.2	+0.2
Community Alliance	Alvin Hopper	132	0.1	+0.1
Liberal Democrats	David McAlary	398	0.5	+0.5
Liberal Democrats	David Pinkerton	376	0.4	+0.4
	Greg Tannahill	202	0.2	+0.2
Independent	Tony Farrell	172	0.2	+0.0
Independent	Kerri Taranto	151	0.2	+0.2
Total formal votes		88,266	96.6	−0.9
Informal votes		3,085	3.4	+0.9
Turnout		91,351	88.1	−3.2
Party total votes
Labor		31,884	36.1	−9.2
Liberal		27,808	31.5	−1.1
Greens		16,107	18.2	+6.7
Pangallo Independents		4,252	4.8	+4.8
Motorist		2,451	2.8	+2.8
Canberra Party		2,341	2.7	+2.7
Independent	Helen Cross	1,120	1.3	−1.6
Community Alliance		1,004	1.1	+1.1
Liberal Democrats		774	0.9	−0.9
	Greg Tannahill	202	0.2	+0.2
Independent	Tony Farrell	172	0.2	+0.0
Independent	Kerri Taranto	151	0.2	+0.2

== See also ==
- Members of the Australian Capital Territory Legislative Assembly, 2008–2012
- List of Australian Capital Territory elections
