= Results of the 2012 Australian Capital Territory election =

Australian Capital Territory election, 20 October 2012 Legislative Assembly << 2008–2016 >>
| Enrolled voters | 256,702 | | | | |
| Votes cast | 229,125 | | Turnout | 89.3% | |
| Informal votes | 7,953 | | Informal | 3.5% | |
Summary of votes by party
| Party | Primary votes | % | Swing | Seats | Change |
| Liberal | 86,032 | 38.9 | +7.3 | 8 | +2 |
| Labor | 85,991 | 38.9 | +1.5 | 8 | +1 |
| Greens | 23,773 | 10.7 | −4.9 | 1 | -3 |
| Motorist | 9,179 | 4.2 | −0.8 | 0 | 0 |
| Bullet Train | 8,864 | 4.0 | +4.0 | 0 | 0 |
| Independent | 4,053 | 1.8 | −8.3 | 0 | 0 |
| Liberal Democratic Party | 2,340 | 1.1 | +0.7 | 0 | 0 |
| Marion Lê Social Justice | 940 | 0.4 | +0.4 | 0 | 0 |
| Total | 221,172 | | | 17 | |

This is a list of Legislative Assembly results for the 2012 Australian Capital Territory election.

== Results by electorate ==
=== Brindabella ===
2012 Australian Capital Territory election: Brindabella
| Party | Candidate | Votes | % | ±% |
|---|---|---|---|---|
| Quota | | 10,594 | | |
| Liberal | Zed Seselja (elected 1) | 18,566 | 29.2 | +29.2 |
| Liberal | Brendan Smyth (elected 3) | 3,954 | 6.2 | −7.2 |
| Liberal | Andrew Wall (elected 5) | 2,477 | 3.9 | +3.9 |
| Liberal | Val Jeffery | 2,413 | 3.8 | +3.8 |
| Liberal | Nicole Lawder | 2,086 | 3.3 | +3.3 |
| Labor | Joy Burch (elected 2) | 9,031 | 14.2 | +6.4 |
| Labor | Mick Gentleman (elected 4) | 5,105 | 8.0 | +0.7 |
| Labor | Bec Cody | 3,561 | 5.6 | +5.6 |
| Labor | Karl Maftoum | 3,029 | 4.8 | +4.8 |
| Labor | Mike Kinniburgh | 1,939 | 3.1 | +3.1 |
| Greens | Amanda Bresnan | 3,515 | 5.5 | −2.8 |
| Greens | Johnathan Davis | 835 | 1.3 | +1.3 |
| Greens | Ben Murphy | 682 | 1.1 | +1.1 |
| Motorist | Burl Doble | 1,532 | 2.4 | +0.9 |
| Motorist | Kieran Jones-Ellis | 956 | 1.5 | +1.5 |
| Bullet Train | Mark Erwood | 1,230 | 1.9 | +1.9 |
| Bullet Train | Adam Henschke | 1,165 | 1.8 | +1.8 |
| Independent | Michael Lindfield | 770 | 1.2 | +1.2 |
| Independent | Calvin Pearce | 402 | 0.6 | +0.6 |
| | Mark Gibbons | 314 | 0.5 | +0.5 |
| Total formal votes | | 63,562 | 96.0 | +0.2 |
| Informal votes | | 2,631 | 4.0 | −0.2 |
| Turnout | | 66,193 | 91.5 | −1.1 |
Party total votes
| Liberal | | 29,496 | 46.4 | +11.1 |
| Labor | | 22,665 | 35.7 | −0.8 |
| Greens | | 5,032 | 7.9 | −5.7 |
| Motorist | | 2,488 | 3.9 | −3.1 |
| Bullet Train | | 2,395 | 3.8 | +3.8 |
| Independent | Michael Lindfield | 770 | 1.2 | +1.2 |
| Independent | Calvin Pearce | 402 | 0.6 | +0.6 |
| | Mark Gibbons | 314 | 0.5 | +0.5 |

=== Ginninderra ===
2012 Australian Capital Territory election: Ginninderra
| Party | Candidate | Votes | % | ±% |
|---|---|---|---|---|
| Quota | | 11,013 | | |
| Labor | Mary Porter (elected 3) | 9,423 | 14.3 | +8.1 |
| Labor | Chris Bourke (elected 4) | 5,048 | 7.6 | +5.2 |
| Labor | Yvette Berry (elected 5) | 4,917 | 7.4 | +7.4 |
| Labor | Glen McCrea | 4,153 | 6.3 | +6.3 |
| Labor | Jayson Hinder | 2,813 | 4.3 | +4.3 |
| Liberal | Alistair Coe (elected 1) | 10,017 | 15.2 | +5.4 |
| Liberal | Vicki Dunne (elected 2) | 5,167 | 7.8 | +0.7 |
| Liberal | Jacob Vadakkedathu | 2,820 | 4.3 | +4.3 |
| Liberal | Matt Watts | 2,750 | 4.2 | +1.6 |
| Liberal | Merinda Nash | 1,521 | 2.3 | +2.3 |
| Greens | Meredith Hunter | 4,462 | 6.8 | −3.4 |
| Greens | Hannah Parris | 1,137 | 1.7 | +1.7 |
| Greens | James Higgins | 1,077 | 1.6 | −2.1 |
| Motorist | Chic Henry | 4,360 | 6.6 | +6.6 |
| Motorist | Darryl Walford | 434 | 0.7 | −1.0 |
| Bullet Train | Chris Bucknell | 1,262 | 1.9 | +1.9 |
| Bullet Train | Tony Halton | 1,096 | 1.7 | +1.7 |
| Liberal Democrats | Matt Thompson | 819 | 1.2 | +1.2 |
| Liberal Democrats | Mustafa Jawadi | 394 | 0.6 | +0.6 |
| Lê Social Justice | Marion Lê | 532 | 0.8 | +0.8 |
| Lê Social Justice | Nehmat Nana Jbeili | 162 | 0.2 | +0.2 |
| Lê Social Justice | Kate Reynolds | 105 | 0.2 | +0.2 |
| Lê Social Justice | Karamia Lê | 80 | 0.1 | +0.1 |
| Lê Social Justice | Majlinda Bitani | 61 | 0.1 | +0.1 |
| Independent | Emmanuel Ezekiel-Hart | 589 | 0.9 | +0.9 |
| Independent | Norm Gingell | 454 | 0.7 | +0.7 |
| | Glen Takkenberg | 279 | 0.4 | +0.4 |
| | Darren Churchill | 144 | 0.2 | −0.1 |
| Total formal votes | | 66,076 | 96.3 | +0.3 |
| Informal votes | | 2,569 | 3.7 | −0.3 |
| Turnout | | 68,645 | 90.2 | −1.3 |
Party total votes
| Labor | | 26,354 | 39.9 | −0.3 |
| Liberal | | 22,275 | 33.7 | +5.9 |
| Greens | | 6,676 | 10.1 | −3.8 |
| Motorist | | 4,794 | 7.3 | +1.2 |
| Bullet Train | | 2,358 | 3.6 | +3.6 |
| Liberal Democrats | | 1,213 | 1.8 | +1.8 |
| Lê Social Justice | | 940 | 1.4 | +1.4 |
| Independent | Emmanuel Ezekiel-Hart | 589 | 0.9 | +0.9 |
| Independent | Norm Gingell | 454 | 0.7 | +0.7 |
| | Glen Takkenberg | 279 | 0.4 | +0.4 |
| | Darren Churchill | 144 | 0.2 | −0.1 |

=== Molonglo ===
2012 Australian Capital Territory election: Molonglo
| Party | Candidate | Votes | % | ±% |
|---|---|---|---|---|
| Quota | | 11,442 | | |
| Labor | Katy Gallagher (elected 1) | 23,996 | 26.2 | +10.4 |
| Labor | Andrew Barr (elected 3) | 3,880 | 4.2 | −2.0 |
| Labor | Meegan Fitzharris | 2,626 | 2.9 | +2.9 |
| Labor | Simon Corbell (elected 4) | 1,909 | 2.1 | −3.1 |
| Labor | Mark Kulasingham | 1,749 | 1.9 | +1.9 |
| Labor | David Mathews | 1,408 | 1.5 | −0.8 |
| Labor | Angie Drake | 1,404 | 1.5 | +1.5 |
| Liberal | Jeremy Hanson (elected 2) | 10,235 | 11.2 | +7.5 |
| Liberal | Giulia Jones (elected 6) | 5,754 | 6.3 | +3.7 |
| Liberal | Steve Doszpot (elected 7) | 5,245 | 5.7 | +5.7 |
| Liberal | Elizabeth Lee | 4,459 | 4.9 | +4.9 |
| Liberal | Tom Sefton | 3,834 | 4.2 | +4.2 |
| Liberal | James Milligan | 2,984 | 3.3 | +3.3 |
| Liberal | Murray Gordon | 1,750 | 1.9 | +1.9 |
| Greens | Shane Rattenbury (elected 5) | 4,966 | 5.4 | −5.4 |
| Greens | Caroline Le Couteur | 4,531 | 5.0 | +1.2 |
| Greens | Adriana Siddle | 1,395 | 1.5 | +1.5 |
| Greens | Alan Kerlin | 1,173 | 1.3 | +1.3 |
| Bullet Train | Tim Bohm | 2,218 | 2.4 | +2.4 |
| Bullet Train | Shelley Dickerson | 1,893 | 2.1 | +2.1 |
| Motorist | David Cumbers | 975 | 1.1 | +0.5 |
| Motorist | Mark Curran | 922 | 1.0 | +1.0 |
| Liberal Democrats | Ian Gardner | 610 | 0.7 | +0.7 |
| Liberal Democrats | Trisha Jha | 517 | 0.6 | +0.6 |
| Independent | Philip Pocock | 651 | 0.7 | +0.7 |
| | Stuart Biggs | 450 | 0.5 | +0.5 |
| Total formal votes | | 91,534 | 97.1 | +0.5 |
| Informal votes | | 2,753 | 2.9 | −0.5 |
| Turnout | | 94,287 | 87.1 | −1.0 |
Party total votes
| Labor | | 36,972 | 40.4 | +4.3 |
| Liberal | | 34,261 | 37.4 | +5.9 |
| Greens | | 12,065 | 13.2 | −5.0 |
| Bullet Train | | 4,111 | 4.5 | +4.5 |
| Motorist | | 1,897 | 2.1 | –0.7 |
| Liberal Democrats | | 1,127 | 1.2 | +0.3 |
| Independent | Philip Pocock | 651 | 0.7 | +0.9 |
| | Stuart Biggs | 450 | 0.5 | +0.5 |

== See also ==
- Members of the Australian Capital Territory Legislative Assembly, 2012–2016
- List of Australian Capital Territory elections
