= Electoral results for Molonglo electorate =

This is a list of electoral results for Molonglo electorate in the Australian Capital Territory Legislative Assembly elections.

== Election results ==
=== Elections in the 2010s ===
==== 2012 ====
2012 Australian Capital Territory election: Molonglo
Party	Candidate	Votes	%	±%
Quota		11,442		
Labor	Katy Gallagher (elected 1)	23,996	26.2	+10.4
Labor	Andrew Barr (elected 3)	3,880	4.2	−2.0
Labor	Meegan Fitzharris	2,626	2.9	+2.9
Labor	Simon Corbell (elected 4)	1,909	2.1	−3.1
Labor	Mark Kulasingham	1,749	1.9	+1.9
Labor	David Mathews	1,408	1.5	−0.8
Labor	Angie Drake	1,404	1.5	+1.5
Liberal	Jeremy Hanson (elected 2)	10,235	11.2	+7.5
Liberal	Giulia Jones (elected 6)	5,754	6.3	+3.7
Liberal	Steve Doszpot (elected 7)	5,245	5.7	+5.7
Liberal	Elizabeth Lee	4,459	4.9	+4.9
Liberal	Tom Sefton	3,834	4.2	+4.2
Liberal	James Milligan	2,984	3.3	+3.3
Liberal	Murray Gordon	1,750	1.9	+1.9
Greens	Shane Rattenbury (elected 5)	4,966	5.4	−5.4
Greens	Caroline Le Couteur	4,531	5.0	+1.2
Greens	Adriana Siddle	1,395	1.5	+1.5
Greens	Alan Kerlin	1,173	1.3	+1.3
Bullet Train	Tim Bohm	2,218	2.4	+2.4
Bullet Train	Shelley Dickerson	1,893	2.1	+2.1
Motorist	David Cumbers	975	1.1	+0.5
Motorist	Mark Curran	922	1.0	+1.0
Liberal Democrats	Ian Gardner	610	0.7	+0.7
Liberal Democrats	Trisha Jha	517	0.6	+0.6
Independent	Philip Pocock	651	0.7	+0.7
	Stuart Biggs	450	0.5	+0.5
Total formal votes		91,534	97.1	+0.5
Informal votes		2,753	2.9	−0.5
Turnout		94,287	87.1	−1.0
Party total votes
Labor		36,972	40.4	+4.3
Liberal		34,261	37.4	+5.9
Greens		12,065	13.2	−5.0
Bullet Train		4,111	4.5	+4.5
Motorist		1,897	2.1	–0.7
Liberal Democrats		1,127	1.2	+0.3
Independent	Philip Pocock	651	0.7	+0.9
	Stuart Biggs	450	0.5	+0.5

=== Elections in the 2000s ===
==== 2008 ====
2008 Australian Capital Territory election: Molonglo
Party	Candidate	Votes	%	±%
Quota		11,034		
Labor	Katy Gallagher (elected 2)	13,931	15.8	+4.2
Labor	Andrew Barr (elected 4)	5,495	6.2	+2.4
Labor	Simon Corbell (elected 6)	4,590	5.2	−4.8
Labor	Mike Hettinger	2,822	3.2	−0.8
Labor	David Mathews	2,042	2.3	+2.3
Labor	Eleanor Bates	1,625	1.8	+1.8
Labor	Louise Crossman	1,379	1.6	+1.6
Liberal	Zed Seselja (elected 1)	16,739	19.0	+12.9
Liberal	Jeremy Hanson (elected 5)	3,278	3.7	+3.7
Liberal	Giulia Jones	2,252	2.6	+2.6
Liberal	Gary Kent	1,688	1.9	+1.9
Liberal	Jacqui Burke	1,548	1.8	−4.1
Liberal	Belinda Barnier	1,249	1.4	+1.4
Liberal	Clinton White	1,054	1.2	+1.2
Greens	Shane Rattenbury (elected 3)	9,564	10.8	+10.8
Greens	Caroline Le Couteur (elected 7)	3,334	3.8	+3.8
Greens	Elena Kirschbaum	3,209	3.6	+3.6
Pangallo Independents	Frank Pangallo	3,513	4.0	+4.0
Pangallo Independents	Phil Thompson	396	0.4	+0.4
Pangallo Independents	Luciano Lombardo	343	0.4	+0.4
Motorist	David Cumbers	493	0.6	+0.6
Motorist	Anthony Seddon	366	0.4	+0.4
Motorist	Stuart Green	361	0.4	+0.4
Motorist	Kim Evans	356	0.4	+0.4
Motorist	Stephen Rowland	322	0.4	+0.4
Motorist	Darren O'Neil	310	0.4	+0.4
Motorist	Angus Laburn	243	0.3	+0.3
Canberra Party	Richard Mulcahy	2,057	2.3	+2.3
Canberra Party	Ben O'Neill	148	0.2	+0.2
Canberra Party	Joanne Allen	136	0.2	+0.2
Independent	Helen Cross	1,120	1.3	−1.6
Community Alliance	Norvan Vogt	586	0.7	+0.7
Community Alliance	Owen Saddler	151	0.2	+0.2
Community Alliance	Nancy-Louise Scherger	135	0.2	+0.2
Community Alliance	Alvin Hopper	132	0.1	+0.1
Liberal Democrats	David McAlary	398	0.5	+0.5
Liberal Democrats	David Pinkerton	376	0.4	+0.4
	Greg Tannahill	202	0.2	+0.2
Independent	Tony Farrell	172	0.2	+0.0
Independent	Kerri Taranto	151	0.2	+0.2
Total formal votes		88,266	96.6	−0.9
Informal votes		3,085	3.4	+0.9
Turnout		91,351	88.1	−3.2
Party total votes
Labor		31,884	36.1	−9.2
Liberal		27,808	31.5	−1.1
Greens		16,107	18.2	+6.7
Pangallo Independents		4,252	4.8	+4.8
Motorist		2,451	2.8	+2.8
Canberra Party		2,341	2.7	+2.7
Independent	Helen Cross	1,120	1.3	−1.6
Community Alliance		1,004	1.1	+1.1
Liberal Democrats		774	0.9	−0.9
	Greg Tannahill	202	0.2	+0.2
Independent	Tony Farrell	172	0.2	+0.0
Independent	Kerri Taranto	151	0.2	+0.2

==== 2004 ====
2004 Australian Capital Territory election: Molonglo
Party	Candidate	Votes	%	±%
Quota		10,628		
Labor	Ted Quinlan (elected 2)	10,098	11.88	+2.54
Labor	Katy Gallagher (elected 1)	9,856	11.59	+7.21
Labor	Simon Corbell (elected 3)	8,465	9.96	−0.64
Labor	Mike Hettinger	3,405	4.01	+4.01
Labor	Andrew Barr	3,219	3.79	+3.79
Labor	Kim Sattler	2,058	2.42	+2.42
Labor	Adina Cirson	1,415	1.66	+1.66
Liberal	Richard Mulcahy (elected 5)	6,583	7.74	+7.74
Liberal	Zed Seselja (elected 7)	5,159	6.07	+6.07
Liberal	Jacqui Burke (elected 6)	4,983	5.86	+3.61
Liberal	Lucille Bailie	3,459	4.07	+4.07
Liberal	David Kibbey	2,691	3.17	+3.17
Liberal	Ron Forrester	2,418	2.84	+2.84
Liberal	Gordon Scott	2,391	2.81	+2.81
Greens	Deb Foskey (elected 4)	3,938	4.63	+3.79
Greens	Charlie Pahlman	2,978	3.50	+3.50
Greens	Amanda Bresnan	2,860	3.36	+3.36
Helen Cross Independents	Helen Cross	2,490	2.93	−0.07
Helen Cross Independents	Renee Stramandinoli	118	0.14	+0.14
Independent	Ken Helm	2,202	2.59	+2.59
Liberal Democrats	John Humphreys	1,168	1.37	+1.37
Liberal Democrats	Melanie Sutcliffe	333	0.39	+0.39
Democrats	Robert Rose	678	0.80	+0.80
Democrats	Fred Leftwich	550	0.65	−2.31
Free Range Canberra	Simone Gray	336	0.40	+0.40
Free Range Canberra	Jo McKinley	294	0.35	+0.35
ACT Equality Party	John Simsons	274	0.32	+0.32
ACT Equality Party	Nancy-Louise McCullough	91	0.11	+0.11
Independent	Kurt Kennedy	168	0.20	+0.20
Independent	Tony Farrell	149	0.18	+0.18
Non-Party	John Farrell	76	0.09	+0.09
Non-Party	Robert Fearn	30	0.04	+0.04
Independent	Luke Garner	84	0.10	+0.10
Total formal votes		85,017	97.46	+1.09
Informal votes		2,218	2.54	−1.09
Turnout		87,235	91.30	+2.08
Party total votes
Labor		38,516	45.30	+5.99
Liberal		27,684	32.56	−1.57
Greens		9,776	11.50	−1.07
Helen Cross Independents		2,608	3.07	+3.07
Independent	Ken Helm	2,202	2.59	+2.59
Liberal Democrats		1,501	1.77	+1.77
Democrats		1,128	1.44	−6.19
Free Range Canberra		630	0.74	+0.74
ACT Equality Party		365	0.43	+0.43
Independent	Kurt Kennedy	168	0.20	+0.20
Independent	Tony Farrell	149	0.18	+0.18
Non-Party		106	0.12	+0.12
Independent	Luke Garner	84	0.10	+0.10
Labor hold		Swing	+7.21	
Labor hold		Swing	+2.54	
Labor hold		Swing	−0.64	
Liberal hold		Swing	+7.74	
Liberal hold		Swing	+3.61	
Liberal hold		Swing	+6.07	
Greens hold		Swing	+3.79	

==== 2001 ====
2001 Australian Capital Territory election: Molonglo
Party	Candidate	Votes	%	±%
Quota		9,817		
Labor	Simon Corbell (elected 3)	8,322	10.60	+5.95
Labor	Ted Quinlan (elected 4)	7,331	9.34	+5.38
Labor	Katy Gallagher (elected 5)	3,443	4.38	+4.38
Labor	John O'Keefe	3,305	4.21	+0.82
Labor	Christina Ryan	3,202	4.08	+4.08
Labor	Marion Reilly	2,942	3.75	−0.18
Labor	Fred Leftwich	2,328	2.96	+2.96
Liberal	Gary Humphries (elected 1)	15,856	20.19	+17.67
Liberal	Manuel Xyrakis	2,411	3.07	+3.07
Liberal	Helen Cross (elected 6)	2,352	3.00	+3.00
Liberal	Jacqui Burke	1,764	2.25	+1.29
Liberal	Greg Cornwell (elected 7)	1,616	2.06	+0.41
Liberal	Amalia Matheson	1,506	1.92	+1.92
Liberal	Mark Spill	1,298	1.65	+1.65
Greens	Kerrie Tucker (elected 2)	7,906	10.07	+3.92
Greens	Victoria Young	716	0.91	+0.91
Greens	Deb Foskey	658	0.84	+0.84
Greens	Michael Nolan	589	0.75	+0.75
Democrats	Jane Errey	2,230	2.84	+0.94
Democrats	Stella Jones	1,437	1.83	+1.83
Democrats	Isabel Walters	1,352	1.72	+1.72
Democrats	Eric Bray	973	1.24	+1.24
Nurses		765	0.97	+0.97
Nurses	Phillip Hickox	344	0.44	+0.44
Group I	Hilary Back	813	1.04	−0.71
Group I	Melanie Marshall	119	0.15	+0.15
Gungahlin Equality Party	Ian Ruecroft	382	0.49	+0.49
Gungahlin Equality Party	Jonathon Reynolds	362	0.46	+0.46
Canberra First Party	Lucinda Spier	314	0.40	+0.40
Canberra First Party	Nancy Louise McCullough	146	0.19	+0.19
Canberra First Party	Joel Pasternak	105	0.13	+0.13
Canberra First Party	Claire James	104	0.13	+0.13
Liberal Democrats	Duncan Spender	212	0.27	+0.27
Liberal Democrats	Brett Graham	169	0.22	+0.22
Liberal Democrats	John Purnell-Webb	150	0.19	+0.19
Independent	Ian Black	424	0.54	+0.54
Group G	Pamela Ayson	193	0.25	+0.25
Group G	Tania Gelonesi	91	0.12	+0.12
Kaine Independent Group	Alan Parker	129	0.16	+0.16
Kaine Independent Group	Colin Cartwright	115	0.15	+0.15
Independent	Marnie Black	54	0.07	+0.07
Total formal votes		78,528	96.37	+0.44
Informal votes		2,955	3.63	−0.44
Turnout		81,483	89.22	−1.20
Party total votes
Labor		30,873	39.31	+13.67
Liberal		26,803	34.13	−7.33
Greens		9,869	12.57	+2.46
Democrats		5,992	7.63	+2.56
Nurses	Robyn Staniforth	1,109	1.41	+1.41
Group I		932	1.19	+1.19
Gungahlin Equality Party		744	0.95	+0.95
Canberra First Party		669	0.85	+0.85
Liberal Democrats		531	0.68	+0.68
Independent	Ian Black	424	0.54	+0.54
Group G		284	0.36	+0.36
Kaine Independent Group		244	0.31	+0.31
Independent	Marnie Black	54	0.07	+0.07
Labor hold		Swing	+5.95	
Labor hold		Swing	+5.38	
Labor gain from Independent		Swing	+4.38	
Liberal hold		Swing	+17.67	
Liberal hold		Swing	+3.00	
Liberal hold		Swing	+0.41	
Greens hold		Swing	+3.92	

=== Elections in the 1990s ===
==== 1998 ====
1998 Australian Capital Territory election: Molonglo
Party	Candidate	Votes	%	±%
Quota		9,459		
Liberal	Kate Carnell (elected 1)	25,379	33.54	+4.79
Liberal	Gary Humphries (elected 2)	1,903	2.52	−2.04
Liberal	Greg Cornwell (elected 4)	1,248	1.65	−0.97
Liberal	Nick Tolley	851	1.12	+1.12
Liberal	Jacqui Burke	728	0.96	+0.96
Liberal	John Louttit	679	0.90	+0.90
Liberal	Greg Aouad	582	0.77	−0.76
Labor	Simon Corbell (elected 5)	3,515	4.65	+3.96
Labor	Ted Quinlan (elected 6)	3,000	3.96	+3.96
Labor	Marion Reilly	2,974	3.93	+3.03
Labor	Tania McMurtry	2,728	3.61	+3.61
Labor	Steve Garth	2,660	3.52	+3.52
Labor	John O'Keefe	2,565	3.39	+3.39
Labor	Chris Flaherty	1,962	2.59	+2.59
Greens	Kerrie Tucker (elected 3)	4,652	6.15	−0.16
Greens	Roland Manderson	720	0.95	+0.95
Greens	Caroline Le Couteur	566	0.75	+0.75
Greens	Niki Ruker	486	0.64	+0.64
Greens	Tiffany Lynch	483	0.64	+0.64
Greens	Miko Kirschbaum	373	0.49	+0.49
Greens	Michael Smitheram	370	0.49	+0.49
Moore Independents	Michael Moore (elected 7)	4,936	6.52	−0.53
Moore Independents	Joan Kellett	325	0.43	+0.43
Democrats	Jane Errey	1,437	1.90	+1.90
Democrats	Melissa McEwen	730	0.96	+1.90
Democrats	Jim Coates	385	0.51	+0.51
Democrats	John Davey	363	0.48	+0.48
Democrats	John Kennedy	309	0.41	+0.41
Democrats	Jason Wood	308	0.41	+0.41
Democrats	Jonathan Tonge	304	0.40	+0.40
Osborne Independent Group	Chris Uhlmann	1,644	2.17	+2.17
Osborne Independent Group	Chris Carlile	1,122	1.48	+1.48
Group F	Jacqui Rees	1,458	1.93	+1.93
Group F	Noel Haberecht	173	0.23	+0.23
Christian Democrats	Terry Craig	597	0.79	+0.79
Christian Democrats	John Edward Miller	597	0.79	+0.79
Democratic Socialist	Sue Bull	519	0.69	+0.69
Democratic Socialist	Tim Gooden	126	0.17	+0.17
Democratic Socialist	Nicholas Adam Soudakoff	100	0.13	+0.13
Independent	Jeremy Leyland	487	0.64	+0.64
Independent	Pamela Ayson	351	0.46	+0.46
Independent	Jerzy Gray-Grzeszkiewicz	320	0.42	+0.42
Progressive Labour	Robin Bartrum	103	0.14	+0.14
Progressive Labour	Bora Kanra	94	0.12	+0.12
Independent	John Hancock	166	0.22	+0.22
Independent	Nick Dyer	139	0.18	+0.18
Independent	Peter Willmott	60	0.08	+0.08
Independent	Roger John Nicholls	47	0.06	+0.06
Independent	Daryl Arthur Black	42	0.06	+0.06
Total formal votes		75,666	95.93	+1.82
Informal votes		3,213	4.07	−1.82
Turnout		78,879	90.42	+2.91
Party total votes
Liberal		31,370	41.46	−1.39
Labor		19,404	25.64	−5.16
Greens		7,650	10.11	−0.01
Moore Independents		5,261	6.95	−1.80
Democrats		3,836	5.07	+1.87
Osborne Independent Group		2,766	3.66	+3.66
Group F		1,631	2.16	+2.16
Christian Democrats		1,194	1.58	+1.58
Democratic Socialist		745	0.98	+0.98
Independent	Jeremy Leyland	487	0.64	+0.64
Independent	Pamela Ayson	351	0.46	+0.46
Independent	Jerzy Gray-Grzeszkiewicz	320	0.42	+0.42
Progressive Labour	Robin Bartrum	197	0.26	+0.26
Independent	John Hancock	166	0.22	+0.22
Independent	Nick Dyer	139	0.18	+0.18
Independent	Peter Willmott	60	0.08	+0.08
Independent	Roger John Nicholls	47	0.06	+0.06
Independent	Daryl Arthur Black	42	0.06	+0.06
Liberal hold		Swing	+4.79	
Liberal hold		Swing	−2.04	
Liberal hold		Swing	−0.97	
Labor hold		Swing	+3.96	
Labor hold		Swing	+3.96	
Greens hold		Swing	−0.16	
Moore Independents hold		Swing	−0.53	

==== 1995 ====
1995 Australian Capital Territory election: Molonglo
Party	Candidate	Votes	%	±%
Quota		8,430		
Liberal	Kate Carnell (elected 1)	19,386	28.75	NA
Liberal	Gary Humphries (elected 4)	3,074	4.56	NA
Liberal	Greg Cornwell (elected 6)	1,769	2.62	NA
Liberal	Lucinda Spier	1,432	2.12	NA
Liberal	Gwen Wilcox	1,293	1.92	NA
Liberal	Greg Aouad	1,033	1.53	NA
Liberal	David Ash	907	1.35	NA
Labor	Rosemary Follett (elected 2)	14,460	21.44	NA
Labor	Terry Connolly (elected 3)	3,017	4.47	NA
Labor	David Lamont	1,251	1.86	NA
Labor	Marion Reilly	609	0.90	NA
Labor	Michael Wilson	592	0.88	NA
Labor	Simon Corbell	462	0.69	NA
Labor	Silvia Zamora	434	0.64	NA
Greens	Kerrie Tucker (elected 5)	4,255	6.31	NA
Greens	Natasha Davis	1,470	2.18	NA
Greens	Shane Rattenbury	1,101	1.63	NA
Moore Independents	Michael Moore (elected 7)	4,753	7.05	NA
Moore Independents	Tona Ven Raay	595	0.88	NA
Moore Independents	Mark Dunstone	553	0.82	NA
Democrats	Nicola Appleyard	1,192	1.77	NA
Democrats	Greg Kramer	967	1.43	NA
Smokers Are Voters And Civil Rights	John McMahon	744	1.10	NA
Smokers Are Voters And Civil Rights	John Reavell	663	0.98	NA
Group F	Arthur Burns	265	0.39	NA
Group F	Terry De Luca	208	0.31	NA
Independent	Regina Slazenger	319	0.47	NA
Group H	Allison Dellit	183	0.27	NA
Group H	Alex Middleton	64	0.09	NA
Independent	Mike Boland	234	0.35	NA
Independent	Fred Weston	149	0.22	NA
Total formal votes		67,434	94.11	NA
Informal votes		4,222	5.89	NA
Turnout		71,656	87.51	NA
Party total votes
Liberal		28,894	42.85	NA
Labor		20,825	30.88	NA
Greens		6,826	10.12	NA
Moore Independents		5,901	8.75	NA
Democrats		2,159	3.20	NA
Smokers Are Voters And Civil Rights		1,407	2.09	NA
Group F		473	0.70	NA
Independent	Regina Slazenger	319	0.47	NA
Group H		247	0.37	NA
Independent	Mike Boland	234	0.35	NA
Independent	Fred Weston	149	0.22	NA
Liberal win		(new seat)		
Liberal win		(new seat)		
Liberal win		(new seat)		
Labor win		(new seat)		
Labor win		(new seat)		
Greens win		(new seat)		
Moore Independents win		(new seat)		
