= Members of the Australian Capital Territory Legislative Assembly, 2004–2008 =

Members of the Australian Capital Territory Legislative Assembly, 2004–2008

This is a list of members of the Australian Capital Territory Legislative Assembly, as elected at 16 October 2004 election.

Name	Party	Electorate	Term in office
Andrew Barr ^{[1]}	ALP	Molonglo	2006–present
Wayne Berry	ALP	Ginninderra	1989–2008
Jacqui Burke	Liberal	Molonglo	2001, 2002–2008
Simon Corbell	ALP	Molonglo	1996–2016
Vicki Dunne	Liberal	Ginninderra	2001–2020
Dr Deb Foskey	Greens	Molonglo	2004–2008
Katy Gallagher	ALP	Molonglo	2001–2014
Mick Gentleman	ALP	Brindabella	2004–2008, 2012–2024
John Hargreaves	ALP	Brindabella	1998–2012
Karin MacDonald	ALP	Brindabella	2001–2008
Richard Mulcahy	Liberal/Independent/ RMCP ^{[2]}	Molonglo	2004–2008
Mary Porter	ALP	Ginninderra	2004–2016
Steve Pratt	Liberal	Brindabella	2001–2008
Ted Quinlan ^{[1]}	ALP	Molonglo	1998–2006
Zed Seselja	Liberal	Molonglo	2001–2013
Brendan Smyth	Liberal	Brindabella	1998–2016
Jon Stanhope	ALP	Ginninderra	1998–2011
Bill Stefaniak	Liberal	Ginninderra	1989–1992, 1994–2008

^{1} Molonglo Labor MLA Ted Quinlan resigned on 21 March 2006. Andrew Barr was elected as his replacement on a countback on 3 April
^{2} Molonglo MLA Richard Mulcahy was expelled from the Liberal Party on 10 December 2007. Mulcahy served as an independent until August 2008, when he formed the Richard Mulcahy Canberra Party to contest the 2008 election.

== See also ==
- 2004 Australian Capital Territory election
