= Members of the Australian Capital Territory Legislative Assembly, 2008–2012 =

Members of the Australian Capital Territory Legislative Assembly, 2008–2012

This is a list of members of the seventh Australian Capital Territory Legislative Assembly, as elected at and subsequent to 18 October 2008 election.

Name	Party	Electorate	Term in office
Andrew Barr	ALP	Molonglo	2006–present
Amanda Bresnan	Green	Brindabella	2008–2012
Joy Burch	ALP	Brindabella	2008–2024
Chris Bourke^{[1]}	ALP	Ginninderra	2011–2016
Alistair Coe	Liberal	Ginninderra	2008–2021
Simon Corbell	ALP	Molonglo	1996–2016
Steve Doszpot	Liberal	Brindabella	2008–2017
Vicki Dunne	Liberal	Ginninderra	2001–2020
Katy Gallagher	ALP	Molonglo	2001–2014
Jeremy Hanson	Liberal	Molonglo	2008–present
John Hargreaves	ALP	Brindabella	1998–2012
Meredith Hunter	Green	Ginninderra	2008–2012
Caroline Le Couteur	Green	Molonglo	2008–2012, 2016–2020
Mary Porter	ALP	Ginninderra	2004–2016
Shane Rattenbury	Green	Molonglo	2008–present
Zed Seselja	Liberal	Molonglo	2004–2013
Brendan Smyth	Liberal	Brindabella	1998–2016
Jon Stanhope^{[1]}	ALP	Ginninderra	1998–2011

== See also ==
- 2008 Australian Capital Territory election

== Notes ==
^{1} On 16 May 2011, Labor member for Ginninderra and former Chief Minister, Jon Stanhope, resigned. Chris Bourke was elected by countback on 1 June 2011 to fill the casual vacancy.
