= Candice Burch =

Australian politician (born 1988)

Member of the Australian Capital Territory Legislative Assembly for Kurrajong
- In office 13 December 2017 – 17 October 2020
- Preceded by: Steve Doszpot

Personal details
- Born: 26 August 1988 (age 38) South Africa
- Party: Liberal Party
- Education: Australian National University
- Occupation: Politician

Candice Burch (born 26 August 1988) is an Australian politician who was a Liberal member of the Australian Capital Territory Legislative Assembly. Candice Burch is not to be confused with nor is biologically related to Joy Burch, who is another member of the ACT Legislative Assembly. Candice Burch was one of three Canberra Liberals who lost their seat in the 2020 ACT Election. Since losing her seat in the Assembly, Candice now works as Public Affairs and Communications Manager for the Pharmaceutical Society of Australia.

== Early career ==
Burch was born in South Africa, and emigrated to Australia at a young age in 1990. She graduated from the Australian National University with a Bachelor of Arts and Bachelor of Economics. She was previously employed in the Australian Public Service, most recently as an assistant director in the Department of Finance.

Burch has stated that she has had a keen interest in local politics since she was a young person. After moving to Canberra in 2007, Burch became the ANU Liberal Club President in 2010 and the ACT Young Liberal President in 2014. Burch noticed extraordinary levels of Government debt and believed it was important to put up her hand and to have a young person involved in the decisions of how public money is spent.

== Election and Work in the ACT Legislative Assembly ==
Burch was elected in a count-back held on 11 December 2017 to fill the casual vacancy for the Kurrajong electorate caused by the death of Steve Doszpot, and was declared elected on 13 December. Burch stated that it was not easy to take the seat in such difficult circumstances. However, her 'deep-rooted passion' for freedom, equal opportunity and small government led her to take-up the challenge. In her inaugural speech, Burch noted that her sudden election was reflective of the 'unexpected nature of life and Hare-Clark’. Burch stated that being a member of the ACT Legislative Assembly involves a lot of hard work and a genuine desire to represent one's constituents.

Burch's election marked the first female-majority Liberal opposition in Australia. Another motivating factor for Burch was to assist in removing barriers to gender equality. She noted in her inaugural speech that being a Liberal and being a woman are not incompatible identities.

Burch became the Liberals' Shadow Minister for Transport & Public Sector Management and was a fierce opponent of the Canberra Light Rail. In the portfolio Burch was responsible for policy in relation to transport and road safety. In her role, Burch fought against what she saw as poorly managed and directed bus routes, which in tandem with the light rail caused great transport issues in the ACT. Burch has noted that her proudest achievement was her campaign mounted against the ACT Government's cuts for school buses and the reversal of a number of those cuts.

== 2020 ACT Election ==
The 2020 ACT Election saw seat loses for both Labor and the Liberals. Alongside James Milligan and Andrew Wall, Burch was one of three Liberals to lose their seat. Burch was battling for the fifth Kurrajong seat of which she narrowly lost to the ACT Greens' Rebecca Vassarotti.

During the 2020 ACT Election, an internal ACT Liberal Party investigation revolved around the illegal destruction of Burch's campaign material by former ACT Young Liberal President, Ben Dennehy. Throughout the campaign, hundreds of Candice Burch corflutes (i.e. political signage) were systematically destroyed under the cover of darkness. The investigation allegedly found video evidence of Ben Dennehy vandalising Burch's campaign material. The investigation culminated in Ben Dennehy's resignation from the party in early 2021 alongside a second ACT Young Liberal who was not named. Almost a year on at the 2021 Canberra Liberals Annual General Meeting in December, party members continued to ask questions and called for the party president to give a public apology to Burch. At the meeting, one party member stated: "To this day there would be party members who would be unaware of the cruel campaign... that was waged against Candice by two of our own ... I implore the Division to apologise to Candice for failing to meet its duty of care."

== Personal life ==
Burch is a supporter of the Sydney Swans AFL team and the Canberra Brave Ice Hockey team. Additionally, she notes that she is an avid reader, stating after her electoral loss “I’m most excited about having time off and getting back to my reading list”. Burch is a distant cousin of Australian actress Liz Burch. Burch herself has appeared in television as herself on ABC's The House and Weekend Edition.
