= Brendan Smyth (politician) =

Australian politician

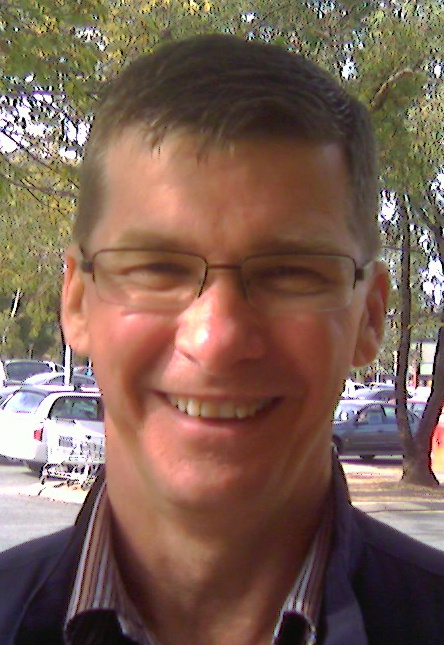

Member of the ACT Legislative Assembly
- In office 21 February 1998 – 15 July 2016 Serving with Wood/Burch, Hargreaves/Gentleman, Kaine/Pratt/Doszpot/Seselja/Lawder, Osborne/MacDonald/Bresnan/Wall
- Constituency: Brindabella

Member of the Australian Parliament for Canberra
- In office 25 March 1995 – 2 March 1996
- Preceded by: Ros Kelly
- Succeeded by: Bob McMullan

Personal details
- Born: Brendan Michael Smyth; 27 July 1959 (age 66) Sydney, Australia
- Party: Liberal Party
- Website: Profile at CanberraLiberals.org

Brendan Michael Smyth (born 27 July 1959) is an Australian former politician, who was a member of the Australian Capital Territory Legislative Assembly representing the electorate of Brindabella for the Liberal Party from 1998 until 2016. From 2002 to 2006 Smyth was the ACT Leader of the Opposition and served briefly as the Deputy Chief Minister during 2000 and 2001. He has held the ACT portfolios Urban Services, Business, Tourism and the Arts, and Police and Emergency Services.

Prior to his election to the ACT Legislative Assembly he served briefly as the Member for Canberra in the Australian House of Representatives, also representing the Liberals.

== Career ==
Smyth was born in Sydney and moved to Canberra in May 1969. He worked at the National Library of Australia until 1995 when, representing the Liberal Party, he contested the 1995 by-election for the House of Representatives seat of Canberra. Normally a safe Labor seat, its previous member Ros Kelly had left under a cloud, having been forced to resign her ministry a year earlier over the sports rorts affair, and Smyth received a 16.1% swing to claim the seat.

At the Australian federal election on 2 March 1996, Smyth contested the new federal House of Representatives seat of Namadgi, essentially the southern portion of his old seat, even though it had been drawn with a notional Labor majority of 10.9 percent. He was defeated by Labor's Annette Ellis. As of the election in May 2022, he is the last non-Labor member to represent an ACT-based seat.

He subsequently shifted to territory politics, winning election to the Legislative Assembly in the 1998 election representing the Tuggeranong-based multimember electorate of Brindabella. He was the Opposition Leader for the ACT Liberal Party in the 2004 ACT elections, but lost the election.

Smyth resigned from the ACT Legislative Assembly on 15 July 2016, to take up a newly created government position as Commissioner for International Engagement for the ACT. The ensuing casual vacancy was filled by conducting a countback of votes at the 2012 ACT election.

== See also ==
- Humphries Ministry

Political offices
Preceded by Gary Humphries	Opposition Leader of the Australian Capital Territory; 2002–2006	Succeeded by Bill Stefaniak
Preceded by Trevor Kaine	ACT Minister for Urban Services; 1998–2001	Succeeded by Bill Wood
Preceded by Kate Carnell	ACT Minister for Business, Tourism and the Arts; 2000–2001	Succeeded by Ted Quinlan as Minister for Economic Development, Business and Tourism
Preceded by Bill Stefaniak as Minister Assisting the Attorney-General	ACT Minister for Police and Emergency Services; 2000–2001	Succeeded by Ted Quinlan as Minister for Police, Emergency Services and Corrections
Preceded by Gary Humphries	Deputy Chief Minister; 2000–2001	Succeeded by Ted Quinlan
Parliament of Australia
Preceded by Ros Kelly	Member for Canberra; 1995–1996	Succeeded by Bob McMullan
Australian Capital Territory Legislative Assembly
Preceded by Louise Littlewood	Member of the Legislative Assembly for Brindabella; 1998–2016; Served alongside: Wood/Burch, Hargreaves/Gentleman, Kaine/Pratt/Doszpot/Seselja/Lawder, Osborne/MacDonald/Bresnan/Wall	Succeeded by Val Jeffery
Party political offices
Preceded by Gary Humphries	Leader of the Australian Capital Territory Liberals; 2002–2006	Succeeded by Bill Stefaniak
