= 2012 Australian Capital Territory election =

- 20 October 2012

All 17 seats of the Australian Capital Territory Legislative Assembly 9 seats needed for a majority
- Opinion polls
- Turnout: 89.3 (▼1.1 pp)
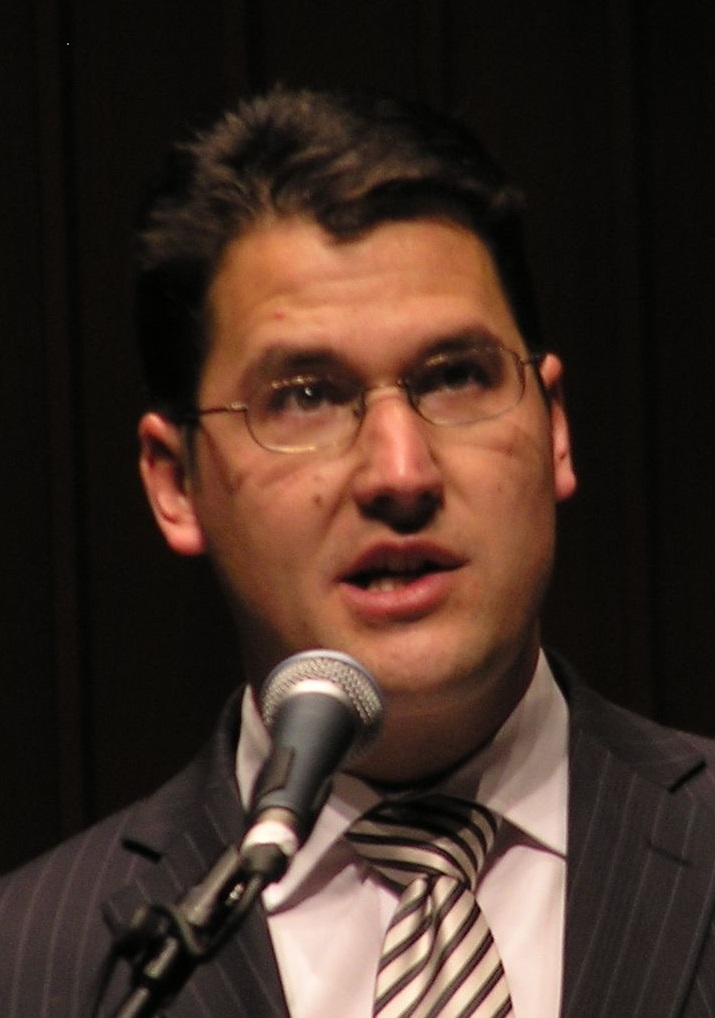

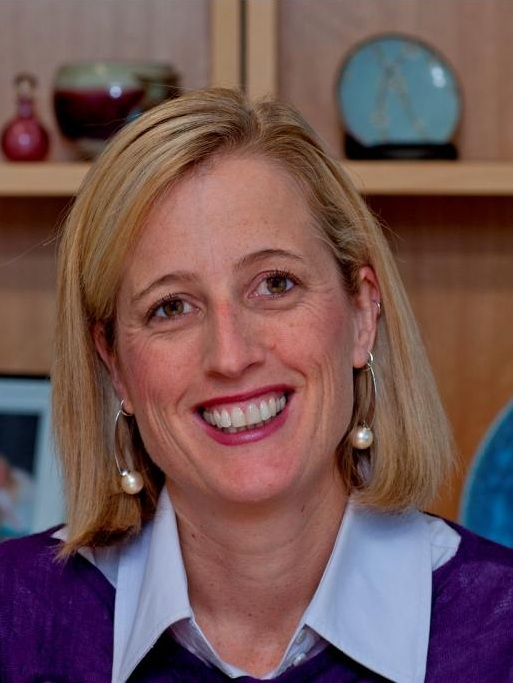

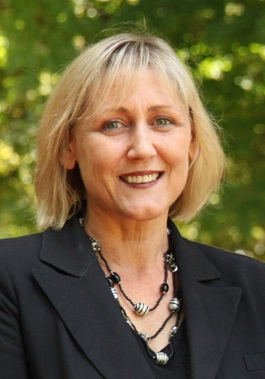
	First party	Second party	Third party
Leader	Zed Seselja	Katy Gallagher	Meredith Hunter
Party	Liberal	Labor	Greens
Leader since	13 December 2007	16 May 2011	October 2008
Leader's seat	Brindabella	Molonglo	Ginninderra (lost seat)
Last election	6 seats, 31.59%	7 seats, 37.39%	4 seats, 15.62%
Seats won	8	8	1
Seat change	▲2	▲1	▼3
Primary vote	86,032	85,991	23,773
Percentage	38.90%	38.88%	10.75%
Swing	▲7.31	▲1.49	▼4.87
- Results by electorate
Chief Minister before election
Katy Gallagher
Labor
Elected Chief Minister
Katy Gallagher
Labor-Greens Coalition

Elections to the Australian Capital Territory Legislative Assembly occurred on Saturday, 20 October 2012. The 11-year incumbent Labor Party, led by Chief Minister Katy Gallagher, won a fourth term over the main opposition Liberal Party, led by opposition leader Zed Seselja.

Candidates are elected to fill all 17 Legislative Assembly seats in the unicameral parliament which consists of three multi-member electorates, Brindabella (five seats), Ginninderra (five seats) and Molonglo (seven seats), using a proportional representation single transferable vote method known as the Hare-Clark system. The election was conducted by the ACT Electoral Commission.

== Key dates ==
- Last day to lodge applications for party register: 30 June 2012
- Party registration closed: 13 September 2012
- Pre-election period commenced and nominations opened: 14 September 2012
- Rolls closed: 21 September 2012
- Nominations closed: 26 September 2012
- Nominations declared and ballot paper order determined: 27 September 2012
- Pre-poll voting commenced: 2 October 2012
- Polling day, between the hours of 8 am and 6 pm: 20 October 2012

== Background ==
The incumbent Labor Party led by Chief Minister Katy Gallagher attempted to win re-election for a historic fourth term after 11 years in government in the 17-member unicameral ACT Legislative Assembly. Labor, led by Jon Stanhope, formed a minority government after the 2008 election, with Greens holding the balance of power – Labor 7 seats (37.4%), Liberal 6 seats (31.6%), Greens 4 seats (15.6%). Stanhope resigned as Chief Minister and Labor leader on 12 May 2011, and was replaced by his deputy, Katy Gallagher.

All members of the unicameral Assembly faced re-election, with members being elected by the Hare-Clark system of proportional representation. The Assembly is divided into three electorates: five-member Brindabella (including Tuggeranong and parts of the Woden Valley) and Ginninderra (including Belconnen and suburbs) and seven-member Molonglo (including North Canberra, South Canberra, Gungahlin, Weston Creek, and the remainder of the Woden Valley). Election dates are set in statute with four-year fixed terms.

== Candidates ==
Nine political parties were registered with the ACT Electoral Office as eligible for the October 2012 election.

- Australian Labor Party (ACT Branch)
- Australian Motorist Party
- Bullet Train for Canberra
- Liberal Democratic Party
- Marion Lê Social Justice Party
- Liberal Party of Australia (A.C.T. Division) (Canberra Liberals)
- Pangallo Independents Party
- The ACT Greens
- The Community Alliance Party (ACT)

Three further organisations—Pirate Party Australia, Australian Democrats and No Carbon Tax Climate Sceptics—were not registered as political parties in the ACT, however had stated they intended to nominate candidates to be listed on ballot papers as independents.

=== Retiring members ===
==== Labor ====
- John Hargreaves (Brindabella)

=== Brindabella ===
Five seats were up for election. The Labor Party was defending two seats. The Liberal Party was defending two seats. The Greens were defending one seat.

Labor candidates	Liberal candidates	Greens candidates	Bullet Train candidates	Motorist candidates	Ungrouped candidates
Joy Burch*; Bec Cody; Mick Gentleman*; Mike Kinniburgh; Karl Maftoum	Val Jeffery; Nicole Lawder; Zed Seselja*; Brendan Smyth*; Andrew Wall*	Amanda Bresnan; Johnathan Davis; Ben Murphy	Mark Erwood; Adam Henschke	Burl Doble; Kieran Jones-Ellis	Mark Gibbons (-); Michael Lindfield (Ind); Calvin Pearce (Ind)

=== Ginninderra ===
Five seats were up for election. The Labor Party was defending two seats. The Liberal Party was defending two seats. The Greens were defending one seat.

Labor candidates	Liberal candidates	Greens candidates	Motorist candidates	LDP candidates	MLSJ candidates	Bullet Train candidates	Ungrouped candidates
Yvette Berry*; Chris Bourke*; Jayson Hinder; Glen McCrea; Mary Porter*	Alistair Coe*; Vicki Dunne*; Merinda Nash; Jacob Vadakkedathu; Matt Watts	James Higgins; Meredith Hunter; Hannah Parris	Chic Henry; Darryl Walford	Mustafa Jawadi; Matt Thompson	Majlinda Bitani; Nehmat Nana Jbeili; Karamia Lê; Marion Lê; Kate Reynolds	Chris Bucknell; Tony Halton	Darren Churchill (-); Emmanuel Ezekiel-Hart (Ind); Norm Gingell (Ind); Glen Takkenberg (-)

=== Molonglo ===
Seven seats were up for election. The Labor Party was defending three seats. The Liberal Party was defending two seats. The Greens were defending two seats.

Elected in this election were 3 Labour (Barr, Corbell, Gallagher), 2 Liberals (Doszpot, Hanson), and two Greens (Le Coutour, Rattenbury)

Labor candidates	Liberal candidates	Greens candidates	LDP candidates	Motorist candidates	Bullet Train candidates	Ungrouped candidates
Andrew Barr*; Simon Corbell*; Angie Drake; Meegan Fitzharris; Katy Gallagher*; Mark Kulasingham; David Mathews	Steve Doszpot*; Murray Gordon; Jeremy Hanson*; Giulia Jones*; Elizabeth Lee; James Milligan; Tom Sefton	Alan Kerlin; Caroline Le Couteur; Shane Rattenbury*; Adriana Siddle	Ian Gardner; Trisha Jha	David Cumbers; Mark Curran	Tim Bohm; Shelley Dickerson	Stuart Biggs (-); Philip Pocock (Ind)

=== Unregistered parties and groups ===
- Pirate Party Australia endorsed Mark Gibbons in Brindabella, Glen Takkenberg in Ginninderra, and Stuart Biggs in Molonglo.

== Opinion polling ==
- On 18 October 2012, 1,200 voters (400 voters per seat, 5% MoE) were polled by Patterson Research Group and published in The Canberra Times. Labor was on 44.5 percent (+7.1 points), the Liberals were on 35.5 percent (+3.9 points), the Greens were on 14.5 (−1.0 point) while others were on 5.5 percent (−9.9 points). This would have produced a result somewhere from minority government to majority government for the incumbent Labor government. It was the only poll conducted during the election campaign.

== Results ==
=== Territory-wide vote ===
Party	Votes	%	+/–	Seats	+/–
Liberal	86,032	38.90	▲7.31	8	▲2
Labor	85,991	38.88	▲1.49	8	▲1
Greens	23,773	10.75	▼4.87	1	▼3
Motorists	9,179	4.15	▼0.84	0	0
Bullet Train	8,864	4.01	New	0	New
Independents	4,053	1.83	▼1.46	0	0
Liberal Democratic Party	2,340	1.06	▲0.69	0	0
Marion Lê Social Justice	940	0.43	New	0	New
Total	221,172	100.00	–	17	–
Valid votes	221,172	96.53			
Invalid/blank votes	7,953	3.47			
Total votes	229,125	100.00			
Registered voters/turnout	256,702	89.26			

=== Primary vote by electorate ===
Results by electorate
	Brindabella			Ginninderra			Molonglo		
Party	Votes	%	Seats	Votes	%	Seats	Votes	%	Seats
Liberal	29,496	46.4	3	22,275	33.7	2	34,261	37.4	3
Labor	22,665	35.7	2	26,354	39.9	3	36,972	40.4	3
Greens	5,032	7.9	0	6,676	10.1	0	12,065	13.2	1
Motorist Party	2,488	3.9	0	4,794	7.3	0	1,897	2.1	0
Bullet Train	2,395	3.8	0	2,358	3.6	0	4,111	4.5	0
Independent	1,486	2.3	0	1,466	2.2	0	1,101	1.2	0
Liberal Democrats	—	—	—	1,213	1.8	0	1,127	1.2	0
Marion Lê Social Justice	—	—	—	940	1.4	0	—	—	—

=== Final distribution of seats ===
Electorate	Seats held
Brindabella	
Ginninderra	
Molonglo	

Labor
Liberal
Green

== Formation of Government ==
After the distribution of preferences neither of the two major parties had won sufficient number of seats to form government in their own right and would need the support of the sole Greens representative Shane Rattenbury. While Labor leader Katy Gallagher wanted to renew the cooperation with the Greens from the previous election period, Liberal leader Zed Seselja argued that in the light of the overall losses of the previous Labor-Green alliance, the strong Liberal gain of 7.3%, and a historic tie in both seats and percentage (38.9% for each major party), with his party having received 41 more preference votes than Labor, the Liberals as the formally strongest party should lead the new Government.

After a week of negotiations with both major parties, Shane Rattenburry came to a formal agreement with the Labor Party to form a Coalition Government, which meant that he would be appointed to the cabinet, and implement nearly 100 policies and reforms mainly regarding the rail network in Canberra, the clean up of Canberra's lakes, the ACT's climate change targets, the Gonski education reforms and the reduction of homelessness. Despite "constructive conversations" with the Liberals Rattenbury justified the decision with the greater closeness between the two parties' policies, which would allow a "stable government", Gallagher's "more substantial agenda" and the Liberals' perceived irresponsibility towards progressive tax reforms. Another reason discussed by the press was that Seselja did not want to give a minister post to Rattenbury. As a result of Rattenbury's promotion to the cabinet, Gallagher planned to enlarge the cabinet to six ministers.

On 6 November 2012, Gallagher was re-elected as chief minister with the votes of her Labor-Green coalition. Labor's candidate for the office of Speaker Mary Porter, as expected, was not successful, as Rattenbury had announced at the same time as the government agreement that he would vote for the Liberal Party's candidate, which in the end was Vicki Dunne. Porter was elected Deputy Speaker instead. While both Chief Minister Katy Gallagher and Opposition Leader Zed Seselja retained their positions following the outcome of this election, neither lasted in their positions to lead their respective parties at the next election in 2016 as both remarkably resigned from their positions of their own volitions and from the territory Parliament to move to the Federal Parliament as the two senators representing the ACT.

== Newspaper endorsements ==
Newspaper	Endorsement
The Canberra Times	Labor

== See also ==
- 2008 Australian Capital Territory election
- 2016 Australian Capital Territory election
- Members of the Australian Capital Territory Legislative Assembly, 2008–2012
- Members of the Australian Capital Territory Legislative Assembly, 2012–2016
