= Chic Henry =

Australian car enthusiast (1946–2022)

- Born: Anthony Robert Henry; 15 December 1946; Launceston, Tasmania
- Died: 14 April 2022 (aged 75); Canberra, Australia
- Spouse: Doreen (1968–1984)
- Children: Angela Michelle
- Parent(s): Robert Henry and Alma Horton

Chic Henry, born Anthony Robert Henry (15 December 1946 – 14 April 2022), was a car enthusiast and the founder of the Summernats motor festival in Canberra. He was the Summernats director between 1988 and 2009.

== Life and career ==
On 15 December 1946, Henry was born in Launceston, Tasmania to returned serviceman father Robert Henry and mother Alma Horton. Henry's great, great grandfather had been Tasmania's first Postmaster; his great grandfather had worked on the project to lay underwater phone cable between Tasmania and mainland Australia; and his grandfather and father had both served with the Postmaster-General's Department.

Henry attended Queechy High School in Norwood, Tasmania, repeating his last year. At school he was a strong competitive swimmer and board diver.

Accepting an apprenticeship with the Australian Army, Henry moved to Melbourne in 1964. His army career saw him living in Sydney and Townsville before his resignation in 1973.

In the 1980s, Henry was involved with the Australian Street Machine Federation. In 1987, Henry built a dedicated burnout track at Exhibition Park in Canberra (EPIC, then known as Natex), and he held the first Summernats at the venue in January 1988. Thousands of attendees turned up at the event, which featured cars and entertainment from rock and bush bands, including hundreds for the first Summernats Street parade down Northbourne Avenue on 2 January. Henry told media that promotion costs amounted to around $500,000.

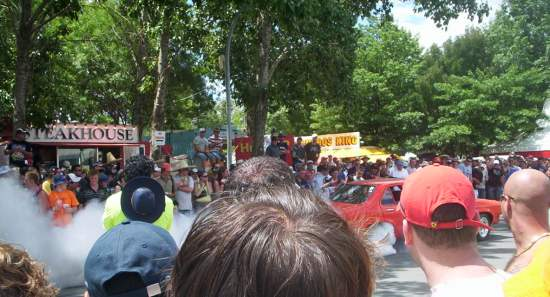
Burnout at Summernats 2005

Summernats went on to become one of Canberra's premier tourism events.

In January 2009, Henry was cautioned after he drove 77 kilometres an hour in a special 40 kilometre zone outside the Summernats venue. Henry explained to police that he had not seen the new sign and avoided a fine. After the 2009 event drew fewer attendees than expected, Henry entered negotiations with a possible buyer for the business. He confirmed the sale of the business to an undisclosed buyer in July 2009.

Henry ran for a seat at the 2012 ACT election, contesting in the northern suburbs electorate of Ginninderra for the Australian Motorist Party. Ahead of the election, Henry told voters to give their second preferences to the Canberra Liberals.

At the end of 2013, Henry left the Australian Motorist Party and joined the ACT Liberal Party.
