= Andrew Wall =

Australian politician

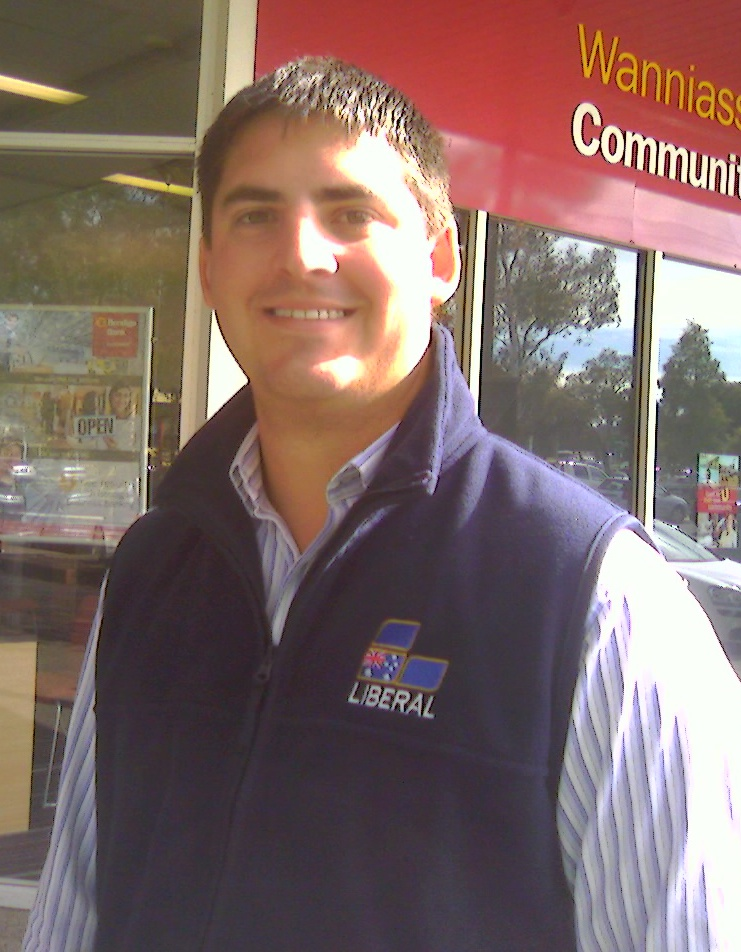
- Andrew Wall at Wanniassa Shops

Member of the Australian Capital Territory Legislative Assembly for Brindabella
- In office 20 October 2012 – 17 October 2020 Serving with Burch, Gentleman, Seselja/Lawder, Smyth/Jeffery

Personal details
- Born: 23 June 1984 (age 41) Canberra, ACT
- Party: Liberal Party
- Spouse: Christine Wall
- Occupation: Construction management
- Website: ACT Legislative Assembly profile

Andrew Wall (born 23 June 1984) is an Australian former politician. He was a member of the Australian Capital Territory Legislative Assembly representing the electorate of Brindabella for the Liberal Party from 2012 until 2020.

== Career ==
Wall was born in Canberra, raised in Wanniassa, and attended Marist College. He spent several years in Queanbeyan before returning to Canberra.

Prior to his election, Wall worked in the construction industry, managing a patio business.

== See also ==
Australian Capital Territory Legislative Assembly
Preceded by Amanda Bresnan	Member of the Legislative Assembly for Brindabella; 2012–2020; Served alongside: Burch, Gentleman, Seselja/Lawder, Smyth/Jeffery	Succeeded by Johnathan Davis
