= Louise Littlewood =

Australian politician

Louise Littlewood is an Australian politician and was a member of the Australian Capital Territory Legislative Assembly representing the multi-member electorate of Brindabella for the Liberal Party. Littlewood was elected following a recount of ballot papers to fill a casual vacancy resulting from the resignation of Tony De Domenico in the third ACT Legislative Assembly. Littlewood was sworn into the Assembly on 18 February 1997. Littlewood contested the 1998 ACT general election; however, she was unsuccessful in retaining her seat.
