= Val Jeffery =

Australian politician (1934–2017)

Val Jeffery AFSM, OAM

Member of the Australian Capital Territory Legislative Assembly for Brindabella
- In office 28 July 2016 – 11 August 2016 Serving with Burch, Gentleman, Lawder, Wall

Personal details
- Born: Valentine Max Jeffery; 6 December 1934 Queanbeyan, New South Wales
- Died: 18 July 2017 (aged 82) Queanbeyan, New South Wales
- Party: Liberal Party (after 2008)
- Other political affiliations: The Community Alliance Party (2008)

Valentine Max Jeffery AFSM OAM (6 December 1934 – 18 July 2017) was an Australian politician.

Jeffery was elected to the Australian Capital Territory Legislative Assembly as a Liberal member for Brindabella on 28 July 2016, following a countback resulting from Brendan Smyth's resignation. He was the owner of the Tharwa general store and had run as a Liberal candidate in the 2012 ACT election (and previously in the 2008 election for The Community Alliance Party). At the age of 81, he is the oldest person to have sat in the Assembly, and did not re-contest his seat at the 2016 election held in October, with his term lasting just over two weeks and six assembly sittings. He died on 18 July 2017 at the age of 82.
