= 2008 Australian Capital Territory election =

- 18 October 2008

All 17 seats of the Australian Capital Territory Legislative Assembly 9 seats needed for a majority
- Opinion polls
- Turnout: 90.4 (▼2.4 pp)
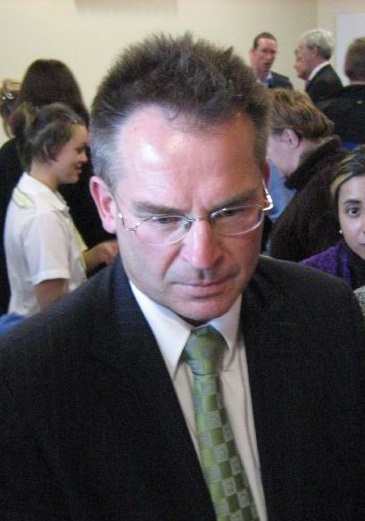

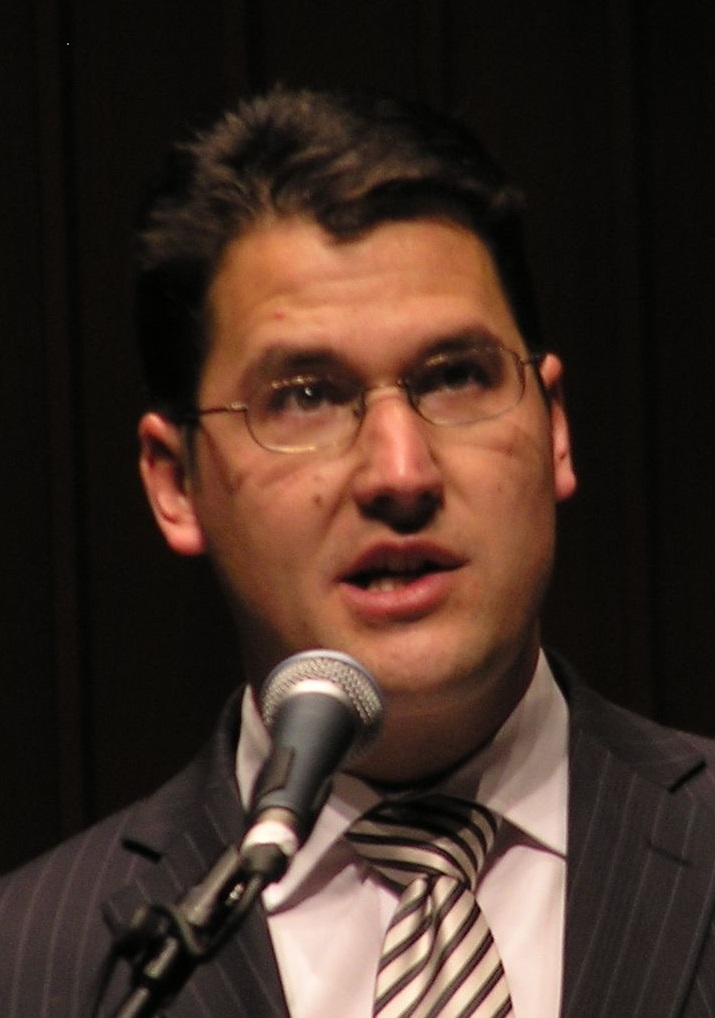

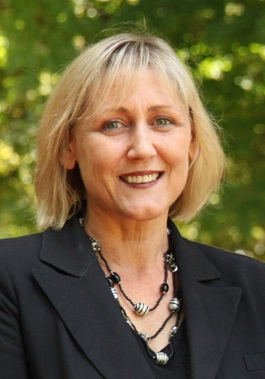
	First party	Second party	Third party
Leader	Jon Stanhope	Zed Seselja	Meredith Hunter
Party	Labor	Liberal	Greens
Leader since	19 March 1998	13 December 2007	October 2008
Leader's seat	Ginninderra	Molonglo	Ginninderra
Last election	9 seats	7 seats	1 seat
Seats won	7	6	4
Seat change	▼2	▼1	▲3
Primary vote	79,126	66,855	33,057
Percentage	37.4%	31.6%	15.6%
Swing	▼9.4	▼3.2	▲6.3
- Results by electorate
Chief Minister before election
Jon Stanhope
Labor
Resulting Chief Minister
Jon Stanhope
Labor

Elections to the Australian Capital Territory Legislative Assembly were held on Saturday, 18 October 2008. The incumbent Labor Party, led by Jon Stanhope, was challenged by the Liberal Party, led by Zed Seselja. Candidates were elected to fill three multi-member electorates using a single transferable vote method, known as the Hare-Clark system.

The result was another hung parliament with Labor winning seven seats, the Liberals six seats and the Greens finishing with four seats, giving the Greens the balance of power in the 17-member unicameral Assembly. On 31 October 2008, after almost two weeks of deliberations, the Greens chose to support a Labor minority government. Consequently, Labor was re-elected to a third consecutive term of government in the ACT. Stanhope was elected Chief Minister at the first sitting of the seventh Assembly on 5 November 2008. The election was conducted by the ACT Electoral Commission.

== Key dates ==
- Last day to lodge applications for party register: 30 June 2008
- Party registration closed: 11 September 2008
- Pre-election period commenced and nominations opened: 12 September 2008
- Rolls closed: 19 September 2008
- Nominations closed: 24 September 2008
- Nominations declared and ballot paper order determined: 25 September 2008
- Pre-poll voting commenced: 29 September 2008
- Polling day: 18 October 2008
- Scrutiny completed: 25 October 2008
- Poll declared: 29 October 2008
- Legislative Assembly formed: 5 November 2008

== Overview ==
The incumbent centre-left Labor Party, led by Chief Minister Jon Stanhope, attempted to win re-election for a third term after coming to power in 2001. They were challenged by the opposition centre-right Liberal Party, led by Zed Seselja, who assumed the Liberal leadership in December 2007. A third party, the ACT Greens, held one seat in the Assembly through retiring MLA Deb Foskey.

The election saw all 17 members of the Assembly face re-election, with members being elected by the Hare-Clark system of proportional representation. The Assembly is divided into three electorates: five-member Brindabella (including Tuggeranong and parts of the Woden Valley) and Ginninderra (including Belconnen and suburbs) and seven-member Molonglo (including North Canberra, South Canberra, Gungahlin, Weston Creek, and the remainder of the Woden Valley). Election dates are set in statute to occur once every four years; the government has no ability to set the election date.

Following the 2004 election outcome, Labor held 9 seats, becoming the first majority government in the territory's history. The opposition Liberal Party held 7 seats, with the Greens holding a further one. The Liberal numbers in the Assembly dropped to six in December 2007 when former Shadow Treasurer Richard Mulcahy was expelled from the party and began sitting as an independent. The opposition thus would have needed to win a further three seats, on top of regaining Mulcahy's seat, to hold government in its own right.

The Liberal campaign suffered early problems in February 2008 when a number of prominent Liberal Party and business figures, including popular former Chief Minister Kate Carnell and high-profile businessman and former party finance director Jim Murphy, relaunched the 250 Club, previously a Liberal fundraising group, as the independent Canberra Business Club. The new organisation pledged to support minor party and independent pro-business candidates in the election, citing their disillusion with both major parties and the need for a third political force in the Assembly. At the same time, their best prospect for winning Mulcahy's seat of Molonglo, the Liberal candidate for Fraser in the previous Federal election, Troy Williams, withdrew.

=== Polling ===
Conducted by Patterson Market Research, and published in The Canberra Times, polling released on 4 October suggested the Green vote had doubled to tripled since the last election, at the expense of Labor, with the Liberal vote relatively unchanged. Commentators predicted the Greens would hold the balance of power and decide who forms government. The Greens stated they were willing to court both major parties.

=== Scanning of ballot papers ===
In the 2001 and 2004 elections, after the first manual count of paper ballots the preferences were data entered for distribution. For the 2008 election, paper ballots were scanned and character recognition software used to identify preferences. Any preferences that could not be identified by the software were entered manually.

== Candidates ==
Sitting members at the time of the election are listed in bold. Tickets that elected at least one MLA are highlighted in the relevant colour. Successful candidates are indicated by an asterisk (*).

=== Retiring members ===
==== Labor ====
- Wayne Berry (Ginninderra)
- Karin MacDonald (Brindabella)

==== Liberal ====
- Bill Stefaniak (Ginninderra)

==== Greens ====
- Deb Foskey (Molonglo)

=== Brindabella ===
Five seats were up for election. The Labor Party was defending three seats. The Liberal Party was defending two seats.

Labor candidates	Liberal candidates	Greens candidates	Motorist candidates	CAP candidates
Joy Burch*; **Mick Gentleman**; **John Hargreaves***; Tracey Macket; Wayne Sievers	Steve Doszpot*; David Morgan; **Steve Pratt**; Audrey Ray; **Brendan Smyth***	Amanda Bresnan*; Sue Ellerman	Ben Doble; Burl Doble; Brian McLachlan; Geoff Rake; Bruce Ritchie	Val Jeffery; James Sizer

=== Ginninderra ===
Five seats were up for election. The Labor Party was defending three seats. The Liberal Party was defending two seats.

Labor candidates	Liberal candidates	Greens candidates	Motorist candidates	CAP candidates	Ungrouped candidates
Chris Bourke; Adina Cirson; **Mary Porter***; Dave Peebles; **Jon Stanhope***	Alistair Coe*; **Vicki Dunne***; Jacqui Myers; Andrea Tokaji; Matthew Watts	James Higgins; Meredith Hunter*	Deborah Hannigan; Chris Seddon; Andrew Simmington; Denis Walford; Wayne Whiting	Mike Crowther; Roger Nicoll; Jane Tullis	Harold Hird (Ind); Cathy McIlhoney (Ind); Mark Parton (Ind); Adam Verwey (Ind); Darren Churchill (-); Eddie Sarkis (-); Barry Smith (Ind)

=== Molonglo ===
Seven seats were up for election. The Labor Party was defending three seats. The Liberal Party was defending three seats. The Greens were defending one seat.

Labor candidates	Liberal candidates	Greens candidates	Motorist candidates	CAP candidates
**Andrew Barr***; Eleanor Bates; **Simon Corbell***; Louise Crossman; **Katy Gallagher***; Mike Hettinger; David Mathews	Belinda Barnier; **Jacqui Burke**; Jeremy Hanson*; Giulia Jones; Gary Kent; **Zed Seselja***; Clinton White	Elena Kirschbaum; Caroline Le Couteur*; Shane Rattenbury*	David Cumbers; Kim Evans; Stuart Green; Angus Laburn; Darren O'Neil; Stephen Rowland; Anthony Seddon	Alvin Hopper; Owen Saddler; Nancy-Louise Scherger; Norvan Vogt
Mulcahy candidates	LDP candidates	Pangallo candidates	Ungrouped candidates	
Joanne Allen; **Richard Mulcahy**; Ben O'Neill	David McAlary; David Pinkerton	Luciano Lombardo; Frank Pangallo; Phil Thompson	Helen Cross (Ind); Tony Farrell (Ind); Greg Tannahill (-); Kerri Taranto (Ind)	

== Results ==
Party	Votes	%	+/–	Seats	+/–
Labor	79,126	37.39	▼9.45	7	▼2
Liberal	66,855	31.59	▲2.58	6	▼1
Greens	33,057	15.62	▲6.32	4	▲3
Motorists	10,553	4.99	New	0	New
Community Alliance	7,730	3.65	New	0	New
Independents	6,961	3.29	▲1.44	0	0
Pangallo Independents	4,252	2.01	New	0	New
Mulcahy Canberra Party	2,341	1.11	New	0	New
Liberal Democratic Party	774	0.37	▼0.94	0	0
Total	211,649	100.00	–	17	–
Valid votes	211,649	96.20			
Invalid/blank votes	8,370	3.80	▲1.1		
Total votes	220,019	100.00	–		
Registered voters/turnout	243,471	90.37	▼2.4		

Results by electorate
	Brindabella			Ginninderra			Molonglo		
Party	Votes	%	Seats	Votes	%	Seats	Votes	%	Seats
Labor	23,123	36.5	2	24,119	40.2	2	31,884	36.1	3
Liberal	22,364	35.3	2	16,683	27.8	2	27,808	31.5	2
Greens	8,600	13.6	1	8,350	13.9	1	16,107	18.2	2
Motorist Party	4,418	7.0	0	3,684	6.1	0	2,451	2.8	0
Community Alliance	4,829	7.6	0	1,897	3.2	0	1,004	1.1	0
Independent	—	—	—	5,316	8.9	0	1,645	1.9	0
Pangallo Independents	—	—	—	—	—	—	4,252	4.8	0
Mulcahy Canberra Party	—	—	—	—	—	—	2,341	2.7	0
Liberal Democrats	—	—	—	—	—	—	774	0.9	0

Electorate	Seats held
Brindabella	
Ginninderra	
Molonglo	

At the close of counting on election night 18 October 2008, with 82.1 per cent of the vote counted Labor had obtained 37.6 per cent of the vote across the ACT, with the Liberals at 31.1 per cent and the Greens at 15.8 per cent. Swings were recorded against both the Labor (-9.3 per cent) and Liberal (-3.7 per cent) parties with a +6.6 per cent swing towards the Greens. Labor won 7 seats, the Liberals won 6 seats, while the Greens won 4 seats, giving them the balance of power, and negotiated with both major parties for the formation of a minority government. After almost two weeks of deliberations, the Greens chose to form a minority government with Labor. The ACT Electoral Commission determined and announced the election's final results on 25 October 2008 after distribution of preferences.

In Brindabella, Labor lost one of its three seats to Greens candidate Amanda Bresnan. Government minister John Hargreaves was re-elected, but Labor backbencher Mick Gentleman was beaten by another Labor candidate, Joy Burch. For the Liberal Party, former leader Brendan Smyth was re-elected, but shadow minister Steve Pratt lost his seat to party colleague Steve Doszpot.

Labor also lost a seat in Ginninderra, where Greens candidate Meredith Hunter was elected. Chief Minister Jon Stanhope and Labor MLA Mary Porter were both re-elected, and on the Liberal ticket sitting MLA Vicki Dunne was joined by Alistair Coe, who replaced retiring Bill Stefaniak.

In seven-member Molonglo, the Liberals lost one seat to the Greens. Labor ministers Katy Gallagher, Andrew Barr and Simon Corbell all won re-election, as did Liberal leader Zed Seselja. Sitting MLA Jacqui Burke lost to Jeremy Hanson for the second Liberal seat. The Greens increased their representation in this seat to two, electing new MLAs Shane Rattenbury and Caroline Le Couteur, the latter at the expense of Liberal-turned-Independent MLA Richard Mulcahy.

== See also ==
- Members of the Australian Capital Territory Legislative Assembly, 2008–2012
