= Steve Doszpot =

Australian politician

Steve Doszpot OAM

Member of the Australian Capital Territory Legislative Assembly for Kurrajong
- In office 15 October 2016 – 25 November 2017
- Succeeded by: Candice Burch

Member of the Australian Capital Territory Legislative Assembly for Molonglo
- In office 20 October 2012 – 15 October 2016

Member of the Australian Capital Territory Legislative Assembly for Brindabella
- In office 29 October 2008 – 20 October 2012

Assistant Speaker of the Australian Capital Territory Legislative Assembly
- In office 27 November 2012 – 22 January 2014
- Preceded by: Vicki Dunne
- Succeeded by: Nicole Lawder

Personal details
- Born: István Doszpot; 23 September 1948 Budapest, Hungary
- Died: 25 November 2017 (aged 69) Barton, Canberra, Australia
- Party: Liberal Party
- Spouse: Maureen Doszpot
- Profession: Politician
- Website: ACT Legislative Assembly profile

Steven John Doszpot OAM (23 September 1948 – 25 November 2017) was an Australian politician and member of the Australian Capital Territory Legislative Assembly from 2008 to 2017. A member of the Liberal Party, he represented the electorate of Brindabella between 2008 and 2012, Molonglo from 2012 to 2016, and Kurrajong from 2016 to his death in 2017. In December 2012, Doszpot was elected as the Assistant Speaker.

== Biography ==
He was born as István Doszpot in Budapest, Hungary and in 1957, aged nine, migrated to Australia with his refugee parents after the Hungarian Revolution of 1956. He completed his secondary education at the Christian Brothers' High School, Lewisham (1961–64). He moved to Canberra in 1974 and was involved in the computer industry as a senior executive with Wang Computers (Australia), Digital Equipment Corporation and Canon Australia, with a brief stint at the CSIRO ICT Centre as the Business Development Manager in Canberra, before his election to the ACT Legislative Assembly in 2008.

He was the Head of SOCOG in Canberra from 1998 to 2000, and managed the Olympic Football Tournament staged in Canberra as part of the Sydney 2000 Olympic Games. He was President of the ACT Olympic Council and Soccer Canberra and a Fellow of the Australian Institute of Company Directors. Following the 2000 Olympic Games, he was awarded the Australian Sports Medal for his long-term commitment and service to the sport.

Doszpot was the Shadow Minister for Education and Training and the Shadow Minister for Sport and Recreation from 2008; the Shadow Minister for Ageing and the Shadow Minister for ICT from 2012. He had previously held shadow portfolios for Multicultural Affairs and for Disability between 2008 and 2012.

On 24 October 2017, Doszpot announced that he would be resigning from the Legislative Assembly on 5 December, after being diagnosed with terminal liver cancer. However, he died from the disease on 25 November, becoming the first Member of the Legislative Assembly to die in office. He was given a state funeral.

== See also ==
- 2008 Australian Capital Territory election
- 2012 Australian Capital Territory election
- Members of the Australian Capital Territory Legislative Assembly, 2008–2012
- Members of the Australian Capital Territory Legislative Assembly, 2012–2016

Political offices
| Preceded by Vicki Dunne | Assistant Speaker; 2012–2014 | Succeeded by Nicole Lawder |
Australian Capital Territory Legislative Assembly
| Preceded by Steve Pratt | Member of the Legislative Assembly for Brindabella; 2008–2012; Served alongside: Burch, Hargreaves, Smyth, Bresnan | Succeeded by Zed Seselja |
| Preceded by Zed Seselja | Member of the Legislative Assembly for Molonglo; 2012–2016; Served alongside: Corbell, Barr, Gallagher, Hanson, Rattenbury, Jones | Electorate abolished |
| Electorate created | Member of the Legislative Assembly for Kurrajong; 2016–2017; Served alongside: Barr, Lee, Rattenbury, Stephen-Smith | Succeeded by Candice Burch |
