= Helen Cross (politician) =

Australian politician (died 2022)

Helen Cross was an Australian politician and was a member of the Australian Capital Territory Legislative Assembly representing the electorate of Molonglo, initially for the Liberal Party, and then later as an Independent.

Cross was elected to the ACT Legislative Assembly at the 2001 election. On 23 September 2002, she resigned from the Liberal Party and remained in the Assembly, from 27 September 2002, as an independent member. Cross ran on her own ticket of the 'Helen Cross Independents' at the 2004 ACT general election; however, she was unsuccessful in defending her seat.

She had an accident in 2014 with her husband David, which caused both of them ongoing health concerns. Cross ran unsuccessfully again for the assembly in 2020 as an independent in the seat of Yerrabi. Cross died in mid July 2022 from what is believed to have been complications from the 2014 accident, of which her husband David also died, predeceasing her in May 2020.
