= Brindabella electorate =

Brindabella Australian Capital Territory—Legislative Assembly
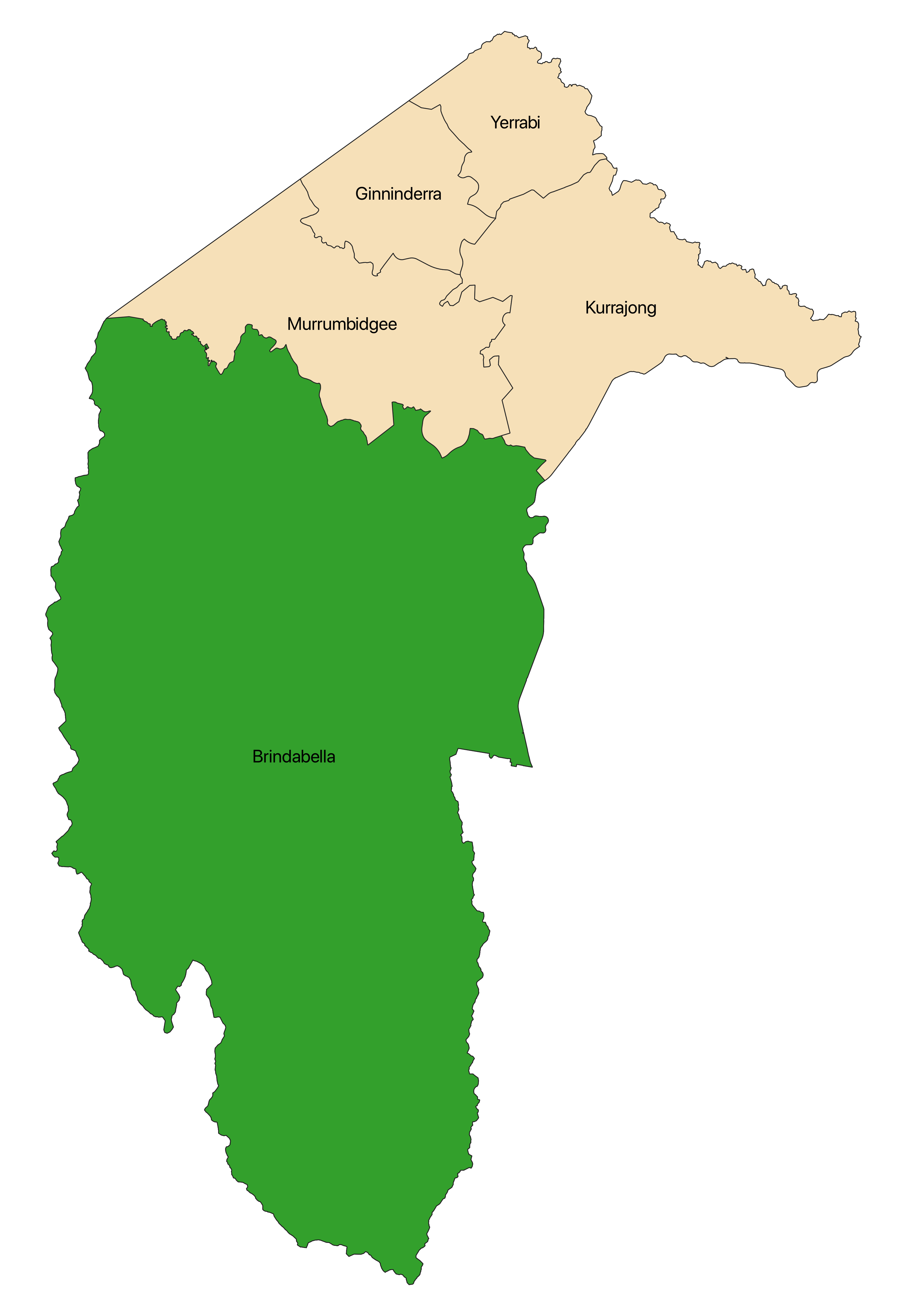
- Territory: Australian Capital Territory
- Created: 1995
- Electors: 61,713 (2020)
- Area: 1,597 km^{2} (616.6 sq mi)
- Federal electorate(s): Bean
- Coordinates: 35°35′6″S 148°57′25″E
Electorates around Brindabella:
Goulburn (NSW)	Murrumbidgee	Kurrajong
Wagga Wagga (NSW)	Brindabella	Monaro (NSW)
Monaro (NSW)	Monaro (NSW)	Monaro (NSW)

The Brindabella electorate is one of the five electorates for the unicameral 25-member Australian Capital Territory Legislative Assembly. It elects five members, and is the largest of the electorates in geographic area.

== History ==
It was created in 1995, when the three-electorate, Hare-Clark electoral system was first introduced for the Australian Capital Territory (ACT). Prior to 1995, a multi-member single constituency existed for the whole of the ACT. "Brindabella" is derived from an indigenous word meaning "two kangaroo rats" and refers to the mountain range to the south and west of the ACT.

== Location ==
The Brindabella electorate consists of the large part of the ACT south of the Murrumbidgee River, although this region is sparsely inhabited.

From 1995 to 2008 it contained the Canberra district of Tuggeranong, excluding Hume, and the Woden Valley suburbs of Chifley, Pearce and Torrens.

In 2008, a boundary re-distribution by the Australian Capital Territory Electoral Commission, resulted in the electorate covering the Woden Valley suburb of Farrer.

In the 2016 redistribution, the Woden Valley suburbs, the village of Uriarra, and the suburb of Kambah were transferred into the Murrumbidgee electorate. At the 2019 redistribution, the western side of Kambah was transferred back into Brindabella. At the 2023 redistribution, the rest of Kambah was transferred back into Brindabella.

== Members ==
Year	Member	Party	Member	Party	Member	Party	Member	Party	Member	Party
1995	Bill Wood	Labor	Andrew Whitecross	Labor	Paul Osborne	Independent	Trevor Kaine	Liberal	Tony De Domenico	Liberal
1997^{1}	Bill Wood	Labor	Andrew Whitecross	Labor	Paul Osborne	Independent	Trevor Kaine	Liberal	Louise Littlewood	Liberal
1998	Bill Wood	Labor	John Hargreaves	Labor	Paul Osborne	Independent	Trevor Kaine	Liberal	Brendan Smyth	Liberal
1998^{2}	Bill Wood	Labor	John Hargreaves	Labor	Paul Osborne	Independent	Trevor Kaine	Canberra Liberals	Brendan Smyth	Liberal
1998^{2}	Bill Wood	Labor	John Hargreaves	Labor	Paul Osborne	Independent	Trevor Kaine	United Canberra	Brendan Smyth	Liberal
2001	Bill Wood	Labor	John Hargreaves	Labor	Karin MacDonald	Labor	Steve Pratt	Liberal	Brendan Smyth	Liberal
2004	Mick Gentleman	Labor	John Hargreaves	Labor	Karin MacDonald	Labor	Steve Pratt	Liberal	Brendan Smyth	Liberal
2008	Joy Burch	Labor	John Hargreaves	Labor	Amanda Bresnan	Greens	Steve Doszpot	Liberal	Brendan Smyth	Liberal
2012	Joy Burch	Labor	Mick Gentleman	Labor	Andrew Wall	Liberal	Zed Seselja	Liberal	Brendan Smyth	Liberal
2013^{3}	Joy Burch	Labor	Mick Gentleman	Labor	Andrew Wall	Liberal	Nicole Lawder	Liberal	Brendan Smyth	Liberal
2016^{4}	Joy Burch	Labor	Mick Gentleman	Labor	Andrew Wall	Liberal	Nicole Lawder	Liberal	Val Jeffery	Liberal
2016	Joy Burch	Labor	Mick Gentleman	Labor	Andrew Wall	Liberal	Nicole Lawder	Liberal	Mark Parton	Liberal
2020	Joy Burch	Labor	Mick Gentleman	Labor	Johnathan Davis	Greens	Nicole Lawder	Liberal	Mark Parton	Liberal
2023^{5}	Joy Burch	Labor	Mick Gentleman	Labor	Laura Nuttall	Greens	Nicole Lawder	Liberal	Mark Parton	Liberal
2024	Caitlin Tough	Labor	Taimus Werner-Gibbings	Labor	Laura Nuttall	Greens	Deborah Morris	Liberal	Mark Parton	Liberal

^{1} Tony De Domenico (Liberal) resigned on 30 January 1997. Louise Littlewood (Liberal) was elected as his replacement on a countback and was sworn in on 18 February 1997.
^{2} Trevor Kaine was elected on the Liberal ticket. From 1989 to 13 May 1998, Kaine sat as a Liberal. On 28 May 1998, Kaine announced he would sit as a Canberra Liberal, and on 30 July 1998, Kaine announced that he had registered the United Canberra Party and sat in the Assembly as its sole representative.
^{3} Zed Seselja (Liberal) resigned on 11 June 2013. Nicole Lawder (Liberal) was elected as his replacement on a countback on 28 June 2013.
^{4} Brendan Smyth (Liberal) resigned on 15 July 2016. Val Jeffery (Liberal) was elected as his replacement on a countback on 28 July 2016.
^{5} Johnathan Davis (Greens) resigned on 12 November 2023. Laura Nuttall (Greens) was elected as his replacement on a countback on 27 November 2023.

== Election results ==
2024 Australian Capital Territory election: Brindabella
Party	Candidate	Votes	%	±%
Quota		9,708		
Liberal	Mark Parton (elected 1)	9,606	16.5	+5.3
Liberal	Deborah Morris (elected 2)	5,780	9.9	+9.9
Liberal	James Daniels	4,062	7.0	+3.1
Liberal	Sandi Mitra	2,906	5.0	+5.0
Liberal	Rosa Harber	2,781	4.8	+4.8
Labor	Caitlin Tough (elected 3)	6,085	10.4	+10.4
Labor	Taimus Werner-Gibbings (elected 4)	4,867	8.4	+0.2
Labor	Mick Gentleman	4,261	7.3	−4.2
Labor	Louise Crossman	2,790	4.8	+4.8
Labor	Brendan Forde	1,693	2.9	−1.7
Greens	Laura Nuttall (elected 5)	3,244	5.6	+2.6
Greens	Sam Nugent	1,140	2.0	+2.0
Greens	Troy Swan	875	1.5	+1.5
Independents for Canberra	Vanessa Picker	2,411	4.1	+4.1
Independents for Canberra	Elise Searson	1,055	1.8	+1.8
Independents for Canberra	Riley Fernandes	953	1.6	+1.6
Family First	Bruce Gartshore	766	1.3	+1.3
Family First	Merle Graham	667	1.1	+1.1
Animal Justice	Robyn Soxsmith	540	0.9	−0.2
Animal Justice	Gareth Ballard	418	0.7	+0.7
First Nation	Wendy Brookman	328	0.6	+0.6
First Nation	Jack McDougall	241	0.4	+0.4
First Nation	Dylan Robb	177	0.3	+0.3
Independent	Emmanuel Ezekiel-Hart	600	1.0	+1.0
Total formal votes		58,246	97.6	−0.6
Informal votes		1,416	2.4	+0.6
Turnout		59,662	88.3	−2.4
Party total votes
Liberal		25,135	43.2	+4.7
Labor		19,696	33.8	−6.9
Greens		5,259	9.0	−1.8
Independents for Canberra		4,419	7.6	+7.6
Family First		1,433	2.5	+2.5
Animal Justice		958	1.6	−0.6
First Nation		746	1.3	+1.3
Independent	Emmanuel Ezekiel-Hart	600	1.0	+1.0
Liberal hold		Swing	+5.3	
Liberal hold		Swing	+9.9	
Labor hold		Swing	+10.4	
Labor hold		Swing	+0.2	
Greens hold		Swing	+2.6	

== See also ==
- Australian Capital Territory Electoral Commission
- Australian Capital Territory Legislative Assembly
