= Karin MacDonald =

Australian politician

Karin MacDonald (born 16 May 1969) is an Australian politician and was a member of the Australian Capital Territory Legislative Assembly representing the electorate of Brindabella for the Labor Party. MacDonald was elected at the 2001 ACT general election and retired at the 2008 ACT general election.

MacDonald is Jewish. Her maternal grandparents were German Jews who fled just prior to the outbreak of WW2. Her father converted to Judaism when he married her mother.
