= The Community Action Party =

- Founded: 13 June 2008
- Headquarters: Canberra

Website
- www.cap.org.au

The Community Action Party (ACT), formerly The Community Alliance Party, is a minor political party based in the Australian Capital Territory. It was formally registered on 13 June 2008, and states that it is the ACT's fourth oldest political party.

The party nominated nine candidates at the 2008 ACT election, including Val Jeffery who was later elected to the Legislative Assembly in a countback as a Liberal member in 2016. CAP did not contest the 2012 election, but fielded two candidates at the 2016 election at which it received 0.2 percent of the territory-wide vote. The Community Alliance Party renamed to the Community Action Party in 2019.
