= Australian Motorist Party =

Australian Motorists Party
- Chairman: Geoff Develin
- Spokesperson: David Cumbers
- Founded: 13 June 2008
- Headquarters: Fyshwick, Australian Capital Territory

Website
- https://www.motoristsparty.org.au

The Australian Motorists Party (AMP) is an Australian political party dedicated to representing motorist and road users, as well pedestrians, throughout Australia. It was founded by groups of concerned motorists.

== Policies ==
- Safety of drivers and pedestrians
- Issues involving young drivers such as education and training.
- Public transport
- Cost of driving
- Fuel taxes and alternative fuel sources

== History ==
The AMP was formed in May 2007 and became an official registered party in 2008. It ran in each of the three electorate at the 2008 Australian Capital Territory election and used a bus equipped with a public address system to promote their new political party. None of the candidates won the seats they were running for on election night, but Walford made a speech to AMP president, Geoff Develin, to stay positive. In the 2012 Australian Capital Territory election the party ran candidates in each of the three electorates, most notably in Ginninderra, where Summernats organiser Chic Henry contested the seat and secured 6.6% of the vote. The party once again, however failed to have any candidates elected.
