= Richard Mulcahy (Australian politician) =

Australian politician (born 1952)

Member of the ACT Legislative Assembly
- In office 2004–2008
- Succeeded by: Several Candidates due to the multi-member system
- Constituency: Molonglo

Personal details
- Born: 30 June 1952 (age 74)
- Party: Liberal Party; Independent

Richard John Mulcahy (born 30 June 1952), a former Australian politician, was a member of the unicameral Australian Capital Territory Legislative Assembly for one term, from 2004 to 2008, representing the Liberal Party and later as an independent.

Mulcahy was once a member of the left wing of the Labor Party in Tasmania before flipping over to the conservatives.

== Political beliefs ==
A long-term Canberra resident, Mulcahy entered the Legislative Assembly after becoming concerned with the quality of core services in Canberra – especially the health and education systems.

He was committed to efficiency in Government and introduced several pieces of legislation to provide taxation relief for the people of Canberra.

== Early career ==
Originally from Tasmania, Richard Mulcahy has enjoyed a highly successful career in business and other roles before entering politics. He was the Principal Personal Assistant to the former Premier of Victoria, the late Sir Rupert Hamer and has also advised a number of other Parliamentary figures. He also served in Chief Executive roles with the Confectionery Manufacturers of Australia as well as other industry organisations including the advertising, hotel, agriculture, and, most recently, lighting industries. At one time he was a Director (Dental Programs- Worldwide) of the William Wrigley Jr. Company based in Chicago, USA. He also held appointments with the US Government and later the Canadian Government. He also has served in Chief Executive roles and was chief executive officer of Lighting Council Australia having been appointed in 2017 Richard Mulcahy also served on the staff of former Liberal Senator, the late Senator The Hon John Marriott, then the late Hon Michael Hodgman MP (father of a former Tasmanian Premier) and the late Sir Max Bingham QC, former Leader of the Opposition in Tasmania. In 2024 he became a Director of the Mulcahy Consulting Group and in April 2025 was appointed independent Chair of the Victorian Forest Products Association.

== Other ==
Richard Mulcahy is also adjunct professor in the Business, Economics and Law Faculty at the University of Queensland, a position he has held since 2004, and is a Life Member Keeper of the Quaich conferred at Blair Castle, Scotland, by the Earl of Erroll in 2002.

He was also awarded the Centenary Medal by the Australian Government in 2003.

Mulcahy also played a key role in the famous Dollar Sweets Industrial dispute in 1985 alongside former Federal Treasurer Peter Costello. Dollar Sweets dispute

== ACT Legislative Assembly ==
Mulcahy entered the Legislative Assembly in 2004 as a Member of the Liberal Party. A strong campaign resulted in the highest vote of all Liberal candidates in the electorate of Molonglo. and was seen instantly by members of the public and media as a candidate for the Liberal leadership. Mulcahy was appointed to the Shadow Treasury position.

During his time in the Legislative Assembly, Richard Mulcahy served as Shadow Treasurer and Shadow Minister for Industrial Relations, Heritage, Environment and Water, Territory-owned Corporations, Ageing, Arts, Deputy Leader of the Opposition, and Chair of the Standing Committee on Public Accounts.
