= Amanda Bresnan =

Australian politician (born 1971)

Amanda Bresnan MLA
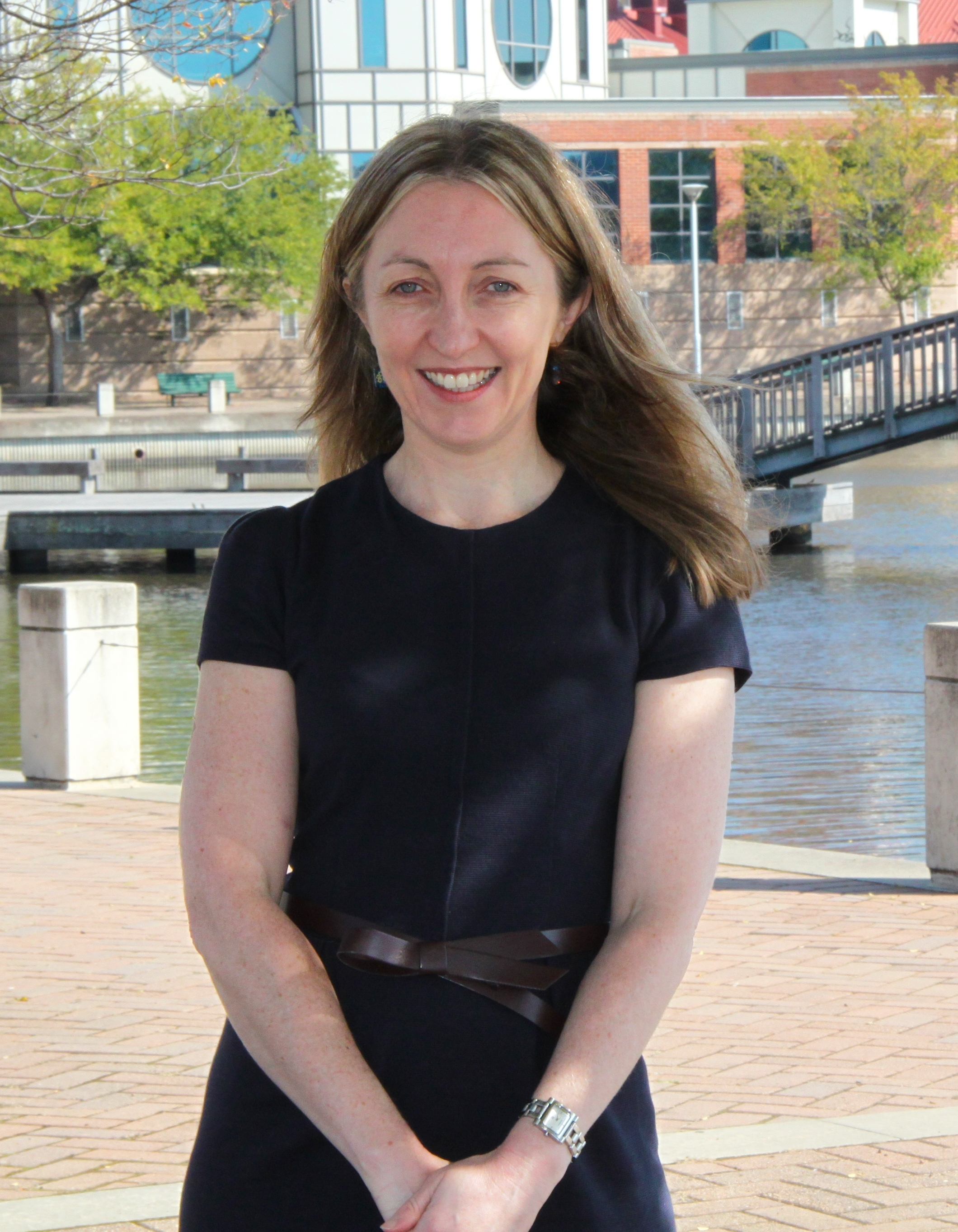
- Amanda Bresnan MLA ACT Greens Member for Brindabella

Member of the ACT Legislative Assembly
- In office 18 October 2008 – 20 October 2012
- Preceded by: Karin MacDonald
- Succeeded by: Andrew Wall
- Constituency: Brindabella

Personal details
- Born: 4 December 1971 (age 54)
- Party: ACT Greens
- Education: Griffith University
- Occupation: Politician
- Website: http://www.act.greens.org.au

Amanda Bresnan (born 4 December 1971) is an Australian politician and a former member of the Australian Capital Territory Legislative Assembly. Bresnan was elected to the ACT Legislative Assembly representing the electorate of Brindabella for the ACT Greens at the 2008 election and defeated at the 2012 election

== Early life and education ==
Amanda Bresnan was raised in Brisbane and studied at Griffith University. She moved to Canberra to work in policy development in the public and community sectors. Initially, Bresnan entered the ACT Government's Graduate Program and later became a senior policy officer in ACT Health. She went on to become policy manager for the Consumers' Health Forum of Australia and the director of policy at the Mental Health Council of Australia.

== Political career ==
Bresnan ran for election for the electorate of Molonglo in the 2004 ACT Election representing the ACT Greens. She was unsuccessful in winning a seat in the multi-member electorate. However, the Greens' lead candidate, Deb Foskey, was elected.

In the 2007 Australian federal election, Bresnan ran for the House of Representatives seat of Canberra, again representing the Australian Greens. The candidature of Bresnan and Meredith Hunter for the House of Representatives was part of an extensive campaign in the ACT to elect Kerrie Tucker end coalition control of the Australian Senate immediately after the election, as territory Senators take their place at this time as opposed to their state counterparts in the following July. The ACT holds two seats with only three-year terms, so a larger quota than normal is required for election. Despite a swing of 5.1 percent to the Greens on 21.5 percent, their best result in any state or territory, the party fell narrowly short.

In June 2008, the ACT Greens announced that Bresnan would again stand for election, this time in Brindabella, at the upcoming election. Independent polling released in October suggested the Green vote had doubled to tripled since the last election at the expense of Labor, with the Liberal vote remaining relatively unchanged. Commentators predicted the Greens would hold the balance of power and decide who forms government. The Greens stated they were willing to court both major parties. At the close of counting on election night, with 82.1 per cent of the vote counted, Labor had obtained 37.6 per cent of the vote across the ACT, with the Liberals at 31.1 per cent and the Greens at 15.8 per cent. Swings were recorded against both the Labor (-9.3 per cent) and Liberal (-3.7 per cent) parties with a +6.6 per cent swing towards the Greens. This resulted in the election of Bresnan, Meredith Hunter, Shane Rattenbury and Caroline Le Couteur. Rattenbury became the sole member for the Greens in 2012 as the rest of the Greens MLAs were defeated.

== Parliamentary career ==
While in parliament, Bresnan held the portfolios of Health, Mental Health, Transport, Disability, Housing, Ageing, Multicultural Affairs, Industrial Relations and Corrections. She was also the ACT Greens' Party Whip.

== See also ==
- 2008 Australian Capital Territory election
- Members of the Australian Capital Territory Legislative Assembly, 2008–2012
