= Nicole Lawder =

Australian politician

Nicole Lawder MLA

Member of the Australian Capital Territory Legislative Assembly for Brindabella
- In office 28 June 2013 – 6 November 2024
- Preceded by: Zed Seselja
- Succeeded by: Deborah Morris

Personal details
- Born: 31 July 1962 (age 64) Malaysia
- Party: Liberal Party
- Education: Australian National University; Swinburne University of Technology

Nicole Ann Lawder (born 31 July 1962) is an Australian politician. She was a Liberal member of the Australian Capital Territory Legislative Assembly from June 2013 to November 2024, when she retired from politics, and served as Deputy Leader of the Opposition from October 2016 to October 2020.

Lawder was born in Malaysia to a military family. She received a Bachelor of Arts in Psychology from the Australian National University, having moved to Canberra in 1988. She also received a Masters in Business from Swinburne University of Technology. A member of the National People with Disability and Carer Council (2008–13) and the ACMA Consumer Consultative Forum (2009–13), she was CEO of Homelessness Australia and the Deafness Forum of Australia. In 2012 she was the Liberal Party's Southern Electorate Branch Deputy President, and ran as a candidate at the 2012 ACT election for the seat of Brindabella. Although she was unsuccessful, she was elected on 28 June 2013 in a countback following the resignation of Zed Seselja.
