= Zed Seselja =

Australian politician

The Honourable Zed Seselja
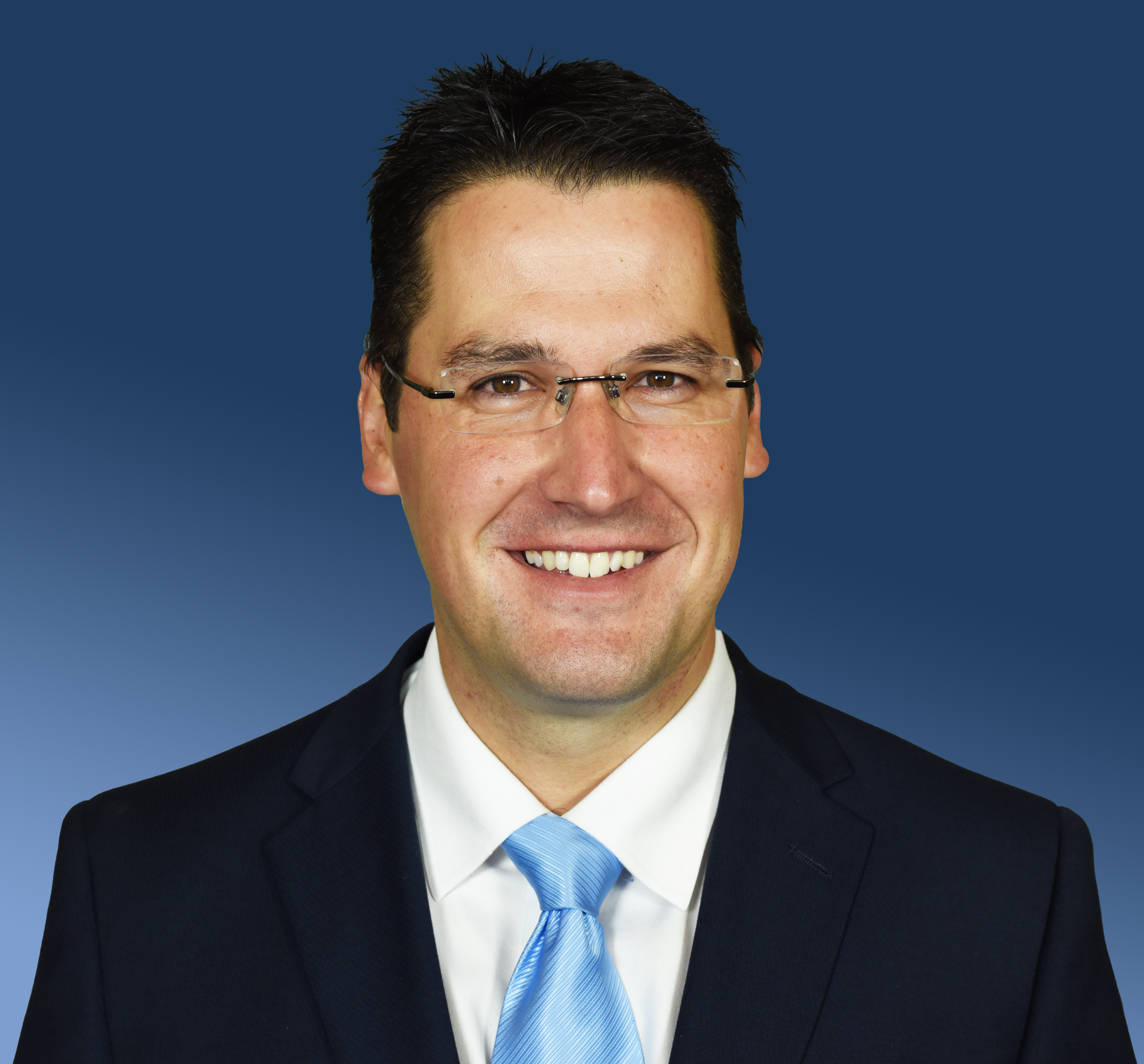

Minister for International Development and the Pacific
- In office 22 December 2020 – 23 May 2022
- Prime Minister: Scott Morrison
- Preceded by: Alex Hawke
- Succeeded by: Pat Conroy

Assistant Minister for Finance, Charities and Electoral Matters
- In office 29 May 2019 – 22 December 2020
- Prime Minister: Scott Morrison
- Preceded by: Himself (Treasury and Finance)
- Succeeded by: Ben Morton as Assistant Minister for Electoral Matters

Assistant Minister for Treasury and Finance
- In office 28 August 2018 – 29 May 2019
- Prime Minister: Scott Morrison
- Preceded by: David Coleman
- Succeeded by: Himself; Jane Hume

Assistant Minister for Science, Jobs and Innovation
- In office 20 December 2017 – 28 August 2018
- Prime Minister: Malcolm Turnbull
- Minister: Michaelia Cash
- Preceded by: Craig Laundy as Assistant Minister for Industry, Innovation and Science
- Succeeded by: vacant

Assistant Minister for Social Services and Multicultural Affairs
- In office 18 July 2016 – 20 December 2017
- Prime Minister: Malcolm Turnbull
- Minister: Christian Porter
- Preceded by: Craig Laundy (as Assistant Minister for Multicultural Affairs)
- Succeeded by: Alan Tudge (as Minister for Citizenship and Multicultural Affairs

Senator for the Australian Capital Territory
- In office 7 September 2013 – 20 May 2022
- Preceded by: Gary Humphries
- Succeeded by: David Pocock

Leader of the Opposition of the Australian Capital Territory
- In office 13 December 2007 – 11 February 2013
- Preceded by: Bill Stefaniak
- Succeeded by: Jeremy Hanson

Member of the Australian Capital Territory Legislative Assembly for Brindabella
- In office 6 November 2012 – 11 June 2013
- Preceded by: Amanda Bresnan
- Succeeded by: Nicole Lawder

Member of the Australian Capital Territory Legislative Assembly for Molonglo
- In office 16 October 2004 – 6 November 2012
- Preceded by: Greg Cornwell
- Succeeded by: Giulia Jones

Personal details
- Born: Zdenko Matthew Seselja; 27 March 1977 (age 49) Canberra, Australian Capital Territory, Australia
- Party: Liberal Party
- Education: Australian National University, University of Canberra
- Website: Official Website

Zdenko Matthew "Zed" Seselja (Croatian: [zdeŋko seseʎa]; born 27 March 1977) is an Australian politician who was a senator for the Australian Capital Territory from 2013 to 2022, representing the Liberal Party. He was the minister for international development and the Pacific in the Morrison government from December 2020 to May 2022, and previously served as an assistant minister in the Morrison and Turnbull governments since 2016.

Seselja was previously a member of the Australian Capital Territory Legislative Assembly from 2004 to 2013, and served as leader of the Canberra Liberals and Leader of the Opposition from 2007 to 2013.

== Early life and education ==
Seselja was born in Canberra Hospital, to parents Ljudevit and Katica Seselja, both of whom emigrated separately from Croatia (when it was part of Yugoslavia). His father arrived in 1967. His mother arrived in late 1970 and five months later they married. Both held two jobs each.

Seselja attended St Mary MacKillop College. He graduated from the Australian National University with a Bachelor of Arts degree in 1997, a Bachelor of Laws degree in 1999 and a Graduate Diploma in Legal Practice in 2002. He received a Graduate Certificate in Public Administration in 2000 from the University of Canberra. He was admitted as a legal practitioner in 2002.

While attending university, he worked at a Woolworths supermarket from 1995 to 1998; at MacKillop Catholic College (now St Mary MacKillop College) in 1998 as a cleaner; at the Australian Fisheries Management Authority from 1998 to 1999 as a legal assistant; and at the Commonwealth Department of Transport and Regional Services from 2000 to 2004 as a policy officer, lawyer, and then a senior lawyer.

== Political career ==
=== Australian Capital Territory ===
At the 2008 election, Seselja received a quota of 1.49 and was elected first in the seven-member Molonglo electorate. There was a decrease in the vote for both major parties, with a swing to the Greens. Labor won 7 seats, the Liberals won 6 seats, while the Greens won 4 seats, giving them the balance of power. Negotiations ensued between the Greens and both major parties over the formation of a government. After almost two weeks of deliberations, the Greens chose to support a minority Labor government, thereby consigning Seselja's party to the opposition benches.

At the 2012 election, Seselja moved to the five member Brindabella electorate where he received a quota of 1.8. He led the Canberra Liberals to their highest-ever number of seats, claiming eight in the seventeen-member ACT Legislative Assembly.

=== Federal politics ===
On 4 February 2013, Seselja stated he would challenge incumbent Senator Gary Humphries (who was also a former ACT Liberal leader) for Liberal Party pre-selection for the Senate in the 2013 Australian federal election. Seselja stated he would stand down from leadership of the party in the Legislative Assembly as of Monday 11 February. On 23 February 2013, Seselja won his pre-selection bid, and thus became one of the two official Liberal Party Senate candidates for the ACT.

Seselja was elected Senator for the Australian Capital Territory at the 2013 federal election. In 2014, his former opponent Katy Gallagher resigned as ACT Chief Minister to become the ALP Senator from the ACT. With the ACT having two Senate seats, the ACT was represented in the Senate by the two former territory leaders.

During the 2016 Turnbull government second ministerial reshuffle Seselja was appointed as the Assistant Minister for Social Services and Multicultural Affairs. In December 2017 as part of a subsequent rearrangement of the Turnbull ministry, Seselja was appointed as the Assistant Minister for Science, Jobs and Innovation. In August 2018, he resigned from the Turnbull ministry as part of the failed attempt to have Peter Dutton replace Malcolm Turnbull as leader of the Liberal Party and Prime Minister.

When Scott Morrison succeeded Turnbull as prime minister in August 2018, Seselja was appointed Assistant Minister for Treasury and Finance. His portfolio was changed to Assistant Minister for Finance, Charities and Electoral Matters in May 2019 following the 2019 federal election.

Seselja was appointed Minister for International Development and the Pacific on 22 December 2020.

On 12 April 2022, Seselja flew to the Solomon Islands over a military deal that the Pacific nation was to conclude with China. The deal would allow China to station navy ships and military personnel in order to protect its investment infrastructure. The mission, supported by both of Australia's major parties and taking place during a "caretaker" period in which Seselja fought for his re-election to the Australian Senate, was considered by observers to reflect strategic anxieties over the deal, which extended to allies New Zealand and the United States. The deal was signed days later.

He was unseated at the 2022 federal election by the independent candidate, David Pocock.

=== Political views ===
Seselja is a member of the National Right faction of the Liberal Party.

Seselja's political views have been described as conservative and aligned with the views of former Prime Minister Tony Abbott, although he is a republican. He opposes same-sex marriage, supports cutting penalty rates, and opposes assisted suicide. Seselja abstained from the Senate vote on same-sex marriage in November 2017, despite having promised to honour the national postal result three months earlier.

On 15 August 2018, he voted 'no' to the Restoring Territory Rights (Assisted Suicide Legislation) Bill 2015, which would have restored to the Australian Capital Territory Legislative Assembly the authority to legislate on the matter of voluntary assisted dying.

== Personal life ==
Seselja is a Roman Catholic. He and his wife Roslyn have five children. He is currently a patron/supporter of Karinya House, a member of the Australian Republic Movement and the Australian Red Cross, a volunteer for St. Vincent de Paul, and a KeepWatch Ambassador with the Royal Lifesaving Society (since 2008); he was formerly a mentor for Menslink from 2001 to 2004.

Political offices
| Preceded by Alex Hawke | Minister for International Development and the Pacific; 2020–2022 | Succeeded by Pat Conroy |
| Preceded by Craig Laundy as Assistant Minister for Industry, Innovation and Science | Assistant Minister for Science, Jobs and Innovation; 2017–2018 | Position abolished |
| Preceded by Craig Laundy as Assistant Minister for Multicultural Affairs | Assistant Minister for Social Services and Multicultural Affairs; 2016–2017 | Succeeded by Alan Tudge as Minister for Citizenship and Multicultural Affairs |
Australian Capital Territory Legislative Assembly
| Preceded by Greg Cornwell | Member for Molonglo; 2004–2012 | Succeeded by Giulia Jones |
| Preceded by Steve Doszpot | Member for Brindabella; 2012–2013 | Succeeded by Nicole Lawder |
Political offices
| Preceded by Bill Stefaniak | Leader of the Opposition of the Australian Capital Territory; 2007–2013 | Succeeded by Jeremy Hanson |
Party political offices
| Preceded by Bill Stefaniak | Leader of the Liberal Party in the Australian Capital Territory; 2007–2013 | Succeeded by Jeremy Hanson |
