= John Hargreaves (ACT politician) =

Australian politician

John Leo Hargreaves (born 27 April 1949) is a retired Australian politician. He was a Labor Party member of the Australian Capital Territory Legislative Assembly from 1998 to 2012. He acted as Minister for Territory and Municipal Services, Minister for Multicultural Affairs and Minister for Housing.

On 12 October 2009 Hargreaves announced his resignation as Minister from the Labor Cabinet although he stated that he intended to continue in his role as MLA for Brindabella. He retired from politics in 2012.
