= Results of the 2024 Australian Capital Territory election =

This is a list of Legislative Assembly results for the 2024 Australian Capital Territory election.

== Results summary ==
Australian Capital Territory election, 19 October 2024 Legislative Assembly << 2020–2028 >>
Enrolled voters	321,721				
Votes cast	279,370		Turnout	86.8%	−2.5
Informal votes	5,347		Informal	1.9%	+0.5
Summary of votes by party
Party	Primary votes	%	Swing	Seats	Change
Labor	93,571	34.1	−3.7	10	±0
Liberal	91,659	33.4	−0.4	9	±0
Greens	36,369	12.2	−1.3	4	−2
Independents for Canberra	23,329	8.5	+8.5	1	+1
Fiona Carrick Independent	7,303	2.7	+2.7	1	+1
Family First	6,643	2.4	+2.4	0	±0
Animal Justice	3,703	1.4	−0.4	0	±0
First Nation	3,586	1.3	+1.3	0	±0
Independent	3,540	1.3	−8.2	0	±0
Belco	3,508	1.3	−0.7	0	±0
Democratic Labour	2,283	0.8	−0.6	0	±0
Strong Independents	1,131	0.4	+0.4	0	±0
Libertarian	399	0.1	−0.3	0	±0
Total	274,023			25	

== Results by electorate ==
=== Brindabella ===
2024 Australian Capital Territory election: Brindabella
Party	Candidate	Votes	%	±%
Quota		9,708		
Liberal	Mark Parton (elected 1)	9,606	16.5	+5.3
Liberal	Deborah Morris (elected 2)	5,780	9.9	+9.9
Liberal	James Daniels	4,062	7.0	+3.1
Liberal	Sandi Mitra	2,906	5.0	+5.0
Liberal	Rosa Harber	2,781	4.8	+4.8
Labor	Caitlin Tough (elected 3)	6,085	10.4	+10.4
Labor	Taimus Werner-Gibbings (elected 4)	4,867	8.4	+0.2
Labor	Mick Gentleman	4,261	7.3	−4.2
Labor	Louise Crossman	2,790	4.8	+4.8
Labor	Brendan Forde	1,693	2.9	−1.7
Greens	Laura Nuttall (elected 5)	3,244	5.6	+2.6
Greens	Sam Nugent	1,140	2.0	+2.0
Greens	Troy Swan	875	1.5	+1.5
Independents for Canberra	Vanessa Picker	2,411	4.1	+4.1
Independents for Canberra	Elise Searson	1,055	1.8	+1.8
Independents for Canberra	Riley Fernandes	953	1.6	+1.6
Family First	Bruce Gartshore	766	1.3	+1.3
Family First	Merle Graham	667	1.1	+1.1
Animal Justice	Robyn Soxsmith	540	0.9	−0.2
Animal Justice	Gareth Ballard	418	0.7	+0.7
First Nation	Wendy Brookman	328	0.6	+0.6
First Nation	Jack McDougall	241	0.4	+0.4
First Nation	Dylan Robb	177	0.3	+0.3
Independent	Emmanuel Ezekiel-Hart	600	1.0	+1.0
Total formal votes		58,246	97.6	−0.6
Informal votes		1,416	2.4	+0.6
Turnout		59,662	88.3	−2.4
Party total votes
Liberal		25,135	43.2	+4.7
Labor		19,696	33.8	−6.9
Greens		5,259	9.0	−1.8
Independents for Canberra		4,419	7.6	+7.6
Family First		1,433	2.5	+2.5
Animal Justice		958	1.6	−0.6
First Nation		746	1.3	+1.3
Independent	Emmanuel Ezekiel-Hart	600	1.0	+1.0
Liberal hold		Swing	+5.3	
Liberal hold		Swing	+9.9	
Labor hold		Swing	+10.4	
Labor hold		Swing	+0.2	
Greens hold		Swing	+2.6	

=== Ginninderra ===
2024 Australian Capital Territory election: Ginninderra
Party	Candidate	Votes	%	±%
Quota		9,343		
Labor	Tara Cheyne (elected 1)	7,813	13.9	+2.6
Labor	Yvette Berry (elected 2)	7,727	13.8	−1.8
Labor	Heidi Prowse	2,190	3.9	+3.9
Labor	Tim Bavinton	2,095	3.7	+3.7
Labor	Sean Sadimoen	1,001	1.8	+1.8
Liberal	Peter Cain (elected 3)	5,782	10.3	+4.8
Liberal	Chiaka Barry (elected 5)	3,601	6.4	+6.4
Liberal	Joe Prevedello	2,894	5.2	+5.2
Liberal	Darren Roberts	2,494	4.4	+4.4
Greens	Jo Clay (elected 4)	3,426	6.1	−0.1
Greens	Adele Sinclair	2,090	3.7	+3.7
Greens	Dani Hunter	1,238	2.2	+2.2
Greens	Tim Liersch	1,126	2.0	−0.3
Independents for Canberra	Mark Richardson	2,116	3.8	+3.8
Independents for Canberra	Leanne Foresti	1,443	2.6	+2.6
Independents for Canberra	Suzanne Nucifora	670	1.2	+1.2
Belco	Bill Stefaniak	1,527	2.7	−1.3
Belco	Alan Tutt	696	1.2	+0.1
Belco	Angela Lount	397	0.7	−0.2
Family First	Elizabeth Kikkert	1,926	3.4	−5.9
Family First	Andrew Wallace	445	0.8	+0.8
Family First	Sunil Baby	223	0.4	+0.4
Animal Justice	Lara Drew	514	0.9	−0.1
Animal Justice	Carolyne Drew	443	0.8	+0.1
Democratic Labour	Helen Crowe	223	0.4	+0.4
Democratic Labour	Maxwell Spencer	152	0.3	+0.3
Democratic Labour	John Vandenburgh	149	0.3	+0.3
Democratic Labour	Douglas Cooper	146	0.3	+0.3
Democratic Labour	Rick Howard	129	0.2	+0.2
Independent	Janine Haskins	643	1.1	+1.1
Libertarian	Guy Jakeman	221	0.4	−0.1
Libertarian	Arved von Brasch	178	0.3	+0.3
Independent	Mignonne Cullen	324	0.6	−0.7
Total formal votes		56,052	98.0	−0.5
Informal votes		1,156	2.0	+0.5
Turnout		57,208	86.9	−2.2
Party total votes
Labor		20,826	37.2	−2.8
Liberal		14,771	26.4	−0.4
Greens		7,880	14.1	+1.6
Independents for Canberra		4,229	7.5	+7.5
Belco		2,620	4.7	−4.7
Family First		2,594	4.6	+4.6
Animal Justice		957	1.7	−0.0
Democratic Labour		809	1.4	−1.0
Independent	Janine Haskins	643	1.1	+1.1
Libertarian		399	0.7	−0.1
Independent	Mignonne Cullen	324	0.6	−0.7
Labor hold		Swing	+2.6	
Labor hold		Swing	−1.8	
Liberal hold		Swing	+4.8	
Liberal hold		Swing	+6.4	
Greens hold		Swing	−0.1	

=== Kurrajong ===
2024 Australian Capital Territory election: Kurrajong
Party	Candidate	Votes	%	±%
Quota		8,154		
Labor	Andrew Barr (elected 1)	10,337	21.1	−0.9
Labor	Rachel Stephen-Smith (elected 3)	3,500	7.2	+1.7
Labor	Marina Talevski	1,425	2.9	+2.9
Labor	Aggi Court	1,263	2.6	+2.6
Labor	Martin Greenwood	1,153	2.4	+2.4
Liberal	Elizabeth Lee (elected 2)	6,861	14.0	+4.0
Liberal	Patrick Pentony	2,219	4.5	−0.2
Liberal	Sarah Luscombe	1,143	2.3	+2.3
Liberal	Ramon Bouckaert	899	1.8	+1.8
Liberal	Efthimios Calatzis	764	1.6	+1.6
Greens	Shane Rattenbury (elected 4)	4,087	8.4	−4.2
Greens	Rebecca Vassarotti	2,296	4.7	−1.4
Greens	Isabel Mudford	1,126	2.3	+2.3
Greens	Jillian Reid	668	1.4	+1.4
Greens	James Cruz	456	0.9	+0.9
Independents for Canberra	Thomas Emerson (elected 5)	4,817	9.8	+9.8
Independents for Canberra	Sara Poguet	618	1.3	+1.3
Independents for Canberra	Ben Johnston	527	1.1	+1.1
Independents for Canberra	Sue Read	476	1.0	+1.0
Independents for Canberra	Tenzin Mayne	183	0.4	+0.4
First Nation	Paul Girrawah House	962	2.0	+2.0
First Nation	Jessika Spencer	99	0.2	+0.2
First Nation	Thaddeus Connors	89	0.2	+0.2
First Nation	Rhiannon Connors	88	0.2	+0.2
First Nation	Harrison Pike	85	0.2	+0.2
Strong Independents	Peter Strong	607	1.2	+1.2
Strong Independents	Ann Bray	524	1.1	+1.1
Animal Justice	Teresa McTaggart	342	0.7	+0.7
Animal Justice	Walter Kudrycz	302	0.6	+0.6
Family First	Jenny Hentzschel	309	0.6	+0.6
Family First	Andrew Charles Adair	299	0.6	+0.6
Independent	Marilena Damiano	238	0.5	+0.1
Democratic Labour	Belinda Haley	87	0.2	+0.2
Democratic Labour	Boston White	73	0.1	+0.1
Total formal votes		48,922	98.5	−0.4
Informal votes		750	1.5	+0.4
Turnout		49,672	82.9	−3.2
Party total votes
Labor		17,678	36.1	−1.8
Liberal		11,886	24.3	−3.3
Greens		8,633	17.6	−5.4
Independents for Canberra		6,621	13.5	+13.5
First Nation		1,323	2.7	+2.7
Strong Independents		1,131	2.3	+2.3
Animal Justice		644	1.3	−0.2
Family First		608	1.2	+1.2
Independent	Marilena Damiano	238	0.5	+0.1
Democratic Labour		160	0.3	+0.3
Labor hold		Swing	−0.9	
Labor hold		Swing	+1.7	
Liberal hold		Swing	+4.0	
Greens hold		Swing	−4.2	
Independents for Canberra gain from Greens		Swing	+9.8	

=== Murrumbidgee ===
2024 Australian Capital Territory election: Murrumbidgee
Party	Candidate	Votes	%	±%
Quota		9,309		
Liberal	Jeremy Hanson (elected 1)	7,380	13.2	−2.1
Liberal	Ed Cocks (elected 4)	4,027	7.2	+2.3
Liberal	Amardeep Singh	4,019	7.2	+1.2
Liberal	Karen Walsh	2,486	4.5	+4.5
Liberal	Elyse Heslehurst	1,666	3.0	+3.0
Labor	Chris Steel (elected 2)	6,345	11.4	−2.4
Labor	Marisa Paterson (elected 5)	5,176	9.3	+1.5
Labor	Nelson Tang	3,542	6.3	+6.3
Labor	Anna Whitty	1,990	3.6	+3.6
Labor	Noor El-Asadi	1,476	2.6	+2.6
Fiona Carrick Independent	Fiona Carrick (elected 3)	6,691	12.0	+5.0
Fiona Carrick Independent	Marea Fatseas	341	0.6	+0.6
Fiona Carrick Independent	Bruce Paine	271	0.5	+0.5
Greens	Emma Davidson	2,967	5.3	−1.5
Greens	Sam Carter	840	1.5	+1.5
Greens	Harini Rangarajan	791	1.4	+1.4
Greens	Michael Brewer	605	1.1	+1.1
Independents for Canberra	Paula McGrady	792	1.4	+1.4
Independents for Canberra	Anne-Louise Dawes	624	1.1	+1.1
Independents for Canberra	Nathan Naicker	593	1.1	+1.1
Independents for Canberra	Robert Knight	375	0.7	+0.7
Independents for Canberra	Kathleen Bolt	356	0.6	+0.6
Family First	Andrew Copp	503	0.9	+0.9
Family First	Andy Verri	389	0.7	+0.7
Independent	Rima Diab	862	1.5	+1.5
Animal Justice	Gwenda Griffiths	389	0.7	+0.7
Animal Justice	Ashleigh Griffiths-Smith	353	0.6	+0.6
Total formal votes		55,849	98.4	−0.4
Informal votes		930	1.6	+0.4
Turnout		56,779	88.1	−2.7
Party total votes
Liberal		19,578	35.1	−0.5
Labor		18,529	33.2	−2.9
Fiona Carrick Independent		7,303	13.1	+13.1
Greens		5,203	9.3	−2.4
Independents for Canberra		2,740	4.9	+4.9
Family First		892	1.6	+1.6
Independent	Rima Diab	862	1.5	+1.5
Animal Justice		742	1.3	−0.7
Liberal hold		Swing	−2.1	
Liberal hold		Swing	+2.3	
Labor hold		Swing	−2.4	
Labor hold		Swing	+1.5	
Fiona Carrick Independent gain from Greens		Swing	+5.0	

=== Yerrabi ===
2024 Australian Capital Territory election: Yerrabi
Party	Candidate	Votes	%	±%
Quota		9,160		
Liberal	Leanne Castley (elected 3)	6,745	12.3	+3.7
Liberal	James Milligan (elected 4)	5,681	10.3	+3.1
Liberal	John Mikita	4,032	7.3	+7.3
Liberal	Krishna Nadimpalli	2,721	5.0	+1.4
Liberal	Ralitsa Dimitrova	1,110	2.0	+2.0
Labor	Michael Pettersson (elected 1)	6,495	11.8	+2.3
Labor	Suzanne Orr (elected 2)	4,906	8.9	+0.8
Labor	Mallika Raj	2,689	4.9	+4.9
Labor	Pradeep Sornaraj	1,679	3.1	+3.1
Labor	Ravinder Sahni	1,073	2.0	+2.0
Greens	Andrew Braddock (elected 5)	3,308	6.0	−0.4
Greens	Soelily Consen-Lynch	1,853	3.4	+3.4
Greens	Alex Gias	1,232	2.2	+2.2
Independents for Canberra	David Pollard	2,769	5.0	+2.4
Independents for Canberra	Sneha KC	1,642	3.0	+3.0
Independents for Canberra	Trent Pollard	460	0.8	+0.8
Independents for Canberra	Vikram Kulkarni	449	0.8	+0.8
First Nation	Cooper Pike	969	1.8	+1.8
First Nation	Lisa Barnes	191	0.3	+0.3
First Nation	Michael Duncan	142	0.3	+0.3
First Nation	Tyson Powell	127	0.2	+0.2
First Nation	Kye Moggridge	88	0.2	+0.2
Democratic Labour	Michael Hanna	821	1.5	+1.5
Democratic Labour	Colin Jory	493	0.9	+0.9
Family First	Greg Amos	706	1.3	+1.3
Family First	Henry Kivimaki	410	0.7	+0.7
Belco	Jason Taylor	584	1.1	+1.1
Belco	Gregory Burke	304	0.6	+0.6
Independent	Fuxin Li	502	0.9	−0.3
Animal Justice	Joanne McKinley	402	0.7	+0.7
Independent	Mohammad Munir Hussain	371	0.7	+0.5
Total formal votes		54,954	98.0	−0.5
Informal votes		1,095	2.0	+0.5
Turnout		56,049	87.6	−2.0
Party total votes
Liberal		20,289	36.9	−3.7
Labor		16,842	30.6	−3.5
Greens		6,393	11.6	+1.5
Independents for Canberra		5,320	9.7	+9.7
First Nation		1,517	2.8	+2.8
Democratic Labour		1,314	2.4	−2.3
Family First		1,116	2.0	+2.0
Belco		888	1.6	+1.6
Independent	Fuxin Li	502	0.9	−0.3
Animal Justice		402	0.7	−0.6
Independent	Mohammad Munir Hussain	371	0.7	+0.5
Liberal hold		Swing	+3.7	
Liberal hold		Swing	+3.1	
Labor hold		Swing	+2.3	
Labor hold		Swing	+0.8	
Greens hold		Swing	−0.4	

== See also ==
- List of Australian Capital Territory elections
