= Next Australian Capital Territory election =

2028 Australian Capital Territory election
- 21 October 2028

All 25 seats in the ACT Legislative Assembly 13 seats needed for a majority
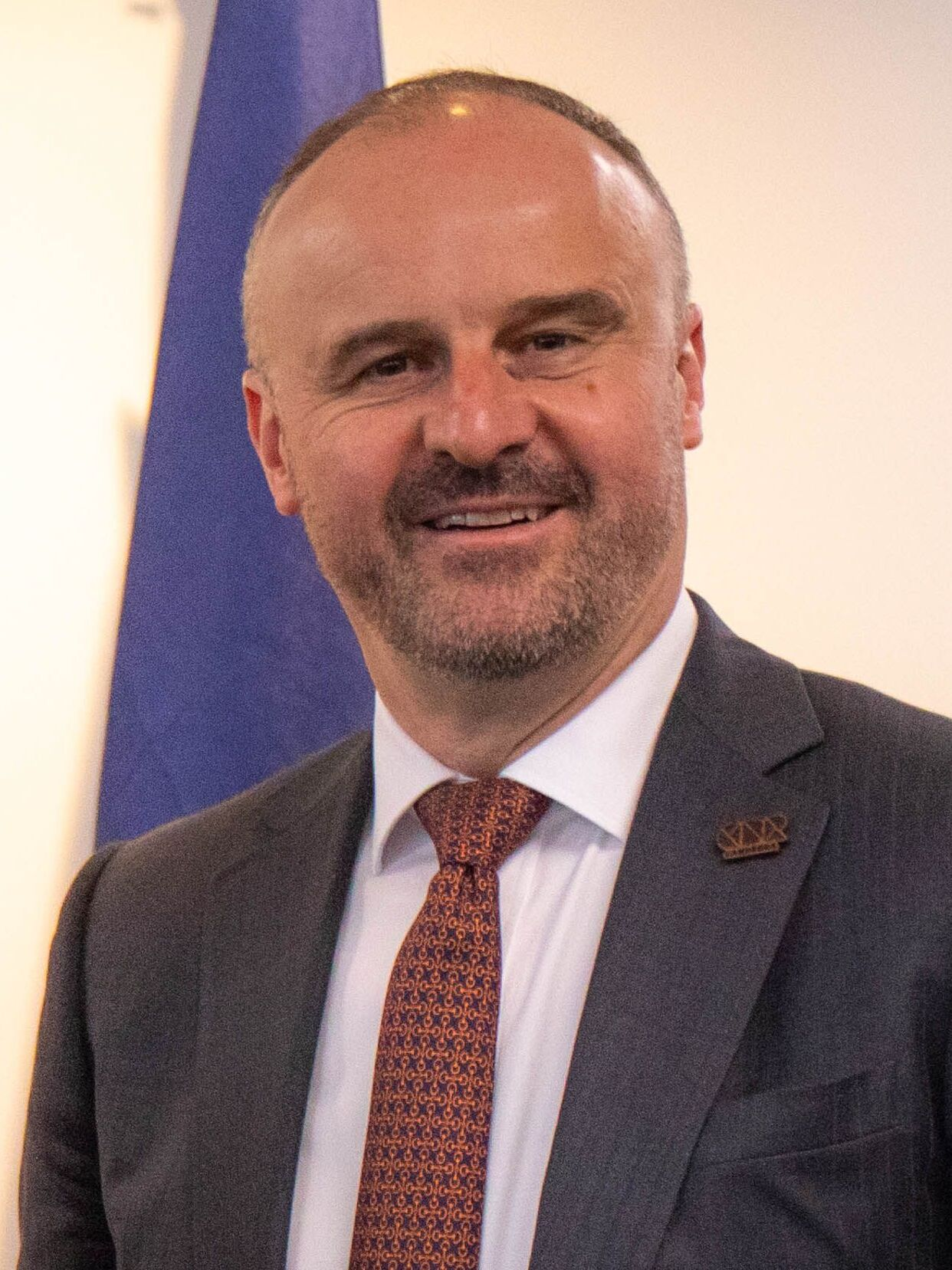

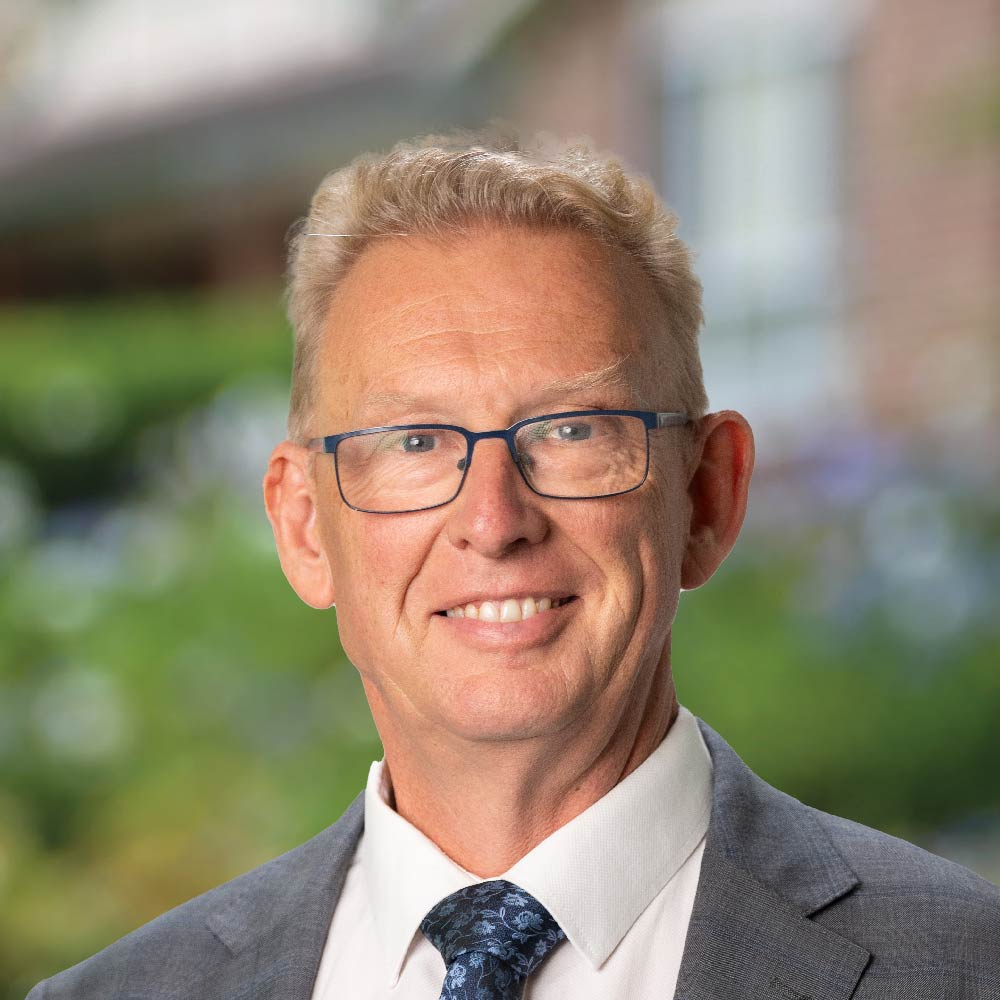

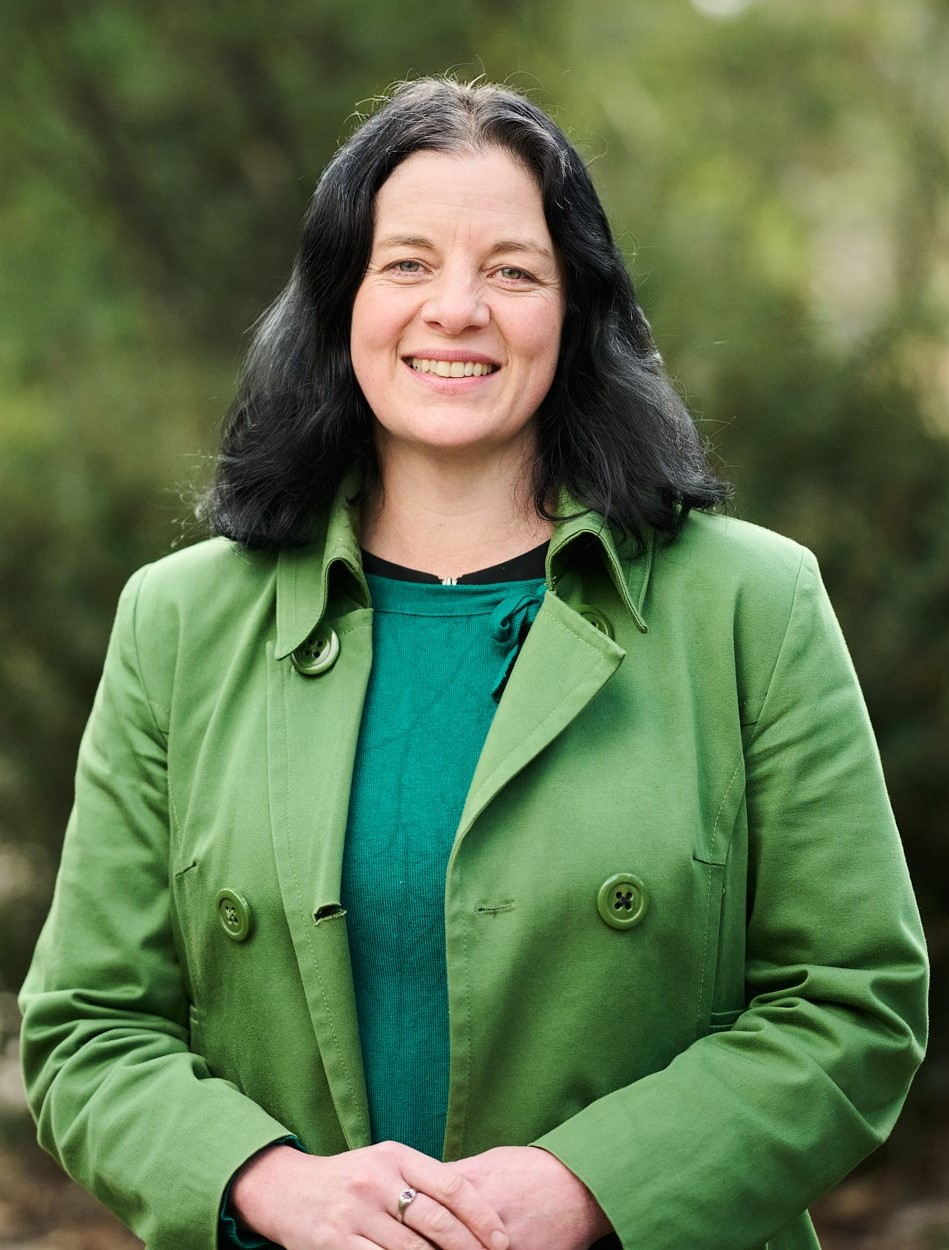

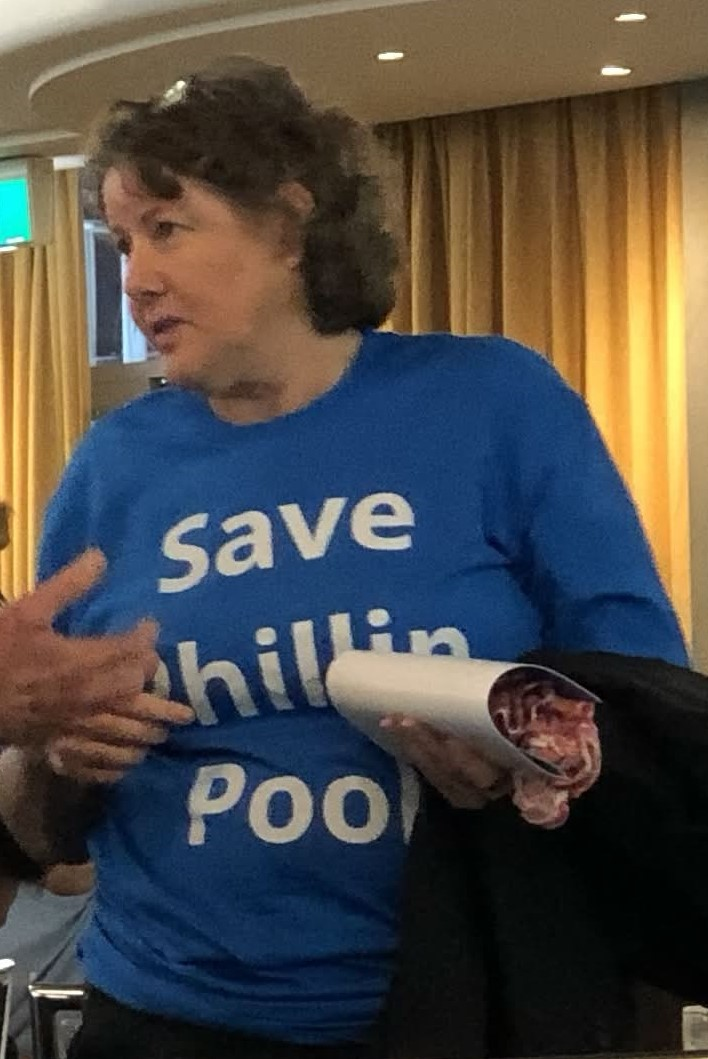
Leader	Andrew Barr	Mark Parton
Party	Labor	Liberal
Leader since	11 December 2014	10 November 2025
Leader's seat	Kurrajong	Brindabella
Last election	10 seats, 34.1%	9 seats, 33.5%
Current seats	10	8
Seats needed	▲3	▲5
Leader	Jo Clay	Fiona Carrick
Party	Greens	Fiona Carrick
Leader since	15 May 2026	7 June 2024
Leader's seat	Ginninderra	Murrumbidgee
Last election	4 seats, 12.2%	1 seat, 2.7%
Current seats	4	1
Seats needed	▲9	N/A
Incumbent Chief Minister
Andrew Barr
Labor

An election is expected to be held in the Australian Capital Territory on 21 October 2028 to elect all 25 members of the unicameral ACT Legislative Assembly.

The Labor Party, led by chief minister Andrew Barr, has been in government in the ACT since 2001 and will be seeking an eighth consecutive term in office. They are expected to be challenged by the Liberal Party, the Greens, several other minor parties and independents.

== Background ==
=== Previous election ===
Following the 2024 general election, the Labor government returned to office with a formal confidence and supply agreement with the Greens. Together the two parties combined for 14 seats in the 25-seat assembly, ten of which were held by Labor and four by the Greens. Nine seats were won by the Liberals, who were returned as the opposition, with the remaining two seats won by Thomas Emerson of the Independents for Canberra (IFC) party and Fiona Carrick, who ran under an eponymous party banner.

=== Assembly composition ===
The IFC party won 8.5% of the vote at the election and Emerson, who was elected in the Kurrajong electorate, resigned from the IFC on 5 February 2025 and sat as an independent MLA. The party was voluntarily deregistered on 10 July 2025. Despite running under the banner of a registered political party, Fiona Carrick sat as independent MLA.

On 28 October 2025, opposition and Liberal leader Leanne Castley suspended Peter Cain and Elizabeth Lee from the Liberal Party caucus, over their decision to cross the floor and vote for a longer parliamentary sitting calendar. Castley's decision quickly came under scrutiny from within the party, and on 10 November 2025 she announced her resignation as party leader, and she was subsequently replaced by Mark Parton at a leadership election. Both Lee and Cain were immediately returned to the party-room by passage of a unanimous motion.

On 20 April 2026, ACT Greens leader Shane Rattenbury announced his retirement from politics after 17 years, triggering a countback in the electorate of Kurrajong, which resulted in Greens candidate and former member of the assembly Rebecca Vassarotti being elected. Deputy leader Jo Clay was appointed interim leader pending a ballot of party members. The leadership ballot was held between 15 and 28 June 2026, and saw Clay formally elected as party leader and Andrew Braddock as deputy leader.

On 3 June 2026, former Liberal leader Leanne Castley resigned from the party and moved to the crossbench to sit as an independent. She cited experiences of "bullying, intimidation, lies, and even a threat of physical assault", which prompted her to leave the party. Mark Parton, who replaced Castley as Liberal leader in November of 2025, denied Castley's assertions of a "toxic culture" within the party.

On 23 July 2026, Deputy Chief Minister Yvette Berry resigned from the cabinet to sit as a backbencher following the handing down of a report from the territory's Integrity Commission, which found "serious corrupt conduct" of her former Chief of Staff and the director general of the Education Directorate. She was replaced as Deputy Chief Minister by Rachel Stephen-Smith and her other portfolios were distributed in a reshuffle that saw Caitlin Tough elevated to the cabinet.

== Electoral system ==
The election will be conducted by the ACT Electoral Commission (also known as Elections ACT).

All members of the Legislative Assembly are elected by the Hare-Clark system of proportional representation, with the parliament divided into five electorates, each electing five members:

- Brindabella – contains the district of Tuggeranong
- Ginninderra – contains the district of Belconnen (except the suburbs of Giralang and Kaleen)
- Kurrajong – contains the districts of Canberra Central (excluding Deakin, Forrest, Red Hill, and Yarralumla), Jerrabomberra, Kowen and Majura
- Murrumbidgee – contains the districts of the Woden Valley, Weston Creek, Molonglo Valley, and the South Canberra suburbs of Deakin, Forrest, Red Hill, and Yarralumla
- Yerrabi – contains the districts of Gungahlin, Hall and the Belconnen suburbs of Giralang and Kaleen

== Political parties ==
As of November 2025, 13 political parties are registered with Elections ACT. Additionally, One Nation has stated their intentions to contest the 2028 election. Furthermore, a currently unanmed party led by Independents for Canberra founder Clair Carnell will launch in Spring of 2026 with aims to contest the election.

- Animal Justice Party
- Australian Labor Party (ACT Branch)
- Australian Multicultural Party
- Belco Party (ACT)
- Canberra Progressives
- Democratic Labour Party (DLP)
- Family First Party (ACT)
- Fiona Carrick Independent
- Liberal Party of Australia (A.C.T. Division)
- Libertarian Party
- Sustainable Australia Party
- The ACT Greens
- The Community Action Party
- Canberra Socialists

== Opinion polling ==
=== Voting intention ===
Date	Polling firm	Client	Interview mode	Sample size	Primary vote										
Date	Polling firm	Client	Interview mode	Sample size	ALP	LIB	GRN	ONP	IND (Note: Includes IFC, FCI, SI, and Ungrouped IND)	Others					
Date	Polling firm	Client	Interview mode	Sample size	2–16 Jul 2026	DemosAU/Premier National	—N/a	Online	979	32%	21%	11%	14%	19%	3%
Date	Polling firm	Client	Interview mode	Sample size	19 Oct 2025	Election				34.1%	33.5%	12.2%	—	13%	7%

=== Preferred Chief Minister ===
Date	Polling firm	Client	Sample size	Party leaders			Lead
Date	Polling firm	Client	Sample size	Barr	Parton	Unsure	Lead
17–20 Dec	DemosAU/Premier National	—N/a	979	46%	32%	22%	14

=== Approval polling ===
==== Party leaders ====
Date	Polling firm	Client	Sample size	Barr			Parton			Clay			Carrick		
Date	Polling firm	Client	Sample size	Pos.	Neg.	Net	Pos.	Neg.	Net	Pos.	Neg.	Net	Pos.	Neg.	Net
2–16 Jul	DemosAU/Premier National	—N/a	979	33%	38%	-5	26%	26%	0	20%	29%	-9	12%	12%	0

==== Other MLAs ====
Date	Polling firm	Client	Sample size	Berry			Emerson			Castley		
Date	Polling firm	Client	Sample size	Pos.	Neg.	Net	Pos.	Neg.	Net	Pos.	Neg.	Net
2–16 Jul	DemosAU/Premier National	—N/a	979	22%	31%	-9	14%	12%	+2	10%	21%	-11
