= Results of the 2020 Australian Capital Territory election =

This is a list of Legislative Assembly results for the 2020 Australian Capital Territory election.

== Results summary ==
Australian Capital Territory election, 17 October 2020 Legislative Assembly << 2016–2024 >>
Enrolled voters	306,000				
Votes cast	273,143		Turnout	89.3%	+1.0
Informal votes	3,892		Informal	1.4%	−1.1
Summary of votes by party
Party	Primary votes	%	Swing	Seats	Change
Labor	101,826	37.8	−0.6	10	−2
Liberal	91,047	33.8	−2.9	9	−2
Greens	36,369	13.5	+3.2	6	+4
Independent	6,625	2.5	−2.0	0	±0
Progressives	5,443	2.0	+2.0	0	±0
Belco	5,264	2.0	+2.0	0	±0
Animal Justice	4,762	1.8	+0.3	0	±0
Sustainable Australia	4,593	1.7	+0.1	0	±0
Democratic Labour	3,864	1.4	+1.4	0	±0
Shooters, Fishers, Farmers	3,778	1.4	+1.4	0	±0
Climate Change Justice	1,849	0.7	+0.7	0	±0
David Pollard Independent	1,729	0.6	+0.6	0	±0
Liberal Democrats	1,209	0.4	−0.3	0	±0
Federation	710	0.3	+0.3	0	±0
Community Action	183	0.1	−0.1	0	±0
Total	269,251			25	

== Results by electorate ==
=== Brindabella ===
2020 Australian Capital Territory election: Brindabella
Party	Candidate	Votes	%	±%
Quota		9,236		
Labor	Joy Burch (elected 1)	6,459	11.7	+3.5
Labor	Mick Gentleman (elected 2)	6,395	11.5	+3.1
Labor	Taimus Werner-Gibbings	4,568	8.2	+1.6
Labor	Cathy Day	2,592	4.7	+4.7
Labor	Brendan Forde	2,546	4.6	+4.6
Liberal	Mark Parton (elected 4)	6,218	11.2	+0.6
Liberal	Nicole Lawder (elected 3)	5,866	10.6	+1.7
Liberal	Andrew Wall	4,579	8.3	−3.7
Liberal	Jane Hiatt	2,448	4.4	+4.4
Liberal	James Daniels	2,179	3.9	+3.9
Greens	Johnathan Davis (elected 5)	3,019	5.4	+4.0
Greens	Laura Nuttall	1,657	3.0	+3.0
Greens	Sue Ellerman	1,309	2.4	+2.4
Shooters, Fishers, Farmers	Greg Baynham	894	1.6	+1.6
Shooters, Fishers, Farmers	Adrian Olley	833	1.5	+1.5
Sustainable Australia	Andrew Clapham	763	1.4	+1.4
Sustainable Australia	Bruce Willett	514	0.9	+0.9
Animal Justice	Jannah Fahiz	653	1.2	+1.2
Animal Justice	Robyn Soxsmith	582	1.0	+0.0
Liberal Democrats	Matthew Knight	427	0.8	+0.8
Liberal Democrats	Jacob Gowor	318	0.6	+0.6
Federation	Jason Potter	446	0.8	+0.8
Federation	Scott Sandford	148	0.3	+0.3
Total formal votes		55,413	98.2	+1.1
Informal votes		1,005	1.8	−1.1
Turnout		56,418	90.7	+0.7
Party total votes
Labor		22,560	40.7	+7.1
Liberal		21,290	38.4	−3.4
Greens		5,985	10.8	+5.7
Shooters, Fishers, Farmers		1,727	3.1	+3.1
Sustainable Australia		1,277	2.3	+0.8
Animal Justice		1,235	2.2	−0.1
Liberal Democrats		745	1.3	−1.2
Federation		594	1.1	+1.1
Labor hold		Swing	+3.5	
Labor hold		Swing	+3.1	
Liberal hold		Swing	+0.6	
Liberal hold		Swing	+0.7	
Greens gain from Liberal		Swing	+4.0	

=== Ginninderra ===
2020 Australian Capital Territory election: Ginninderra
Party	Candidate	Votes	%	±%
Quota		9,338		
Labor	Yvette Berry (elected 1)	8,756	15.6	+5.5
Labor	Tara Cheyne (elected 3)	6,306	11.3	+3.0
Labor	Gordon Ramsay	4,783	8.5	+0.2
Labor	Sue Ducker	1,288	2.3	+2.3
Labor	Greg Lloyd	1,276	2.3	+2.3
Liberal	Elizabeth Kikkert (elected 2)	5,222	9.3	+2.6
Liberal	Peter Cain (elected 5)	3,069	5.5	+5.5
Liberal	Robert Gunning	2,822	5.0	+5.0
Liberal	Kacey Lam	2,256	4.0	+4.0
Liberal	Ignatius Rozario	1,608	2.9	−0.7
Greens	Jo Clay (elected 4)	3,495	6.2	+6.2
Greens	Katt Millner	2,242	4.0	+4.0
Greens	Tim Liersch	1,269	2.3	+2.3
Belco	Bill Stefaniak	2,214	4.0	+4.0
Belco	Chic Henry	1,517	2.7	+2.7
Belco	Alan Tutt	626	1.1	+1.1
Belco	Angela Lount	493	0.9	+0.9
Belco	Vijay Dubey	414	0.7	+0.7
Democratic Labour	Helen McClure	724	1.3	+1.3
Democratic Labour	Ian McClure	623	1.1	+1.1
Shooters, Fishers, Farmers	Matthew Ogilvie	676	1.2	+1.2
Shooters, Fishers, Farmers	Oliver Smith	614	1.1	+1.1
Sustainable Australia	Mark O'Connor	579	1.0	+1.0
Sustainable Australia	Paul Gabriel	408	0.7	+0.7
Animal Justice	Lara Drew	541	1.0	+1.0
Animal Justice	Carolyne Drew	418	0.7	+0.7
Independent	Mignonne Cullen	704	1.3	+1.3
Climate Change Justice	Jonathan Stavridis	215	0.4	+0.4
Climate Change Justice	Sok Kheng Ngep	203	0.4	+0.4
Climate Change Justice	Oksana Demetrios	200	0.4	+0.4
Liberal Democrats	Guy Jakeman	258	0.5	−0.1
Liberal Democrats	Dominic De Luca	206	0.4	+0.4
Total formal votes		56,025	98.5	+1.3
Informal votes		865	1.5	−1.3
Turnout		56,890	89.1	+0.2
Party total votes
Labor		22,409	40.0	−1.4
Liberal		14,977	26.7	−5.3
Greens		7,006	12.5	+0.8
Belco		5,264	9.4	+9.4
Democratic Labour		1,347	2.4	+2.4
Shooters, Fishers, Farmers		1,290	2.3	+2.3
Sustainable Australia		987	2.3	+2.3
Animal Justice		959	1.7	+0.8
Independent	Mignonne Cullen	704	1.3	+1.3
Climate Change Justice		618	1.1	+1.1
Liberal Democrats		464	0.8	−0.4
Labor hold		Swing	+5.5	
Labor hold		Swing	+3.0	
Liberal hold		Swing	+2.6	
Liberal hold		Swing	+5.5	
Greens gain from Labor		Swing	+6.2	

=== Kurrajong ===
2020 Australian Capital Territory election: Kurrajong
Party	Candidate	Votes	%	±%
Quota		8,434		
Labor	Andrew Barr (elected 1)	11,148	22.0	+0.7
Labor	Rachel Stephen-Smith (elected 3)	2,786	5.5	−0.2
Labor	Maddy Northam	2,172	4.3	+4.3
Labor	Jacob Ingram	1,736	3.4	+3.4
Labor	Judy Anderson	1,371	2.7	+2.7
Liberal	Elizabeth Lee (elected 4)	5,040	10.0	+0.9
Liberal	Candice Burch	3,978	7.9	+2.0
Liberal	Patrick Pentony	2,384	4.7	+4.7
Liberal	Robert Johnson	1,628	3.2	+3.2
Liberal	Rattesh Gumber	929	1.8	+1.8
Greens	Shane Rattenbury (elected 2)	6,388	12.6	−0.3
Greens	Rebecca Vassarotti (elected 5)	3,093	6.1	+2.7
Greens	Adriana Boisen	1,250	2.5	+2.5
Greens	Michael Brewer	904	1.8	+1.8
Progressives	Tim Bohm	1,173	2.3	+2.3
Progressives	Therese Faulkner	901	1.8	+1.8
Progressives	Peta Anne Bryant	472	0.9	+0.9
Sustainable Australia	Joy Angel	435	0.9	+0.9
Sustainable Australia	John Haydon	365	0.7	+0.0
Animal Justice	Julie Smith	447	0.9	+0.9
Animal Justice	Serrin Rutledge-Prior	343	0.7	+0.7
Independent	Bruce Paine	693	1.4	+1.4
Climate Change Justice	Sophia Forner	209	0.4	+0.4
Climate Change Justice	Alix O'Hara	195	0.4	+0.4
Climate Change Justice	Petar Johnson	156	0.3	+0.3
Independent	Marilena Damiano	221	0.4	+0.4
Community Action	Alvin Hopper	108	0.2	+0.2
Community Action	Robyn Williams	75	0.1	+0.1
Total formal votes		50,600	98.9	+1.0
Informal votes		577	1.1	−1.0
Turnout		51,177	86.1	+1.5
Party total votes
Labor		19,213	38.0	−0.5
Liberal		13,959	27.6	−3.4
Greens		11,635	23.0	+4.2
Progressives		2,546	5.0	+5.0
Sustainable Australia		800	1.6	+0.3
Animal Justice		790	1.6	+0.3
Independent	Bruce Paine	693	1.4	+1.4
Climate Change Justice		560	1.1	+1.1
Independent	Marilena Damiano	221	0.4	+0.4
Community Action		183	0.4	+0.4
Labor hold		Swing	+0.7	
Labor hold		Swing	–0.2	
Liberal hold		Swing	+0.9	
Greens hold		Swing	–0.3	
Greens gain from Liberal		Swing	+2.7	

=== Murrumbidgee ===
2020 Australian Capital Territory election: Murrumbidgee
Party	Candidate	Votes	%	±%
Quota		8,960		
Labor	Chris Steel (elected 2)	7,407	13.8	+4.6
Labor	Marisa Paterson (elected 4)	4,197	7.8	+7.8
Labor	Bec Cody	3,686	6.9	−1.9
Labor	Tim Dobson	2,264	4.2	+4.2
Labor	Brendan Long	1,828	3.4	−2.0
Liberal	Jeremy Hanson (elected 1)	8,209	15.3	−7.2
Liberal	Giulia Jones (elected 3)	3,535	6.6	−0.6
Liberal	Amardeep Singh	3,226	6.0	+6.0
Liberal	Ed Cocks	2,658	4.9	+4.9
Liberal	Sarah Suine	1,494	2.8	+2.8
Greens	Emma Davidson (elected 5)	3,677	6.8	+4.5
Greens	Tjanara Goreng Goreng	1,644	3.1	+3.1
Greens	Terry Baker	982	1.8	+1.8
Independent	Fiona Carrick	3,783	7.0	+7.0
Progressives	Robert Knight	837	1.6	+1.6
Progressives	Stephen Lin	614	1.1	+1.1
Animal Justice	Yana del Valle	613	1.1	+1.1
Animal Justice	Edmund Handby	464	0.9	+0.9
Sustainable Australia	Geoff Buckmaster	461	0.9	+0.9
Sustainable Australia	Jill Mail	374	0.7	+0.1
Shooters, Fishers, Farmers	Mark Gilmayer	422	0.8	+0.8
Shooters, Fishers, Farmers	Gordon Yeatman	339	0.6	+0.6
Climate Change Justice	Peter Veenstra	167	0.3	+0.3
Climate Change Justice	Jackson Hillman	146	0.3	+0.3
Climate Change Justice	Andrew Demetrios	133	0.2	+0.2
Climate Change Justice	Rohan Byrnes	121	0.2	+0.2
Climate Change Justice	Richard Forner	104	0.2	+0.2
Independent	Brendan Whyte	243	0.5	−0.1
Independent	Lee Perren-Leveridge	126	0.2	+0.2
Total formal votes		53,754	98.8	+1.2
Informal votes		641	1.2	−1.2
Turnout		54,395	90.8	+0.9
Party total votes
Labor		19,382	36.1	+1.6
Liberal		19,122	35.6	−7.2
Greens		6,303	11.7	+1.1
Independent	Fiona Carrick	3,783	7.0	+7.0
Progressives		1,451	2.7	+2.7
Animal Justice		1,077	2.0	−0.1
Sustainable Australia		835	1.6	+0.3
Shooters, Fishers, Farmers		761	1.4	+1.4
Climate Change Justice		671	1.2	+1.2
Independent	Brendan Whyte	243	0.5	−0.1
Independent	Lee Perren-Leveridge	126	0.2	+0.2
Labor hold		Swing	+4.6	
Labor hold		Swing	+7.8	
Liberal hold		Swing	–7.2	
Liberal hold		Swing	–0.6	
Greens hold		Swing	+4.5	

=== Yerrabi ===
2020 Australian Capital Territory election: Yerrabi
Party	Candidate	Votes	%	±%
Quota		8,910		
Liberal	Alistair Coe (elected 1)	8,685	16.2	+2.1
Liberal	Leanne Castley (elected 5)	4,601	8.6	+8.6
Liberal	James Milligan	3,834	7.2	−0.4
Liberal	Jacob Vadakkedathu	2,680	5.0	−1.1
Liberal	Krishna Nadimpalli	1,899	3.6	+3.6
Labor	Michael Pettersson (elected 2)	5,086	9.5	+0.1
Labor	Suzanne Orr (elected 3)	4,344	8.1	+0.8
Labor	Deepak-Raj Gupta	3,763	7.0	+1.2
Labor	Georgia Phillips	3,273	6.1	+6.1
Labor	Tom Fischer	1,796	3.4	+3.4
Greens	Andrew Braddock (elected 4)	3,431	6.4	+4.9
Greens	Mainul Haque	2,009	3.8	+3.8
Democratic Labour	Olivia Helmore	1,478	2.8	+2.8
Democratic Labour	Bernie Strang	1,039	1.9	+1.9
David Pollard Independent	David Pollard	1,410	2.6	+2.6
David Pollard Independent	Stephanie Pollard	319	0.6	+0.6
Progressives	Bethany Williams	1,128	2.1	+2.1
Progressives	Mike Stelzig	318	0.6	+0.6
Animal Justice	Francine Horne	391	0.7	+0.7
Animal Justice	Bernie Brennan	310	0.6	+0.6
Sustainable Australia	Scott Young	363	0.7	+0.7
Sustainable Australia	John Kearsley	331	0.6	+0.6
Independent	Fuxin Li	656	1.2	+1.2
Independent	Helen Cross	199	0.4	+0.4
Federation	Mohammad Munir Hussain	116	0.2	+0.2
Total formal votes		53,459	98.5	+0.9
Informal votes		804	1.5	−0.9
Turnout		54,263	89.6	+0.5
Party total votes
Liberal		21,699	40.6	+4.8
Labor		18,262	34.2	−9.8
Greens		5,440	10.2	+3.1
Democratic Labour		2,517	4.7	+4.7
David Pollard Independent		1,729	3.2	+3.2
Progressives		1,446	2.7	+2.7
Animal Justice		701	1.3	+0.4
Sustainable Australia		694	1.3	−0.1
Independent	Fuxin Li	656	1.2	+1.2
Independent	Helen Cross	199	0.4	+0.4
Federation		116	0.2	+0.2
Liberal hold		Swing	+2.1	
Liberal hold		Swing	+8.6	
Labor hold		Swing	+0.1	
Labor hold		Swing	+0.8	
Greens gain from Labor		Swing	+4.9	

== See also ==
- List of Australian Capital Territory elections
