= Electoral results for Kurrajong electorate =

This is a list of electoral results for Kurrajong electorate in ACT Legislative Assembly elections since its creation.

== Election results ==
=== Elections in the 2020s ===
==== 2024 ====
2024 Australian Capital Territory election: Kurrajong
Party	Candidate	Votes	%	±%
Quota		8,154		
Labor	Andrew Barr (elected 1)	10,337	21.1	−0.9
Labor	Rachel Stephen-Smith (elected 3)	3,500	7.2	+1.7
Labor	Marina Talevski	1,425	2.9	+2.9
Labor	Aggi Court	1,263	2.6	+2.6
Labor	Martin Greenwood	1,153	2.4	+2.4
Liberal	Elizabeth Lee (elected 2)	6,861	14.0	+4.0
Liberal	Patrick Pentony	2,219	4.5	−0.2
Liberal	Sarah Luscombe	1,143	2.3	+2.3
Liberal	Ramon Bouckaert	899	1.8	+1.8
Liberal	Efthimios Calatzis	764	1.6	+1.6
Greens	Shane Rattenbury (elected 4)	4,087	8.4	−4.2
Greens	Rebecca Vassarotti	2,296	4.7	−1.4
Greens	Isabel Mudford	1,126	2.3	+2.3
Greens	Jillian Reid	668	1.4	+1.4
Greens	James Cruz	456	0.9	+0.9
Independents for Canberra	Thomas Emerson (elected 5)	4,817	9.8	+9.8
Independents for Canberra	Sara Poguet	618	1.3	+1.3
Independents for Canberra	Ben Johnston	527	1.1	+1.1
Independents for Canberra	Sue Read	476	1.0	+1.0
Independents for Canberra	Tenzin Mayne	183	0.4	+0.4
First Nation	Paul Girrawah House	962	2.0	+2.0
First Nation	Jessika Spencer	99	0.2	+0.2
First Nation	Thaddeus Connors	89	0.2	+0.2
First Nation	Rhiannon Connors	88	0.2	+0.2
First Nation	Harrison Pike	85	0.2	+0.2
Strong Independents	Peter Strong	607	1.2	+1.2
Strong Independents	Ann Bray	524	1.1	+1.1
Animal Justice	Teresa McTaggart	342	0.7	+0.7
Animal Justice	Walter Kudrycz	302	0.6	+0.6
Family First	Jenny Hentzschel	309	0.6	+0.6
Family First	Andrew Charles Adair	299	0.6	+0.6
Independent	Marilena Damiano	238	0.5	+0.1
Democratic Labour	Belinda Haley	87	0.2	+0.2
Democratic Labour	Boston White	73	0.1	+0.1
Total formal votes		48,922	98.5	−0.4
Informal votes		750	1.5	+0.4
Turnout		49,672	82.9	−3.2
Party total votes
Labor		17,678	36.1	−1.8
Liberal		11,886	24.3	−3.3
Greens		8,633	17.6	−5.4
Independents for Canberra		6,621	13.5	+13.5
First Nation		1,323	2.7	+2.7
Strong Independents		1,131	2.3	+2.3
Animal Justice		644	1.3	−0.2
Family First		608	1.2	+1.2
Independent	Marilena Damiano	238	0.5	+0.1
Democratic Labour		160	0.3	+0.3
Labor hold		Swing	−0.9	
Labor hold		Swing	+1.7	
Liberal hold		Swing	+4.0	
Greens hold		Swing	−4.2	
Independents for Canberra gain from Greens		Swing	+9.8	

==== 2020 ====
2020 Australian Capital Territory election: Kurrajong
Party	Candidate	Votes	%	±%
Quota		8,434		
Labor	Andrew Barr (elected 1)	11,148	22.0	+0.7
Labor	Rachel Stephen-Smith (elected 3)	2,786	5.5	−0.2
Labor	Maddy Northam	2,172	4.3	+4.3
Labor	Jacob Ingram	1,736	3.4	+3.4
Labor	Judy Anderson	1,371	2.7	+2.7
Liberal	Elizabeth Lee (elected 4)	5,040	10.0	+0.9
Liberal	Candice Burch	3,978	7.9	+2.0
Liberal	Patrick Pentony	2,384	4.7	+4.7
Liberal	Robert Johnson	1,628	3.2	+3.2
Liberal	Rattesh Gumber	929	1.8	+1.8
Greens	Shane Rattenbury (elected 2)	6,388	12.6	−0.3
Greens	Rebecca Vassarotti (elected 5)	3,093	6.1	+2.7
Greens	Adriana Boisen	1,250	2.5	+2.5
Greens	Michael Brewer	904	1.8	+1.8
Progressives	Tim Bohm	1,173	2.3	+2.3
Progressives	Therese Faulkner	901	1.8	+1.8
Progressives	Peta Anne Bryant	472	0.9	+0.9
Sustainable Australia	Joy Angel	435	0.9	+0.9
Sustainable Australia	John Haydon	365	0.7	+0.0
Animal Justice	Julie Smith	447	0.9	+0.9
Animal Justice	Serrin Rutledge-Prior	343	0.7	+0.7
Independent	Bruce Paine	693	1.4	+1.4
Climate Change Justice	Sophia Forner	209	0.4	+0.4
Climate Change Justice	Alix O'Hara	195	0.4	+0.4
Climate Change Justice	Petar Johnson	156	0.3	+0.3
Independent	Marilena Damiano	221	0.4	+0.4
Community Action	Alvin Hopper	108	0.2	+0.2
Community Action	Robyn Williams	75	0.1	+0.1
Total formal votes		50,600	98.9	+1.0
Informal votes		577	1.1	−1.0
Turnout		51,177	86.1	+1.5
Party total votes
Labor		19,213	38.0	−0.5
Liberal		13,959	27.6	−3.4
Greens		11,635	23.0	+4.2
Progressives		2,546	5.0	+5.0
Sustainable Australia		800	1.6	+0.3
Animal Justice		790	1.6	+0.3
Independent	Bruce Paine	693	1.4	+1.4
Climate Change Justice		560	1.1	+1.1
Independent	Marilena Damiano	221	0.4	+0.4
Community Action		183	0.4	+0.4
Labor hold		Swing	+0.7	
Labor hold		Swing	–0.2	
Liberal hold		Swing	+0.9	
Greens hold		Swing	–0.3	
Greens gain from Liberal		Swing	+2.7	

=== Elections in the 2010s ===
==== 2016 ====
2016 Australian Capital Territory election: Kurrajong
Party	Candidate	Votes	%	±%
Quota		8,142		
Labor	Andrew Barr (elected 1)	10,398	21.3	+16.2
Labor	Rachel Stephen-Smith (elected 5)	2,782	5.7	+5.7
Labor	Josh Ceramidas	2,249	4.6	+4.6
Labor	Leah Dwyer	1,472	3.0	+3.0
Labor	Richard Niven	1,472	3.0	+3.0
Liberal	Elizabeth Lee (elected 3)	4,429	9.1	+3.2
Liberal	Steve Doszpot (elected 4)	3,834	7.8	+2.3
Liberal	Candice Burch	2,859	5.9	+5.9
Liberal	Brooke Curtin	2,739	5.6	+5.6
Liberal	Peter McKay	1,279	2.6	+2.6
Greens	Shane Rattenbury (elected 2)	6,307	12.9	+6.1
Greens	Rebecca Vassarotti	1,685	3.4	+3.4
Greens	Jill Thomsen	1,173	2.4	+2.4
Independent	Marea Fatseas	1,597	3.3	+3.3
Liberal Democrats	Michael O'Rourke	395	0.8	+0.8
Liberal Democrats	Mark Ellis	394	0.8	+0.8
Liberal Democrats	Hugh Upton	268	0.5	+0.5
Community Voters	Richard Farmer	373	0.8	+0.8
Community Voters	Mike Hettinger	299	0.6	+0.6
Community Voters	Lucinda Spier	217	0.4	+0.4
Sustainable Australia	John Haydon	356	0.7	+0.7
Sustainable Australia	Oliver Tye	289	0.6	+0.6
Animal Justice	Jeff Isaacs	602	1.2	+1.2
Like Canberra	Chris Bucknell	210	0.4	+0.4
Like Canberra	Maryann Mussared	209	0.4	+0.4
Independent	Peter Robinson	388	0.8	+0.8
Independent	Graeme Strachan	150	0.3	+0.3
Total formal votes		48,848	97.9	
Informal votes		1,051	2.1	
Turnout		49,899	84.6	
Party total votes
Labor		18,796	38.5	−1.8
Liberal		15,140	31.0	−3.6
Greens		9,165	18.8	+3.0
Independent	Marea Fatseas	1,597	3.3	+3.3
Liberal Democrats		1,057	2.2	+0.9
Community Voters		889	1.8	+1.8
Sustainable Australia		645	1.3	+1.3
Animal Justice	Jeff Isaacs	602	1.2	+1.2
Like Canberra		419	0.9	+0.9
Independent	Peter Robinson	388	0.8	+0.8
Independent	Graeme Strachan	150	0.3	+0.3
