= Electoral results for Yerrabi electorate =

This is a list of electoral results for Yerrabi electorate in ACT Legislative Assembly elections since its creation.

== Election results ==
=== Elections in the 2020s ===
==== 2024 ====
2024 Australian Capital Territory election: Yerrabi
Party	Candidate	Votes	%	±%
Quota		9,160		
Liberal	Leanne Castley (elected 3)	6,745	12.3	+3.7
Liberal	James Milligan (elected 4)	5,681	10.3	+3.1
Liberal	John Mikita	4,032	7.3	+7.3
Liberal	Krishna Nadimpalli	2,721	5.0	+1.4
Liberal	Ralitsa Dimitrova	1,110	2.0	+2.0
Labor	Michael Pettersson (elected 1)	6,495	11.8	+2.3
Labor	Suzanne Orr (elected 2)	4,906	8.9	+0.8
Labor	Mallika Raj	2,689	4.9	+4.9
Labor	Pradeep Sornaraj	1,679	3.1	+3.1
Labor	Ravinder Sahni	1,073	2.0	+2.0
Greens	Andrew Braddock (elected 5)	3,308	6.0	−0.4
Greens	Soelily Consen-Lynch	1,853	3.4	+3.4
Greens	Alex Gias	1,232	2.2	+2.2
Independents for Canberra	David Pollard	2,769	5.0	+2.4
Independents for Canberra	Sneha KC	1,642	3.0	+3.0
Independents for Canberra	Trent Pollard	460	0.8	+0.8
Independents for Canberra	Vikram Kulkarni	449	0.8	+0.8
First Nation	Cooper Pike	969	1.8	+1.8
First Nation	Lisa Barnes	191	0.3	+0.3
First Nation	Michael Duncan	142	0.3	+0.3
First Nation	Tyson Powell	127	0.2	+0.2
First Nation	Kye Moggridge	88	0.2	+0.2
Democratic Labour	Michael Hanna	821	1.5	+1.5
Democratic Labour	Colin Jory	493	0.9	+0.9
Family First	Greg Amos	706	1.3	+1.3
Family First	Henry Kivimaki	410	0.7	+0.7
Belco	Jason Taylor	584	1.1	+1.1
Belco	Gregory Burke	304	0.6	+0.6
Independent	Fuxin Li	502	0.9	−0.3
Animal Justice	Joanne McKinley	402	0.7	+0.7
Independent	Mohammad Munir Hussain	371	0.7	+0.5
Total formal votes		54,954	98.0	−0.5
Informal votes		1,095	2.0	+0.5
Turnout		56,049	87.6	−2.0
Party total votes
Liberal		20,289	36.9	−3.7
Labor		16,842	30.6	−3.5
Greens		6,393	11.6	+1.5
Independents for Canberra		5,320	9.7	+9.7
First Nation		1,517	2.8	+2.8
Democratic Labour		1,314	2.4	−2.3
Family First		1,116	2.0	+2.0
Belco		888	1.6	+1.6
Independent	Fuxin Li	502	0.9	−0.3
Animal Justice		402	0.7	−0.6
Independent	Mohammad Munir Hussain	371	0.7	+0.5
Liberal hold		Swing	+3.7	
Liberal hold		Swing	+3.1	
Labor hold		Swing	+2.3	
Labor hold		Swing	+0.8	
Greens hold		Swing	−0.4	

==== 2020 ====
2020 Australian Capital Territory election: Yerrabi
Party	Candidate	Votes	%	±%
Quota		8,910		
Liberal	Alistair Coe (elected 1)	8,685	16.2	+2.1
Liberal	Leanne Castley (elected 5)	4,601	8.6	+8.6
Liberal	James Milligan	3,834	7.2	−0.4
Liberal	Jacob Vadakkedathu	2,680	5.0	−1.1
Liberal	Krishna Nadimpalli	1,899	3.6	+3.6
Labor	Michael Pettersson (elected 2)	5,086	9.5	+0.1
Labor	Suzanne Orr (elected 3)	4,344	8.1	+0.8
Labor	Deepak-Raj Gupta	3,763	7.0	+1.2
Labor	Georgia Phillips	3,273	6.1	+6.1
Labor	Tom Fischer	1,796	3.4	+3.4
Greens	Andrew Braddock (elected 4)	3,431	6.4	+4.9
Greens	Mainul Haque	2,009	3.8	+3.8
Democratic Labour	Olivia Helmore	1,478	2.8	+2.8
Democratic Labour	Bernie Strang	1,039	1.9	+1.9
David Pollard Independent	David Pollard	1,410	2.6	+2.6
David Pollard Independent	Stephanie Pollard	319	0.6	+0.6
Progressives	Bethany Williams	1,128	2.1	+2.1
Progressives	Mike Stelzig	318	0.6	+0.6
Animal Justice	Francine Horne	391	0.7	+0.7
Animal Justice	Bernie Brennan	310	0.6	+0.6
Sustainable Australia	Scott Young	363	0.7	+0.7
Sustainable Australia	John Kearsley	331	0.6	+0.6
Independent	Fuxin Li	656	1.2	+1.2
Independent	Helen Cross	199	0.4	+0.4
Federation	Mohammad Munir Hussain	116	0.2	+0.2
Total formal votes		53,459	98.5	+0.9
Informal votes		804	1.5	−0.9
Turnout		54,263	89.6	+0.5
Party total votes
Liberal		21,699	40.6	+4.8
Labor		18,262	34.2	−9.8
Greens		5,440	10.2	+3.1
Democratic Labour		2,517	4.7	+4.7
David Pollard Independent		1,729	3.2	+3.2
Progressives		1,446	2.7	+2.7
Animal Justice		701	1.3	+0.4
Sustainable Australia		694	1.3	−0.1
Independent	Fuxin Li	656	1.2	+1.2
Independent	Helen Cross	199	0.4	+0.4
Federation		116	0.2	+0.2
Liberal hold		Swing	+2.1	
Liberal hold		Swing	+8.6	
Labor hold		Swing	+0.1	
Labor hold		Swing	+0.8	
Greens gain from Labor		Swing	+4.9	

=== Elections in the 2010s ===
==== 2016 ====
2016 Australian Capital Territory election: Yerrabi
Party	Candidate	Votes	%	±%
Quota		8,543		
Labor	Meegan Fitzharris (elected 1)	7,790	15.2	+11.4
Labor	Michael Pettersson (elected 3)	4,817	9.4	+9.4
Labor	Suzanne Orr (elected 4)	3,726	7.3	+7.3
Labor	Jayson Hinder	3,206	6.3	+3.8
Labor	Deepak-Raj Gupta	2,973	5.8	+5.8
Liberal	Alistair Coe (elected 2)	7,259	14.2	+4.5
Liberal	James Milligan (elected 5)	3,872	7.6	+3.8
Liberal	Jacob Vadakkedathu	3,146	6.1	+3.7
Liberal	Amanda Lynch	2,658	5.2	+5.2
Liberal	Justin States	1,431	2.8	+2.8
Greens	Veronica Wensing	2,332	4.5	+4.5
Greens	Andrew Braddock	747	1.5	+1.5
Greens	Tobias Holm	555	1.1	+1.1
Sex Party	Andrew Dewson	1,055	2.1	+2.1
Sex Party	Susie Kennett	979	1.9	+1.9
Liberal Democrats	Dave Green	766	1.5	+1.5
Liberal Democrats	Declan Keating	630	1.2	+1.2
Independent	David Pollard	1,211	2.4	+2.4
Sustainable Australia	Violet Sheridan	470	0.9	+0.9
Sustainable Australia	Paul Gabriel	262	0.5	+0.5
Like Canberra	Tim Bohm	409	0.8	+0.8
Like Canberra	Casey Heffernan	246	0.5	+0.5
Animal Justice	Mandy Cottingham	458	0.9	+0.9
	Daniel Evans	255	0.5	+0.5
Total formal votes		51,253	97.6	
Informal votes		1,244	2.4	
Turnout		52,497	89.1	
Party total votes
Labor		22,512	43.9	+5.2
Liberal		18,366	35.8	−3.1
Greens		3,634	7.1	−2.3
Sex Party		2,034	4.0	+4.0
Liberal Democrats		1,396	2.7	+1.0
Independent	David Pollard	1,211	2.4	+2.4
Sustainable Australia		732	1.4	+1.4
Like Canberra		655	1.3	+1.3
Animal Justice	Mandy Cottingham	458	0.9	+0.9
	Daniel Evans	255	0.5	+0.5
