= List of Australian Capital Territory elections =

This article provides a summary of results for elections to the Australian Capital Territory Legislative Assembly (known in short as the ACT Legislative Assembly) that is the unicameral legislature of the Australian Capital Territory (ACT).

== Creation ==
The Assembly was created by four acts of the Commonwealth Parliament in 1988, including the Australian Capital Territory (Self-Government) Act 1988. The first election was held on 4 March 1989 and the assembly first sat on 11 May that year.

== Results ==
The table below shows the total number of seats won by the major political parties at each election. The totals of the winning party or coalition are shown in bold, while other parties in government are shown in bold italic. Full details on any election are linked via the year of the election at the start of the row.

List of Australian Capital Territory elections
Election year	Government	Labor	Liberal	No Self-Government Party	Residents Rally	Abolish Self-Govt	Michael Moore Independent Group	Greens	Osbourne Independent Group	Democrats	Fiona Carrick Independent	Independents for Canberra	Independents
2024		**10**	9					4			1	1	
2020		**10**	9					**6**					
2016		**12**	11					**2**					
2012		**8**	8					**1**					
2008		**7**	6					**4**					
2004		**9**	7					1					
2001		**8**	7					1		1			
1998		6	**7**				1	1	2				
1995		6	**7**				1	2					1
1992		**8**	6			1	2						
1989		**5**	4	3	4	1							
