= Electoral results for the Division of Fenner =

Australian division election results

This is a list of electoral results for the Division of Fenner in Australian federal elections from the division's creation in 2016

== Members ==
Member	Party	Term
Andrew Leigh	Labor	2016–present

== Election results ==
=== Elections in the 2020s ===
==== 2025 ====
2025 Australian federal election: Fenner
Party	Candidate	Votes	%	±%
Liberal	Bola Olatunbosun			
Family First	Elizabeth Kikkert			
Labor	Andrew Leigh			
Greens	Dani Hunterford			
Total formal votes				
Informal votes				
Turnout				

==== 2022 ====
2022 Australian federal election: Fenner
Party	Candidate	Votes	%	±%
Labor	Andrew Leigh	44,100	48.31	+3.45
Liberal	Nathan Kuster	25,416	27.84	−6.82
Greens	Natasa Sojic	15,294	16.75	+2.33
One Nation	Lucia Grant	2,419	2.65	+2.65
United Australia	Timothy Elton	2,346	2.57	−1.50
Liberal Democrats	Guy Jakeman	1,706	1.87	+1.87
Total formal votes		91,281	97.30	+0.29
Informal votes		2,533	2.70	−0.29
Turnout		93,814	91.51	−1.50
Two-party-preferred result
Labor	Andrew Leigh	59,966	65.69	+5.13
Liberal	Nathan Kuster	31,315	34.31	−5.13
Labor hold		Swing	+5.13	

Alluvial diagram for preference flows in the seat of Fenner in the 2022 federal election. indicates at what stage the winning candidate had over 50% of the votes and was declared the winner.

=== Elections in the 2010s ===
==== 2019 ====
2019 Australian federal election: Fenner
Party	Candidate	Votes	%	±%
Labor	Andrew Leigh	38,864	44.86	−1.12
Liberal	Leanne Castley	30,025	34.66	+1.37
Greens	Andrew Braddock	12,492	14.42	+1.42
United Australia	Glen Hodgson	3,529	4.07	+4.07
Progressives	Kagiso Ratlhagane	1,723	1.99	+1.99
Total formal votes		86,633	97.01	+0.01
Informal votes		2,669	2.99	−0.01
Turnout		89,302	93.01	+1.81
Two-party-preferred result
Labor	Andrew Leigh	52,462	60.56	−1.28
Liberal	Leanne Castley	34,171	39.44	+1.28
Labor hold		Swing	−1.28	

==== 2016 ====
2016 Australian federal election: Fenner
Party	Candidate	Votes	%	±%
Labor	Andrew Leigh	56,796	45.80	+0.96
Liberal	Robert Gunning	38,930	31.39	−0.33
Greens	Carly Saeedi	18,929	15.26	+1.50
Independent	Andrew Woodman	4,707	3.80	+3.80
Bullet Train	Tim Bohm	4,660	3.76	−0.24
Total formal votes		124,022	97.18	+0.99
Informal votes		3,595	2.82	−0.99
Turnout		127,617	91.93	−0.88
Two-party-preferred result
Labor	Andrew Leigh	79,242	63.89	+1.40
Liberal	Robert Gunning	44,780	36.11	−1.40
Labor notional hold		Swing	+1.40	
