= Next elections in Australia =

Next elections in Australia may refer to:

- Next Australian federal election
- 2026 Victorian state election
- 2027 New South Wales state election
- 2028 Northern Territory general election
- 2028 Australian Capital Territory election
- 2028 Queensland state election
- Next Tasmanian state election
- 2029 Western Australian state election
- 2030 South Australian state election
