= Kurrajong electorate =

Electorate of the Australian Capital Territory

Kurrajong Australian Capital Territory—Legislative Assembly
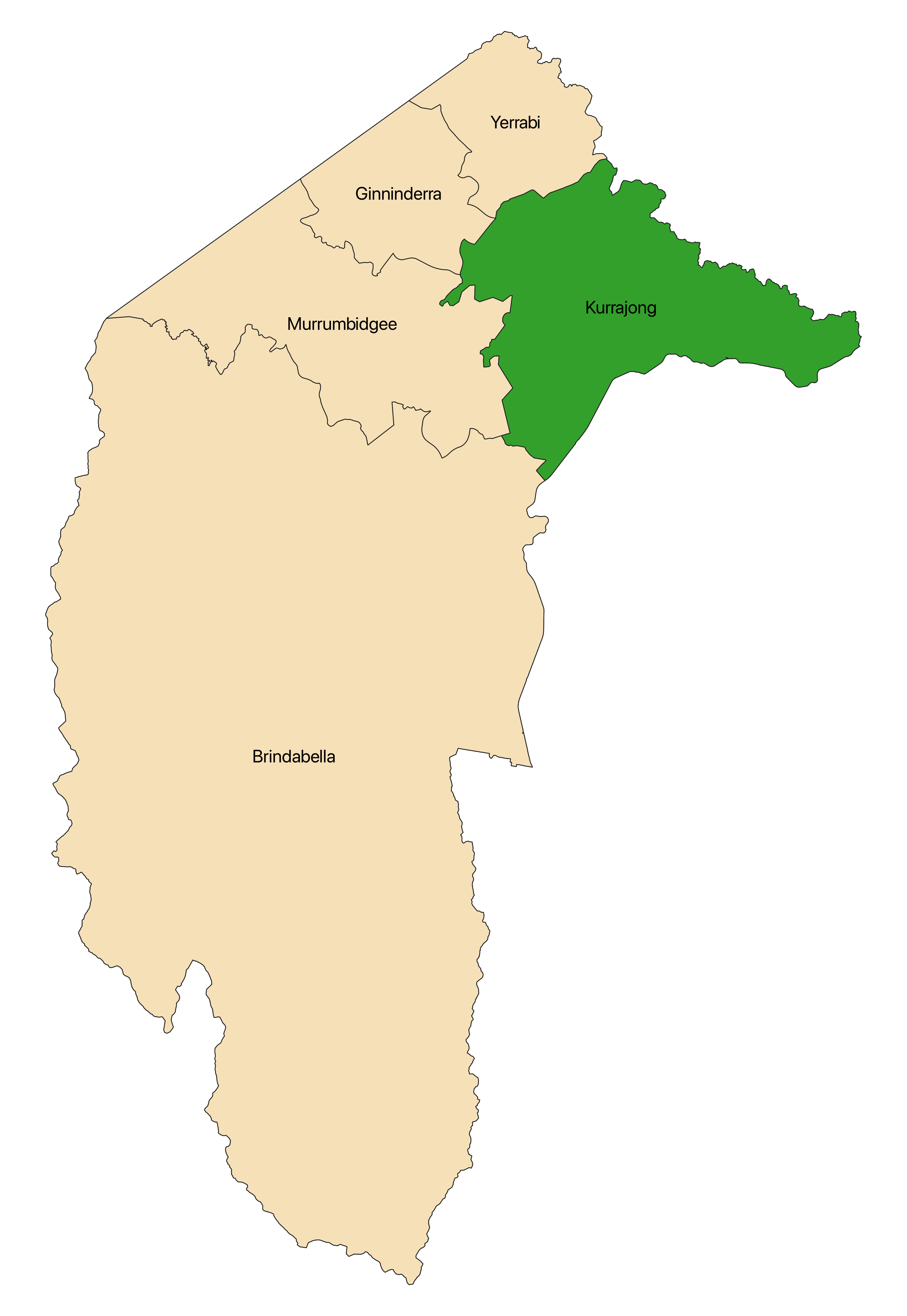
- Location of Kurrajong (dark green) in the ACT
- Territory: Australian Capital Territory
- Created: 2016
- Electors: 58,514 (2020)
- Area: 288 km^{2} (111.2 sq mi)
- Federal electorates: Bean; Canberra
- Coordinates: 35°18′0″S 149°12′43″E
Electorates around Kurrajong:
| Ginninderra | Yerrabi | Monaro (NSW) |
| Murrumbidgee | Kurrajong | Monaro (NSW) |
| Brindabella | Monaro (NSW) | Monaro (NSW) |

The Kurrajong electorate is one of the five electorates for the unicameral 25-member Australian Capital Territory Legislative Assembly. It elected five members at the 2016 ACT election.

== History ==
Kurrajong was created in 2016, when the five-electorate, 25-member Hare-Clark electoral system was first introduced for the Australian Capital Territory (ACT) Legislative Assembly, replacing the previous three-electorate, 17-member system. The name "Kurrajong" is derived from an Aboriginal word for the tree Brachychiton populneus (meaning "shade tree"), and also Kurrajong Hill, the name early settlers used for Capital Hill, the location of Parliament House.

== Location ==
The Kurrajong electorate currently comprises the majority of the district of Canberra Central, including the suburbs of Acton, Ainslie, Barton, Braddon, Campbell, Civic, Dickson, Downer, Griffith, Hackett, Kingston, Lyneham, Narrabundah, O'Connor, Reid, Turner, Watson, and the entirety of the Jerrabomberra, Kowen and Majura districts including the suburbs of Beard, Hume, Oaks Estate, Pialligo and Symonston.

On the original boundaries contested in 2016 Kurrajong additionally included the suburbs of Deakin and Yarralumla. However the boundary redistribution conducted in 2019 transferred both these suburbs to the Murrumbidgee electorate. In 2023, a further boundary redistribution also transferred the suburbs of Forrest and Red Hill to the Murrumbidgee electorate.

== Members ==
| Year | Member | Party | Member | Party | Member | Party | Member | Party | Member | Party |
|---|---|---|---|---|---|---|---|---|---|---|
| 2016 | Andrew Barr | Labor | Rachel Stephen-Smith | Labor | Shane Rattenbury | Greens | Steve Doszpot | Liberal | Elizabeth Lee | Liberal |
| 2017^{1} | Andrew Barr | Labor | Rachel Stephen-Smith | Labor | Shane Rattenbury | Greens | Candice Burch | Liberal | Elizabeth Lee | Liberal |
| 2020 | Andrew Barr | Labor | Rachel Stephen-Smith | Labor | Shane Rattenbury | Greens | Rebecca Vassarotti | Greens | Elizabeth Lee | Liberal |
| 2024 | Andrew Barr | Labor | Rachel Stephen-Smith | Labor | Shane Rattenbury | Greens | Thomas Emerson | Independents for Canberra | Elizabeth Lee | Liberal |
| 2025 | Andrew Barr | Labor | Rachel Stephen-Smith | Labor | Shane Rattenbury | Greens | Thomas Emerson | Independent | Elizabeth Lee | Liberal |
| 2026 | Andrew Barr | Labor | Rachel Stephen-Smith | Labor | Rebecca Vassarotti | Greens | Thomas Emerson | Independent | Elizabeth Lee | Liberal |

^{1} Steve Doszpot (Liberal) died on 25 November 2017. Candice Burch (Liberal) was elected as his replacement on a countback on 13 December 2017.

== Election results ==
2024 Australian Capital Territory election: Kurrajong
| Party | Candidate | Votes | % | ±% |
|---|---|---|---|---|
| Quota | | 8,154 | | |
| Labor | Andrew Barr (elected 1) | 10,337 | 21.1 | −0.9 |
| Labor | Rachel Stephen-Smith (elected 3) | 3,500 | 7.2 | +1.7 |
| Labor | Marina Talevski | 1,425 | 2.9 | +2.9 |
| Labor | Aggi Court | 1,263 | 2.6 | +2.6 |
| Labor | Martin Greenwood | 1,153 | 2.4 | +2.4 |
| Liberal | Elizabeth Lee (elected 2) | 6,861 | 14.0 | +4.0 |
| Liberal | Patrick Pentony | 2,219 | 4.5 | −0.2 |
| Liberal | Sarah Luscombe | 1,143 | 2.3 | +2.3 |
| Liberal | Ramon Bouckaert | 899 | 1.8 | +1.8 |
| Liberal | Efthimios Calatzis | 764 | 1.6 | +1.6 |
| Greens | Shane Rattenbury (elected 4) | 4,087 | 8.4 | −4.2 |
| Greens | Rebecca Vassarotti | 2,296 | 4.7 | −1.4 |
| Greens | Isabel Mudford | 1,126 | 2.3 | +2.3 |
| Greens | Jillian Reid | 668 | 1.4 | +1.4 |
| Greens | James Cruz | 456 | 0.9 | +0.9 |
| Independents for Canberra | Thomas Emerson (elected 5) | 4,817 | 9.8 | +9.8 |
| Independents for Canberra | Sara Poguet | 618 | 1.3 | +1.3 |
| Independents for Canberra | Ben Johnston | 527 | 1.1 | +1.1 |
| Independents for Canberra | Sue Read | 476 | 1.0 | +1.0 |
| Independents for Canberra | Tenzin Mayne | 183 | 0.4 | +0.4 |
| First Nation | Paul Girrawah House | 962 | 2.0 | +2.0 |
| First Nation | Jessika Spencer | 99 | 0.2 | +0.2 |
| First Nation | Thaddeus Connors | 89 | 0.2 | +0.2 |
| First Nation | Rhiannon Connors | 88 | 0.2 | +0.2 |
| First Nation | Harrison Pike | 85 | 0.2 | +0.2 |
| Strong Independents | Peter Strong | 607 | 1.2 | +1.2 |
| Strong Independents | Ann Bray | 524 | 1.1 | +1.1 |
| Animal Justice | Teresa McTaggart | 342 | 0.7 | +0.7 |
| Animal Justice | Walter Kudrycz | 302 | 0.6 | +0.6 |
| Family First | Jenny Hentzschel | 309 | 0.6 | +0.6 |
| Family First | Andrew Charles Adair | 299 | 0.6 | +0.6 |
| Independent | Marilena Damiano | 238 | 0.5 | +0.1 |
| Democratic Labour | Belinda Haley | 87 | 0.2 | +0.2 |
| Democratic Labour | Boston White | 73 | 0.1 | +0.1 |
| Total formal votes | | 48,922 | 98.5 | −0.4 |
| Informal votes | | 750 | 1.5 | +0.4 |
| Turnout | | 49,672 | 82.9 | −3.2 |
Party total votes
| Labor | | 17,678 | 36.1 | −1.8 |
| Liberal | | 11,886 | 24.3 | −3.3 |
| Greens | | 8,633 | 17.6 | −5.4 |
| Independents for Canberra | | 6,621 | 13.5 | +13.5 |
| First Nation | | 1,323 | 2.7 | +2.7 |
| Strong Independents | | 1,131 | 2.3 | +2.3 |
| Animal Justice | | 644 | 1.3 | −0.2 |
| Family First | | 608 | 1.2 | +1.2 |
| Independent | Marilena Damiano | 238 | 0.5 | +0.1 |
| Democratic Labour | | 160 | 0.3 | +0.3 |
| Labor hold | | Swing | −0.9 | |
| Labor hold | | Swing | +1.7 | |
| Liberal hold | | Swing | +4.0 | |
| Greens hold | | Swing | −4.2 | |
| Independents for Canberra gain from Greens | | Swing | +9.8 | |

== See also ==
- Australian Capital Territory Electoral Commission
- Australian Capital Territory Legislative Assembly
