= Workbook =

Textbook with fill-in forms for practice problems

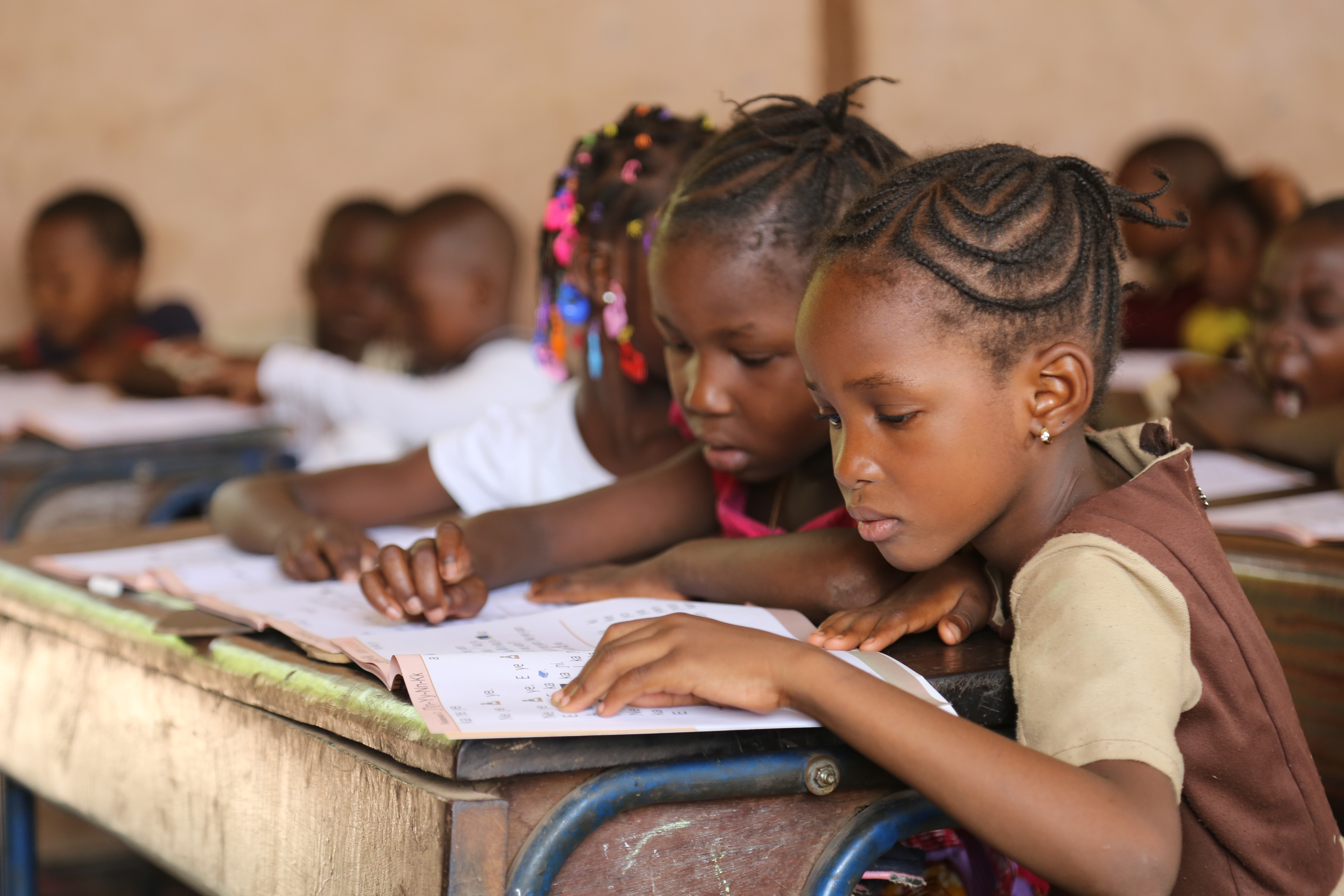
Two girls in Mali use workbooks during their reading class.

Workbooks are paperback textbooks issued to students. Workbooks are usually filled with practice problems, with empty space so that the answers can be written directly in the book.

More recently, electronic workbooks have permitted interactive and customized learning. Such workbooks may be used on computers, laptops, PDAs, and may be web-based.

== Uses ==
A workbook usually covers important concepts and tasks related to syllabus. Workbooks are used for solving extra problems and concepts which students have already studied from textbook.

Workbooks are often used in schools for younger students, either in middle school or elementary school.

The term workbook is also used to describe other compilations of questions that require the reader to complete scratch-work when dealing with higher-level mathematics. In industry, they may be customized interactive manuals which are used to help provide structure to an otherwise complex problem. The workbook format can also be used as a training tool for certain job positions.

== Advantages ==
They are favored because students can work directly in their books, eliminating the need for looseleaf and copying questions from a textbook.

Workbooks also hold an advantage because they are usually smaller and lighter than textbooks, which equates to less trouble when students bring the workbooks home to complete their homework.

== See also ==
- Copybook (education)
- Worksheet
