= Laura Nuttall =

Australian politician

Laura Nuttall MLA
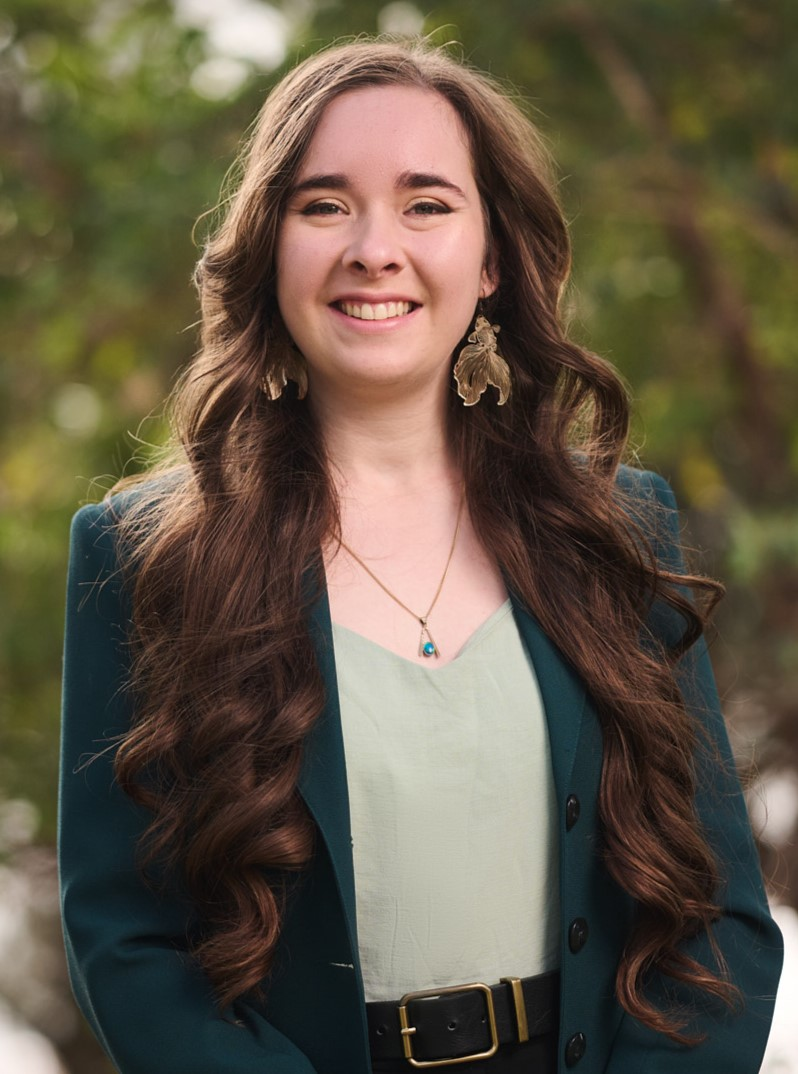
- Nuttall in 2024

ACT Greens Whip
- Incumbent
- Assumed office 7 November 2024
- Leader: Shane Rattenbury; Jo Clay
- Preceded by: Andrew Braddock

Member of the Australian Capital Territory Legislative Assembly for Brindabella
- Incumbent
- Assumed office 27 November 2023
- Preceded by: Johnathan Davis

Personal details
- Born: 3 November 1999 (age 26)
- Party: ACT Greens
- Committees: Social Policy (since 2024); Administration and Procedure (since 2024)
- Portfolio: Education, Skills & Training; Young People; Air & Water; Food & Agriculture; Women; Disability; Sports & Recreation; LGBTIQA+ Affairs

Laura Emily Nuttall (born 3 November 1999) is an Australian politician, currently serving as a member for Brindabella and ACT Greens party Whip in the Australian Capital Territory Legislative Assembly.

She (Note: Nuttall uses both she/her and they/them pronouns. This article uses she/her pronouns for consistency.) was elected via a countback in 2023 to replaced Johnathan Davis, who resigned from the Legislative Assembly on 12 November 2023 following sexual misconduct allegations.

== Political career ==
Nuttall is the first Gen Z member to serve in the ACT parliament, as well as the youngest Australian Greens representative elected to any parliament.

Nuttall has served as the spokesperson for eight portfolios since 19 November 2024. These are Young People, Water, Food and Agriculture, Women, Disability, Sports and Recreation, LGBTQIA+ Affairs, and Education, Skills and Training.

Since 3 December 2024, Nuttall has served as a member of the Standing Committee on Social Policy alongside Thomas Emerson (Chair), Chiaka Barry (Deputy Chair), Caitlin Tough, and formerly Jeremy Hanson. She has also serves on the Standing Committee on Administration and Procedure in her capacity as ACT Greens party whip alongside the Speaker (Chair), the Government Whip, and the Opposition Whip.

In June 2025 Nuttall began doing regular streams on Twitch, similarly to Tasmanian Senator Nick McKim.

== Personal life ==
Nuttall is a queer woman. She uses she/her and they/them pronouns.
