= 2024 Australian Capital Territory election =

- 19 October 2024

All 25 seats in the Australian Capital Territory Legislative Assembly 13 seats needed for a majority
- Turnout: 86.8% (▼2.5 pp)
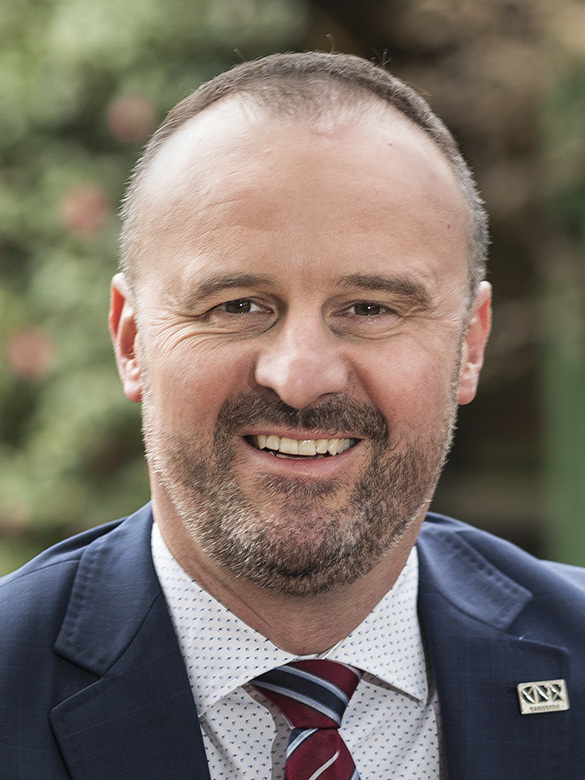

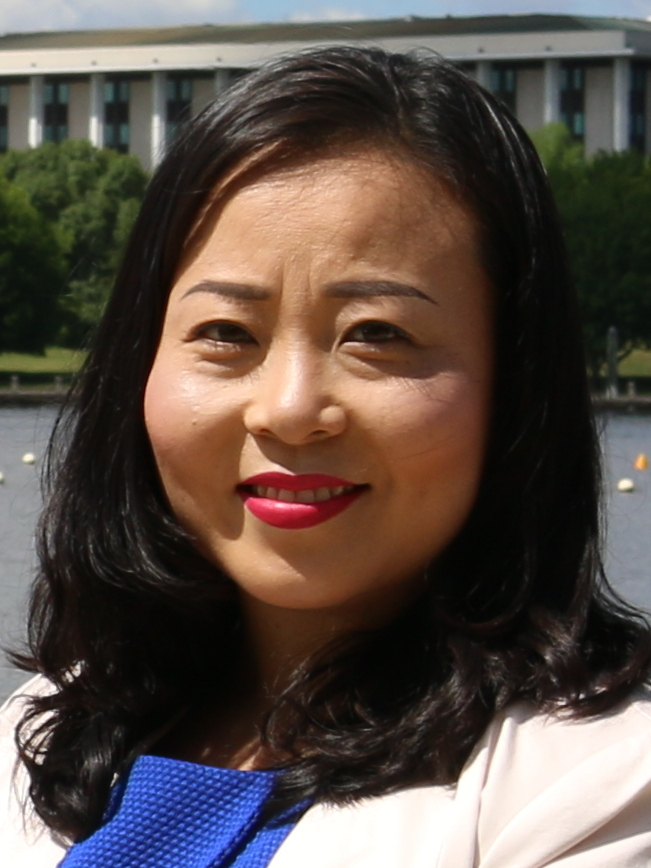

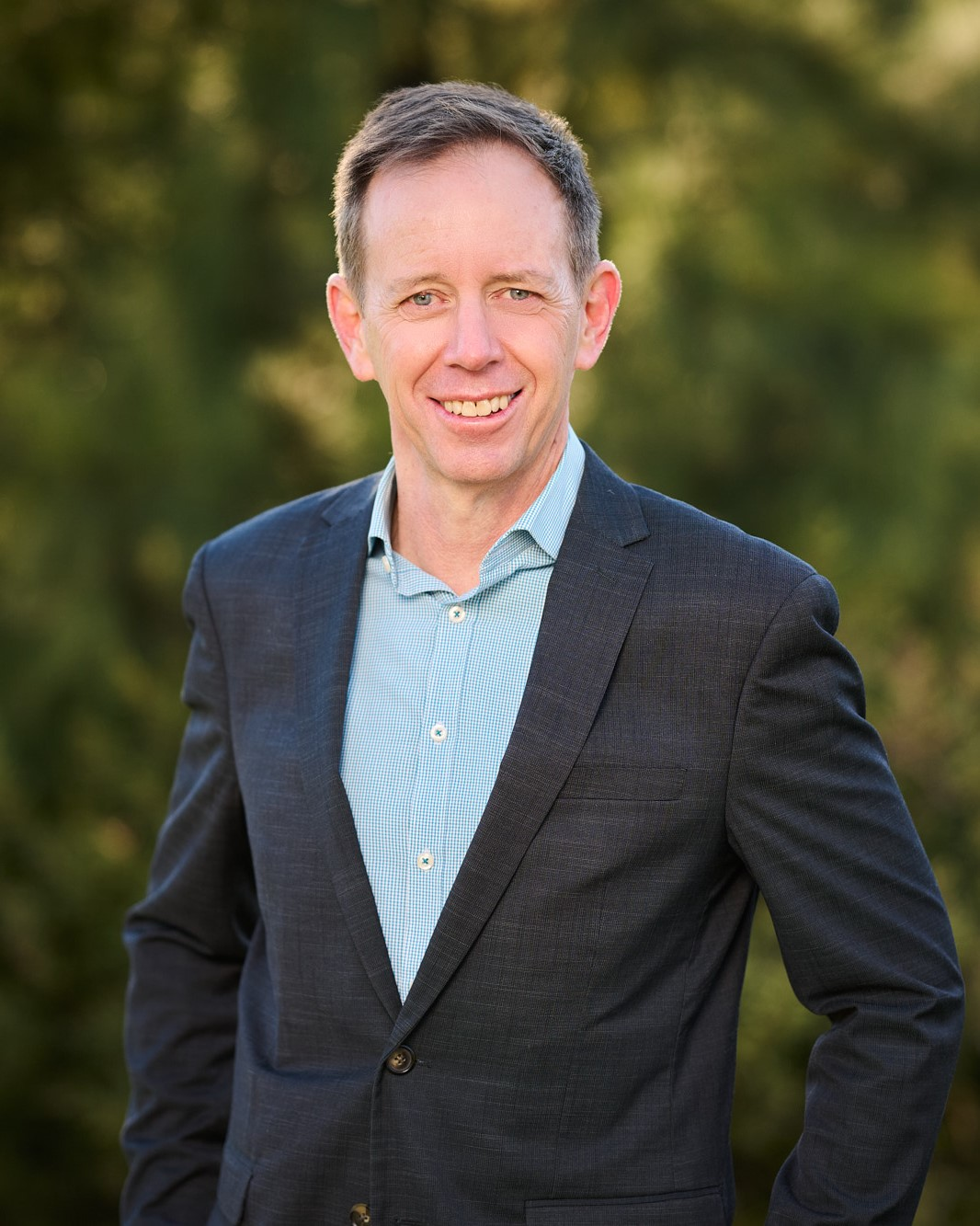

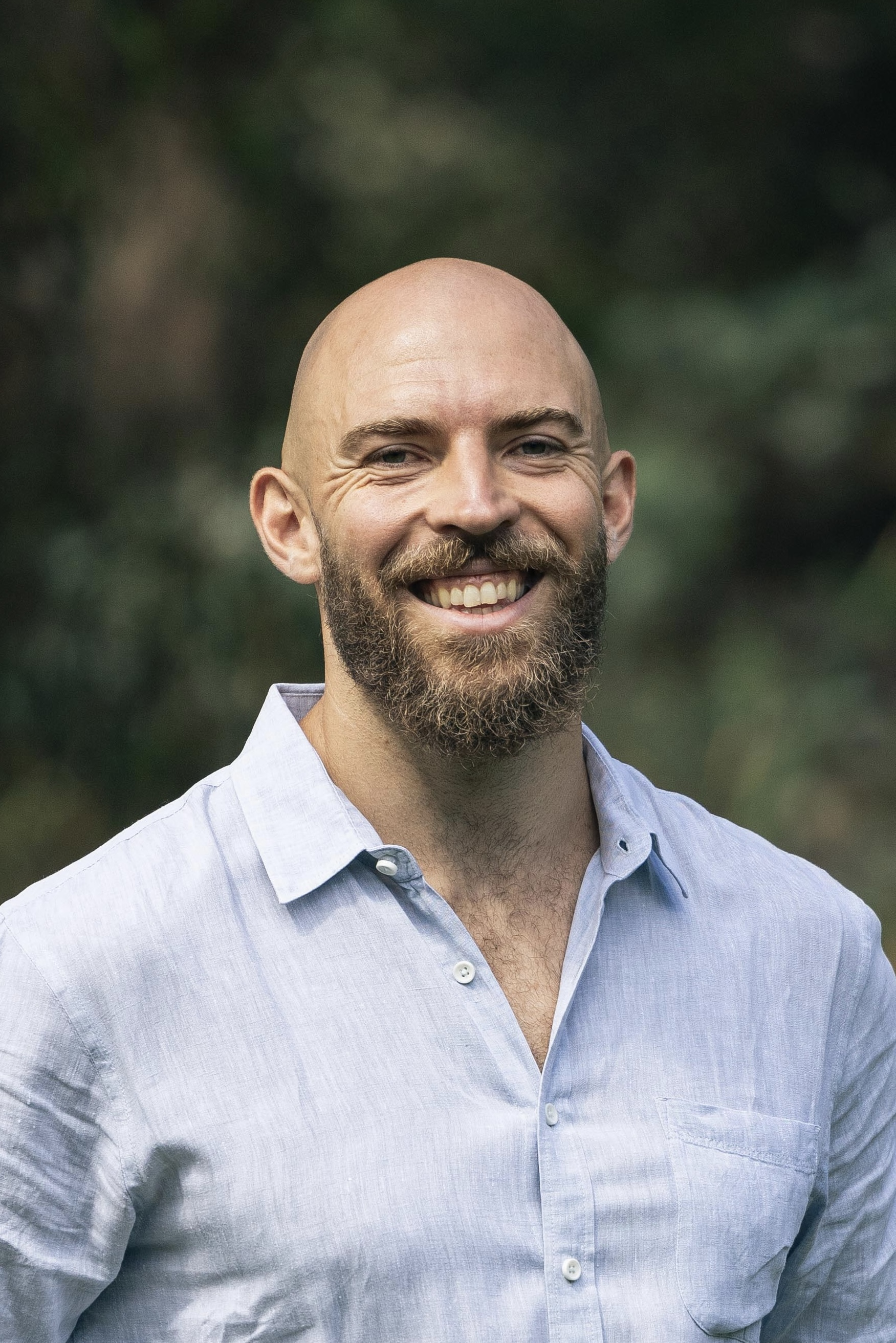

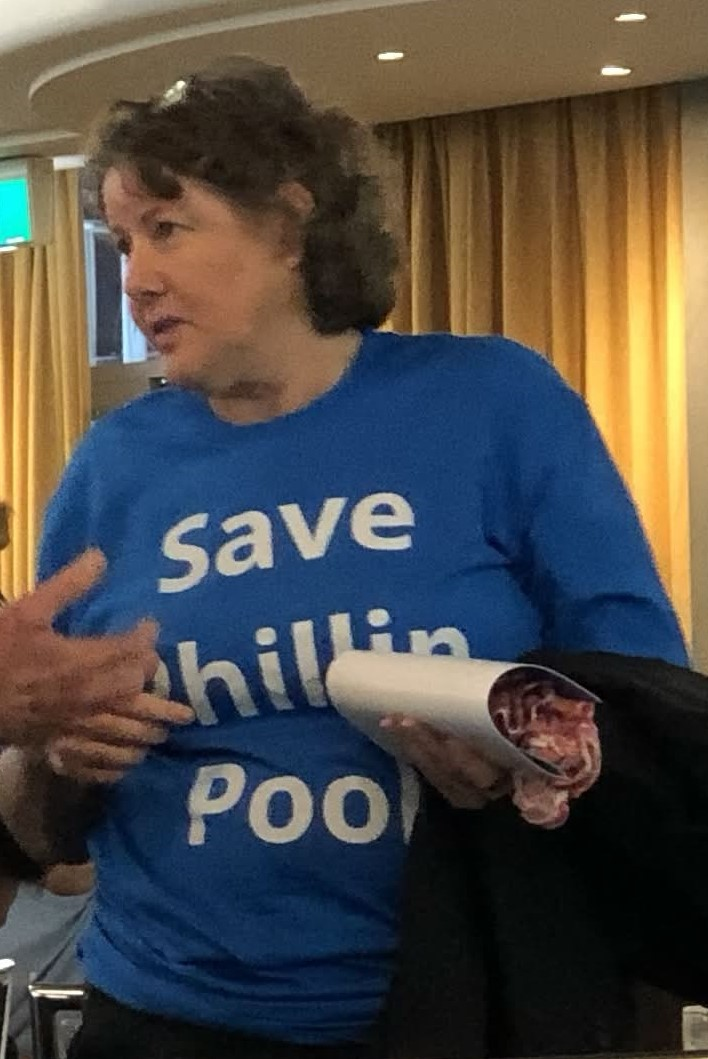
	First party	Second party	Third party
Leader	Andrew Barr	Elizabeth Lee	Shane Rattenbury
Party	Labor	Liberal	Greens
Leader since	11 December 2014	27 October 2020	20 October 2012
Leader's seat	Kurrajong	Kurrajong	Kurrajong
Last election	10 seats, 37.8%	9 seats, 33.8%	6 seats, 13.5%
Seats before	10	8	6
Seats won	10	9	4
Seat change	Steady	Steady	▼2
Primary vote	93,569	91,652	33,368
Percentage	34.1%	33.5%	12.2%
Swing	▼3.7	▼0.3	▼1.3
	Fourth party	Fifth party
Leader	Thomas Emerson	Fiona Carrick
Party	Independents for Canberra	Fiona Carrick Independent
Leader since	29 January 2024	7 June 2024
Leader's seat	Kurrajong (won seat)	Murrumbidgee (won seat)
Last election	Did not exist	Did not exist
Seats before	0	0
Seats won	1	1
Seat change	▲1	▲1
Primary vote	23,328	7,302
Percentage	8.5%	2.7%
Swing	▲8.5	▲2.7
- Results by electorate
Chief Minister before election
Andrew Barr
Labor–Greens Coalition
Elected Chief Minister
Andrew Barr
Labor

The 2024 Australian Capital Territory election was held on 19 October 2024 to elect all 25 members of the unicameral ACT Legislative Assembly.

The centre-left Labor Party, led by Chief Minister Andrew Barr, which had been in government in the territory since the 2001 election, and in coalition with the progressive Greens since 2012, sought to win a seventh consecutive term in office. They were challenged by the centre-right Liberal Party, led by Opposition Leader Elizabeth Lee, as well as several minor parties and independent candidates. Lee is the first Asian Australian leader of a state or territory opposition. (Note: Not including former Premier of New South Wales Gladys Berejiklian, as Armenian Australians are usually considered European Australians.)

Following several hours of vote counting, media outlets and election analysts projected Labor had won the election, having won sufficient seats to form a government with the support of the Greens and potentially other crossbenchers. Labor won 10 seats in the assembly, steady with their result in the previous election, though the party did suffer a swing against them of more than three percent.

The Liberal vote slipped by around half a point and the party retained nine seats. The Greens' vote also dropped, in this case by slightly above one percent, and ministers Rebecca Vassarotti and Emma Davidson lost their seats to reduce the party's share of seats in the chamber to four. The swings against these parties were picked up by minor parties and independents, resulting in Thomas Emerson of the Independents for Canberra party winning a seat in Kurrajong and Fiona Carrick (who ran under an eponymous party banner) winning the final seat in Murrumbidgee. This would be the first election since 2001 that a party other than Labor, Liberal or The Greens won a seat.

Unlike the previous three elections, Labor and the Greens did not enter into a coalition government in the eleventh assembly. On 6 November 2024, Greens leader Shane Rattenbury stated that negotiations between the two parties had not advanced to the stage that would necessitate a power-sharing arrangement. The two parties unveiled a confidence and supply agreement later that day, in which the Greens pledged to provide confidence and supply to a minority Labor government.

The election was conducted by Elections ACT.

== Background ==
Labor was attempting to win re-election for a seventh consecutive term (either with a majority of seats or via forming a coalition with another party) in the 25-member unicameral Legislative Assembly. The party formed a coalition government with the Greens after the last election, and together the two parties held 16 of the 25 seats in the Assembly. Elizabeth Lee replaced Alistair Coe as Liberal leader and Leader of the Opposition following the party's defeat at the 2020 election.

The composition of the assembly was unchanged until 12 November 2023, when Greens MLA Johnathan Davis resigned from the assembly and as a member of the Greens. He was replaced by Laura Nuttall after a countback was conducted.

In September 2024, Ginninderra MLA Elizabeth Kikkert was disendorsed by the Liberals over alleged breaches of the Electoral Act 1992 and allegations of bullying of party staff. On 24 September 2024, she subsequently joined the Family First Party and unsuccessfully sought re-election in the seat under her new party's banner.

== Electoral system ==
The election was conducted by the ACT Electoral Commission, also known as Elections ACT. All members of the unicameral Assembly faced re-election, with members being elected by the Hare-Clark system of proportional representation. The Assembly is divided into five electorates with five members elected from each electorate:

- Brindabella – contains the district of Tuggeranong.
- Ginninderra – contains the district of Belconnen (except the suburbs of Giralang and Kaleen).
- Kurrajong – contains the districts of Canberra Central (excluding Deakin, Forrest, Red Hill, and Yarralumla), Jerrabomberra, Kowen and Majura.
- Murrumbidgee – contains the districts of the Woden Valley, Weston Creek, Molonglo Valley, and the South Canberra suburbs of Deakin, Forrest, Red Hill, and Yarralumla.
- Yerrabi – contains the districts of Gungahlin, Hall and the Belconnen suburbs of Giralang and Kaleen.

=== Parties ===
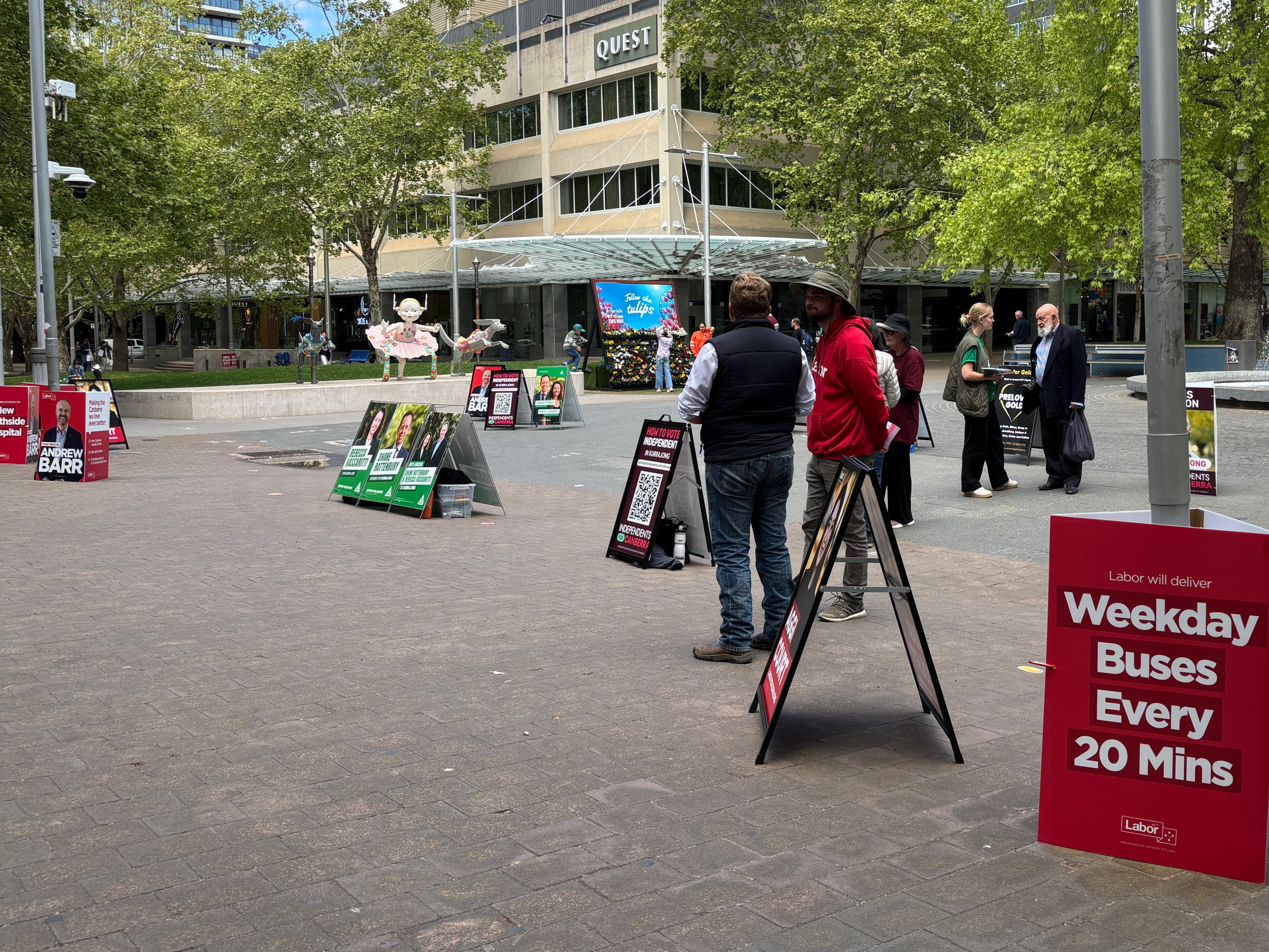
Signs and volunteers for political parties contesting the 2024 ACT general election

The list of parties registered at the time the election was called was:

- Animal Justice Party
- Australian Labor Party (ACT Branch)
- Belco Party (ACT)
- Canberra Progressives (did not run in this election)
- Democratic Labour Party (DLP)
- Family First Party (ACT)
- Fiona Carrick Independent
- First Nation Party
- Independents for Canberra
- Liberal Party of Australia (A.C.T. Division)
- Libertarian Party
- Strong Independents
- Sustainable Australia Party – Universal Basic Income (did not run in this election)
- The ACT Greens
- The Community Action Party (did not run in this election)

== Retiring members ==
=== Labor ===
- Joy Burch (Brindabella) – announced retirement on 8 August 2023

=== Liberal ===
- Nicole Lawder (Brindabella) – announced retirement on 20 October 2023

== Candidates ==
On 25 September the full list of candidates was finalised.

A record number of 149 candidates ran.

Incumbent MLAs are marked by an asterisk (*) and successful candidates are bolded.

=== Brindabella ===
Labor candidates	Liberal candidates	Greens candidates	Independents for Canberra candidates	Animal Justice candidates
Louise Crossman; Brendan Forde; Mick Gentleman*; **Caitlin Tough**; **Taimus Werner-Gibbings**	James Daniels; Rosa Harber; Sandi Mitra; **Deborah Morris***; **Mark Parton***	**Laura Nuttall***; Sam Nugent; Troy Swan	Riley Fernandes; Vanessa Picker; Elise Searson	Gareth Ballard; Robyn Soxsmith
Family First candidates	First Nations candidates	Ungrouped candidates		
Bruce Gartshore; Merle Graham	Wendy Brookman; Jack McDougall; Dylan Robb	Emmanuel Ezekiel-Hart		

=== Ginninderra ===
Labor candidates	Liberal candidates	Greens candidates	Independents for Canberra candidates	Animal Justice candidates
**Yvette Berry***; Tim Bavinton; **Tara Cheyne***; Heidi Prowse; Sean Sadimoen	**Chiaka Barry**; **Peter Cain***; Joe Prevedello; Darren Roberts	**Jo Clay***; Dani Hunterford; Tim Liersch; Adele Sinclair	Leanne Foresti; Suzanne Nucifora; Mark Richardson	Carolyn Drew; Lara Drew
Belco Party candidates	Family First candidates	Libertarian candidates	Labour DLP candidates	Ungrouped candidates
Angela Lount; Bill Stefaniak; Alan Tutt	Sunil Baby; Elizabeth Kikkert*; Andrew Wallace	Guy Jakeman; Arved Von Busch	Douglas Cooper; Helen Crowe; Rick Howard; Maxwell Spencer; John Vanderburgh	Mignonne Cullen; Janine Haskins

=== Kurrajong ===
Labor candidates	Liberal candidates	Greens candidates	Independents for Canberra candidates	Animal Justice candidates
**Andrew Barr***; Aggi Court; Martin Greenwood; **Rachel Stephen-Smith***; Marina Talevski	Ramon Bouckaert; Mick Calatzis; **Elizabeth Lee***; Sarah Luscombe; Patrick Pentony	James Cruz; Isabel Mudford; **Shane Rattenbury***; Jillian Reid; Rebecca Vassarotti*	**Thomas Emerson**; Ben Johnston; Tenzin Mayne; Sara Poguet; Sue Read	Walter Kudrycz; Teresa McTaggart
Strong Independents candidates	Family First candidates	First Nations candidates	Labour DLP candidates	Ungrouped candidates
Ann Bray; Peter Strong	Andrew Adair; Jenny Hentzschel	Rhiannon Connors; Thaddeus Connors; Paul Girrawah House; Harrison Pike; Jessika Spencer	Belinda Haley; Boston White	Marilena Damiano

=== Murrumbidgee ===
Labor candidates	Liberal candidates	Greens candidates	Independents for Canberra candidates	Animal Justice candidates
Noor El-Asadi; **Marisa Paterson***; **Chris Steel***; Nelson Tang; Anna Whitty	**Ed Cocks***; **Jeremy Hanson***; Elyse Heslehurst; Amardeep Singh; Karen Walsh	Michael Brewer; Sam Carter; Emma Davidson*; Harini Rangarajan	Kathleen Bolt; Anne-Louise Dawes; Robert Knight; Paula McGrady; Nathan Naicker	Gwenda Griffiths; Ashleigh Griffiths-Smith
Family First candidates	Fiona Carrick Independent candidates	Ungrouped candidates		
Andrew Copp; Andy Verri	**Fiona Carrick**; Marea Fatseas; Bruce Paine	Rima Diab		

=== Yerrabi ===
Labor candidates	Liberal candidates	Greens candidates	Independents for Canberra candidates	Belco Party candidates
**Suzanne Orr***; **Michael Pettersson***; Mallika Raj; Pradeep Sornaraj; Ravinder Sahni	**Leanne Castley***; Ralitsa Dimitrova; **James Milligan***; John Mikita; Krishna Nadimpalli	**Andrew Braddock***; Soelily Consen-Lynch; Alex Gias	Sneha KC; Vikram Kulkarni; David Pollard; Trent Pollard	Greg Burke; Jason Taylor
Family First candidates	First Nations candidates	Labour DLP candidates	Ungrouped candidates	
Greg Amos; Henry Kivimaki	Lisa Barnes; Michael Duncan; Kye Moggridge; Cooper Pike; Tyson Powell	Michael Hanna; Colin Joery	Fuxin Li; Mohammad Munir Hassan; Joanne McKinley (AJP)	

== Campaign ==
The election period began on 13 September, when candidate nominations opened. On 24 September, nominations closed, and the following day, the randomly allocated ballot draw was announced.

Chief Minister Andrew Barr launched the ACT Labor campaign on 13 September, alongside Prime Minister Anthony Albanese, and former Chief Minister and current federal Finance Minister Katy Gallagher. Opposition Leader Elizabeth Lee launched the Canberra Liberals' campaign on 5 October, alongside former Chief Minister Kate Carnell.

Prominent campaign issues included infrastructure (particularly proposals for a new stadium in Civic), public transport (especially light rail), and housing.

Much of the messaging of opposition candidates focused on the fact that the Labor Party have led the Government of the Australian Capital Territory for the last 23 years. If Andrew Barr wins re-election, he would become the only incumbent premier or chief minister to have won three elections, following the resignations of Daniel Andrews and Annastacia Palaszczuk in late 2023. The presence of many independents among the candidates, including but not limited to the new political grouping Independents for Canberra, was also notable.

=== Controversy ===
Certain individual candidates attracted controversy during the course of the campaign.

On 25 September, Liberal candidate Darren Roberts was accused by Labor of posting offensive content online related to the Voice to Parliament and dual naming, using a pseudonym account.

On 3 October, reports emerged that Liberal MLA Peter Cain, when he worked as a schoolteacher in 2002, wrote a workbook on Australian history that presented a Christian white savior narrative and did not mention the frontier wars.

On 10 October, Greens candidate Harini Rangajaran was found to have written a blog post about martyrdom in 2023, a creative writing exercise that made mention of idolising Osama bin Laden.

On 14 October, Greens candidate James Cruz was criticised for comments made in Facebook posts in 2014 and 2015, in which he expressed an apparent desire to "kill politicians" who enabled immigration detention, and an indifference towards the killing of Israeli soldiers.

Lastly, on 16 October, Opposition Leader Elizabeth Lee made headlines when she was filmed giving the finger to a journalist at the end of a combative press conference.

== Results ==
Party	Votes	%	+/–	Seats	+/–
Labor	93,569	34.15	▼3.67	10	0
Liberal	91,652	33.45	▼0.36	9	0
Greens	33,368	12.18	▼1.33	4	▼2
Independents for Canberra	23,328	8.51	New	1	New
Fiona Carrick Independent	7,302	2.66	New	1	New
Family First	6,643	2.42	New	0	New
Animal Justice	3,703	1.35	▼0.42	0	0
First Nation	3,586	1.31	New	0	New
Ungrouped Independents	3,540	1.29	▼1.17	0	0
Belco	3,508	1.28	▼0.68	0	0
Democratic Labour	2,283	0.83	▼0.61	0	0
Strong Independents	1,131	0.41	New	0	New
Libertarian	399	0.15	▼0.30	0	0
Total	274,012	100.00	–	25	–
Valid votes	274,012	98.10			
Invalid/blank votes	5,320	1.90			
Total votes	279,332	100.00			
Registered voters/turnout	321,721	86.82			

Seats changing hands
New MLA		Electorate	Predecessor		Ref.
Labor	Taimus Werner-Gibbings	Brindabella	Labor	Mick Gentleman	
Labor	Caitlin Tough	Brindabella	Labor	Joy Burch (retired)	
Liberal	Deborah Morris	Brindabella	Liberal	Nicole Lawder (retired)	
Liberal	Chiaka Barry	Ginninderra	Independent	Elizabeth Kikkert (Liberal-turned-independent, ran as Family First)	
IFC	Thomas Emerson	Kurrajong	Green	Rebecca Vassarotti	
FCI	Fiona Carrick	Murrumbidgee	Green	Emma Davidson	

=== Distribution of seats ===
Electorate	Seats held
Brindabella	
Ginninderra	
Kurrajong	
Murrumbidgee	
Yerrabi	

Labor
Liberal
Green
Independents for Canberra
Fiona Carrick Independent

== See also ==
- Members of the Australian Capital Territory Legislative Assembly, 2020–2024
- 2024 Pittwater state by-election (same day election)
- 2024 Hornsby state by-election (same day election)
- 2024 Epping state by-election (same day election)
