= Andrew Braddock =

Andrew Braddock may refer to:

- Andrew Braddock (priest) (born 1971), British Anglican priest
- Andrew Braddock (politician) (born 1978), Australian politician
