= Johnathan Davis (politician) =

Australian former politician (born 1991)

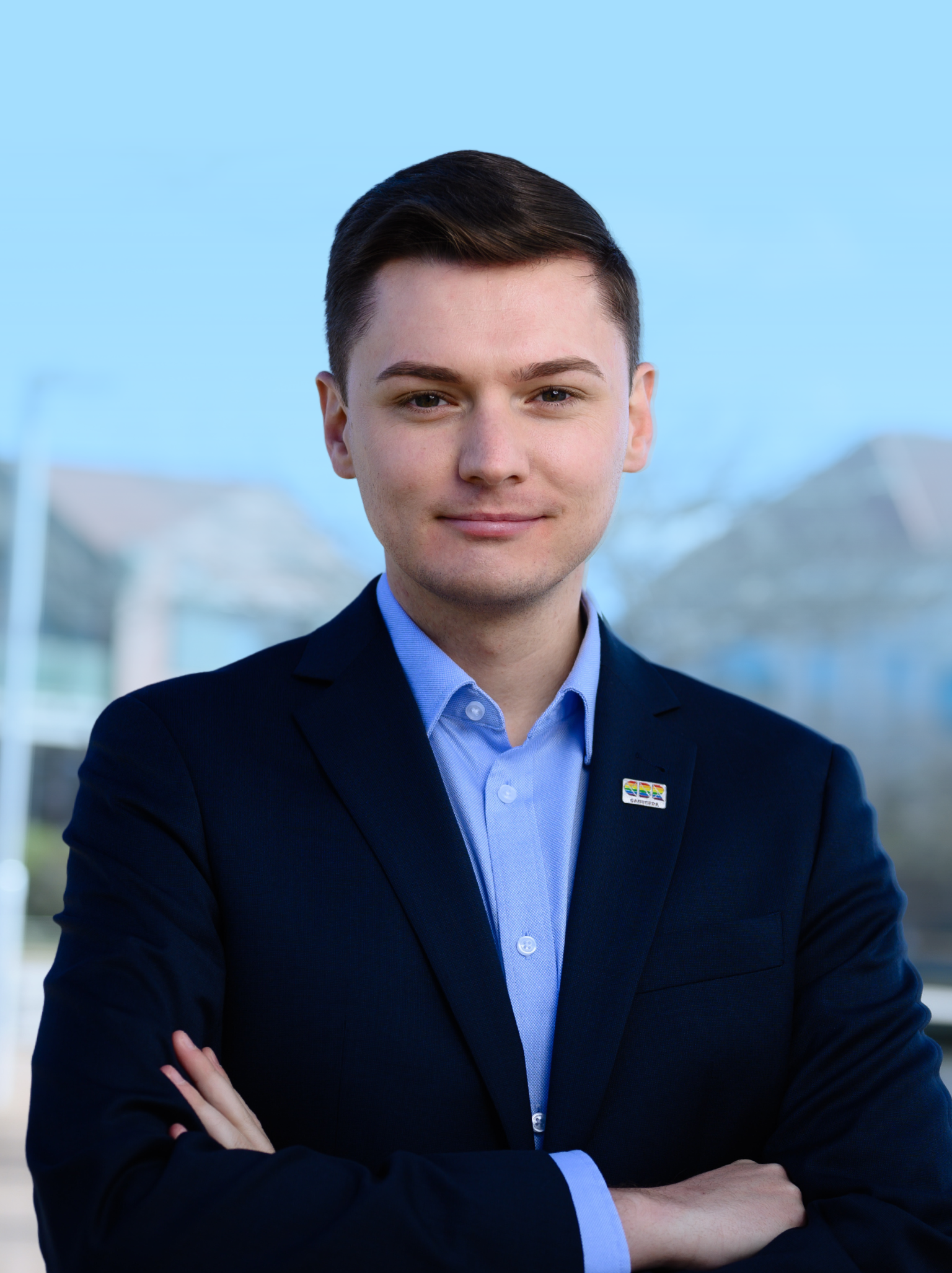
- Davis in 2023

Member of the Australian Capital Territory Legislative Assembly for Brindabella
- In office 17 October 2020 – 12 November 2023
- Preceded by: Andrew Wall
- Succeeded by: Laura Nuttall

Personal details
- Born: 28 November 1991 (age 34) Canberra, Australia
- Party: Greens (until 2023)
- Committees: Economy and Gender and Economic Equality (2020–2023); Education and Community Inclusion (2020–2023); Health and Community Wellbeing (2020–2023)

Johnathan Reginald Davis (born 1991) is an Australian former politician who served as a member for Brindabella in the Australian Capital Territory Legislative Assembly, having been elected in 2020. He resigned from parliament in 2023 after being referred to police by the ACT Greens due to allegations he had sexual relations with a teenager.

Prior to his election, Davis studied politics and policy at the University of Canberra, and worked as a real estate agent, auctioneer and entertainer. He first ran for office at the 2012 ACT election at the age of 20; he also ran in the 2016 ACT election and at the 2019 federal election for the seat of Bean.

== Political career ==
Davis first became politically active as a teenager and was involved in protests against a decision of the Labor government to close 39 public schools, including his high school. He then did work experience with Canberra Liberals members of the Legislative Assembly before joining the Greens.

During the 2020 ACT election campaign, Liberal MLA Mark Parton apologised to Davis after suggesting Davis was "too camp for Tuggeranong" and would not win election.

Until his suspension he served as the ACT Greens spokesperson for Education, Health, Drug Harm Reduction, Business & the Night Time Economy, LGBTIQA+ Affairs, Sport and Recreation, Tourism and Events, Young People and the Elimination of Family & Domestic Violence.

On 10 November 2023, Davis was stood down from his Greens spokesperson responsibilities and referred to police by the ACT Greens after allegations he had sexual relationships with a teenager.

Davis resigned from parliament and as a member of the ACT Greens on 12 November 2023.

== Personal life ==
Davis is openly gay. Outside of politics he is involved in stand-up comedy, performs as a drag queen, sings country music and previously hosted karaoke at the Canberra Irish Club.

== Electoral history ==
Year	Electorate	Party	First preference result					Result at exclusion/election				Result
Year	Electorate	Party	Votes	%	±%	Quota	Position	Votes	%	Quota	Position	Result
2012	Brindabella	ACT Greens	835	1.3	▲1.3	0.08	Sixteenth	1,142	1.8	0.11	Sixteenth	Not elected
2016	Brindabella	ACT Greens	684	1.5	▲0.2	0.09	Sixteenth	996	2.2	0.13	Twelfth	Not elected
2019	Bean (Australian federal election)	ACT Greens	12,168	13.1	▼0.6	N/A	Third	16,533	17.8	N/A	Third	Not elected
2020	Brindabella	ACT Greens	3,019	5.4	▲3.9	0.33	Seventh				Fifth	Elected
