= Strong Independents =

- Abbreviation: SI
- Leader: Peter Strong; Ann Bray
- Founded: 2024; 2 years ago
- Registered: 4 June 2024; 2 years ago
- Ideology: Localism
- Legislative Assembly: 0 / 25

Website
- www.strongindependents.com.au

Strong Independents (SI) was an Australian political party based in the Australian Capital Territory.

== History ==
Strong Independents applied for registration with Elections ACT on 15 May 2024 in order to contest the October 2024 ACT election. The party was formally registered on 4 June.

The part was deregistered on 15 November 2024 at the party's request.

== Policies ==
The party supports 12-year term limits for ACT politicians and citizen-initiated polls on policy ideas.

== See also ==
- Fiona Carrick Independent
- Independents for Canberra
