= First Nation Party =

First Nations Party
- Abbreviation: First Nation; FNP
- Leader: Paul Girrawah House
- Founders: Paul Girrawah House
- Registered: 30 July 2024; 17 months ago
- Ideology: Indigenous Australian interests Regionalism
- Legislative Assembly: 0 / 25

Website
- firstnationsparty.org.au

The First Nations Party (FNP; registered with the Australian Capital Territory Electoral Commission under the name First Nation Party) is an Australian political party based in the Australian Capital Territory, led by Paul Girrawah House.

The party applied for registration with Elections ACT on 10 July 2024 and was registered 20 days later on 30 July in order to contest the 2024 ACT election.

House, the son of elder and activist Matilda House and a prominent spokesman for the Ngambri people, was partly inspired to register a party in the Australian Capital Territory because it was the only state or territory where a majority voted "Yes" in the 2023 Australian Indigenous Voice referendum.

The party was de-registered by Elections ACT at its own request on 12 September 2025.

== See also ==
- Australia's First Nations Political Party
- Indigenous-Aboriginal Party of Australia
