= Caitlin Tough =

Australian politician

Caitlin Tough MLA
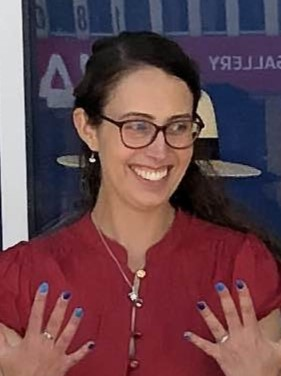
- Tough in 2025

Member of the Australian Capital Territory Legislative Assembly for Brindabella
- Incumbent
- Assumed office 19 October 2024
- Preceded by: Joy Burch

Personal details
- Born: January 1993 (age 33) Central Coast, New South Wales, Australia
- Party: Labor
- Spouse: Matthew
- Children: 1
- Occupation: Politician
- Profession: Public Servant

Caitlin Tough (nee Delbridge; born January 1993) is an Australian politician and Minister, serving as a member of the Legislative Assembly for the Australian Capital Territory, representing the electorate of Brindabella. A member of the ACT Labor Party, she was elected at the 2024 ACT election, succeeding the retiring Joy Burch.

== Early years and education ==
Tough was born on the Central Coast of New South Wales and grew up in and around Toukley, attending public primary schools in both Toukely and Wyong. She completed high school at MacKillop Catholic College, Warnervale before moving to Canberra in 2011 at the age of 18 to study at the Australian National University. She graduated with a Bachelor of Policy Studies in 2013. In 2019, Tough graduated from Macquarie University with a Master of Politics and Public Policy. While studying for her master's degree, Tough entered the Australian Public Service, where she was employed until her election in 2024. During her high school and university years, Tough worked at a local pharmacy, Kmart Australia, and briefly worked in the electorate office of Gai Brodtmann, the former Labor member for the federal electorate of Canberra. After graduating from the ANU, Tough worked as a legal assistant for a couple of years at a Canberra-based personal injury law firm.

== Political career ==
Tough joined the Australian Labor Party in 2010 while in high school and has served in various positions within the ACT Branch since 2012. Tough is a member of EMILY's List Australia.

After Joy Burch announced her plans to retire from the ACT Legislative Assembly following the 2024 ACT election, Tough sought preselection for the seat of Brindabella in Canberra’s Tuggeranong region. Tough was preselected for the multi-member electorate alongside sitting member Mick Gentleman and candidates Louise Crossman, Brendan Forde and Taimus Werner-Gibbings. At the 2024 ACT election, she was elected with a primary vote share of 10.4%, or 0.6 quotas, leading the ACT Labor ticket in the electorate and becoming the second member elected for the seat of Brindabella, a victory that was not projected by pundits such as Antony Green. She was sworn into the 11th Assembly on 6 November 2024 and the following day was appointed by the Labor Party as Government Whip.

Tough served as a member on the Standing Committee on Social Policy, the Standing Committee on Environment and Planning, the Standing Committee on Public Accounts, and was the Deputy Chair of the Standing Committee on Administration and Procedure.

Following the resignation of Yvette Berry from cabinet on 23 July 2026, Tough was appointed to cabinet as part of the new ACT Labor ministry announced 27 July 2026. Tough was given ministerial portfolios for human rights, community services, corrections, women, seniors and veterans, and prevention of domestic, family and sexual violence.

== Personal life ==
Tough moved to Canberra in 2011 and to the Tuggeranong region a few years later. She lives in the Lanyon Valley of the Tuggeranong region with her husband and their son.

Tough was diagnosed with endometriosis at the age of 24, and has gone on to become an ambassador for Endometriosis Australia. Tough is an advocate for women’s health and economic empowerment, and promotes further recognition and support for women regarding diagnoses and treatment in the health system.
