= Belco Party =

- Leader: Bill Stefaniak
- Founder: Bill Stefaniak
- Founded: 2020; 6 years ago
- Split from: Canberra Liberals
- Colours: Orange; Purple; Black
- Legislative Assembly: 0 / 25

Website
- belcoparty.org

The Belco Party is a political party registered for the 2020 Australian Capital Territory election. Founded by former Liberal Party Leader of the Opposition Bill Stefaniak, it was formally registered on 16 June 2020.

It fielded five candidates in the Ginninderra electorate at the 2020 Australian Capital Territory election.

At the 2024 Australian Capital Territory election, the party fielded a full ticket of five candidates in Ginninderra and two candidates in Yerrabi which includes the Belconnen suburbs of Giralang and Kaleen.

== Electoral results ==
Legislative Assembly
Election year	Votes	Vote %	Swing	Seats won	Change	Position	
2020	5,264	1.96	▲1.96	0 / 5 Ginninderra seats	0	(#5)	Extra-parliamentary
2024	3,508	1.28	▼0.68	0 / 25	0	(#9)	Extra-parliamentary
