= Fiona Carrick =

Australian politician

Fiona Carrick MLA
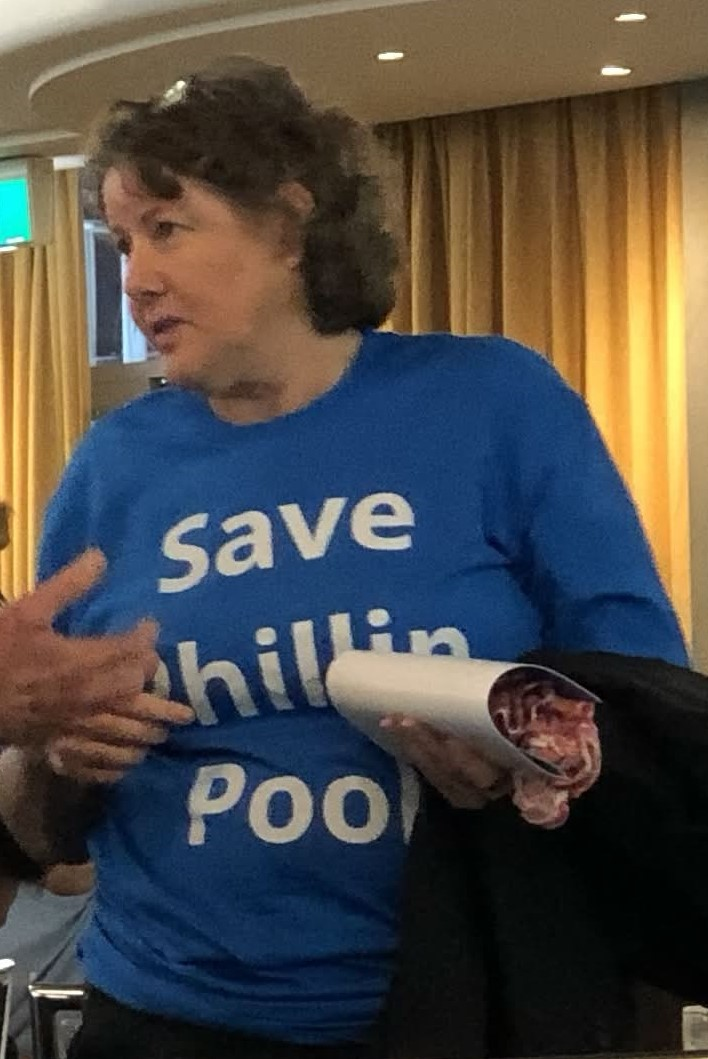
- Carrick in 2026

Member of the Australian Capital Territory Legislative Assembly for Murrumbidgee
- Incumbent
- Assumed office 19 October 2024
- Preceded by: Emma Davidson

President of the Woden Valley Community Council
- In office 2016 – 18 January 2024
- Succeeded by: Caroline Le Couteur

Personal details
- Party: Fiona Carrick Independent (since 2024)
- Website: fionacarrick.com

Fiona Carrick is an Australian politician serving as a member of the ACT Legislative Assembly for the electorate of Murrumbidgee since 2024.

== Political career ==
From 2016 to 2024, Carrick served as the president of the Woden Valley Community Council.

Carrick contested the 2020 Australian Capital Territory election, attracting the largest share of the vote for an independent candidate. She came fourth in initial preferences, but ultimately failed to be elected following preference flows.

Carrick ran again in the 2024 election, this time for the "Fiona Carrick Independent" party. She was successful, and alongside Independents for Canberra leader Thomas Emerson, became the first independents elected to the ACT Legislative Assembly in 23 years.

== Fiona Carrick Independent (political party) ==
Fiona Carrick Independent
- Abbreviation: Fiona Carrick; FCI
- Leader: Fiona Carrick
- Founded: 7 June 2024
- Registered: 25 June 2024

Carrick applied with the Australian Capital Territory Electoral Commission to register a party named "Fiona Carrick Independent" on 7 June 2024. It was officially registered on 25 June 2024.
