= Thomas Emerson (politician) =

Australian politician (born 1993)

Thomas Emerson MLA
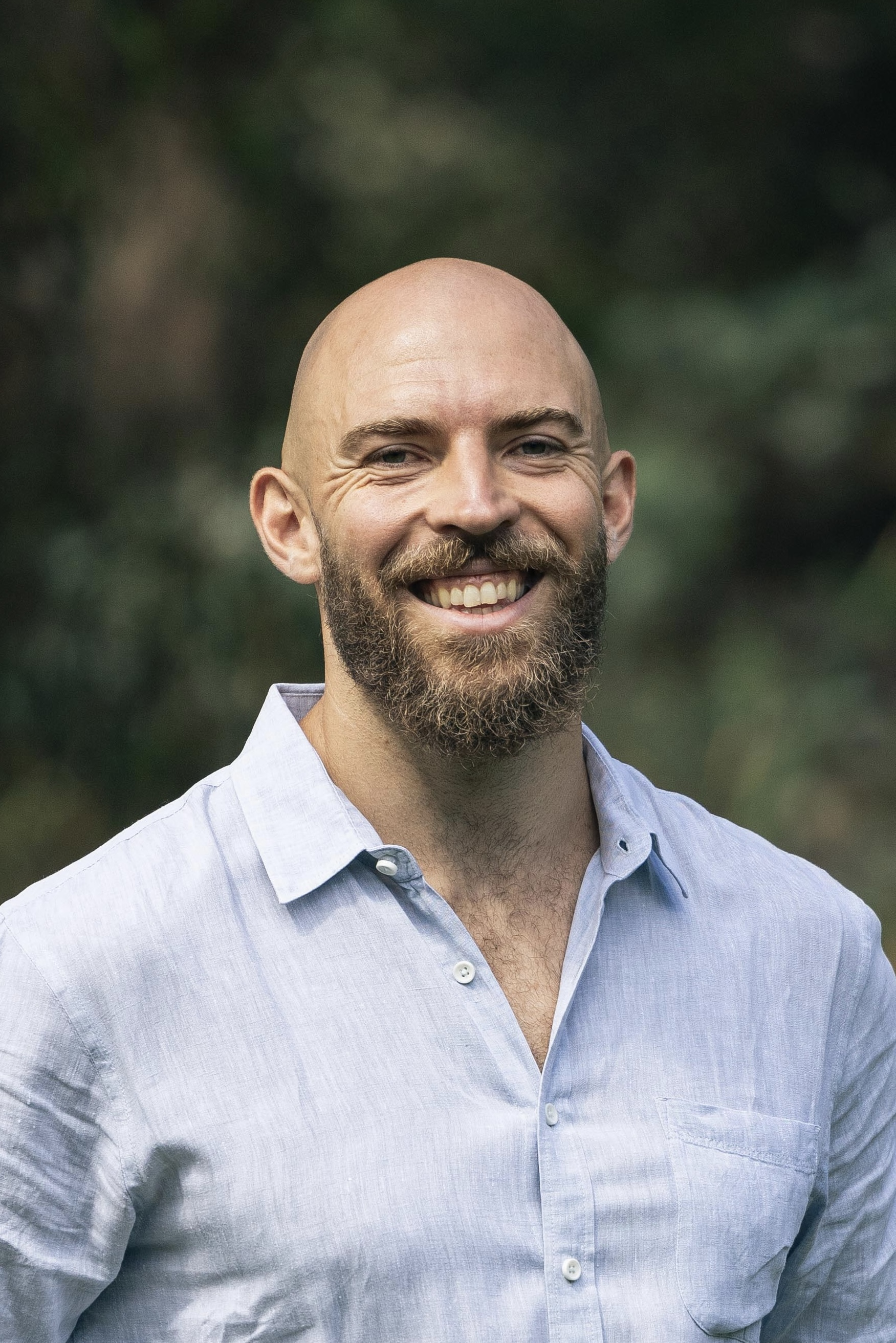

Member of the Australian Capital Territory Legislative Assembly for Kurrajong
- Incumbent
- Assumed office 19 October 2024 Serving with 4 others
- Preceded by: Rebecca Vassarotti

Leader of Independents for Canberra
- In office 29 January 2024 – 5 February 2025
- Preceded by: New party
- Succeeded by: Vacant

Personal details
- Born: 1993 (age 32–33)
- Party: Independent (2025–present); Independents for Canberra (2024−2025)
- Other political affiliations: David Pocock (2022)
- Relations: Craig Emerson (father)

Thomas Emerson (born 1993) is an Australian politician who has served as a member for the seat of Kurrajong in the Australian Capital Territory Legislative Assembly since October 2024. He previously served as the leader of Independents for Canberra (IFC), the party he co-founded, from January 2024 until resigning in February 2025.

== Early life ==
From the age of 16, Emerson spent seven years with chronic hip, lower back and shoulder problems. After graduating with a philosophy degree from the Australian National University (ANU) in 2017, he founded Praksis, a Canberra-based movement studio.

== Political career ==
During the 2022 federal election, Emerson volunteered for independent candidate David Pocock. After Pocock was successful in his election as an ACT senator, Emerson began to work for him as an advisor.

In January 2024, Emerson co-founded Independents for Canberra (IFC) ahead of the 2024 ACT election. On 31 May, IFC announced Emerson and Sara Poguet as the party's lead candidates for the electorate of Kurrajong. Emerson, along with Fiona Carrick (who contested with her own Fiona Carrick Independent party) became the first independents elected to the Australian Capital Territory Legislative Assembly in 23 years.

Emerson resigned from IFC on 5 February 2025.

== Personal life ==
Emerson's father is Craig Emerson, who served as the federal Minister for Small Business and Minister for Trade and Competitiveness in the Rudd-Gillard government.
