= Independents for Canberra =

- Abbreviation: IND for CBR; IFC; I4C
- Secretary: Leigh Cox
- Founders: Thomas Emerson; Clare Carnell
- Founded: 29 January 2024; 2 years ago
- Registered: 8 March 2024; 2 years ago
- Dissolved: 10 July 2025; 15 months ago (as a political party)
- Slogan: It's time for change.

Website
- independentsforcanberra.com

Independents for Canberra (IFC) is an Australian political organisation that supports independent politicians in the Australian Capital Territory. It was previously registered as a political party and had one seat in the Legislative Assembly, with leader Thomas Emerson serving as a member for the electorate of Kurrajong.

== History ==
=== Formation ===
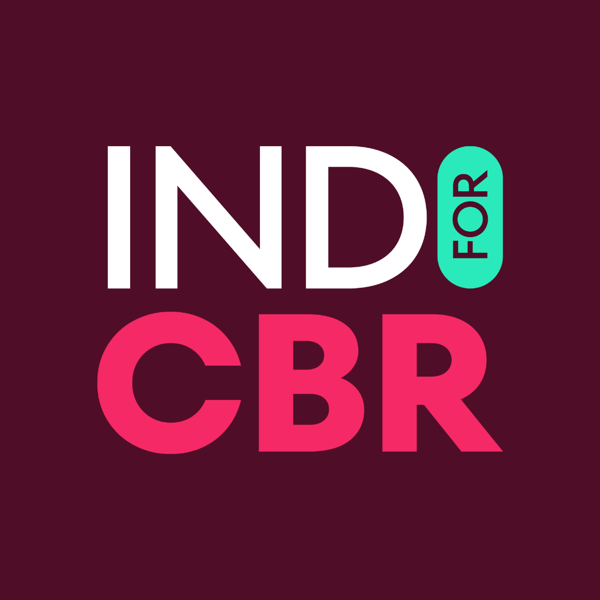
Alternate version of IFC's logo

IFC was established in January 2024 by Thomas Emerson, an advisor to independent senator David Pocock and son of former federal Labor minister Craig Emerson, and Clare Carnell, a former Liberal Party member and the daughter of former Chief Minister Kate Carnell. However, Carnell resigned as co-leader on 14 May 2024 due to poor health.

On 8 March 2024, the party was officially registered with Elections ACT, in time for the 2024 ACT election.

=== 2024 election ===
ACT Policing acting inspector Mark Richardson was announced as IFC's first lead candidate on 18 May, contesting the electorate of Ginninderra. Later that month, Emerson and Sara Poguet were announced as the party's lead candidates for Kurrajong.

David Pollard, who unsuccessfully contested the 2016 and 2020 elections (the latter with his own party known as "David Pollard Independent"), joined IFC as one of two lead candidates in Yerrabi.

In August, Brindabella IFC candidate Vanessa Picker said she would not support Andrew Barr remaining as chief minister. The Labor Party subsequently ran an advertisement that claimed voting for IFC or other minor parties could lead to the Liberals forming government. Emerson later announced that none of IFC's candidates would form part of any coalition government, and would instead sit on the crossbench.

=== Deregistration ===
On 5 February 2025, Emerson resigned from Independents for Canberra. The party was subsequently voluntarily deregistered on 10 July 2025.

== Criticism ==
IFC has been criticised for describing its candidates as independents, including by psephologist Kevin Bonham, who says IFC are "not independents". IFC has described itself as a "group of Canberrans supporting community independents", and Emerson says party registration is necessary because of the ACT's Hare–Clark electoral system, which makes it difficult for ungrouped independent candidates to succeed.

== Policies ==
IFC has a policy platform which was "developed in collaboration with experts and community members". Candidates are able to act independently, including if they are elected to parliament.

The party has sought to introduce a Future Generations Act, which requires politicians to consider the impact of laws on the next generation, as well as the introduction of a social housing "funding trigger".

== See also ==
- Fiona Carrick Independent
- Strong Independents
- Teal independents
