= Australian Capital Territory Electoral Commission =

Agency responsible for territory elections in the Australian Capital Territory

ACT Electoral Commission

Agency overview
- Jurisdiction: ACT Government
- Headquarters: Nara Centre, 3 Constitution Avenue, Canberra City Australian Capital Territory, Australia
- Employees: 14
- Annual budget: $4.2 million
- Minister responsible: Jeremy Hanson, Speaker of the Legislative Assembly
- Agency executives: David Kalisch, Chairperson; Damian Cantwell, Electoral Commissioner; Ed Killesteyn, Member
- Key documents: Electoral Act 1992; Electoral Regulation 1993; Referendum (Machinery Provisions) Act 1994; Proportional Representation (Hare-Clark) Entrenchment Act 1994; Aboriginal and Torres Strait Islander Elected Body Act 2008; Magistrates Court (Electoral Infringement Notices) Regulation 2012; Australian Capital Territory (Legislative Assembly) Act 2014
- Website: ACT Electoral Commission

The Australian Capital Territory Electoral Commission, branded Elections ACT, is the agency of the Government of the Australian Capital Territory with responsibility for the conduct of elections and referendums for the unicameral ACT Legislative Assembly; the determination of electoral boundaries for the ACT; and the provision of electoral advice and services to government and government agencies. The responsibilities and roles of the Commission are set out in the Electoral Act 1992 and subsequent amendments.

== Structure and Staffing ==
The ACT Electoral Commission comprises three statutory office holders - a Chairperson (David Kalisch), an Electoral Commissioner (Damian Cantwell) and a member (Ed Killesteyn). The Commissioner has the powers of a Chief Executive under the Public Sector Management Act 1994. At election times the Commissioner may draw additional staff from the ACT Public Service and from other Australian electoral authorities and employs casual staff under the Electoral Act 1992. Prior to 1 July 2014, the ACT Electoral Commission was under the Justice and Community Safety portfolio, with the ACT Attorney General, as the responsible Minister for Administrative purposes; the Commission also reports to the Speaker of the Legislative Assembly. Following the commencement of the Officers of the Assembly Legislation Amendment Act 2013, from 1 July 2014, the members of the Commission became Officers of the Legislative Assembly. This change in the status of the Commission reinforced the Commission's statutory independence from the Executive.

== See also ==
- Australian Capital Territory Legislative Assembly
- Electoral systems of the Australian states and territories
- Parliaments of the Australian states and territories
