= List of Australian Greens parliamentarians =

This is a list of Australian Greens Members of Parliament, past and present, for Federal, State and Territory Parliaments of Australia. There are currently 48 serving Parliamentary Members of the Greens.

The Greens are currently represented in the Australian House of Representatives, the Australian Senate, the New South Wales Legislative Assembly, the New South Wales Legislative Council, the Victorian Legislative Assembly, the Victorian Legislative Council, the Legislative Assembly of Queensland, the Western Australian Legislative Council, the South Australian Legislative Council, the Tasmanian House of Assembly, the Tasmanian Legislative Council, the ACT Legislative Assembly and the NT Legislative Assembly. The Greens have previously been represented in the South Australian House of Assembly and the Western Australian Legislative Assembly.

== List of parliamentarians ==
Image	Name	Chamber	Electorate	Term began	Term ended	Length of term	Total length of terms
	Bob Brown (Note: In Tasmania, members were elected as "Green Independents" until the Tasmanian Greens formed as a branch of the Australian Greens in August 1992.) (1944– )	Tasmanian House of Assembly	Denison	4 January 1983	12 February 1993	10 years, 39 days	26 years, 24 days
	Bob Brown (1944– )	Australian Senate	Tasmania	1 July 1996	15 June 2012	15 years, 350 days	26 years, 24 days
	Gerry Bates (1950– )	Tasmanian House of Assembly	Franklin	8 February 1986	4 May 1995	9 years, 85 days	
	Lance Armstrong (1940–2023)	Tasmanian House of Assembly	Bass	13 May 1989	24 February 1996	6 years, 287 days	
	Di Hollister (1947– )	Tasmanian House of Assembly	Braddon	13 May 1989	29 August 1998	9 years, 108 days	
	Christine Milne (1953– )	Tasmanian House of Assembly	Lyons	13 May 1989	29 August 1998	9 years, 108 days	19 years, 148 days
	Christine Milne (1953– )	Australian Senate	Tasmania	1 July 2005	10 August 2015	10 years, 40 days	19 years, 148 days
	Jo Vallentine (Note: The Greens WA were not formally affiliated with the Australian Greens until 11 October 2003.) (1946– )	Australian Senate	Western Australia	1 July 1990 (Note: Previously sat as an independent senator from 1 July 1985.)	31 January 1992	1 year, 214 days	
	Christabel Chamarette (1948– )	Australian Senate	Western Australia	12 March 1992	30 June 1996	4 years, 110 days	
	Peg Putt (1953– )	Tasmanian House of Assembly	Denison	2 March 1993	7 July 2008	15 years, 66 days	
	Jim Scott (1946– )	Western Australian Legislative Council	South Metropolitan	22 May 1993	26 January 2005	11 years, 249 days	
	Dee Margetts (1955– )	Australian Senate	Western Australia	1 July 1993	30 June 1999	5 years, 364 days	9 years, 363 days
	Dee Margetts (1955– )	Western Australian Legislative Council	Agricultural	22 May 2001	21 May 2005	3 years, 364 days	9 years, 363 days
	Lucy Horodny (1957– )	ACT Legislative Assembly	Ginninderra	18 February 1995	21 February 1998	3 years, 3 days	
	Kerrie Tucker (1948– )	ACT Legislative Assembly	Molonglo	15 February 1995	16 October 2004	9 years, 244 days	
	Ian Cohen (1951– )	New South Wales Legislative Council	Statewide	25 March 1995	4 March 2011	15 years, 344 days	
	Mike Foley (1946– )	Tasmanian House of Assembly	Franklin	16 May 1995	29 August 1998	3 years, 105 days	
	Chrissy Sharp (1947–2021)	Western Australian Legislative Council	South West	22 May 1997	21 May 2005	7 years, 364 days	
	Giz Watson (1957– )	Western Australian Legislative Council	North Metropolitan	22 May 1997	21 May 2013	15 years, 364 days	
	Lee Rhiannon (1951– )	New South Wales Legislative Council	Statewide	27 March 1999	19 July 2010	11 years, 114 days	17 years, 159 days
	Lee Rhiannon (1951– )	Australian Senate	New South Wales	1 July 2011	15 August 2018	7 years, 45 days	17 years, 159 days
	Robin Chapple (1947– )	Western Australian Legislative Council	Mining and Pastoral	22 May 2001	21 May 2005	3 years, 364 days	15 years, 363 days
	Robin Chapple (1947– )	Western Australian Legislative Council	Mining and Pastoral	22 May 2009	21 May 2021	11 years, 364 days	15 years, 363 days
	Kerry Nettle (1973– )	Australian Senate	New South Wales	1 July 2002	30 June 2008	5 years, 365 days	
	Kim Booth (1951– )	Tasmanian House of Assembly	Bass	20 July 2002	20 May 2015	12 years, 304 days	
	Nick McKim (1965– )	Tasmanian House of Assembly	Franklin	20 July 2002	4 August 2015	13 years, 15 days	24 years, 47 days
	Nick McKim (1965– )	Australian Senate	Tasmania	19 August 2015	incumbent	11 years, 32 days	24 years, 47 days
	Tim Morris (1955– )	Tasmanian House of Assembly	Lyons	20 July 2002	15 March 2014	11 years, 238 days	
	Michael Organ (1956– )	Australian House of Representatives	Cunningham (NSW)	19 October 2002	9 October 2004	1 year, 356 days	
	Kris Hanna (1962– )	South Australian House of Assembly	Mitchell	30 January 2003 (Note: Previously sat as a Labor MHA from 11 October 1997.)	8 February 2006 (Note: Resigned from the Greens and sat as an independent until 20 March 2010.)	3 years, 9 days	
	Sylvia Hale (1942– )	New South Wales Legislative Council	Statewide	22 March 2003	6 September 2010	7 years, 168 days	
	Deb Foskey (1949–2020)	ACT Legislative Assembly	Molonglo	16 October 2004	18 October 2008	4 years, 2 days	
	Lynn MacLaren (1962– )	Western Australian Legislative Council	South Metropolitan	15 February 2005	21 May 2005	95 days	8 years, 94 days
	Lynn MacLaren (1962– )	Western Australian Legislative Council	South Metropolitan	22 May 2009	21 May 2017	7 years, 364 days	8 years, 94 days
	Paul Llewellyn (1957– )	Western Australian Legislative Council	South West	22 May 2005	21 May 2009	3 years, 364 days	
	Rachel Siewert (1961– )	Australian Senate	Western Australia	1 July 2005	6 September 2021	16 years, 67 days	
	Mark Parnell (1959– )	South Australian Legislative Council	Statewide	18 March 2006	1 April 2021	15 years, 14 days	
	Greg Barber (1966– )	Victorian Legislative Council	Northern Metropolitan	25 November 2006	28 September 2017	10 years, 307 days	
	Colleen Hartland (1959– )	Victorian Legislative Council	Western Metropolitan	25 November 2006	8 February 2018	11 years, 75 days	
	Sue Pennicuik (1957– )	Victorian Legislative Council	Southern Metropolitan	25 November 2006	24 November 2018	11 years, 364 days	
	John Kaye (1955–2016)	New South Wales Legislative Council	Statewide	22 March 2007	2 May 2016	9 years, 41 days	
	Sarah Hanson-Young (1981– )	Australian Senate	South Australia	1 July 2008	incumbent	18 years, 81 days	
	Scott Ludlam (1970– )	Australian Senate	Western Australia	1 July 2008	14 July 2017	9 years, 13 days	
	Cassy O'Connor (1967– )	Tasmanian House of Assembly	Denison	21 July 2008	28 September 2018	10 years, 69 days	17 years, 130 days
	Cassy O'Connor (1967– )	Tasmanian House of Assembly	Clark	28 September 2018	13 July 2023	4 years, 288 days	17 years, 130 days
	Cassy O'Connor (1967– )	Tasmanian Legislative Council	Hobart	4 May 2024	incumbent	2 years, 139 days	17 years, 130 days
	Ronan Lee (1976– )	Queensland Legislative Assembly	Indooroopilly	5 October 2008 (Note: Previously sat as a Labor MLA from 17 February 2001.)	21 March 2009	167 days	
	Amanda Bresnan (1971– )	ACT Legislative Assembly	Brindabella	18 October 2008	20 October 2012	4 years, 2 days	
	Meredith Hunter (1962– )	ACT Legislative Assembly	Ginninderra	18 October 2008	20 October 2012	4 years, 2 days	
	Caroline Le Couteur (1952– )	ACT Legislative Assembly	Molonglo	18 October 2008	20 October 2012	4 years, 2 days	8 years, 4 days
	Caroline Le Couteur (1952– )	ACT Legislative Assembly	Murrumbidgee	15 October 2016	17 October 2020	4 years, 2 days	8 years, 4 days
	Shane Rattenbury (1971– )	ACT Legislative Assembly	Molonglo	18 October 2008	15 October 2016	7 years, 363 days	17 years, 209 days
	Shane Rattenbury (1971– )	ACT Legislative Assembly	Kurrajong	15 October 2016	15 May 2026	9 years, 212 days	17 years, 209 days
	Adele Carles (1968– )	Western Australian Legislative Assembly	Fremantle	16 May 2009	6 May 2010 (Note: Resigned from the Greens and sat as an independent until 9 March 2013.)	355 days	
	Alison Xamon (1969– )	Western Australian Legislative Council	East Metropolitan	22 May 2009	21 May 2013	3 years, 364 days	7 years, 363 days
	Alison Xamon (1969– )	Western Australian Legislative Council	North Metropolitan	22 May 2017	21 May 2021	3 years, 364 days	7 years, 363 days
	Tammy Franks (1968– )	South Australian Legislative Council	Statewide	20 March 2010	13 May 2025 (Note: Resigned from the Greens and sat as an independent until 20 March 2026.)	15 years, 54 days	
	Paul O'Halloran (1950– )	Tasmanian House of Assembly	Braddon	20 March 2010	15 March 2014	3 years, 360 days	
	Adam Bandt (1972– )	Australian House of Representatives	Melbourne (Vic)	21 August 2010	3 May 2025	14 years, 255 days	
	Cate Faehrmann (1970– )	New South Wales Legislative Council	Statewide	7 September 2010	18 June 2013	2 years, 284 days	10 years, 320 days
	Cate Faehrmann (1970– )	New South Wales Legislative Council	Statewide	15 August 2018	incumbent	8 years, 36 days	10 years, 320 days
	David Shoebridge (1971– )	New South Wales Legislative Council	Statewide	7 September 2010	11 April 2022	11 years, 216 days	15 years, 297 days
	David Shoebridge (1971– )	Australian Senate	New South Wales	1 July 2022	incumbent	4 years, 81 days	15 years, 297 days
	Jan Barham (1958– )	New South Wales Legislative Council	Statewide	26 March 2011	13 February 2017	5 years, 324 days	
	Jeremy Buckingham (1973– )	New South Wales Legislative Council	Statewide	26 March 2011	20 December 2018 (Note: Resigned from the Greens and sat as an independent until 23 March 2019.)	7 years, 269 days	
	Jamie Parker (1971– )	New South Wales Legislative Assembly	Balmain	26 March 2011	3 March 2023	11 years, 342 days	
	Richard Di Natale (1970– )	Australian Senate	Victoria	1 July 2011	26 August 2020	9 years, 56 days	
	Larissa Waters (1977– )	Australian Senate	Queensland	1 July 2011	18 July 2017	6 years, 17 days	14 years, 31 days
	Larissa Waters (1977– )	Australian Senate	Queensland	6 September 2018	incumbent	8 years, 14 days	14 years, 31 days
	Penny Wright (1961– )	Australian Senate	South Australia	1 July 2011	10 September 2015	4 years, 71 days	
	Peter Whish-Wilson (1968– )	Australian Senate	Tasmania	20 June 2012	14 August 2026	14 years, 55 days	
	Mehreen Faruqi (1963– )	New South Wales Legislative Council	Statewide	9 June 2013	14 August 2018	5 years, 66 days	13 years, 102 days
	Mehreen Faruqi (1963– )	Australian Senate	New South Wales	15 August 2018	incumbent	8 years, 36 days	13 years, 102 days
	Janet Rice (1960– )	Australian Senate	Victoria	1 July 2014	19 April 2024	9 years, 293 days	
	Samantha Dunn (1964– )	Victorian Legislative Council	Eastern Metropolitan	29 November 2014	24 November 2018	3 years, 360 days	
	Sam Hibbins (1982– )	Victorian Legislative Assembly	Prahran	29 November 2014	1 November 2024 (Note: Resigned from the Greens and sat as an independent until 23 November 2024.)	9 years, 338 days	
	Ellen Sandell (1984– )	Victorian Legislative Assembly	Melbourne	29 November 2014	incumbent	11 years, 295 days	
	Nina Springle (1973– )	Victorian Legislative Council	South Eastern Metropolitan	29 November 2014	24 November 2018	3 years, 360 days	
	Jenny Leong (1977– )	New South Wales Legislative Assembly	Newtown	28 March 2015	incumbent	11 years, 176 days	
	Tamara Smith	New South Wales Legislative Assembly	Ballina	28 March 2015	incumbent	11 years, 176 days	
	Andrea Dawkins (1965– )	Tasmanian House of Assembly	Bass	9 June 2015	3 March 2018	2 years, 267 days	
	Rosalie Woodruff	Tasmanian House of Assembly	Franklin	17 August 2015	incumbent	11 years, 34 days	
	Robert Simms (1984– )	Australian Senate	South Australia	22 September 2015	2 July 2016	284 days	6 years, 58 days
	Robert Simms (1984– )	South Australian Legislative Council	Statewide	4 May 2021	incumbent	5 years, 139 days	6 years, 58 days
	Justin Field	New South Wales Legislative Council	Statewide	24 August 2016	5 April 2019 (Note: Resigned from the Greens and sat as an independent until 3 March 2023.)	2 years, 224 days	
	Dawn Walker	New South Wales Legislative Council	Statewide	22 February 2017	23 March 2019	2 years, 29 days	
	Tim Clifford (1982– )	Western Australian Legislative Council	East Metropolitan	22 May 2017	21 May 2021	3 years, 364 days	5 years, 120 days
	Tim Clifford (1982– )	Western Australian Legislative Council	Statewide	22 May 2025	incumbent	1 year, 121 days	5 years, 120 days
	Diane Evers (1963– )	Western Australian Legislative Council	South West	22 May 2017	21 May 2021	3 years, 364 days	
	Samantha Ratnam (1977– )	Victorian Legislative Council	Northern Metropolitan	19 October 2017	8 November 2024	7 years, 20 days	
	Andrew Bartlett (1964– )	Australian Senate	Queensland	10 November 2017	27 August 2018	290 days	
	Jordon Steele-John (1994– )	Australian Senate	Western Australia	10 November 2017	incumbent	8 years, 314 days	
	Lidia Thorpe (1973– )	Victorian Legislative Assembly	Northcote	18 November 2017	24 November 2018	1 year, 6 days	3 years, 161 days
	Lidia Thorpe (1973– )	Australian Senate	Victoria	4 September 2020	6 February 2023 (Note: Resigned from the Greens and continues to sit as an independent.)	2 years, 155 days	3 years, 161 days
	Michael Berkman (1981– )	Queensland Legislative Assembly	Maiwar	25 November 2017	incumbent	8 years, 299 days	
	Huong Truong	Victorian Legislative Council	Western Metropolitan	21 February 2018	24 November 2018	276 days	
	Tim Read (1962–2026)	Victorian Legislative Assembly	Brunswick	24 November 2018	19 September 2026	7 years, 299 days	
	Abigail Boyd	New South Wales Legislative Council	Statewide	23 March 2019	incumbent	7 years, 181 days	
	Andrew Braddock (1978– )	ACT Legislative Assembly	Yerrabi	17 October 2020	incumbent	5 years, 338 days	
	Jo Clay (1977– )	ACT Legislative Assembly	Ginninderra	17 October 2020	incumbent	5 years, 338 days	
	Emma Davidson (1974– )	ACT Legislative Assembly	Murrumbidgee	17 October 2020	19 October 2024	4 years, 2 days	
	Johnathan Davis (1991– )	ACT Legislative Assembly	Brindabella	17 October 2020	12 November 2023	3 years, 26 days	
	Rebecca Vassarotti (1972– )	ACT Legislative Assembly	Kurrajong	17 October 2020	19 October 2024	4 years, 2 days	4 years, 110 days
	Rebecca Vassarotti (1972– )	ACT Legislative Assembly	Kurrajong	4 June 2026	incumbent	108 days	4 years, 110 days
	Amy MacMahon (1986– )	Queensland Legislative Assembly	South Brisbane	31 October 2020	26 October 2024	3 years, 361 days	
	Brad Pettitt (1972– )	Western Australian Legislative Council	South Metropolitan	22 May 2021	21 May 2025	3 years, 364 days	5 years, 120 days
	Brad Pettitt (1972– )	Western Australian Legislative Council	Statewide	22 May 2025	incumbent	1 year, 121 days	5 years, 120 days
	Dorinda Cox (1976– )	Australian Senate	Western Australia	14 September 2021	2 June 2025 (Note: Resigned from the Greens and continues to sit as a Labor senator.)	3 years, 261 days	
	Sue Higginson	New South Wales Legislative Council	Statewide	12 May 2022	incumbent	4 years, 131 days	
	Stephen Bates (1992– )	Australian House of Representatives	Brisbane (Qld)	21 May 2022	3 May 2025	2 years, 347 days	
	Max Chandler-Mather (1992– )	Australian House of Representatives	Griffith (Qld)	21 May 2022	3 May 2025	2 years, 347 days	
	Elizabeth Watson-Brown (1956– )	Australian House of Representatives	Ryan (Qld)	21 May 2022	incumbent	4 years, 122 days	
	Penny Allman-Payne (1970– )	Australian Senate	Queensland	1 July 2022	incumbent	4 years, 81 days	
	Barbara Pocock (1955– )	Australian Senate	South Australia	1 July 2022	incumbent	4 years, 81 days	
	Katherine Copsey	Victorian Legislative Council	Southern Metropolitan	26 November 2022	incumbent	3 years, 298 days	
	Gabrielle de Vietri (1983– )	Victorian Legislative Assembly	Richmond	26 November 2022	incumbent	3 years, 298 days	
	Sarah Mansfield	Victorian Legislative Council	Western Victoria	26 November 2022	incumbent	3 years, 298 days	
	Aiv Puglielli	Victorian Legislative Council	North-Eastern Metropolitan	26 November 2022	incumbent	3 years, 298 days	
	Amanda Cohn	New South Wales Legislative Council	Statewide	25 March 2023	incumbent	3 years, 179 days	
	Kobi Shetty	New South Wales Legislative Assembly	Balmain	25 March 2023	incumbent	3 years, 179 days	
	Vica Bayley (1971– )	Tasmanian House of Assembly	Clark	1 August 2023	incumbent	3 years, 50 days	
	Laura Nuttall	ACT Legislative Assembly	Brindabella	27 November 2023	incumbent	2 years, 297 days	
	Tabatha Badger (1993– )	Tasmanian House of Assembly	Lyons	23 March 2024	incumbent	2 years, 181 days	
	Helen Burnet (1964– )	Tasmanian House of Assembly	Clark	23 March 2024	2 January 2026	1 year, 285 days	
	Cecily Rosol (1975– )	Tasmanian House of Assembly	Bass	23 March 2024	incumbent	2 years, 181 days	
	Steph Hodgins-May (1985– )	Australian Senate	Victoria	1 May 2024	incumbent	2 years, 142 days	
	Kat McNamara	Northern Territory Legislative Assembly	Nightcliff	26 August 2024	9 February 2026	1 year, 167 days	
	Anasina Gray-Barberio	Victorian Legislative Council	Northern Metropolitan	13 November 2024	incumbent	1 year, 310 days	
	Jess Beckerling	Western Australian Legislative Council	Statewide	22 May 2025	incumbent	1 year, 121 days	
	Sophie McNeill	Western Australian Legislative Council	Statewide	22 May 2025	incumbent	1 year, 121 days	
	Melanie Selwood	South Australian Legislative Council	Statewide	21 March 2026	incumbent	183 days	
	Vanessa Bleyer	Australian Senate	Tasmania	20 August 2026	incumbent	31 days	

== Greens representation from year to year ==
The table below represents the parliamentary representation of Greens politicians from 1983 to the present. Bob Brown was the first elected Greens representative, initially elected to the Tasmanian House of Assembly in 1983. He was joined by Gerry Bates in 1986.

Parliamentary representation of The Greens
	Federal	Tasmania	Western Australia	ACT	New South Wales	South Australia	Victoria	Queensland	NT	Total
1983		1								1
1986		2								2
1989		5								5
1990	1	5								6
1993	2	5	1							8
1995	2	5	1	2	1					11
1996	2	4	1	2	1					10
1997	2	4	3	2	1					12
1998	2	1	3	1	1					8
1999	1	1	3	1	2					8
2001	1	1	5	1	2					10
2002	3	4	5	1	2					15
2003	3	4	5	1	3	1				17
2004	2	4	5	1	3	1				16
2005	4	4	2	1	3	1				15
2006	4	4	2	1	3	1	3			18
2007	4	4	2	1	4	1	3			19
2008	5	4	2	4	4	1	3	1		24
2009	5	4	5	4	4	1	3			26
2010	6	5	4	4	4	2	3			28
2011	10	5	4	4	6	2	3			34
2012	10	5	4	1	6	2	3			31
2013	10	5	2	1	6	2	3			29
2014	11	3	2	1	6	2	7			32
2015	11	3	2	1	8	2	7			34
2016	10	3	2	2	8	2	7			34
2017	10	3	4	2	8	2	8	1		38
2018	10	2	4	2	8	2	4	1		33
2019	10	2	4	2	7	2	4	1		32
2020	10	2	4	6	6	2	4	2		36
2021	10	2	1	6	6	2	4	2		33
2022	16	2	1	6	6	2	8	2		43
2023	15	2	1	6	7	2	8	2		43
2024	15	6	1	4	7	2	7	2	1	45
