= Frontbench of the ACT Greens =

- Australian Capital Territory
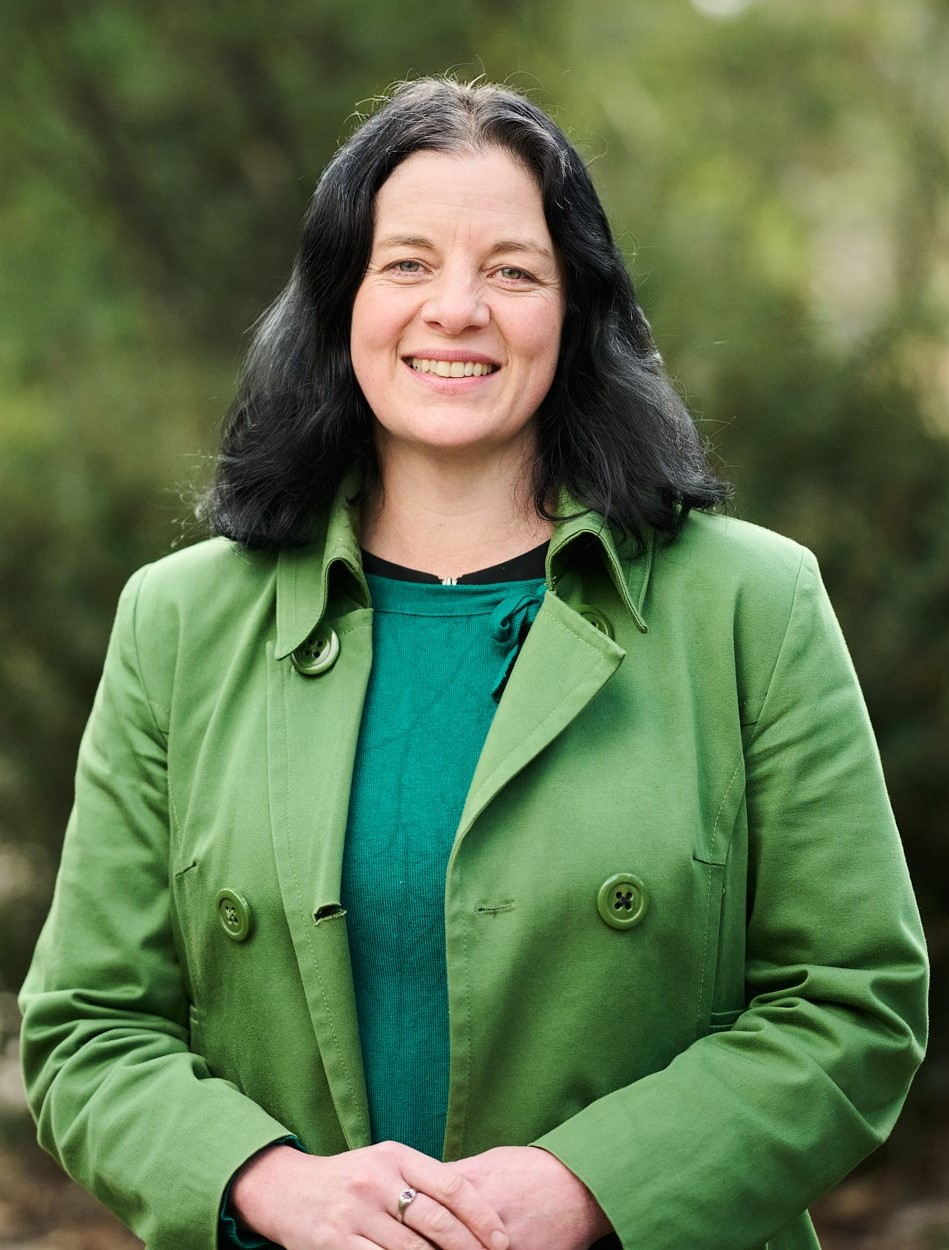
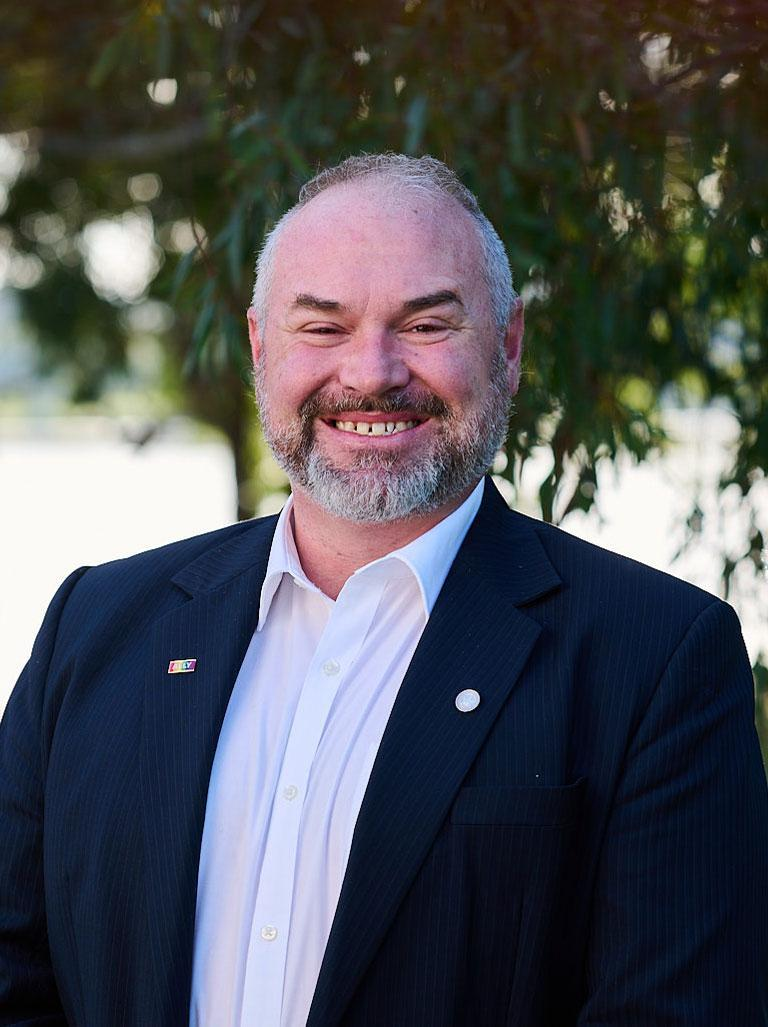
- Jo Clay (Leader) Andrew Braddock (Deputy Leader)
- Date formed: 15 May 2026

People and organisations
- Leader: Jo Clay
- Deputy Leader: Andrew Braddock
- Total no. of members: 4
- Member party: ACT Greens
- Status in legislature: Crossbench 4 / 24 (17%)

History
- Elections: 2024 (legislative); 2026 (leadership)
- Legislature term: 11th Assembly
- Predecessor: Fourth Rattenbury frontbench

The frontbench of the ACT Greens refers to the various portfolios and leadership positions held by the ACT Greens' MLAs.

The current frontbench was unveiled on 4 June 2026 and is led by Jo Clay who has been leader since 15 May 2026 and her deputy Andrew Braddock who has been leader since 30 June 2026. The frontbench is composed of all Greens MLAs and Clay is the party's first new leader in 13 years following the retirement of Shane Rattenbury. It shadows the Fourth Barr ministry alongside the Parton shadow ministry.

On 15 May 2026, Shane Rattenbury resigned from the Assembly to retire. This resulted in Jo Clay automatically becoming Leader and a casual vacancy in the seat of Kurrajong which was filled by Rebecca Vassarotti via countback. A leadership ballot of party members was held which confirmed Clay as leader over challenger Vassarotti and elected Braddock as deputy.

== Structure ==
At times when the party is not a member of a coalition government, the frontbench of the ACT Greens consists of Spokespeople for several portfolios each, similarly to how ACT cabinet and shadow cabinet members are typically responsible for numerous separate portfolios.

At times when the party is a part of a coalition government (such as the Labor–Greens coalition from 2012 to 2024) and some MLAs are cabinet ministers, the party retains spokespeople for portfolios not covered by the ministries held by the party. These spokespeople are typically picked from Greens government backbenchers (i.e. those Greens MLAs who are not ministers), however ministers do occasionally hold spokesperson portfolios alongside their ministerial portfolios.

== Current composition ==
Member	Portfolios
Jo Clay MLA (born 1977) Member for Ginninderra (since 2020)	Leader of the ACT Greens; Spokesperson for the Environment; Spokesperson for Treasury and Economic Equality; Spokesperson for Planning; Spokesperson for Birth; Spokesperson for the Circular Economy; Spokesperson for the Arts; Spokesperson for Animal Welfare
Andrew Braddock MLA (born 1978) Member for Yerrabi (since 2020)	Deputy Leader of the ACT Greens; Deputy Speaker of the ACT Legislative Assembly; Spokesperson for Transport; Spokesperson for Municipal Services; Spokesperson for Emergency Services; Spokesperson for Integrity and Public Service Transformation; Spokesperson for Democracy; Spokesperson for Climate Change; Spokesperson for Anti-Racism and Multicultural Affairs
Laura Nuttall MLA (born 1999) Member for Brindabella (since 2023)	ACT Greens Party Whip; Spokesperson for Education, Skills & Training; Spokesperson for Young People; Spokesperson for Women; Spokesperson for Disability; Spokesperson for Sports & Recreation; Spokesperson for LGBTIQA+ Affairs; Spokesperson for Air and Water
Rebecca Vassarotti MLA (born 1999) Member for Kurrajong (since 2023)	Spokesperson for Housing; Spokesperson for Health and Mental Health; Spokesperson for Justice, Corrections, Policing, and Domestic, Family and Sexual Violence; Spokesperson for Aboriginal and Torres Strait Islander Affairs; Spokesperson for Gaming Reform; Spokesperson for Ageing and Carers; Spokesperson for Veterans

== Previous compositions ==
=== Interim Clay frontbench (2026) ===
Member	Portfolios
Jo Clay MLA (born 1977) Member for Ginninderra (since 2020)	Leader of the ACT Greens; Spokesperson for Planning & Urban Renewal; Spokesperson for Environment; Spokesperson for Circular Economy & Waste; Spokesperson for Arts & the Nighttime Economy; Spokesperson for Animal Welfare; Spokesperson for Heritage; Spokesperson for Finance
Andrew Braddock MLA (born 1978) Member for Yerrabi (since 2020)	Deputy Speaker of the ACT Legislative Assembly; Spokesperson for Transport; Spokesperson for Climate Change Adaptation; Spokesperson for Democracy, Integrity and Public Service Transformation; Spokesperson for Municipal Services; Spokesperson for Emergency Services; Spokesperson for Veterans; Spokesperson for Multicultural Affairs; Spokesperson for Carers
Laura Nuttall MLA (born 1999) Member for Brindabella (since 2023)	ACT Greens Party Whip; Spokesperson for Education, Skills & Training; Spokesperson for Young People; Spokesperson for Water; Spokesperson for Women; Spokesperson for Disability; Spokesperson for Sports & Recreation; Spokesperson for LGBTIQA+ Affairs

=== Fourth Rattenbury frontbench (2024–2026) ===
Member	Portfolios
Shane Rattenbury MLA (born 1971) Member for Kurrajong (since 2016)	Leader of the ACT Greens; Spokesperson for Housing; Spokesperson for Climate Change Mitigation; Spokesperson for Health and Mental Health; Spokesperson for Treasury; Spokesperson for Justice, Law, Corrections & Policing; Spokesperson for Family, Domestic and Sexual Violence; Spokesperson for Aboriginal and Torres Strait Islander Affairs; Spokesperson for Gaming Reform; Spokesperson for Business, Tourism and Trade; Spokesperson for Ageing
Jo Clay MLA (born 1977) Member for Ginninderra (since 2020)	Deputy Leader of the ACT Greens; Spokesperson for Planning & Urban Renewal; Spokesperson for Environment; Spokesperson for Circular Economy & Waste; Spokesperson for Arts & the Nighttime Economy; Spokesperson for Animal Welfare; Spokesperson for Heritage; Spokesperson for Finance
Andrew Braddock MLA (born 1978) Member for Yerrabi (since 2020)	Deputy Speaker of the ACT Legislative Assembly; Spokesperson for Transport; Spokesperson for Climate Change Adaptation; Spokesperson for Democracy, Integrity and Public Service Transformation; Spokesperson for Municipal Services; Spokesperson for Emergency Services; Spokesperson for Veterans; Spokesperson for Multicultural Affairs; Spokesperson for Carers
Laura Nuttall MLA (born 1999) Member for Brindabella (since 2023)	ACT Greens Party Whip; Spokesperson for Education, Skills & Training; Spokesperson for Young People; Spokesperson for Water; Spokesperson for Women; Spokesperson for Disability; Spokesperson for Sports & Recreation; Spokesperson for LGBTIQA+ Affairs

=== Third Rattenbury frontbench (2020–2024) ===
==== Final iteration ====
Member	Portfolios
Shane Rattenbury MLA (born 1971) Member for Kurrajong (since 2016)	Leader of the ACT Greens; Attorney-General; Minister for Water, Energy and Emissions Reduction; Minister for Gaming; Minister for Consumer Affairs; Spokesperson for Treasury; Spokesperson for First Nations affairs
Rebecca Vassarotti MLA (born 1977) Member for Kurrajong (2020–2024)	Deputy Leader of the ACT Greens (from 13 March 2024); Minister for the Environment; Minister for Heritage; Minister for Homelessness & Housing Services; Minister for Sustainable Building & Construction; Minister for Parks & Land Management
Emma Davidson MLA (born 1977) Member for Murrumbidgee (2020–2024)	Minister for Population Health; Minister for Corrections and Justice Health; Minister for Mental Health; Minister for Community Services, Seniors & Veterans; Spokesperson for Disability; Spokesperson for Health; Spokesperson for Prevention of Family & Domestic Violence; Spokesperson for Digital and IT
Jo Clay MLA (born 1977) Member for Ginninderra (since 2020)	Spokesperson for Transport; Spokesperson for Active Travel & Road Safety; Spokesperson for Arts and Culture; Spokesperson for Circular Economy; Spokesperson for Planning; Spokesperson for Business & the Night Time Economy
Andrew Braddock MLA (born 1978) Member for Yerrabi (since 2020)	Spokesperson for Better Neighbourhoods; Spokesperson for Corrections; Spokesperson for Democracy, Integrity and Community Engagement; Spokesperson for Multicultural Affairs; Spokesperson for Police and Emergency Services; Spokesperson for Workplace Safety and Industrial Relations
Laura Nuttall MLA (born 1999) Member for Brindabella (since 2023)	Spokesperson for Young People (inc. Youth Justice); Spokesperson for Education; Spokesperson for LGBTQIA+ Affairs; Spokesperson for Sport & Recreation; Spokesperson for Tourism & Events; Spokesperson for Women; Spokesperson for Animal Welfare

==== First iteration (2020–2023) ====
Member	Portfolios
Shane Rattenbury MLA (born 1971) Member for Kurrajong (since 2016)	Leader of the ACT Greens; Attorney-General; Minister for Water, Energy and Emissions Reduction; Minister for Gaming; Minister for Consumer Affairs
Rebecca Vassarotti MLA (born 1977) Member for Kurrajong (2020–2024)	Minister for the Environment; Minister for Heritage, Homelessness and Housing Services; Minister for Sustainable Building and Construction
Emma Davidson MLA (born 1977) Member for Murrumbidgee (2020–2024)	Minister for Disability; Minister for Justice Health; Minister for Mental Health; Minister for Seniors and Veterans; Assistant Minister for Seniors, Veterans, Families and Community Services (from 17 February 2021); Assistant Minister for Families and Community Services (until 17 February 2021); Carers; Seniors; Community Recovery and Emergency Relief; Veterans and their families; Volunteering; Youth Justice
Jo Clay MLA (born 1977) Member for Ginninderra (since 2020)	Spokesperson for Transport; Spokesperson for Active Travel; Spokesperson for Parks and Conservation; Spokesperson for Animal Welfare; Spokesperson for Arts and Culture; Spokesperson for Circular Economy; Spokesperson for Science; Spokesperson for Women
Andrew Braddock MLA (born 1978) Member for Yerrabi (since 2020)	Spokesperson for Better Neighbourhoods; Spokesperson for Corrections; Spokesperson for Democracy, Integrity and Community Engagement; Spokesperson for Multicultural Affairs; Spokesperson for Police and Emergency Services; Spokesperson for Workplace Safety and Industrial Relations
Johnathan Davis MLA (born 1978) Member for Brindabella (2020–2023)	Spokesperson for Education; Spokesperson for Health; Spokesperson for Drug Harm Minimisation; Spokesperson for Business & the Night-time Economy; Spokesperson for LGBTIQA+ Affairs; Spokesperson for Sport & Recreation; Spokesperson for Elimination of Family & Domestic Violence; Spokesperson for Tourism & Events; Spokesperson for Young People

=== Second Rattenbury frontbench (2016–2020) ===
Member	Portfolios
Shane Rattenbury MLA (born 1971) Member for Kurrajong (since 2016)	Leader of the ACT Greens; Minister for Climate Change and Sustainability; Minister for Corrections and Justice Health; Minister for Justice, Consumer Affairs and Road Safety; Minister for Mental Health; Spokesperson for Aboriginal and Torres Strait Islander Affairs; Spokesperson for Attorney General; Spokesperson for Education; Spokesperson for Environment; Spokesperson for Gambling Reform; Spokesperson for Health; Spokesperson for Multiculturalism; Spokesperson for Police and Emergency Services; Spokesperson for Sport and Recreation; Spokesperson for Tourism and Events; Spokesperson for Workplace Safety and Industrial Relations; Spokesperson for Young People
Caroline Le Couteur MLA (born 1952) Member for Murrumbidgee (2016–2020)	Spokesperson for Planning; Spokesperson for Territory and Municipal Services; Spokesperson for Business and Economic Development; Spokesperson for Indigenous Affairs; Spokesperson for Arts and Heritage

=== First Rattenbury frontbench (2012–2016) ===
Member	Portfolios
Shane Rattenbury MLA (born 1971) Member for Molonglo (2008–2016)	Leader of the ACT Greens; Minister for Corrections (from 22 January 2016); Minister for Education (from 22 January 2016); Minister for Road Safety (from 22 January 2016); Minister for Justice and Consumer Affairs (from 22 January 2016); Minister for Territory and Municipal Services (until 22 January 2016); Minister assisting the Chief Minister on Transport Reform (21 January 2015 – 22 January 2016); Minister for Aboriginal and Torres Strait Islander Affairs (until 20 January 2015); Minister for Sport and Recreation (7 July 2014 – 22 January 2016); Minister for Corrective Services (7 July 2014 – 10 December 2014); Minister for Corrections (until 6 July 2014); Minister for Housing (until 6 July 2014); Minister for Ageing (until 6 July 2014); Spokesperson for Attorney General; Spokesperson for Environment, Climate Change and Water; Spokesperson for Energy; Spokesperson for Police and Emergency Services; Spokesperson for Tourism, Sport and Recreation

=== Hunter frontbench (2008–2012) ===
Member	Portfolios
Meredith Hunter (born 1962) Member for Ginninderra (2008–2012)	Parliamentary Convenor of the ACT Greens; Spokesperson for Treasury; Spokesperson for Education and Training; Spokesperson for Community Services; Spokesperson for Women; Spokesperson for Children and Young People
Shane Rattenbury MLA (born 1971) Member for Molonglo (2008–2016)	Speaker; Spokesperson for Attorney General; Spokesperson for Environment, Climate Change and Water; Spokesperson for Energy; Spokesperson for Police and Emergency Services; Spokesperson for Tourism, Sport and Recreation
Caroline Le Couteur MLA (born 1952) Member for Murrumbidgee (2008–2012)	Assistant Speaker; Spokesperson for Planning; Spokesperson for Territory and Municipal Services; Spokesperson for Business and Economic Development; Spokesperson for Indigenous Affairs; Spokesperson for Arts and Heritage
Amanda Bresnan MLA (born 1971) Member for Brindabella (2008–2012)	Crossbench Whip; ACT Greens Party Whip; Manager of Greens Business; Spokesperson for Health; Spokesperson for Transport; Spokesperson for Disability and Housing; Spokesperson for Ageing; Spokesperson for Multicultural Affairs; Spokesperson for Industrial Relations; Spokesperson for Corrections
