= 2026 ACT Greens leadership ballot =

- 15 – 28 June 2026
- Turnout: 53%
- Leadership ballot
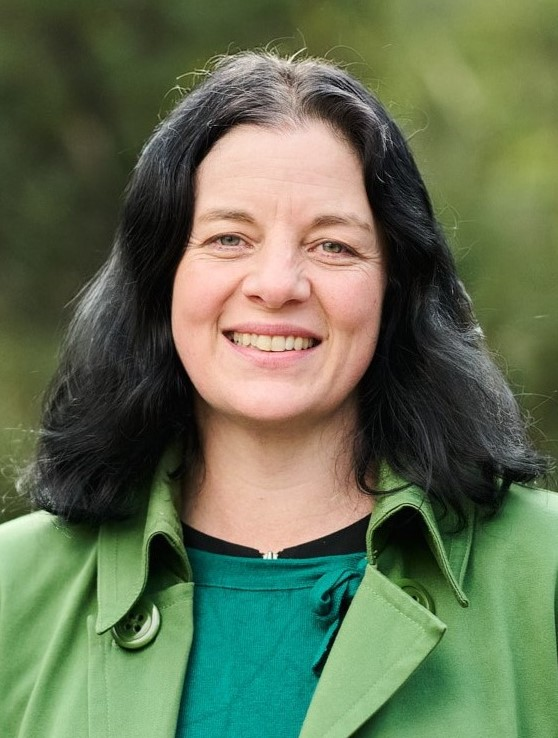

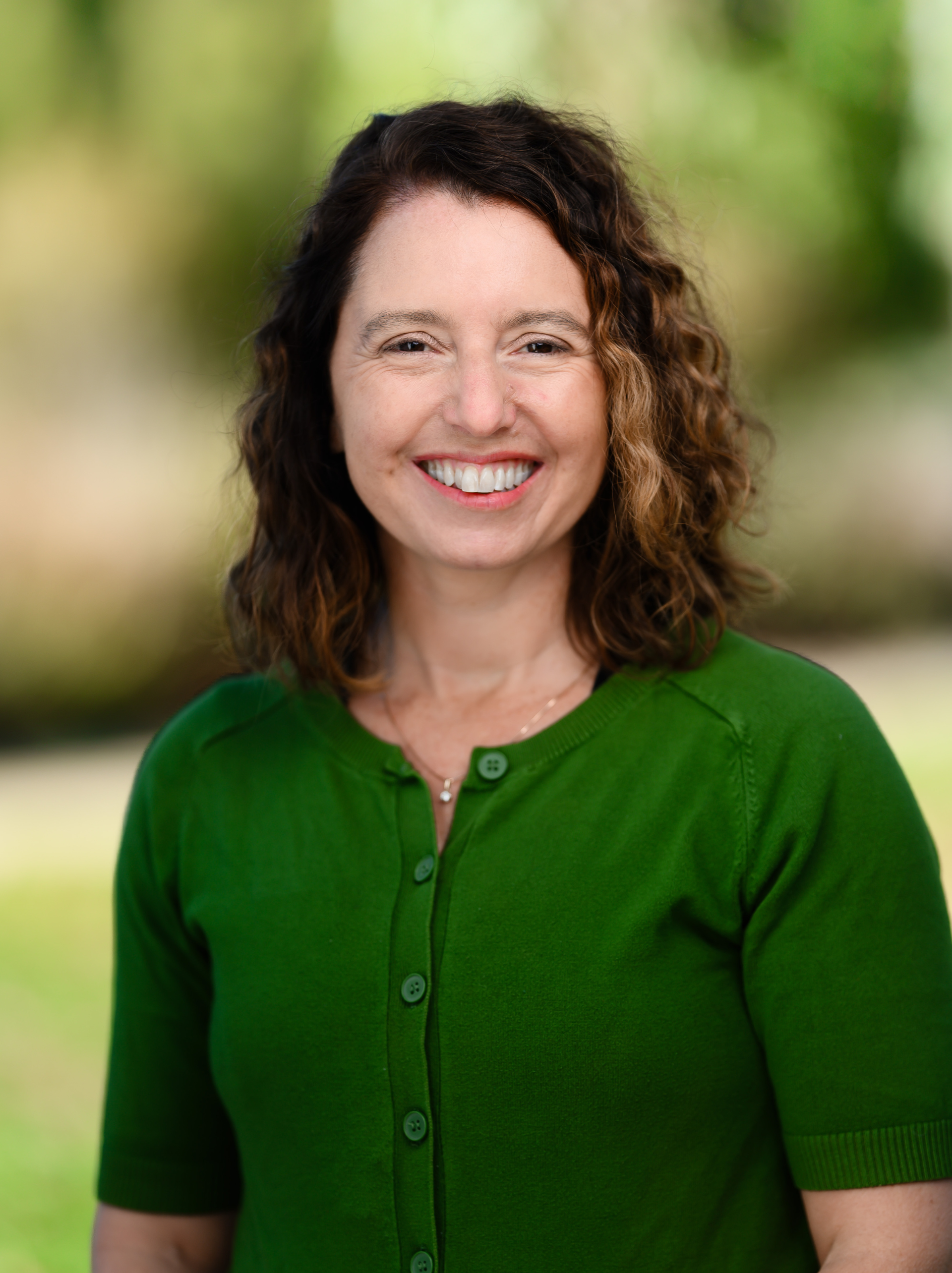
Candidate	Jo Clay	Rebecca Vassarotti
Seat	Ginninderra	Kurrajong
Percentage	61%	38%
Leader before election
Shane Rattenbury (Note: Strictly speaking, Jo Clay was leader in the office's full capacity since Rattenbury resigned from the assembly.)
Elected Leader
Jo Clay
- Deputy leadership ballot
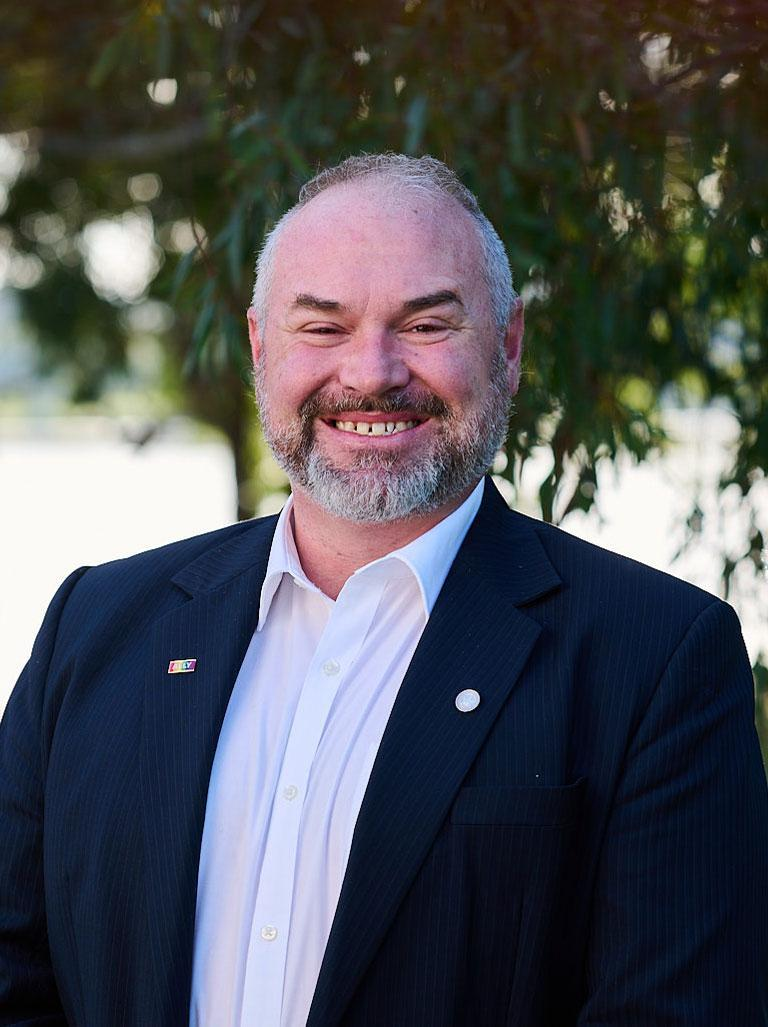

Candidate	Andrew Braddock	Seek Further Candidates
Seat	Yerrabi	N/A
Percentage	86%	14%
Swing	▲86%	▲3%
Deputy Leader before election
Jo Clay (Note: Strictly speaking, the office was vacant since Jo Clay automatically became leader when Shane Rattenbury resigned from the assembly.)
Deputy Leader following election
Andrew Braddock

A ballot of members was held by the ACT Greens between 15 and 28 June 2026 to elect a new leader and deputy leader following Shane Rattenbury's retirement from legislative assembly politics. Jo Clay was elected leader and Andrew Braddock was elected deputy leader.

This was the second election for the office of leader and third for the office of deputy since directly elected leadership was introduced ahead of the 2024 Australian Capital Territory election.

== Background ==
On 20 April 2026, Rattenbury announced his impending retirement which occurred on 15 May 2026.

He had been planning to step down sometime in the 11th Assembly since at least October 2024, having signalled to the party that the election that year would be his last. There has been speculation that his retirement is to do with discussions of the potential of a Green–Liberal government that was shot down by the Greens membership at the start of 2026, however Rattenbury has denied this and reaffirmed that the move has been in the pipeline for some time. He cited age, length of his tenure and the nature of the role as tough and wearying, among other factors, as reasons for his retirement.

Rattenbury's resignation triggered a countback in his electorate of Kurrajong. Rebecca Vassarotti, the second ACT Greens lead candidate in Kurrajong at the last election, nominated for the countback was successfully elected. Vassarotti was the party's first deputy leader, being elected alongside the party's slate of candidates for the 2024 election at which she was not re-elected.

Rattenbury's resignation from the Assembly also automatically transferred the leadership to then deputy Jo Clay who called a leadership election. While she has been referred to as "interim" or "acting" leader by some, Clay has officially held the office in its full capacity since Rattenbury's retirement. This left the deputy leadership vacant in the period between Rattenbury's resignation and the election.

Rebecca Vassarotti left the door open to running for the leadership prior to her confirmation as Shane Rattenbury's successor in the seat of Kurrajong, later confirming her ambition after being sworn in and becoming eligible.

== Voting system ==
The ACT Greens use a ballot of solely the membership to elect parliamentary leaders in contrast to most other Australian political parties which use caucus or party room votes to elect their leaders.

The ACT Greens are so far the only significant party in Australia to use this method, though some other parties have provisions to use similar systems if a office of leader is established.

== Key dates ==
- 20 April 2026 — Shane Rattenbury announces his impending retirement
- 15 April 2026 — Shane Rattenbury resigns from the Assembly; Jo Clay officially assumes the leadership
- 4 June 2026 — Rebecca Vassarotti is elected in a countback for the seat of Kurrajong
- 10 June 2026 — Rebecca Vassarotti is sworn in as a Member of the Legislative Assembly
- 15 June 2026 — Voting opens
- 16 June 2026 — A candidates forum is held at the party office
- 28 June 2026 — Voting closes
- 29 June 2026 — Results are declared at the monthly members' Forum
- 30 June 2026 — Results are announced to the public

== Candidates ==
=== Candidates for the leadership ===
Candidate	Electorate	History
Jo Clay; MLA	Ginninderra (since 2020)	Leader of the ACT Greens (since 2026); Deputy Leader of the ACT Greens (2024–2026); Spokesperson for: Finance; Environment; Arts & the Nighttime Economy; Planning & Urban Renewal; Circular Economy & Waste; Animal Welfare; Heritage
Rebecca Vassarotti; MLA	Kurrajong (2020–24; since 2026)	Deputy Leader of the ACT Greens (2024); Convenor of the ACT Greens Campaign Team (until 2026); Minister for Environment and Heritage (2020–2024); Minister for Homelessness and Housing Services (2020–2024); Minister for Sustainable Building and Construction (2020–2024)

=== Candidates for the deputy leadership ===
Candidate	Electorate	History
Andrew Braddock; MLA	Yerrabi (since 2020)	Deputy Speaker of the ACT Legislative Assembly (since 2024); Spokesperson for: Transport; Climate Change Adaptation; Democracy, Integrity, & Public Service Transformation; Municipal Services; Emergency Services; Veterans; Multicultural Affairs; Carers

== Results ==
The election had 53% turnout with some ballots being left blank for the deputy leadership. Clay won the leadership by a margin of nearly two to one and Braddock was confirmed with eighty-six percent of the vote. Seek further candidates received less than one percent in the leadership election and fourteen percent for the deputy leadership, a typical result for an uncontested election.

=== Leadership results ===
2026 ACT Greens leadership election
Party	Candidate	Votes	%	±%
Greens	Jo Clay		61	
Greens	Rebecca Vassarotti		38	
	Seek further candidates		1	
Total votes			53	

=== Deputy leadership results ===
2026 ACT Greens deputy leadership election
Party	Candidate	Votes	%	±%
Greens	Andrew Braddock		86	+86
	Seek further candidates		14	+3
Total votes			<53	

== Aftermath ==
=== Government negotiations ===
Following the election Clay ruled out any possibility of a coalition with either Labor or the Canberra Liberals in the current term. The party also confirmed the composition of its frontbench.

The confidence and supply agreement between the Greens and Labor, an agreement between the leaders of the two parties, lapsed following the change in leader and needed to be either re-negotiated or re-signed.

Following discussions during the Summer, the party had recently established the Advisory Arrangements Working Group (AAWG) which advises partyroom on government formation negotiations. The group organised a politics in the pub with Clay was held on 2 July and a confidential members-only workshop was held at some point later.

Following negotiations, the Greens did not sign a new confidence and supply agreement, marking the first time the party had not been supporting Labor in either minority or coalition government since 2008. This left Labor in the precarious position of being in a minority government without enough guaranteed confidence to be sure they would not be toppled in the case of a motion of no confidence in the Chief Minister and without enough supply to guarantee the passage of future budgets.

=== Reactions ===
Chief Minister and Labor leader Andrew Barr congratulated Clay on her victory and committed to work constructively with the ACT Greens in regard to the two parties' confidence and supply agreement.

Fiona Carrick Independent MLA Fiona Carrick congratulated Clay and Braddock on their election, calling the leadership victory a "well-deserved appointment" and an "important moment" for the party.

=== Other ===
In October 2026, Vassarotti signed as open letter as a "MP who lost a leadership election through one member, one vote" calling on the Australian Greens to adopt the voting for federal leadership elections to replace the current model of a partyroom vote.
