= List of Australian Capital Territory Legislative Assembly casual vacancies =

This is a list of casual vacancies in the Australian Capital Territory Legislative Assembly, caused by the resignation or death of an incumbent member. A departure creates a casual vacancy which is filled by a countback of the votes for the departing member at the previous election. Prior to the introduction of the Hare-Clark electoral system in 1995, casual vacancies were instead filled by appointment by the party of the departing member.

== List of countbacks (1995-present) ==
| Date | Electorate | Outgoing MP | Party | Elected MP | Party | Cause |
|---|---|---|---|---|---|---|
| 4 June 2026 | Kurrajong | Shane Rattenbury | Greens | Rebecca Vassarotti | Greens | Resignation |
| 28 November 2023 | Brindabella | Johnathan Davis | Greens | Laura Nuttall | Greens | Resignation |
| 22 June 2022 | Murrumbidgee | Giulia Jones | Liberal | Ed Cocks | Liberal | Resignation |
| 26 March 2021 | Yerrabi | Alistair Coe | Liberal | James Milligan | Liberal | Resignation |
| 23 July 2019 | Yerrabi | Meegan Fitzharris | Labor | Deepak-Raj Gupta | Labor | Resignation |
| 13 December 2017 | Kurrajong | Steve Doszpot | Liberal | Candice Burch | Liberal | Death |
| 29 July 2016 | Brindabella | Brendan Smyth | Liberal | Val Jeffery | Liberal | Resignation |
| 7 March 2016 | Ginninderra | Mary Porter | Labor | Jayson Hinder | Labor | Resignation |
| 16 January 2015 | Molonglo | Katy Gallagher | Labor | Meegan Fitzharris | Labor | Resignation |
| 26 June 2013 | Brindabella | Zed Seselja | Liberal | Nicole Lawder | Liberal | Resignation |
| 1 June 2011 | Ginninderra | Jon Stanhope | Labor | Chris Bourke | Labor | Resignation |
| 5 April 2006 | Molonglo | Ted Quinlan | Labor | Andrew Barr | Labor | Resignation |
| 10 February 2003 | Molonglo | Gary Humphries | Liberal | Jacqui Burke | Liberal | Resignation |
| 18 January 2001 | Molonglo | Kate Carnell | Liberal | Jacqui Burke | Liberal | Resignation |
| 13 February 1997 | Brindabella | Tony De Domenico | Liberal | Louise Littlewood | Liberal | Resignation |
| 9 January 1997 | Molonglo | Rosemary Follett | Labor | Simon Corbell | Labor | Resignation |
| 21 March 1996 | Molonglo | Terry Connolly | Labor | Marion Reilly | Labor | Resignation |

== List of appointments (1989-1995) ==
| Date | Incumbent | Party | Appointee | Party | Cause |
|---|---|---|---|---|---|
| 23 August 1994 | Lou Westende | Liberal | Bill Stefaniak | Liberal | Resignation |
| 1 May 1990 | Paul Whalan | Labor | Terry Connolly | Labor | Resignation |
