= Climate change in the Australian Capital Territory =

Climate change in the Australian Capital Territory affects various environments and industries.

== Greenhouse gas emissions ==
The territory's emissions amounted to 1.42 million tonnes in 2005 compared to 1.28 million tonnes in 2022.

== Impacts of climate change ==
=== Weather extremes ===
Climate change is expected to increase the rate at which bushfires, heatwaves and hail occur in the territory.

== Response ==
=== Policies ===
The ACT government installed solar panels at thousands of social housing properties. In 2024, the Labor Party, the Greens and the Liberals all committed to expanding public transport in Canberra. Transport Canberra implemented an integrated ticketing system.

=== Legislation ===
==== Climate Change and Greenhouse Gas Reduction Act 2010 ====
Climate Change and Greenhouse Gas Reduction Act 2010

Legislative Assembly of the Australian Capital Territory
- Long title: An Act to promote the development of policies and practices to address climate change, to set targets to reduce greenhouse gas emissions and to provide for monitoring and reporting in relation to the targets
- Citation: A2010-41
- Assented to: 2010-11-04

Legislative history
- Bill title: Climate Change and Greenhouse Gas Reduction Bill 2010

Keywords
- emissions targets
- Status: In force

The Climate Change (Greenhouse Gas Emissions Targets) Bill was the first and so far only climate legislative initiative presented by a Liberal Party at the state, territory or federal level. A stronger version of the bill became a part of the coalition deal between the Labor Party and the ACT Greens.

The Act sets targets for emissions reductions compared to 1990 levels as:

- 40% by 2020
- 80% by 2050

The Act required that per capita emissions must have peaked by 30 June 2013.

Under the Act, the ACT Government set an emissions reduction target of 50-60% from 1990 levels by 2025 compared to 1990, as part of its Climate Change Strategy 2019-2025 document.

== See also ==
- Climate change in Australia
