= Meredith Hunter =

Meredith Hunter may refer to:

- Meredith Hunter (politician) (born 1962), Australian politician
- Meredith Hunter (victim) (1951-1969), American man killed during the Altamont Free Concert
