= Caroline Le Couteur =

Australian politician (born 1952)

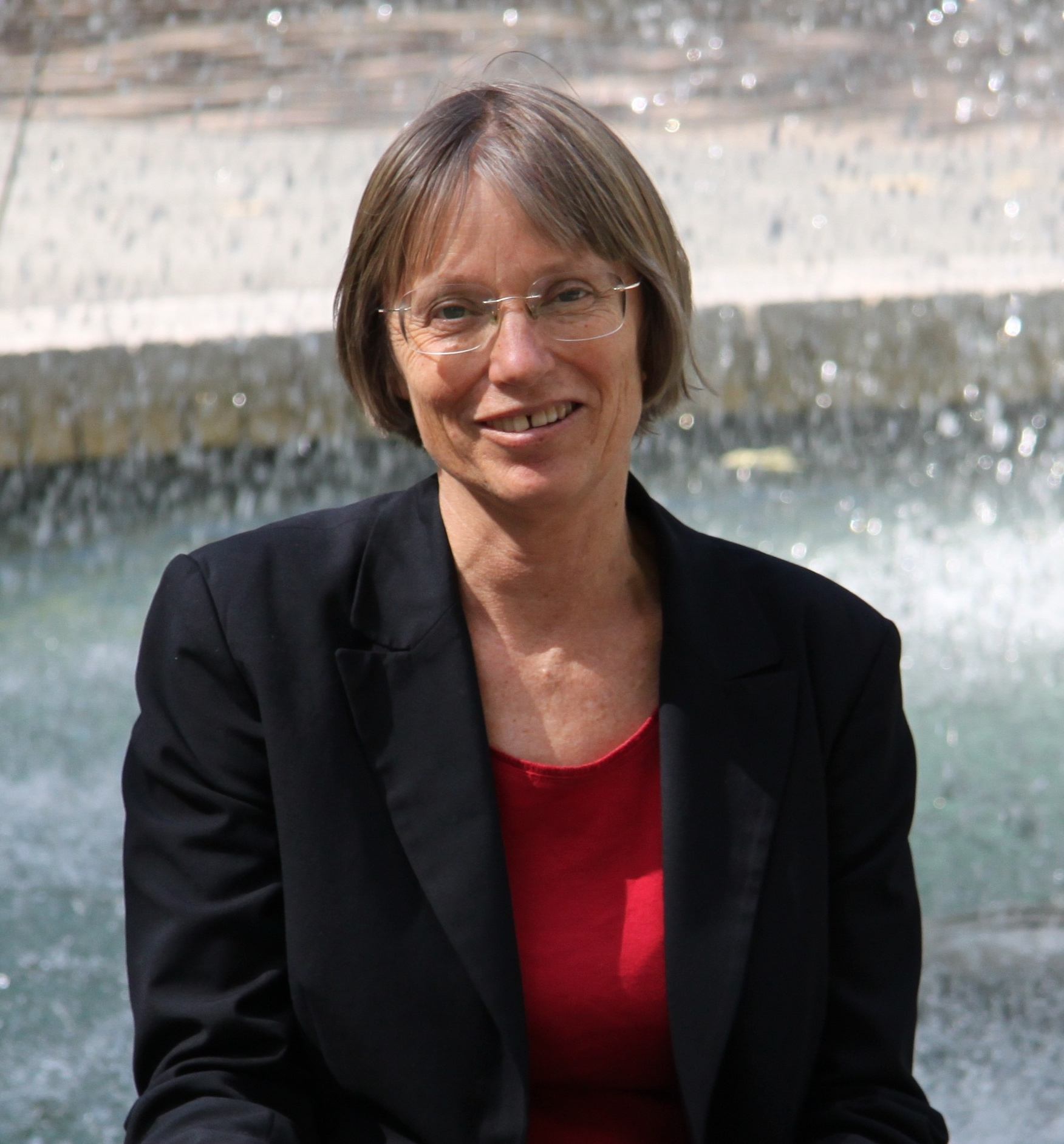
- Le Couter in 2011

Vice President of the Woden Valley Community Council
- Incumbent
- Assumed office 2 July 2025
- President: Nelson Tang

President of Woden Valley Community Council
- In office 6 November 2024 – 2 July 2025
- Preceded by: Fiona Carrick
- Succeeded by: Nelson Tang

Member of the Australian Capital Territory Legislative Assembly for Murrumbidgee
- In office 15 October 2016 – 17 October 2020

Member of the Australian Capital Territory Legislative Assembly for Molonglo
- In office October 2008 – October 2012

Personal details
- Born: 14 April 1952 (age 74) Liverpool, England, United Kingdom
- Party: ACT Greens
- Children: 1
- Parent: Kenneth Le Couteur (father)
- Education: Australian National University
- Occupation: Politician

Caroline Le Couteur (born 14 April 1952) is an Australian politician who has served as Vice President of Woden Valley Community Council since 2025 and previously served as an ACT Greens member of the Australian Capital Territory Legislative Assembly intermittently between 2008 and 2020.

Le Couter was elected to the Australian Capital Territory Legislative Assembly representing the electorate of Molonglo for the ACT Greens at the 2008 election and defeated at the 2012 election In October 2016, she was re-elected to the assembly representing the new electorate of Murrumbidgee, serving a single term until her retirement in 2020.

== Life before election ==
Born in Liverpool, England in 1952, Le Couteur grew up in the Canberra suburb of Yarralumla. Her father was the British physicist Kenneth Le Couteur. She was educated at Telopea Park High School and the Australian National University where she studied economics. She moved to Nimbin after the holding of the Aquarius Festival there in 1973 and stayed there for 11 years. While in Nimbin she was instrumental in forming a pre-school and primary school and became a solar (photovoltaic) panel retailer and installer. She subsequently moved back to Canberra and worked for the federal and territorial governments firstly in information technology and later in renewable energy policy. She later became an executive director of locally based, now ASX listed, company Australian Ethical Investment as well as their information technology manager.

Le Couteur was active in the local environment community. She was at the time of her election one of the two national councillors of the Australian Conservation Foundation (ACF) and had previously been on the ACF's board. She was a keen supporter of groups such as the Australian and New Zealand Solar Energy Society, Pedal Power, Oxfam, Anglicare and the Conservation Council.

== Political career ==
Le Couteur stood for the ACT Greens in the electorate of Molonglo in 1998 supporting the Green incumbent Kerrie Tucker. She remained active in the Greens and stood again in Molonglo in 2008. Before the 2008 election the Greens had one member, Deb Foskey. Prior to the 2008 election polling conducted by Patterson Market Research and published in The Canberra Times suggested the Green vote had significantly increased since the last election at the expense of Labor, with the Liberal vote remaining relatively unchanged. Commentators predicted the Greens would hold the balance of power and decide who forms government. The Greens stated they were willing to court both major parties. At the close of counting on election night, with 82.1 per cent of the vote counted, Labor had obtained 37.6 per cent of the vote across the ACT, with the Liberals at 31.1 per cent and the Greens at 15.8 per cent. Swings were recorded against both the Labor (−9.3 per cent) and Liberal (−3.7 per cent) parties with a +6.6 per cent swing towards the Greens. This resulted in the election of Amanda Bresnan, Meredith Hunter, Shane Rattenbury and Caroline Le Couteur. Le Couteur, Bresnan and Hunter were defeated at the 2012 election.

Le Couteur stood as a candidate for the new Murrumbidgee electorate in the 2016 election, and was successfully re-elected. After being sworn in as a member of the Assembly, Le Couteur was appointed chair of the Parliamentary Planning Committee. During her time in the Assembly, Le Couteur was involved in the passage of legislation committing the ACT to a 'zero emissions by 2050' target and a ban on political donations by the property industry. She announced her retirement from politics ahead of the 2020 election.

=== Post legislative politics ===
In 2024 Le Couter was elected President of the Woden Valley Community Council for the 2025–26 year, succeeding Fiona Carrick who ran for Murrumbidgee in the election that year.

At the organisation's 2025 Annual General Meeting she was elected to vice-president, serving under President Nelson Tang.

== Personal life ==
Le Couteur has described herself as an "ageing hippie" and has admitted to smoking cannabis in her youth, as well as having tried acid.

Le Couteur has dual British-Australian citizenship.
