= Shane Rattenbury =

Australian politician (born 1971)

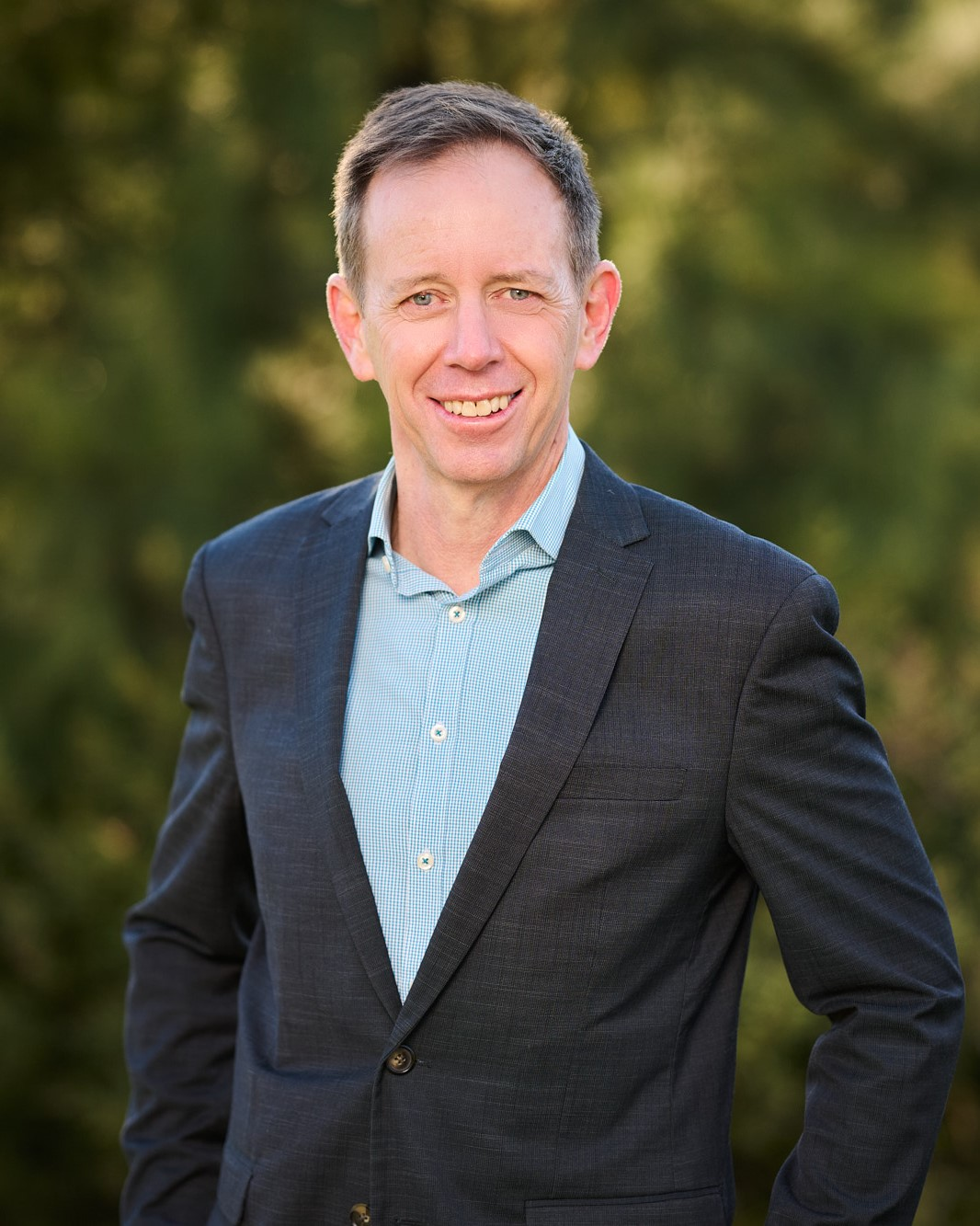
- Rattenbury in 2024

CEO of Lifeline Canberra
- Incumbent
- Assumed office 12 October 2026
- Preceded by: Carrie-Ann Leeson; Adam Miller (as interim CEO)

5th Speaker of the Australian Capital Territory Legislative Assembly
- In office 5 November 2008 – 6 November 2012
- Deputy: Mary Porter
- Preceded by: Wayne Berry
- Succeeded by: Vicki Dunne

Attorney-General of the Australian Capital Territory
- In office 4 November 2020 – 7 November 2024
- Chief Minister: Andrew Barr
- Preceded by: Gordon Ramsay
- Succeeded by: Tara Cheyne

Minister for Climate Change and Sustainability
- In office 15 October 2016 – 4 November 2020
- Chief Minister: Andrew Barr
- Preceded by: Position established
- Succeeded by: Andrew Barr

Leader of the ACT Greens
- In office 20 October 2012 – 15 May 2026
- Deputy: Rebecca Vassarotti (2024); Jo Clay (2024–2026)
- Preceded by: Meredith Hunter
- Succeeded by: Jo Clay

Member of the Australian Capital Territory Legislative Assembly
- In office 18 October 2008 – 15 May 2026
- Preceded by: Deb Foskey
- Succeeded by: Rebecca Vassarotti
- Constituency: Molonglo (2008–2016); Kurrajong (2016–2026)
Other Ministerial roles (11)
Minister for Consumer Affairs
In office 4 November 2020 – 7 November 2024
Chief Minister	Andrew Barr
Minister for Water, Energy and Emissions Reduction
In office 4 November 2020 – 7 November 2024
Chief Minister	Andrew Barr
Succeeded by	Suzanne Orr (Note: As Minister for Climate Change, Environment, Energy and Water.)
Minister for Gaming
In office 4 November 2020 – 7 November 2024
Chief Minister	Andrew Barr
Succeeded by	Marisa Paterson (Note: As Minister for Gaming Reform.)
Minister for Corrections and Justice Health
In office November 2012 – October 2020
Chief Minister	Katy Gallagher; Andrew Barr
Preceded by	Chris Bourke (Note: As Minister for Corrections.)
Succeeded by	Emma Davidson
Minister for Justice, Consumer Affairs and Road Safety
In office November 2012 – October 2020
Chief Minister	Katy Gallagher; Andrew Barr
Preceded by	New portfolio
Succeeded by	Portfolio abolished
Minister for Mental Health
In office November 2016 – October 2020
Chief Minister	Andrew Barr
Preceded by	New portfolio
Succeeded by	Emma Davidson
Minister for Education
In office January 2016 – October 2016
Chief Minister	Andrew Barr
Preceded by	Joy Burch (Note: As Minister for Education and Training.)
Succeeded by	Yvette Berry (Note: as Minister for Education and Early Childhood Development)
Minister for Road Safety
In office January 2016 – October 2016
Chief Minister	Andrew Barr
Preceded by	Mick Gentleman (Note: As Minister for Roads and Parking.)
Succeeded by	Himself (Note: As Minister for Justice, Consumer Affairs and Road Safety.)
Minister assisting the Chief Minister on Transport Reform
In office January 2015 – January 2016
Chief Minister	Andrew Barr
Minister for Sport and Recreation
In office July 2014 – 22 January 2016
Chief Minister	Katy Gallagher; Andrew Barr
Preceded by	Andrew Barr
Succeeded by	Yvette Berry

Personal details
- Born: 25 August 1971 (age 55) Batemans Bay, New South Wales, Australia
- Party: Greens (since 1992)
- Domestic partner: Louise Bilston
- Education: Australian National University (BEc, LLB)
- Occupation: Politician
- Cabinet: Rattenbury I; II; III; IV
- Website: greens.org.au/act/person/shane-rattenbury

Shane Stephen Rattenbury (born 25 August 1971) is an Australian former politician currently serving as the CEO of Lifeline Canberra. He previously served as a member of the Australian Capital Territory Legislative Assembly from 2008 to 2026 where he held various ministerial portfolios from 2012 to 2024. A member of the ACT Greens, he served as party leader from 2012 to 2026 and led the party into coalition governments with the territory Labor Party for three terms.

Rattenburry ran as a candidate for the ACT Greens in several elections before succeeding in the seven-member electorate of Molonglo in 2008 where he served until it was abolished in 2016. He successfully ran in the new five-member electorate of Kurrajong and comfortably held the seat for the rest of his time in politics. In his first term in parliament, Rattenbury was elected Speaker of the Assembly, and was the first Speaker in any parliament in the world representing a Green political party.

Following the 2012 territory election, Rattenbury was left as the sole Greens MLA and sole crossbencher, being the kingmaker for the next government. He ultimately supported Katy Gallagher of Labor and formed the first Labor–Greens coalition government in mainland Australia, and to date the only one in the country to last for more than a single term. Rattenbury served as minister responsible for non-Attorney-General justice portfolios in the Second Gallagher ministry. In the First Barr ministry, Rattenbury took on further portfolio responsibilities including working on Transport Reform and Sports and Recreation.

At the 2016 election, the Greens gained a second seat and the coalition was renewed with Rattenbury elevated to more senior ministerial portfolios including Climate Change and Sustainability, Education, and Mental Health. He led the ACT Greens to their best ever election result in 2020, winning six seats. He was joined in the Fourth Barr ministry by two other Greens ministers for the first time. Among other new portfolios, he was elevated to the Attorney-General ministry, the highest ranking ministry a Greens MP has ever held in Australia.

Following the 2024 election where the Greens lost two seats to independents, the party moved back to cross-bench, supporting a minority Labor government under a confidence and supply agreement. Over the 2025–2026 parliamentary Summer break, he controversially undertook discussions with the Canberra Liberals about the feasibility and prospect of a Greens–Liberal government as a way to address issues relating to the ACT's "forever Labor government". The discussions did not amount to any change of government, but did spark membership backlash within the Greens.

On 20 April 2026, Rattenbury announced his retirement from politics after 17 years. He resigned on 15 May 2026, triggering a countback in Kurrajong and a leadership ballot. His deputy Jo Clay succeeded him as leader.

== Early life, education and career before politics ==
Rattenbury first moved to Canberra in 1984. He attended Canberra Grammar School and went on to gain a BEc and LLB(Honours) from the Australian National University and commenced employment, working with the Australian Government Department of Industry, Science and Tourism. Prior to his election to the Assembly, Rattenbury travelled between Amsterdam and Australia as the International Political Director of Greenpeace International. During this time, he gained publicity for his work on global campaigns on climate change and whaling.

== Political career ==
In the 1996 federal election, Rattenbury was the Greens candidate for the newly created Division of Namadgi in the southern suburbs of Canberra. He came in 3rd with 7.22% of the primary vote.

Rattenbury stood for the ACT Greens in the 1998 Australian Capital Territory election in the seat of Ginninderra, attracting 1896 primary votes, or 3.76% of the formal vote, and narrowly missing winning the electorate's fifth seat on preferences behind the Osborne Independent Group's Dave Rugendyke.

Rattenbury again stood for election to the ACT Legislative Assembly at the 2001 ACT election, as a candidate in the electorate of Ginninderra for the ACT Greens. After the distribution of preferences, Rattenbury was defeated by both Labor's Wayne Berry and the Australian Democrats' Roslyn Dundas.

In June 2008, the ACT Greens announced that Rattenbury would again stand as a candidate for election in the electorate of Molonglo. Independent polling released in October suggested the Green vote had doubled since the last election at the expense of Labor, with the Liberal vote remaining relatively unchanged. Commentators predicted the Greens would hold the balance of power and decide who forms government. The Greens stated they were willing to court both major parties. With 82.1 per cent of the vote counted, Labor had obtained 37.6 per cent of the vote, with the Liberals at 31.1 per cent and the Greens at 15.8 per cent. Swings were recorded against both Labor (−9.3 per cent) and the Liberals (−3.7 per cent) with a +6.6 per cent swing towards the Greens, resulting in the election of Rattenbury, Meredith Hunter, Amanda Bresnan, and Caroline Le Couteur.

=== Parliamentary career and election as Speaker ===
After deliberations with both the Labor and Liberal parties, the Greens chose to support a Labor minority government. Hunter was a key negotiator of the Parliamentary Agreement between the ACT Greens and the Labor Party. Under the agreement, the Greens secured a range of policy outcomes in the areas of schools and education, health service provision, housing, public transport and gay rights. It also ensures that the Greens will Chair three of the Assembly's key committees. In exchange, the Greens agreed to maintain confidence in Chief Minister, Jon Stanhope. The Greens also secured Government support for the nomination of Rattenbury as Assembly Speaker. While on the cross bench in the 7th Assembly, Rattenbury was Greens spokesperson in the portfolios of Attorney-General, Environment, Climate Change and Water, Energy, Police and Emergency Services, Tourism, Sport and Recreation.

=== Ministerial roles ===
Following the 2012 ACT election, Rattenbury was the only Greens MLA to retain his seat in the Assembly. With the election resulting in a hung parliament, Rattenbury, who held the balance of power, announced he would support Katy Gallagher and the Labor Party in the formation of government. The ACT Labor Caucus agreed to appoint Rattenbury as a minister in Gallagher's five-member cabinet, and to support 100 Greens policies. Rattenbury served as the ACT Minister for Ageing, Minister for Housing, Minister for Corrections, Minister for Aboriginal and Torres Strait Islander Affairs, as well as, Minister for Territory and Municipal Services in the Second Gallagher Ministry and the First Barr Ministry.

Rattenbury was re-elected at the 2016 ACT election. Following the election, Rattenbury was joined by party colleague Caroline Le Couteur in the Legislative Assembly, taking the Greens tally to 2 out of 25 total seats in the Assembly. Rattenbury subsequently struck a deal with the minority Labor Government to retain a place in the cabinet as the Minister for Climate Change and Sustainability, Minister for Justice, Consumer Affairs and Road Safety, Minister for Corrections, and Minister for Mental Health. Although a member of the Barr government, he reserved the right to withdraw from Cabinet discussions on divisive issues and vote independently in the Assembly.

Re-elected again at the 2020 ACT election with six Greens elected to the then 25 member Assembly, the Greens negotiated a Parliamentary and Governing Agreement with Labor which saw three Greens enter the Ministry. Rattenbury held the portfolios of Attorney-General, Minister for Water, Energy and Emissions Reduction, Minister for Gaming and Minister for Consumer Affairs in the Third Barr ministry.

== Personal life ==
In 2019, Rattenbury admitted that he had tried the drug MDMA once in his 20s.

Rattenbury is in a relationship with project manager Louise Bilston.

== Electoral history ==
Year	Electorate	Party	First preference result					Result at exclusion/election				Result
Year	Electorate	Party	Votes	%	±%	Quota	Position	Votes	%	±%	Position	Result
1996	Namadgi	ACT Greens	4,579	7.22	▲7.22	N/A	Third					Not elected
1997	Australian Capital Territory (Constitutional Convention election)	ACT Greens	379	0.36	▲0.36	0.01	Eighteenth					Not elected
1998	Ginninderra	ACT Greens	1,896	3.76	▼1.10	0.23	Eighth					Not elected
2001	Ginninderra	ACT Greens	3,045	5.47	▲1.71	0.33	Fourth					Not elected
2008	Molonglo	ACT Greens	9,564	10.8	▲6.17	0.87	Third					Elected
2012	Molonglo	ACT Greens	4,966	5.4	▼5.4	0.43	Fifth					Elected
2016	Kurrajong	ACT Greens	6,307	12.9	▲6.1	0.77	Second					Elected
2020	Kurrajong	ACT Greens	6,388	12.6	▼0.3	0.76	Second					Elected
2024	Kurrajong	ACT Greens	4,087	8.4	▼4.2	0.50	Third				Fourth	Elected

== See also ==
- 2008 Australian Capital Territory election
- Members of the Australian Capital Territory Legislative Assembly, 2008–2012

== Notes ==
Australian Capital Territory Legislative Assembly
Preceded by Wayne Berry	Speaker of the ACT Legislative Assembly; 2008–2012	Succeeded by Vicki Dunne
Preceded by Electorate established	Member of the Legislative Assembly for Kurrajong; 2016–present Served alongside: Barr, Stephen-Smith, Lee, Doszpot/Burch/Vassarotti/Emerson	Succeeded by TBD
Preceded by Deb Foskey	Member of the Legislative Assembly for Molonglo; 2012–2016; Served alongside: Corbell, Barr, Gallagher, Hanson, Seselja/Doszpot, Le Couteur/Jones	Succeeded by Electorate abolished
Party political offices
Preceded by Meredith Hunter	Leader of the ACT Greens; 2012–2026	Succeeded by Jo Clay
Political offices
New office	Minister for Climate Change; 2016–2020	Succeeded by Andrew Barr
Legal offices
Preceded by Gordon Ramsay	Attorney-General of the Australian Capital Territory; 2020–2024	Succeeded by Tara Cheyne
