= Jo Clay =

Australian politician (born 1977)

Jo Clay MLA
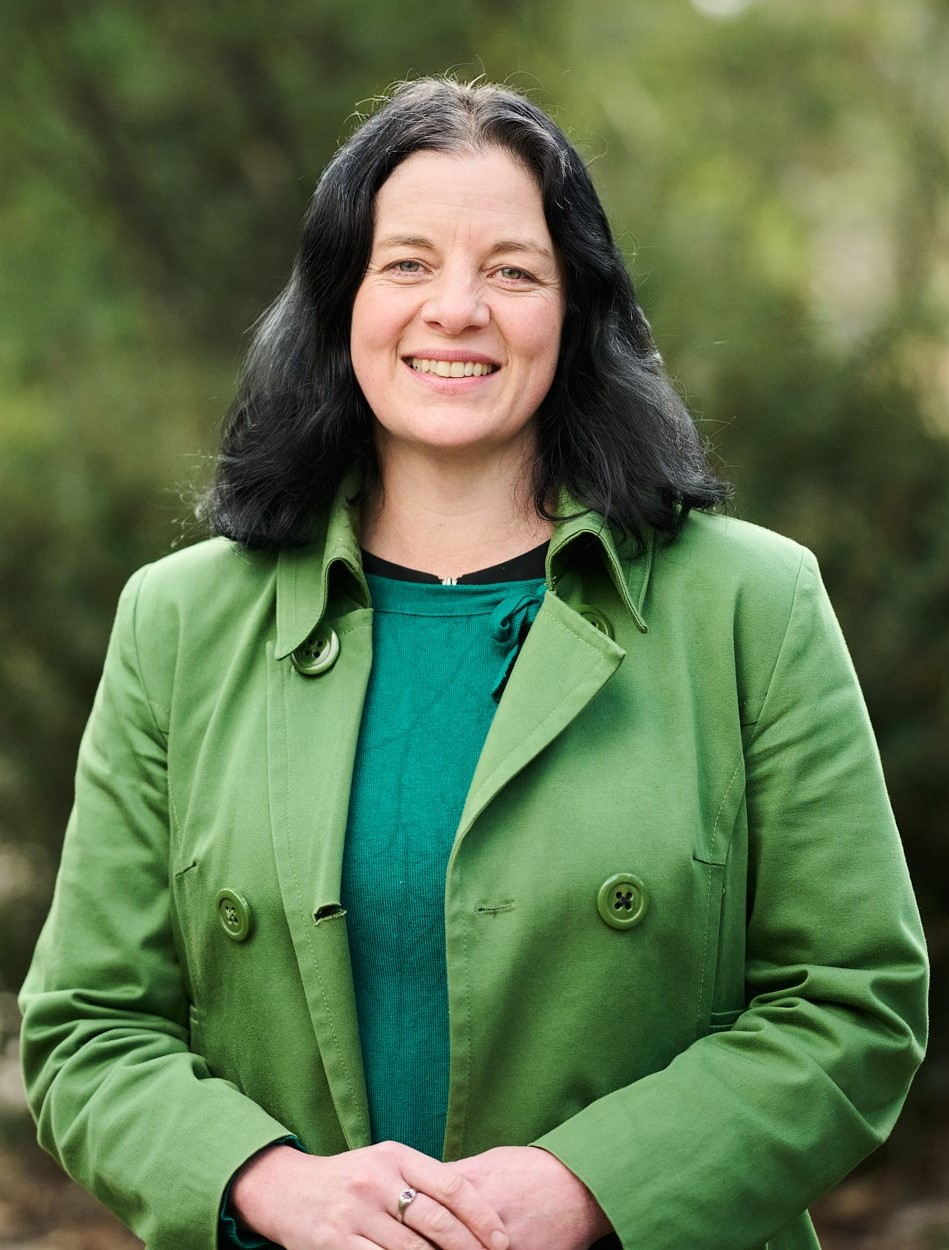
- Clay in 2024

Leader of the ACT Greens
- Incumbent
- Assumed office 15 May 2026 (Note: While Clay was declared elected on 29 June 2026 after a members leadership ballot, she has officially held the office in its full capacity since Shane Rattenbury's resignation from the ACT Legislative Assembly on 15 May 2026.)
- Deputy: Andrew Braddock
- Preceded by: Shane Rattenbury

Deputy Leader of the ACT Greens
- In office 19 December 2024 – 15 May 2026
- Leader: Shane Rattenbury
- Preceded by: Rebecca Vassarotti
- Succeeded by: Andrew Braddock

Member of the Australian Capital Territory Legislative Assembly for Ginninderra
- Incumbent
- Assumed office 17 October 2020
- Preceded by: Gordon Ramsay

Personal details
- Born: 7 February 1977 (age 49) Weetangera, Australian Capital Territory, Australia
- Party: ACT Greens
- Education: University of Wollongong (LLB)
- Cabinet: Clay frontbench
- Committees: Fiscal Sustainability (Chair); Environment & Planning (Chair)
- Portfolio: Finance; Environment; Arts & the Nighttime Economy; Planning & Urban Renewal; Circular Economy & Waste; Animal Welfare; Heritage

Joanne T. Clay (born 1977) is an Australian politician serving as Leader of the ACT Greens and a member of the Australian Capital Territory Legislative Assembly for Ginninderra since 2020. Clay was previously the ACT Greens Deputy Leader from 2024 until Shane Rattenbury's retirement in May 2026.

== Early life and career ==
Clay grew up in Canberra and attended Weetangera Primary and Radford College in Canberra. She went on to complete a Bachelor of Law and a Bachelor of Creative Arts at the University of Wollongong and a year on exchange at University of Colorado, Boulder.

Clay was a writer in the 2000s and early 2010s, developing and publishing the RomZomCom A Single Girl's Guide to the Zombie Apocalypse which won Marion's Olvar Wood Fellowship Award.

Prior to entering politics, Clay worked in various companies focused on improving the environment, including setting up Send and Shred, a company that recycles shredded documents, and The Carbon Diet about reducing her carbon footprint.

== Political career ==
=== First Term ===
At the 2020 Australian Capital Territory election Clay won one of the five seats in Ginninderra, unseating Labor MLA Gordon Ramsay.

During that term, Clay was responsible for the spokesperson portfolios of Transport, Active Travel, Parks and Conservation, Animal Welfare, Arts and Culture, Circular Economy, Science, and Women.

=== Second term ===
Clay retained her seat at the 2024 election. Following the election, she nominated for the position of ACT Greens after Rebecca Vassarotti, the incumbent Deputy Leader, lost her seat. Clay was elected by a ballot of the party general membership, running unopposed but still requiring a majority support vote to take office.

Clay is responsible for the spokesperson portfolios of Planning & Urban Renewal, Environment, Circular Economy & Waste, Arts & the Nighttime Economy, Animal Welfare, Heritage, and Finance.

== Key advocacy and achievements ==
=== Climate and environment ===
Clay has been a tireless advocate for Climate and the Environment.

In 2021 she compelled the ACT Government to sign the Fossil Fuel Non-Proliferation Treaty, with all Greens MLAs and Ministers Barr, Berry, Cheyne and Steel from Labor also signing in their own right. Notably, following the 2024 election, new Minister for Climate Change Suzanne Orr did not sign the treaty.

=== Fossil Fuel Ad Ban ===
In 2024 Clay introduced a bill that would ban fossil fuel companies from advertising in ACT Government owned sports facilities. Senator David Pocock welcomed the bill but Labor refused to support it.

=== City Limits ===
==== Bluetts Block ====
After years of campaigning by community groups Friends of Bluetts Block and Clay, in 2025 the ACT Government amended the Territory Plan to designate Bluetts Block as a nature reserve.

Clay welcomed this win for the community but wanted to further protect the western edge so brought a motion to the ACT Legislative Assembly, which was passed, calling on the ACT Government to set an urban growth boundary this term of government, setting a hard edge on Canberra’s urban sprawl.

==== Dragons ====
Clay has campaigned against developments that push the critically endangered Canberra Grasslands Earless Dragons further towards extinction. The species which is at risk of becoming Australia's first mainland extinction since colonisation. One of Federal Environment Minister Watt’s first actions after being re-elected in 2025 was to approve a road destroying Canberra Grasslands Earless Dragon habitat. The Commissioner for Sustainability and the Environment has announced an inquiry into this decision.

=== Local issues ===
==== Belco Busway ====
In 2023 Clay worked with Liberal MLA Mark Parton to pass a motion urging the government to undertake a feasibility study to complete the Belconnen transitway.

==== Belconnen school ====
Clay has long lobbied the ACT government to commit to building a new school for the rapidly developing Belconnen Town Centre, which is located in her electorate of Ginninderra.

In May 2024 she secured tri-partisan commitment to her parliamentary motion for a new primary and secondary school for the Belconnen Town Centre. . The ACT Labor Government has yet to deliver the school.

==== Freestanding Birth Centre ====
In 2023 Clay tabled a petition of over 3000 signatures calling for a Freestanding Birth Centre for Canberra and secured government commitment to undertake a feasibility study. Following the study, it has been announced that there will be an alongside birth centre as part of the new Northside Hospital.

==== Big Splash ====
In 2024–2025 Clay led a community campaign to save local water park, Big Splash. She sponsored a petition calling on the government to keep the facility open for the summer and guarantee that the zoning would remain recreational.

In May 2025, Clay moved a private member’s motion which passed unanimously committing the government to not rezone the site and for the site to remain zoned for community recreation.

== Electoral history ==
Year	Electorate	Party	First preference result					Result at exclusion/election				Result
Year	Electorate	Party	Votes	%	±%	Quota	Position	Votes	%	Quota	Position	Result
2020	Ginninderra	ACT Greens	3,495	6.2	▲6.2	0.37	Fifth	9,937	17.7	1.06	Fourth	Elected
2024	Ginninderra	ACT Greens	3,426	6.1	▼0.1	0.37	Fifth	9,399	16.8	1.01	Fourth	Elected

== Awards ==
Year	Nominee / work	Award	Result	Ref
2008	A Single Girl's Guide to the Zombie Apocalypse	Hachette Queensland Writers Centre Manuscript Development Award	Won	
2010	A Single Girl's Guide to the Zombie Apocalypse	Olvar Wood Fellowship Award	Won	
2019	Send and Shred	Australian Information Industry Association Merit iAward	Won	
