= Australian Ethical Investment =

Australian public company

Australian Ethical Limited
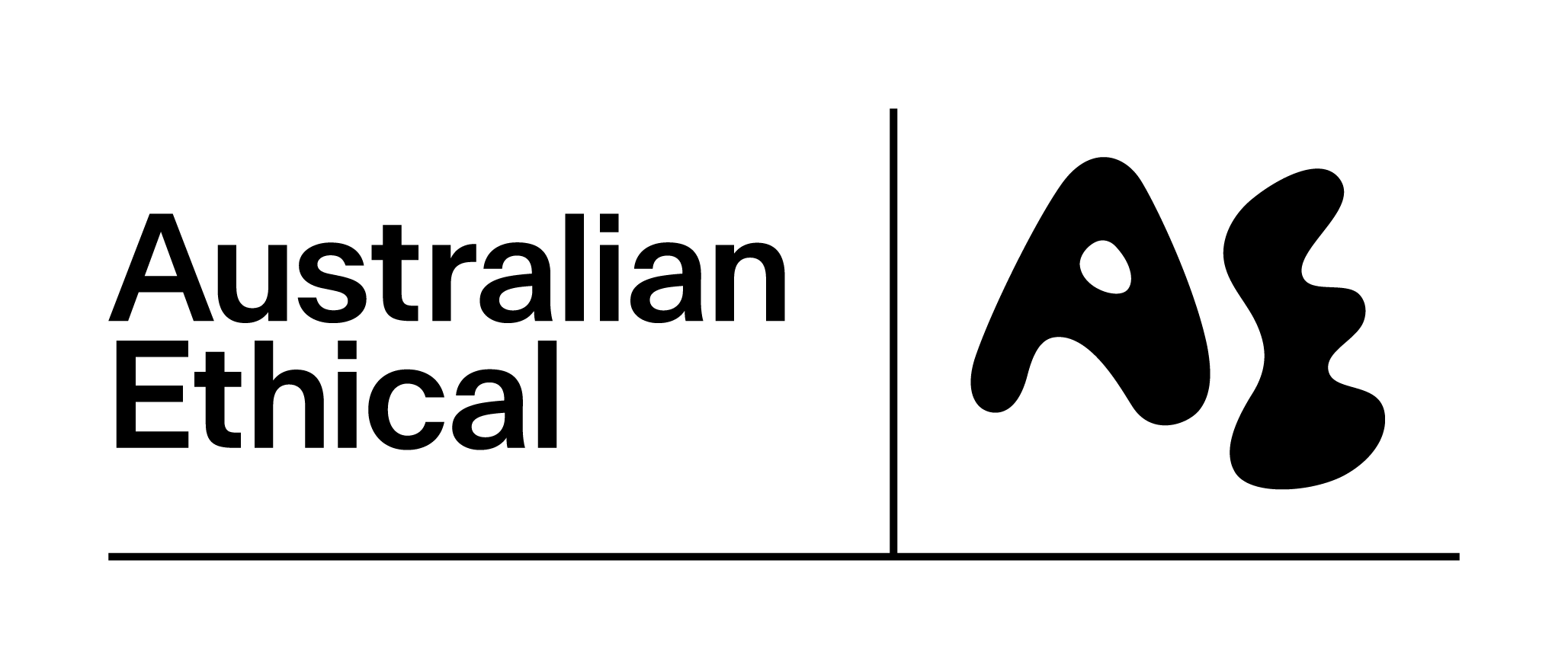
- Type: Public
- Traded as: ASX: AEF
- Industry: Financial Services
- Founded: 1986; 40 years ago
- Headquarters: 130 Pitt St, Sydney, Australia
- Key people: John McMurdo (CEO); Mark Simons (CFO) Ludovic Theau (CIO)
- Products: Superannuation, Pensions, Managed funds, SMA, ETF
- Revenue: A$100.5 million (Y.E. 30 June 2024)
- AUM: ▲ A$14.28 billion (2025)
- Number of employees: 100+
- Website: australianethical.com.au

Australian Ethical is an ethical investment management company, listed on the ASX, and based in Sydney, Australia.

== History ==
Australian Ethical was founded in 1986, and since then, has been providing investors with investment management products that align with their values and provide returns aligned to the objectives of each fund. All investments are guided by the Australian Ethical Charter which shapes its ethical approach and underpins both its culture and its vision.

On 17 Dec 2002 Australian Ethical was listed on the Australian Stock Exchange (ASX) as AEF.

In 2014 the company became a founding B Corporation (B Corp) in Australia and the first listed B Corp in the region. It was awarded the B Corp "Best for the World" ranking it in the top 5% of B Corps globally (in the corresponding size group) in various categories in the years 2015–2019 and 2021–2022. As at 13 July 2023, the ethical investment manager became the highest scoring Certified B Corp in Australia and Aotearoa New Zealand after achieving a recertification score of 168.5, more than double the score required to gain certification.

On 25 November 2022, Australian Ethical successfully completed the successor fund transfer (SFT) of Christian Super into Australian Ethical bolstering customer numbers and FUM. Australian Ethical also inherited Christian Super’s impact investing portfolio which became available to non-super investors for the first time through its multi-asset managed fund options. Post the SFT, Australian Ethical continues to operate solely under the Australian Ethical brand.

As at 30 September 2025, Australian Ethical has $14.28 billion in funds under management and more than 134,000 clients (managed fund investors and funded superannuation members).

== Products and services ==
Australian Ethical is a pure-play ethical investment manager, only offering ethical funds across Australian Equities, International Equities and Multi-asset funds. It offers seven superannuation and six pension options to its members as well as fifteen managed funds options, an SMA and an ETF product.

Australian Ethical was one of the first superannuation companies in Australia to sell super directly to customers using a digital marketing approach, and now also sells managed funds directly, as well as through a network of advisers and private wealth firms. They also have a small institutional business providing managed funds to organisations, largely not-for-profit and values-aligned.

Their ethical investing approach aims to:

- Give investors access to ethically screened portfolios of companies and other investments which are more aligned with their values than market portfolios.
- Influence progress towards a better future for people, animals and the environment by engaging with select companies to improve key business practices.
- Help them identify, understand and manage investment risk and opportunity, at a company, portfolio and systemic level.

Their investment process involves:

- Ethical assessment – the in-house Ethical Research team assess possible investments according to the 23 principles of the Ethical Charter, using the contemporary decision frameworks (and criteria) that bring these to life. This process identifies companies that Australian Ethical believe can influence progress towards a better future for people, animals and the environment and restricts those that they believe aren’t; and this research defines their universe of potential ethical investments.
- Investment analysis and construction – Australian Ethical’s investment team then constructs portfolios suitable for the investment strategies and return objectives of funds and options. Their investment strategy results in equity and multi-asset funds that are overweight versus benchmark in renewables, technology and healthcare with on average 4.1x more investment in renewable energy than the benchmark.
- Ethical stewardship – The ethics research team also monitors investee companies and engage to influence companies, governments and others as an important part of the process. As an investor they can encourage companies to create more positive impact and avoid negative impact in different ways – sometimes a simple discussion with management works. But they can also encourage change by:
  - voting for changes to directors and executive remuneration more aligned with sustainable business strategies
  - collaborating with other investors to signal shared expectations for more responsible business practices
  - voting against a merger or a demerger proposal
  - publicly questioning company decisions at AGMs and through the media, including through proposing and supporting shareholder resolutions.
  - Divestment, and the threat of divestment, is another tool. If done at scale it can affect a company’s cost of capital, making it less competitive than its more sustainable competitors. If done publicly, it can impact a company’s reputation. It can also create market signals that help influence broader change
- Australian Ethical’s stewardship includes strategic action for change on a small number of priority issues which have included:
  - Stopping finance and insurance helping expand the fossil fuel sector
  - Reducing harm to animals from animal testing and research
  - Stopping livestock driven deforestation in Australia
  - Reducing emissions from high emissions building products.

== Community giving ==
Every year, Australian Ethical donates 10% of profits (after tax and before bonus) to the Australian Ethical Foundation to unearth and fund high impact charities driving solutions addressing climate change. Since 2000, Australian Ethical has paid out over $13 million in grants.
