= Andrew Braddock (politician) =

Australian politician (born 1978)

Andrew Braddock MLA
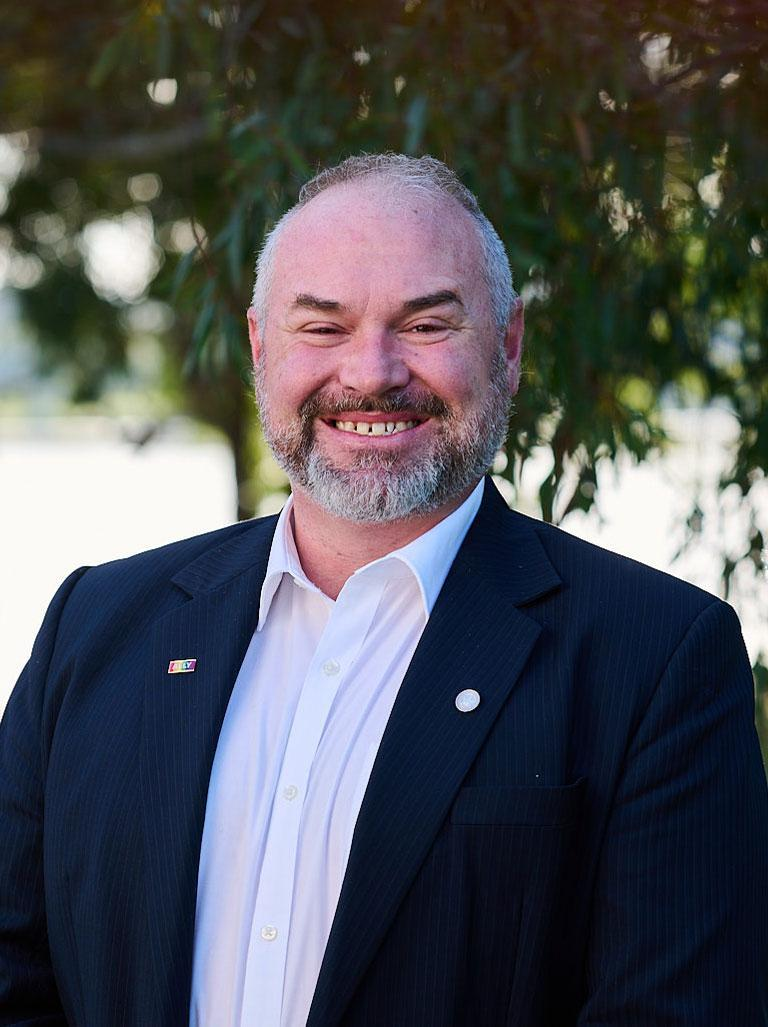

Deputy Leader of the ACT Greens
- Incumbent
- Assumed office 29 June 2026
- Leader: Jo Clay
- Preceded by: Jo Clay

Deputy Speaker of the Australian Capital Territory Legislative Assembly
- Incumbent
- Assumed office 6 November 2024
- Speaker: Mark Parton; Jeremy Hanson
- Preceded by: Mark Parton

Member of the Australian Capital Territory Legislative Assembly for Yerrabi
- Incumbent
- Assumed office 17 October 2020
- Preceded by: Deepak-Raj Gupta

Acting Speaker of the Australian Capital Territory Legislative Assembly
- In office 10 November 2025 – 2 December 2025
- Preceded by: Mark Parton
- Succeeded by: Jeremy Hanson

Personal details
- Born: 26 January 1978 (age 48) Brisbane, Queensland, Australia
- Party: ACT Greens
- Children: 2
- Education: Griffith University (BEnvEng); UNSW (MoMS)
- Committees: Transport and City Services; Integrity Commission & Statutory Office Holders; Estimates 2026–2027; Financial Management & Government Procurement Legislative Compliance
- Portfolio: Transport; Climate Change Adaptation; Democracy, Integrity, & Public Service Transformation; Municipal Services; Emergency Services; Veterans; Multicultural Affairs; Carers

Andrew Duncan Braddock (born 1978) is an Australian politician. A member of the ACT Greens, he is a member of the unicameral Australian Capital Territory Legislative Assembly representing the multi-member electorate of Yerrabi since 2020 and has served as the party's deputy leader since 2026. Braddock has also been Deputy Speaker of the Legislative Assembly since 2024.

== Early life, education and career before politics ==
Braddock was born in Brisbane, Queensland, to social worker and maths professor parents in 1978.

Braddock graduated from Griffith University with a Bachelor of Environmental Engineering (Honours) and moved to Canberra in 2002 to join the Public Service. He went on to obtain a Masters of Management Studies from the University of New South Wales.

Braddock was a public servant and environmental engineer.

== Political career ==
Braddock stood for election to the ACT Legislative Assembly at the 2016 ACT Election as a candidate for the ACT Greens in the new electorate of Yerrabi. The Greens were unsuccessful in winning a seat in Yerrabi obtaining 7.1 per cent of the vote. In 2019, he ran for The Greens in the Federal election for the Seat of Fenner where he obtained 14.42 per cent of the vote, a swing to The Greens of 1.42 per cent. Braddock stood as the ACT Greens lead candidate for Yerrabi for 2020 ACT election and secured a seat with primary vote of 10.2 per cent (a swing to the Greens of 3.1%).

== Parliamentary career ==
Braddock is the Deputy Speaker of the Legislative Assembly and ACT Greens spokesperson for Multicultural Affairs, Transport, Democracy, Integrity, and Public Service Transformation, Emergency Services, Veterans, Municipal Services, and Carers.

Braddock was Acting Speaker from 10 November to 2 December 2025 when the incumbent speaker Mark Parton resigned following his election to Canberra Liberals leadership. Jeremy Hanson was elected the new Speaker on 2 December 2025 when the assembly next sat.

== Personal life ==
Braddock has twin daughters and two dogs.

In 2013, Braddock's first child Connor Jack Braddock was stillborn.

Braddock is a self-described introvert.
