= Meredith Hunter (politician) =

Australian politician

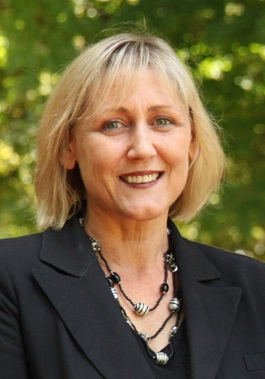

Leader of the ACT Greens
- In office October 2008 – 20 October 2012
- Preceded by: Deb Foskey
- Succeeded by: Shane Rattenbury

Member of the ACT Legislative Assembly
- In office 18 October 2008 – 20 October 2012 Serving with Stanhope, Dunne, Coe, Porter
- Preceded by: Wayne Berry
- Succeeded by: Yvette Berry
- Constituency: Ginninderra

Personal details
- Born: 22 July 1962 (age 64) Canberra, ACT
- Party: Greens
- Relations: Mary Steel Stevenson (grandmother)
- Children: 3 sons
- Education: Australian National University
- Occupation: Politician

Meredith Hunter (born 22 July 1962) is an Australian former politician who was a member of the multi-member unicameral Australian Capital Territory Legislative Assembly representing the electorate of Ginninderra for the ACT Greens from 2008 to 2012. She was also the Parliamentary Convenor of the ACT Greens.

== Early life and background ==
Hunter (née Stevenson) was born in Canberra to John and Judy Stevenson. Her grandmother, Mary Steel Stevenson, was the first woman elected to the ACT Advisory Council and was president of the Liberal Party's ACT Women's Branch. She was educated at the Australian National University and was later made an Adjunct Professional Associate at the University of Canberra.

Hunter had a high profile in the community sector prior to her election. She began her career as a youth worker in Canberra and went on to become a prominent youth affairs advocate. She was the director of the Youth Coalition of the ACT for over ten years and held executive positions with a number of national peak bodies, including the Australian Youth Affairs Coalition and National Shelter. Hunter was also a vocal spokesperson on community sector viability and social welfare issues, serving on the Board of the ACT Council of Social Service and as Chairwoman of ACT Shelter. Notably, Hunter was appointed Chair of the Youth Homelessness Strategy and Chair of Anti-Poverty Week. In 2008, she was given a Lifetime Achievement Award by the Youth Coalition for her contribution to children and young people.

== Political career: 2004 - 2008 ==
=== Early candidature ===
Hunter first ran for election for the electorate of Ginninderra in the 2004 ACT general election representing the ACT Greens. She significantly outperformed ACT Labor Party candidates Mary Porter and Wayne Berry in primary votes, though they went on to defeat her after the distribution of preferences. She ran as a candidate for election to the House of Representatives representing the electorate of Fraser for the Australian Greens in the 2007 federal election. Hunter achieved a swing of 2.1% towards the Greens, however was unsuccessful in defeating sitting Labor member, Bob McMullan. The candidature of Hunter and Amanda Bresnan for the House of Representatives was part of an extensive campaign in the ACT to elect Kerrie Tucker and end coalition control of the Australian Senate immediately after the election, as territory Senators take their place at this time as opposed to their state counterparts in the following July. The ACT holds two seats with only three-year terms, so a larger quota than normal is required for election. Despite a swing of 5.1 percent to the Greens on 21.5 percent, their best result in any state or territory, the party fell narrowly short.

=== ACT election campaign ===
In June 2008, the ACT Greens announced that Hunter would again stand for election, again in Ginninderra, at the upcoming election. Independent polling released in October suggested the Green vote had doubled to tripled since the last election at the expense of Labor, with the Liberal vote remaining relatively unchanged. Commentators predicted the Greens would hold the balance of power and decide who forms government. The Greens stated they were willing to court both major parties. At the close of counting on election night, with 82.1 per cent of the vote counted, Labor had obtained 37.6 per cent of the vote across the ACT, with the Liberals at 31.1 per cent and the Greens at 15.8 per cent. Swings were recorded against both the Labor (-9.3 per cent) and Liberal (-3.7 per cent) parties with a +6.6 per cent swing towards the Greens. This resulted in the election of Hunter, Bresnan, Shane Rattenbury and Caroline Le Couteur.

== Parliamentary career ==
=== Formation of government ===
After deliberations with both the Labor and Liberal parties, the Greens chose to support a Labor minority government. Hunter was a key negotiator of the Parliamentary Agreement between the ACT Greens and the Labor Party. Under the agreement, the Greens secured a range of policy outcomes in the areas of schools and education, health service provision, housing, public transport and gay rights. It also ensures that the Greens will Chair three of the Assembly's key committees. In exchange, the Greens agreed to maintain confidence in Chief Minister, Jon Stanhope. The Greens also secured Government support for the nomination of Rattenbury as Speaker of the Assembly. The agreement between the ACT Greens and ACT Labor requires the Government to report on progress against the measures outlined in the agreement on an annual basis. The first joint communiqué on the progress of the agreement was issued in July 2008. The next communiqué was due to be issued in July 2010.

=== ACT Greens leader ===
Prior to the negotiation of the agreement, Hunter was appointed Parliamentary Convenor of the ACT Greens, a role equivalent to that of a Parliamentary Party Leader, and was party spokesperson for the portfolios of Treasury, Community Services, Education, Women and Children and Young People. Hunter has been visible in the media on issues surrounding education and literacy and ACT finances. Hunter was supportive of the 2009-10 ACT Budget where it progressed measures outlined in the parliamentary agreement, but signaled the Greens' concerns about the size of the budget deficit. Most commentators agreed that the Budget was a victory for the Greens. She has also been a vocal critic of the federal government's intervention in the ACT's same sex civil union reforms. Hunter was the Chair of the Climate Change, Water and Environment Committee and was a member of the Justice and Community Safety Committee. At the 2012 ACT Elections, Hunter narrowly lost the 5th seat in Ginninnderra to Yvette Berry of the Labor Party, after suffering an ACT wide swing of more than 6% from the Greens. Her party could only return one MP, which was Shane Rattenbury, who thereby naturally became her successor as the Leader of the Greens.

== See also ==
- 2008 Australian Capital Territory election
- Members of the Australian Capital Territory Legislative Assembly, 2008–2012

Australian Capital Territory Legislative Assembly
| Preceded by Wayne Berry | Member for Ginninderra; 2008–2012; Served alongside: Stanhope, Dunne, Coe, Porter | Succeeded by Yvette Berry |
Party political offices
| Preceded by New office | Parliamentary Convener of the ACT Greens; 2008-2012 | Succeeded by Office Abolished |
