= ACT Greens =

- Leader: Jo Clay
- Deputy Leader: Andrew Braddock
- Convenor: Susan Helyar
- Founded: 1992
- Headquarters: 3/99 Northbourne Ave, Australian Capital Territory, Australia
- Youth wing: ACT Young Greens
- Ideology: Green politics Progressivism
- Political position: Left-wing
- National affiliation: Australian Greens
- Colours: Green
- Legislative Assembly: 4 / 25
- House of Representatives: 0 / 3 (ACT seats)
- Senate: 0 / 2 (ACT seats)

Website
- greens.org.au/act

The ACT Greens is a green political party located in the Australian Capital Territory (ACT), and a member of the federation of the Australian Greens. Both parties were formed in 1992, three years after the ACT achieved self-government in 1989.

Since its formation the ACT Greens has had a significant presence in the ACT Legislative Assembly, having formed minority or coalition governments with the Labor Party since 2008.

== History ==
1995–1998 Assembly

Two Greens candidates, Lucy Horodny and Kerrie Tucker, were successful at the 1995 election, the first to be run under the Hare-Clark system. The election resulted in a hung parliament, but the Liberal Party was able to form government with two independents.

1998–2001 Assembly

Kerrie Tucker was left as the only Greens member during this assembly, in which the Liberal Party again formed government with the help of independents.

2001–2004 Assembly

Kerrie Tucker was once again the only Greens member during this assembly, in which the Labor Party formed a minority government with her support and that of Australian Democrat Roslyn Dundas. There was no formal parliamentary agreement between the three governing parties for this assembly.

2004–2008 Assembly

This was the first ACT election since the enactment of a fixed four-year term. Deb Foskey was the sole Greens member of the assembly, in which the Labor Party held the majority.

2008–2012 Assembly

Following the 2008 election, the ACT Greens held the balance of power in the 17-member Legislative Assembly, with four members (Amanda Bresnan, Meredith Hunter, Shane Rattenbury and Caroline Le Couteur), to Labor's seven and the Liberals with six. After deliberations with both the Labor and Liberal parties, the Greens chose to support a Labor minority government.

2012–2016 Assembly

Following the 2012 ACT election, Shane Rattenbury was the only Greens MLA to retain his seat in the Legislative Assembly, and entered into a power sharing arrangement to allow the Labor Party to once again form minority government.

The agreement gave Shane Rattenbury the ministerial portfolios of Ageing; Housing; Corrections; and Aboriginal and Torres Strait Islander Affairs, as well as Territory and Municipal Services in the Second Gallagher Ministry and the First Barr Ministry.

2016–2020 Assembly

Shane Rattenbury retained a seat in the expanded Legislative Assembly at the 2016 ACT election, and held the ministerial portfolios of Climate Change and Sustainability; Corrections and Justice Health; Justice, Consumer Affairs and Road Safety; and Mental Health. Caroline Le Couteur was also reelected, after losing her seat in 2012. The Greens maintained their position in the balance of power for a third consecutive term, and the ACT Greens and ACT Labor parties signed another parliamentary agreement setting out the terms of their power-sharing arrangement in government.

2020–2024 Assembly

During the 2020 election, the Greens had an excellent result, winning an extra seat in each of the ACT's 5 electorates apart from Murumbidgee where they already had a seat. The party took 2 seats from the Labor party and 2 seats from the Liberal party. the 6 Greens MLAs formed government with the 10 Labor MLAs, negotiating a coalition agreement with 3 Greens members, Shane Rattenbury, Rebecca Vassarotti and Emma Davidson, being a part of the 9 person cabinet.

On 10 November 2023, member of the Greens Johnathan Davis was stood down from his duties as an MLA and referred to police by the ACT Greens after allegations he had sexual relationships with a boy under the legal age of consent (16-years old in the ACT) and a teenager who was a legally still a child, under 18 at the time. Davis resigned from parliament and as a member of the Greens on 12 November 2023.

2024–present

At the 2024 election the party lost two seats: Rebecca Vassarotti in their second Kurrajong seat to Thomas Emerson, then of Independents for Canberra; and Emma Davidson in Murrumbidgee to Fiona Carrick of Fiona Carrick Independent.

Following the election, the party moved to the crossbench and entered into a confidence and supply agreement with Labor who formed government alone for the first time in over a decade.

In December of 2025, the party moved out of their Braddon office at 2/18 Lonsdale Street.

In April 2026, Shane Rattenbury announced he would resign as an MLA "in the coming weeks". ACT Greens members will elect a new leader after his resignation becomes effective.

== Leader ==
=== Party leaders ===
| No. | Leader (birth–death) | Portrait | Electorate | Took office | Left office | Term | Chief Minister (term) |
|---|---|---|---|---|---|---|---|
| 1 | Kerrie Tucker (b. 1948) | | Molonglo | 21 February 1998 | 16 October 2004 | 6 years, 238 days | Carnell (1995–2000) |
| 1 | Kerrie Tucker (b. 1948) | | Molonglo | 21 February 1998 | 16 October 2004 | 6 years, 238 days | Humphries (2000–2001) |
| 1 | Kerrie Tucker (b. 1948) | | Molonglo | 21 February 1998 | 16 October 2004 | 6 years, 238 days | Stanhope (2001–2011) |
| 2 | Deb Foskey (1949–2020) | | Molonglo | 16 October 2004 | 18 October 2008 | 4 years, 2 days | Stanhope (2001–2011) |
| 3 | Meredith Hunter (b. 1962) | | Ginninderra | 18 October 2008 | 20 October 2012 | 4 years, 2 days | Stanhope (2001–2011) |
| 3 | Meredith Hunter (b. 1962) | | Ginninderra | 18 October 2008 | 20 October 2012 | 4 years, 2 days | Gallagher (2011–2014) |
| 4 | Shane Rattenbury (b. 1971) | | Molonglo (2008–2016) | 20 October 2012 | 15 May 2026 | 13 years, 207 days | Gallagher (2011–2014) |
| 4 | Shane Rattenbury (b. 1971) | | Molonglo (2008–2016) | 20 October 2012 | 15 May 2026 | 13 years, 207 days | Barr (2014–) |
| 4 | Shane Rattenbury (b. 1971) | | Kurrajong (2016–2026) | 20 October 2012 | 15 May 2026 | 13 years, 207 days | Barr (2014–) |
| 5 | Jo Clay (b. 1977) | | Ginninderra | 15 May 2026 | Incumbent | 187 days | Barr (2014–) |

=== Party deputy leaders ===
| No. | Leader (birth–death) | Portrait | Electorate | Took office | Left office | Term | Leader |
|---|---|---|---|---|---|---|---|
| 1 | Rebecca Vassarotti (b. 1972) | | Kurrajong | 13 March 2024 | 19 December 2024 | 281 days | Shane Rattenbury |
| 2 | Jo Clay (b. 1977) | | Ginninderra | 19 December 2024 | 15 May 2026 | 1 year, 147 days | Shane Rattenbury |
| - | Vacant | | | 15 May 2026 | 29 June 2026 | 45 days | Jo Clay |
| 3 | Andrew Braddock | | Yerrabi | 29 June 2026 | Incumbent | 142 days | Jo Clay |

== Electoral results ==
=== Territory ===
Legislative Assembly
| Election year | # of overall votes | % of overall vote | # of overall seats won | +/– | Position |
| 1995 | 14,967 | 9.1 (#3) | 2 / 17 | | Crossbench |
| 1998 | 16,417 | 9.1 (#4) | 1 / 17 | ▼1 | Crossbench |
| 2001 | 17,369 | 9.1 (#3) | 1 / 17 | Steady | Crossbench |
| 2004 | 18,997 | 9.3 (#3) | 1 / 17 | Steady | Crossbench |
| 2008 | 33,057 | 15.6 (#3) | 4 / 17 | ▲3 | Crossbench (supporting ACT Labor government) |
| 2012 | 23,773 | 10.7 (#3) | 1 / 17 | ▼3 | Coalition government |
| 2016 | 25,109 | 10.3 (#3) | 2 / 25 | ▲1 | Coalition government |
| 2020 | 36,307 | 13.5 (#3) | 6 / 25 | ▲4 | Coalition government |
| 2024 | 30,877 | 12.3 (#3) | 4 / 25 | ▼2 | Crossbench (supporting ACT Labor government) |

=== Federal ===
| Election | ACT House seats | | | | ACT Senate seats | | | |
| Election | Votes | % | Seats | +/– | Votes | % | Seats | +/– |
|---|---|---|---|---|---|---|---|---|
| 2001 | 14,335 | 7.1 | 0 / 2 | | 14,825 | 7.2 | 0 / 2 | |
| 2004 | 22,440 | 10.8 | 0 / 2 | 0 | 34,575 | 16.4 | 0 / 2 | 0 |
| 2007 | 29,424 | 13.2 | 0 / 2 | 0 | 48,384 | 21.5 | 0 / 2 | 0 |
| 2010 | 42,942 | 19.2 | 0 / 2 | 0 | 52,546 | 22.9 | 0 / 2 | 0 |
| 2013 | 32,356 | 13.4 | 0 / 2 | 0 | 47,553 | 19.3 | 0 / 2 | 0 |
| 2016 | 38,129 | 15.1 | 0 / 2 | 0 | 41,006 | 16.1 | 0 / 2 | 0 |
| 2019 | 44,804 | 16.9 | 0 / 3 | 0 | 47,855 | 17.7 | 0 / 2 | 0 |
| 2022 | 52,648 | 17.7 | 0 / 3 | 0 | 29,360 | 10.3 | 0 / 2 | 0 |
| 2025 | 43,753 | 15.1 | 0 / 3 | 0 | 22,838 | 7.8 | 0 / 2 | 0 |

== Members of Parliament ==
=== Legislative Assembly ===
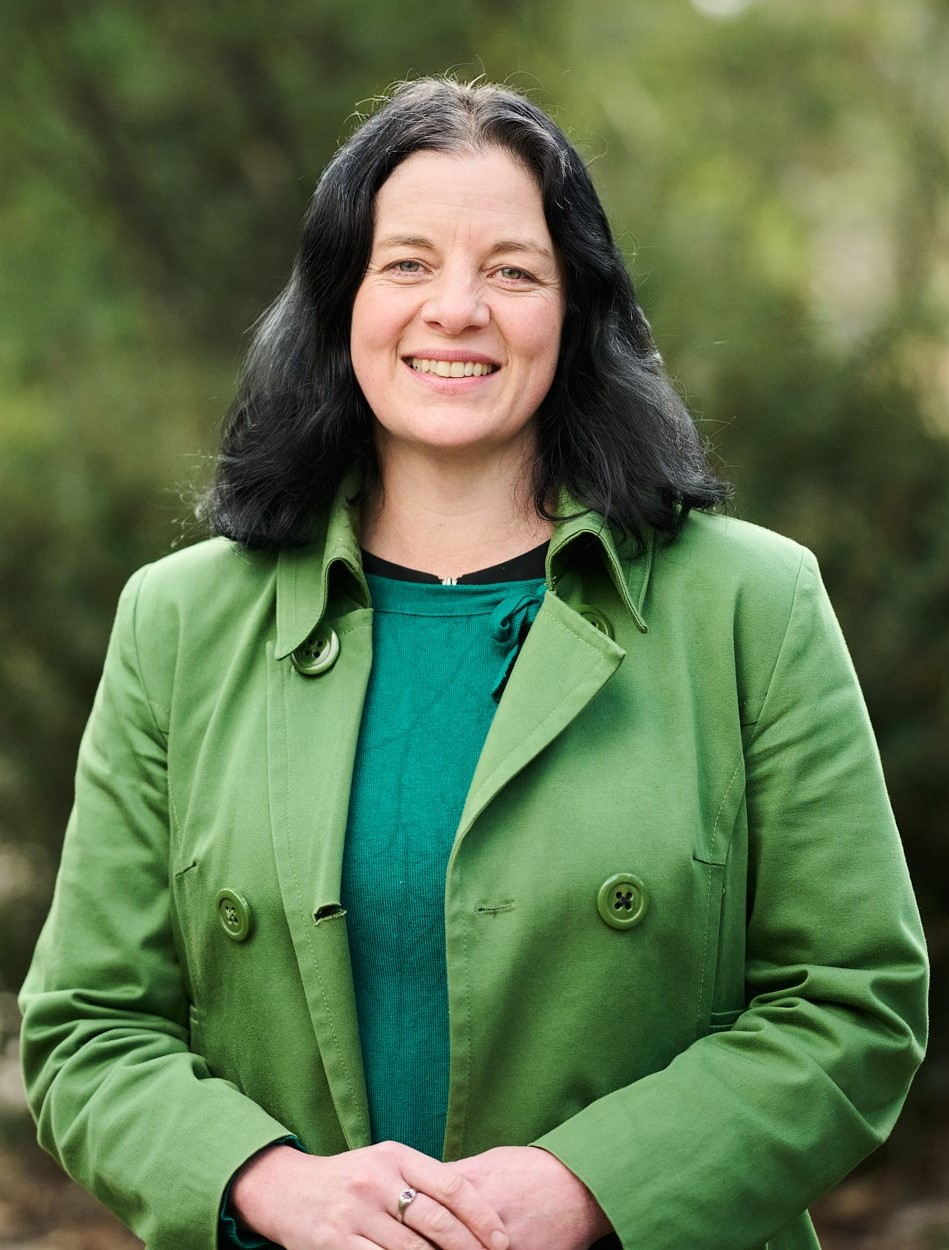
Jo Clay, MLA for Ginninderra (2020–present)

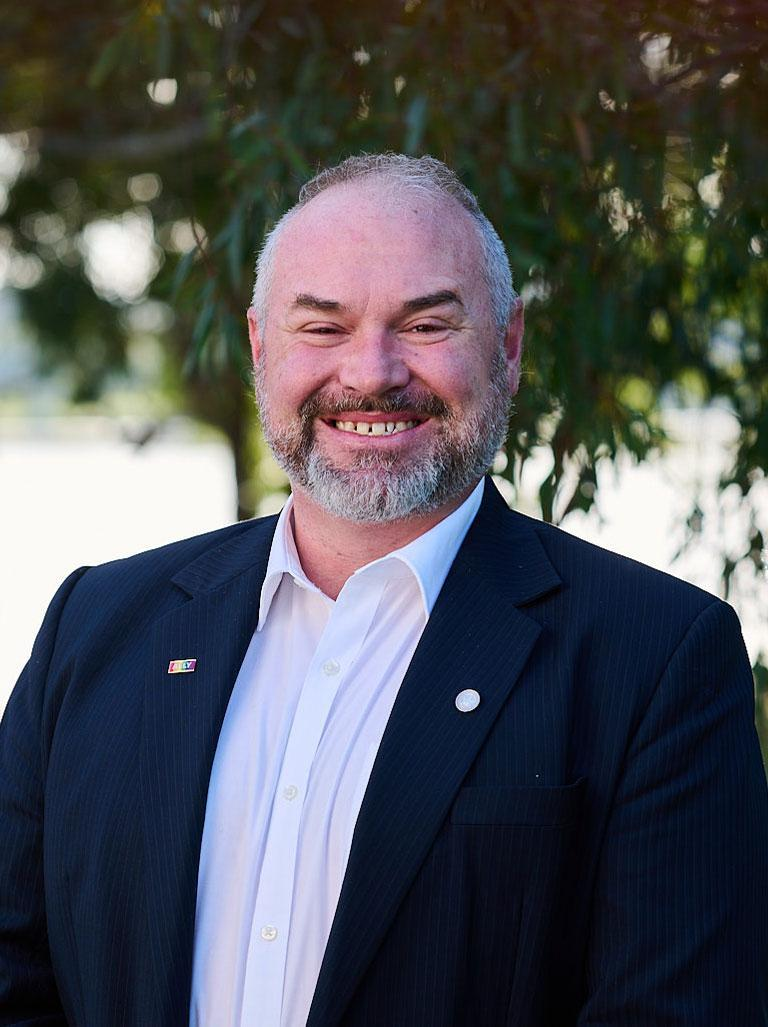
Andrew Braddock, MLA for Yerrabi (2020–present)

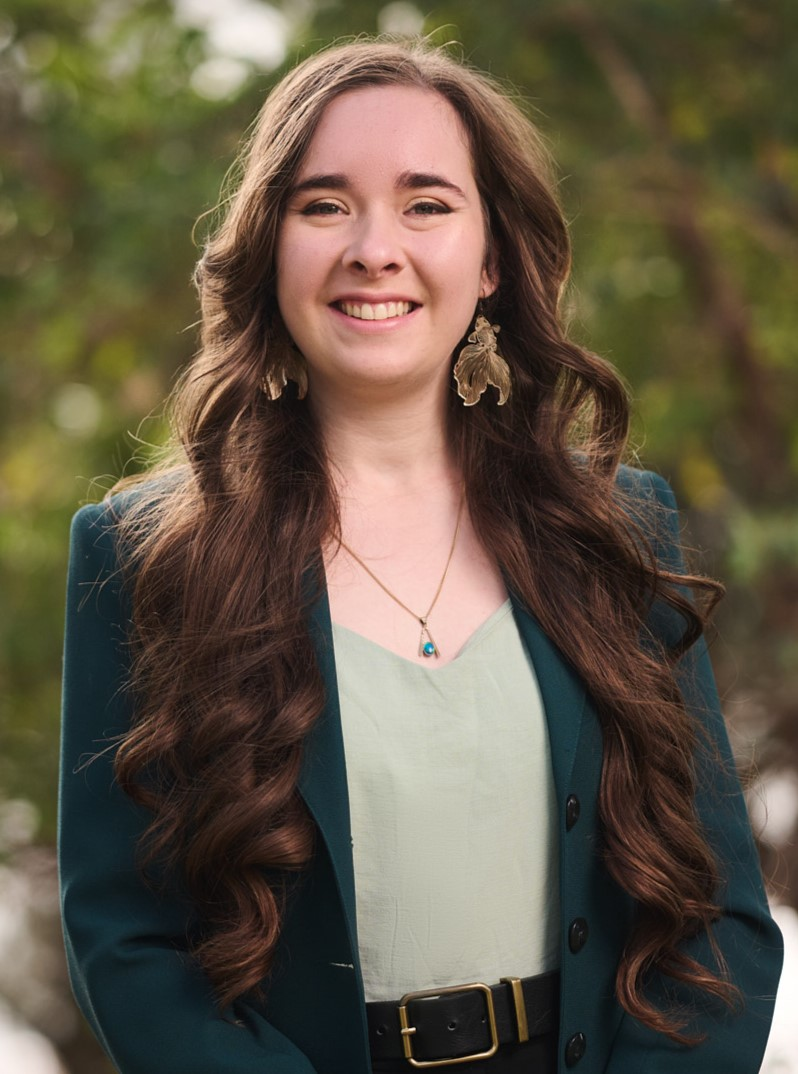
Laura Nuttall, MLA for Brindabella(2023–present)

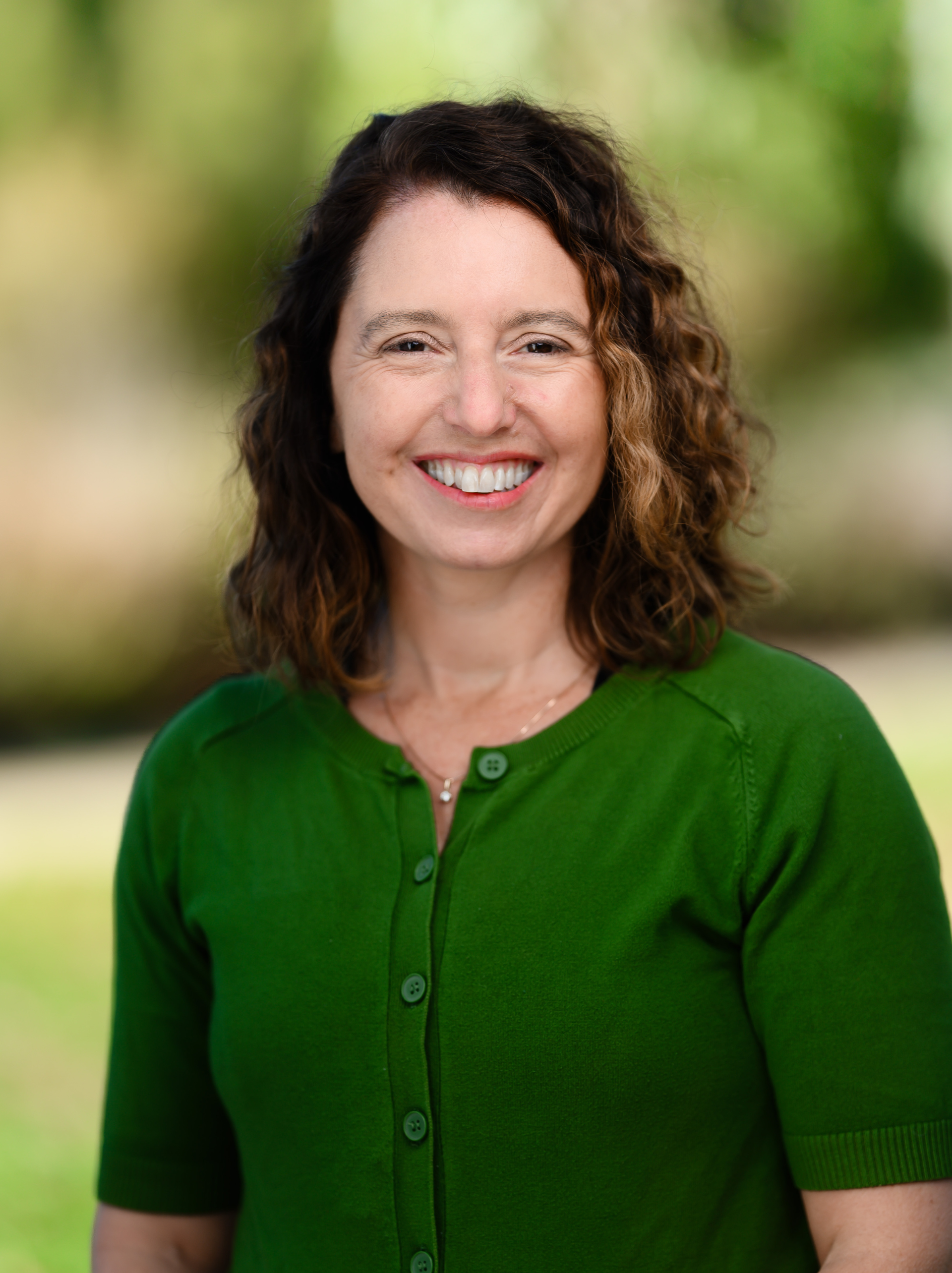
Rebecca Vassarotti, MLA for Kurrajong (2020–2024; 2026-present)

==== Former ====
- Lucy Horodny MLA (1995–1998)
- Kerrie Tucker MLA (1995–2004)
- Deb Foskey MLA (2004–2008)
- Amanda Bresnan MLA (2008–2012)
- Meredith Hunter MLA (2008–2012)
- Caroline Le Couteur MLA (2008–2012; 2016–2020)
- Johnathan Davis MLA (2020–2023)
- Emma Davidson MLA (2020–2024)
- Shane RattenburyMLA (2008–2026)
