= Deb Foskey =

Australian politician (1949–2020)

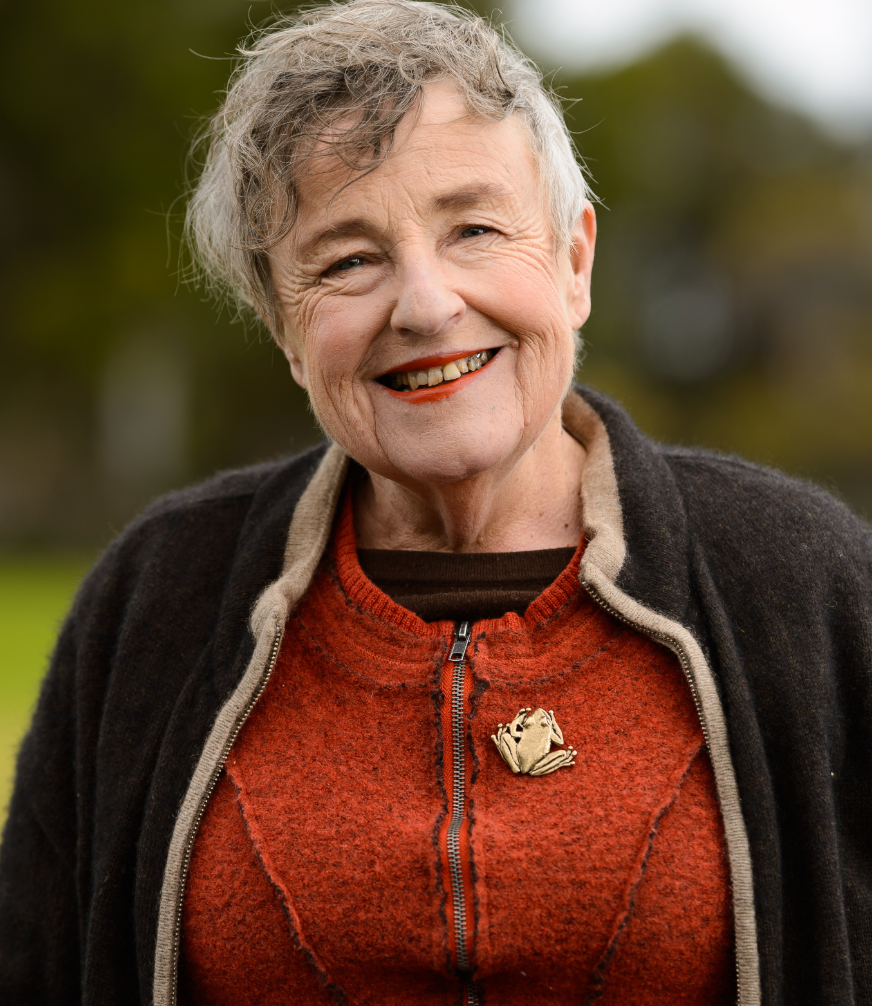
- Foskey circa 2019

Member of the Australian Capital Territory Legislative Assembly for Molonglo
- In office 16 October 2004 – 18 October 2008

Personal details
- Born: Deborah Jane Foskey; 12 November 1949 Terang, Victoria, Australia
- Died: 1 May 2020 (aged 70) Bairnsdale, Victoria, Australia
- Party: ACT Greens; Victorian Greens
- Children: 2 daughters
- Education: University of Melbourne; Australian National University
- Profession: Teacher, politician

Deborah Jane Foskey (12 November 1949 – 1 May 2020) was an Australian politician who served as a member of the Australian Capital Territory Legislative Assembly for Molonglo with the ACT Greens.

== Early life ==
Foskey was born at Terang in rural Western Victoria, the second of a family of four. Her father worked for the Victorian Department of Agriculture as a dairy supervisor and later moved to Bacchus Marsh. Deb was educated at Bacchus Marsh State School and Bacchus Marsh High School where she was dux in her final year. Foskey studied a Bachelor of Arts in English and philosophy and a Diploma in Education at the University of Melbourne where she boarded at Medley Hall, and worked as a primary and secondary school teacher.

She later lived in Cabanandra, East Gippsland and eventually moved with her children to the Australian Capital Territory in the 1980s. In 1986 her son Brandon died in the Murrumbidgee River at Casuarina Sands in the ACT.

In 1992, she undertook a Masters of Letters in human ecology at the Australian National University, looking at Canberra's development through a political and ecological lens, which she finished in 1994. In 1996, she undertook a Doctorate of Philosophy in political science and international relations at ANU, looking at the role of community movements in the framing of the Program of Action for the United Nations Conference on Population and Development, which she completed in 2003.

== Campaigns ==
In the 1970s and 1980s, she was instrumental in the formation of several national parks protecting old growth forests through her work in the Concerned Residents of East Gippsland.

In Canberra Foskey continued to campaign for protection of forests in SE NSW and East Gippsland, as well as working on forest policy. Foskey continued campaigning on forest protection, sustainability and climate change issues in her later years.

Foskey established WTOwatch in the ACT, as part of the anti-globalisation movement that grew around the Seattle WTO protests in 1999.

== Political career ==
Foskey was involved in the establishment phase of the ACT Greens in the early 1990s, and was an office bearer of the ACT Greens and the Australian Greens at various times during the 1990s. She ran for the Senate in the ACT for the Greens in 1998, and for the ACT Legislative Assembly seat of Molonglo in 2001. She was elected to the Australian Capital Territory Legislative Assembly in the 2004 election for the electorate of Molonglo as the only Green in a parliament of majority Labor Party governance, which she talks about in her inaugural speech. Foskey worked to raise issues of sustainability, democracy and compassion in her time in the Assembly, until her retirement in 2008.

In 2005, she courted controversy by refusing to leave her public subsidised house despite earning an MP's wage of over $100,000.

=== Further election campaigns ===
Foskey stood as a candidate in various elections to ensure that environmental issues were aired during the campaigns, including East Gippsland council elections in 2016. She ran as a Victorian Greens candidate at the 2018 Victorian state election for the seat of East Gippsland, but was unsuccessful. Climate change was a core issue for her in this campaign. She also unsuccessfully stood as the Greens candidate for Gippsland at the 2019 Australian federal election.

== After politics ==
After retiring from politics in the ACT, Foskey returned to Cabanandra in East Gippsland in late 2008. She worked as a consultant at the Centre for Rural Communities from 2009 and at Tubbut Neighbourhood House from 2011. She was Chair of the Orbost Exhibition Centre in late 2019.

== Personal life ==
Foskey had two daughters.

== Illness and death ==
In mid-2019, Foskey was diagnosed with lung cancer, and began chemotherapy in Bairnsdale. During her treatment, she was informed that her Cabanandra home had been destroyed in a fire. She died on 1 May 2020, aged 70.
