= Rebecca Vassarotti =

Australian politician (born 1972)

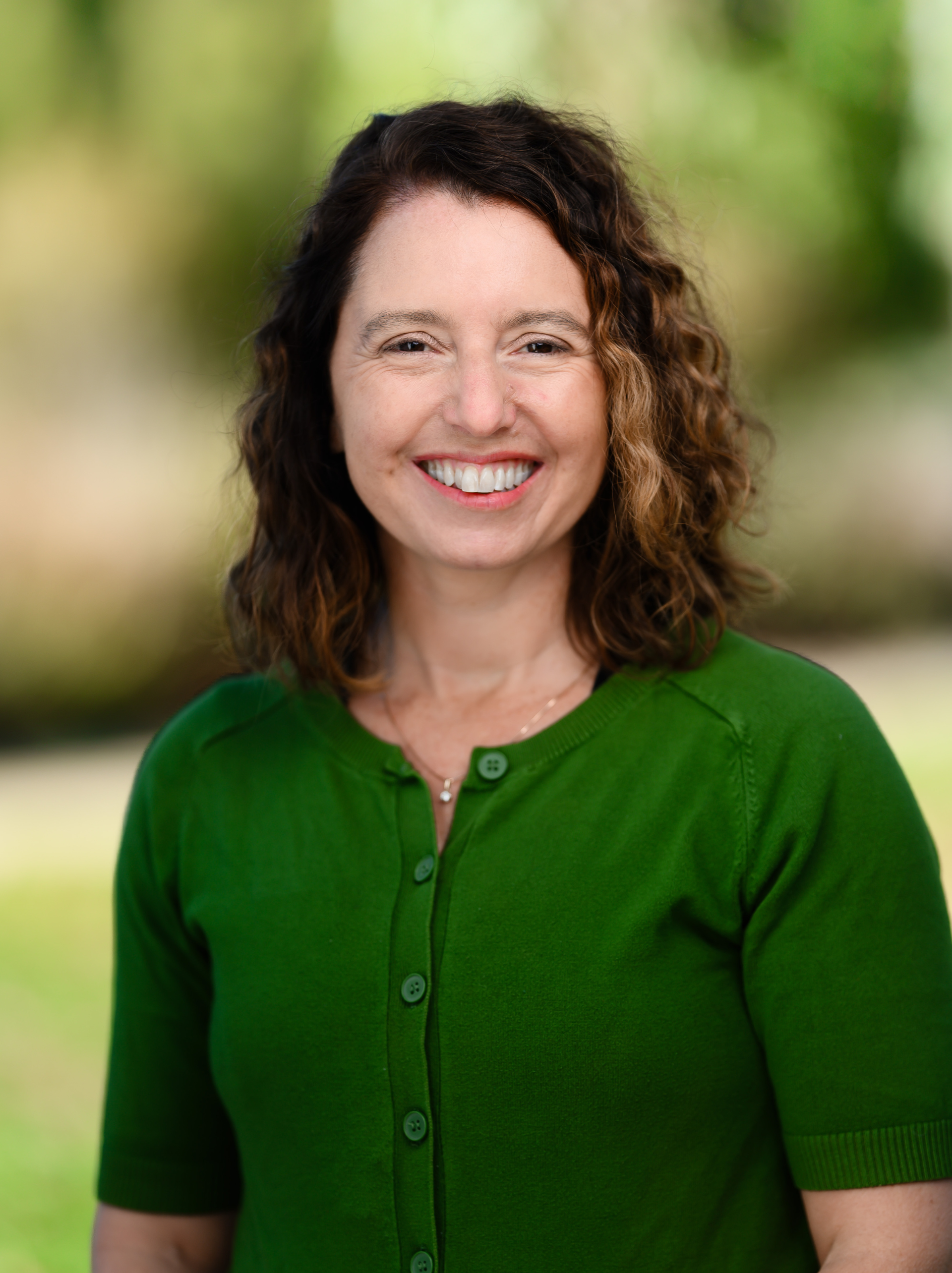

Member of the Australian Capital Territory Legislative Assembly for Kurrajong
- Incumbent
- Assumed office 5 June 2026
- Preceded by: Shane Rattenbury
- In office 17 October 2020 – 19 October 2024
- Preceded by: Candice Burch
- Succeeded by: Thomas Emerson

Deputy Leader of the ACT Greens
- In office 13 March 2024 – 19 December 2024
- Leader: Shane Rattenbury
- Preceded by: Position established
- Succeeded by: Jo Clay

Minister for Environment and Heritage
- In office 4 November 2020 – 19 October 2024
- Preceded by: Mick Gentleman
- Succeeded by: Suzanne Orr (Note: As Minister for Environment.); Chris Steel (Note: As Minister for Heritage.)

Minister for Homelessness and Housing Services
- In office 4 November 2020 – 19 October 2024
- Preceded by: Yvette Berry (Note: As Minister for Housing and Suburban Development.)
- Succeeded by: Yvette Berry (Note: As Minister for Housing and New Suburbs.)

Minister for Sustainable Building and Construction
- In office 4 November 2020 – 19 October 2024
- Preceded by: Position established
- Succeeded by: Chris Steel (Note: As Minister for Planning and Sustainable Development.)

Personal details
- Born: 1972 (age 53–54) Canberra, Australia
- Party: Greens
- Children: 3

Rebecca Vassarotti (born 1972) is an Australian politician serving who has served as a member for Kurrajong in the ACT Legislative Assembly from 2020 to 2024 and since June 2026. She previously held a number of ministerial portfolios as a member of the Third Barr ministry and deputy leader of the ACT Greens.

== Background ==
Vassarotti was born and raised in Canberra. Her mother was a teacher and is an advocate for public schooling.

Vassarotti spent ten years with the YWCA in Canberra, including as executive director. She worked as a consultant in the not-for-profit sector, and was director on the board of numerous companies. She was a finalist for the ACT Australian of the Year. She is also an advocate for a reduction in the access to poker machines and has been the Greens spokesperson on that issue.

At the 2020 ACT election, Vassarotti won one of the five seats in Kurrajong, taking the seat from the Liberals' Candice Burch. Following agreement between Labor and the Greens that the latter have three ministerial portfolios, Vassarotti was appointed Minister for Environment and Heritage, Minister for Homelessness and Housing Services, and Minister for Sustainable Building and Construction.

At the 2024 ACT election, Vassarotti lost her seat to Thomas Emerson, the leader of Independents for Canberra.

Following Shane Rattenbury's retirement, Vassarotti was elected via countback to fill the casual vacancy left in Kurrajong.
