= Results of the 2016 Australian Capital Territory election =

Results of 2016 Australian Capital territory general election

Australian Capital Territory election, 15 October 2016 Legislative Assembly << 2012–2020 >>
Enrolled voters	283,162				
Votes cast	250,460		Turnout	88.5%	−0.9
Informal votes	6,332		Informal	2.5%	−1.0
Summary of votes by party
Party	Primary votes	%	Swing	Seats	Change
Labor	93,811	38.4	−0.5	12	+4
Liberal	89,632	36.7	−2.2	11	+3
Greens	25,096	10.3	−0.5	2	+1
Independent	10,835	4.4	+2.6	0	0
Sex Party	7,474	3.1	+3.1	0	0
Liberal Democrats	5,028	2.1	+1.0	0	0
Sustainable Australia	3,831	1.6	+1.6	0	0
Animal Justice	3,681	1.5	+1.5	0	0
Like Canberra	2,624	1.1	+1.1	0	0
Canberra Community Voters	1,703	0.7	+0.7	0	0
Community Alliance	413	0.2	+0.2	0	0
Total	244,128			25	

This is a list of Legislative Assembly results for the 2016 Australian Capital Territory election.

== Results by electorate ==
=== Brindabella ===
2016 Australian Capital Territory election: Brindabella
Party	Candidate	Votes	%	±%
Quota		7,806		
Liberal	Andrew Wall (elected 1)	5,614	12.0	+7.5
Liberal	Mark Parton (elected 4)	4,962	10.6	+10.6
Liberal	Nicole Lawder (elected 5)	4,166	8.9	+5.4
Liberal	Ed Cocks	3,195	6.8	+6.8
Liberal	Annette Fazey-Southwell	1,669	3.6	+3.6
Labor	Mick Gentleman (elected 2)	3,964	8.5	+0.2
Labor	Joy Burch (elected 3)	3,838	8.2	−5.3
Labor	Taimus Werner-Gibbings	3,131	6.7	+6.7
Labor	Angie Drake	2,940	6.3	+6.3
Labor	Karl Maftoum	1,871	4.0	−1.2
Sex Party	Steven Bailey	2,071	4.4	+4.4
Sex Party	Monique Shepherd	1,623	3.5	+3.5
Greens	Michael Mazengarb	1,125	2.4	+2.4
Greens	Johnathan Davis	684	1.5	+0.3
Greens	Ben Murphy	590	1.3	+0.4
Independent	Joel McKay	1,200	2.6	+2.6
Liberal Democrats	Matt Donnelly	284	0.6	+0.6
Liberal Democrats	Greg Renet	261	0.6	+0.6
Liberal Democrats	Jacob Gowor	256	0.5	+0.5
Liberal Democrats	Vera Saragih	205	0.4	+0.4
Liberal Democrats	Matt Straschko	169	0.4	+0.4
Animal Justice	Sarah O'Brien	632	1.3	+1.3
Animal Justice	Robyn Soxsmith	474	1.0	+1.0
Independent	Andrew Holt	767	1.6	+1.6
Sustainable Australia	Melissa Kemp	446	1.0	+1.0
Sustainable Australia	Claude Hastir	251	0.5	+0.5
Like Canberra	Richard Tuffin	231	0.5	+0.5
Like Canberra	Timothy Friel	211	0.5	+0.5
Total formal votes		46,830	97.1	
Informal votes		1,405	2.9	
Turnout		48,235	90.0	
Party total votes
Liberal		19,606	41.9	−4.5
Labor		15,744	33.6	−1.8
Sex Party		3,694	7.9	+7.9
Greens		2,399	5.1	−2.2
Independent	Joel McKay	1,200	2.6	+2.6
Liberal Democrats		1,175	2.5	+2.5
Animal Justice		1,106	2.4	+2.4
Independent	Andrew Holt	767	1.6	+1.6
Sustainable Australia		697	1.5	+1.5
Like Canberra		442	0.9	+0.9
Liberal hold		Swing	+7.5	
Liberal hold		Swing	+10.6	
Liberal hold		Swing	+5.4	
Labor hold		Swing	+0.2	
Labor hold		Swing	–5.3	

=== Ginninderra ===
2016 Australian Capital Territory election: Ginninderra
Party	Candidate	Votes	%	±%
Quota		7,858		
Labor	Yvette Berry (elected 1)	4,770	10.1	+1.5
Labor	Gordon Ramsay (elected 5)	3,934	8.3	+8.3
Labor	Tara Cheyne (elected 4)	3,875	8.2	+8.2
Labor	Chris Bourke	3,551	7.5	+0.1
Labor	Kim Fischer	3,364	7.1	+7.1
Liberal	Vicki Dunne (elected 2)	4,251	9.0	+1.4
Liberal	Paul Sweeney	3,202	6.8	+6.8
Liberal	Elizabeth Kikkert (elected 3)	3,158	6.7	+6.7
Liberal	Denise Fisher	2,802	5.9	+5.9
Liberal	Ignatius Rozario	1,682	3.6	+3.6
Greens	Indra Esguerra	3,036	6.4	+6.4
Greens	Jason Chappel	818	1.7	+1.7
Greens	Richard Merzian	719	1.5	+1.5
Independent	Kim Huynh	2,365	5.0	+5.0
Sustainable Australia	Martin Tye	637	1.4	+1.4
Sustainable Australia	Geoff Buckmaster	468	1.0	+1.0
Community Voters	Geoff Kettle	274	0.6	+0.6
Community Voters	Alan Tutt	262	0.6	+0.6
Community Voters	Beth Gooch	122	0.3	+0.3
Community Voters	Mick Kaye	88	0.2	+0.2
Community Voters	Gilbert Reilly	68	0.1	+0.1
Independent	Leigh Watson	770	1.6	+1.6
Liberal Democrats	Naomi Gowor	309	0.7	+0.7
Liberal Democrats	Guy Jakeman	278	0.6	+0.6
Like Canberra	Sam Huggins	228	0.5	+0.5
Like Canberra	Richard Harriss	222	0.5	+0.5
Animal Justice	Bernie Brennan	444	0.9	+0.9
Independent	Vijay Dubey	386	0.8	+0.8
Independent	Emmanuel Ezekiel-Hart	342	0.7	−0.3
Independent	Vanessa Jones	242	0.5	+0.5
Independent	David Edwards	217	0.5	+0.5
Independent	Lea Zangl	136	0.3	+0.3
Independent	Ian Coombes	122	0.3	+0.3
Total formal votes		47,142	97.2	
Informal votes		1,373	2.8	
Turnout		48,515	88.9	
Party total votes
Labor		19,494	41.4	+0.8
Liberal		15,095	32.0	−0.5
Greens		4,573	9.7	−0.8
Independent	Kim Huynh	2,365	5.0	+5.0
Sustainable Australia		1,105	2.3	+2.3
Community Voters		814	1.7	+1.7
Independent	Leigh Watson	770	1.6	+1.6
Liberal Democrats		587	1.2	−0.6
Like Canberra		450	1.0	+1.0
Animal Justice	Bernie Brennan	444	0.9	+0.9
Independent	Vijay Dubey	386	0.8	+0.8
Independent	Emmanuel Ezekiel-Hart	342	0.7	−0.3
Independent	Vanessa Jones	242	0.5	+0.5
Independent	David Edwards	217	0.5	+0.5
Independent	Lea Zangl	136	0.3	+0.3
Independent	Ian Coombes	122	0.3	+0.3
Labor hold		Swing	+1.5	
Labor hold		Swing	+8.3	
Labor hold		Swing	+8.2	
Liberal hold		Swing	+1.4	
Liberal hold		Swing	+6.7	

=== Kurrajong ===
2016 Australian Capital Territory election: Kurrajong
Party	Candidate	Votes	%	±%
Quota		8,142		
Labor	Andrew Barr (elected 1)	10,398	21.3	+16.2
Labor	Rachel Stephen-Smith (elected 5)	2,782	5.7	+5.7
Labor	Josh Ceramidas	2,249	4.6	+4.6
Labor	Leah Dwyer	1,472	3.0	+3.0
Labor	Richard Niven	1,472	3.0	+3.0
Liberal	Elizabeth Lee (elected 3)	4,429	9.1	+3.2
Liberal	Steve Doszpot (elected 4)	3,834	7.8	+2.3
Liberal	Candice Burch	2,859	5.9	+5.9
Liberal	Brooke Curtin	2,739	5.6	+5.6
Liberal	Peter McKay	1,279	2.6	+2.6
Greens	Shane Rattenbury (elected 2)	6,307	12.9	+6.1
Greens	Rebecca Vassarotti	1,685	3.4	+3.4
Greens	Jill Thomsen	1,173	2.4	+2.4
Independent	Marea Fatseas	1,597	3.3	+3.3
Liberal Democrats	Michael O'Rourke	395	0.8	+0.8
Liberal Democrats	Mark Ellis	394	0.8	+0.8
Liberal Democrats	Hugh Upton	268	0.5	+0.5
Community Voters	Richard Farmer	373	0.8	+0.8
Community Voters	Mike Hettinger	299	0.6	+0.6
Community Voters	Lucinda Spier	217	0.4	+0.4
Sustainable Australia	John Haydon	356	0.7	+0.7
Sustainable Australia	Oliver Tye	289	0.6	+0.6
Animal Justice	Jeff Isaacs	602	1.2	+1.2
Like Canberra	Chris Bucknell	210	0.4	+0.4
Like Canberra	Maryann Mussared	209	0.4	+0.4
Independent	Peter Robinson	388	0.8	+0.8
Independent	Graeme Strachan	150	0.3	+0.3
Total formal votes		48,848	97.9	
Informal votes		1,051	2.1	
Turnout		49,899	84.6	
Party total votes
Labor		18,796	38.5	−1.8
Liberal		15,140	31.0	−3.6
Greens		9,165	18.8	+3.0
Independent	Marea Fatseas	1,597	3.3	+3.3
Liberal Democrats		1,057	2.2	+0.9
Community Voters		889	1.8	+1.8
Sustainable Australia		645	1.3	+1.3
Animal Justice	Jeff Isaacs	602	1.2	+1.2
Like Canberra		419	0.9	+0.9
Independent	Peter Robinson	388	0.8	+0.8
Independent	Graeme Strachan	150	0.3	+0.3

=== Murrumbidgee ===
2016 Australian Capital Territory election: Murrumbidgee
Party	Candidate	Votes	%	±%
Quota		8,343		
Liberal	Jeremy Hanson (elected 1)	11,224	22.4	+13.4
Liberal	Giulia Jones (elected 4)	3,594	7.2	+2.0
Liberal	Peter Hosking	3,530	7.1	+7.1
Liberal	Paul House	1,737	3.5	+3.5
Liberal	Jessica Adelan-Langford	1,340	2.7	+2.7
Labor	Chris Steel (elected 3)	4,574	9.1	+9.1
Labor	Bec Cody (elected 2)	4,373	8.7	+6.5
Labor	Jennifer Newman	3,260	6.5	+6.5
Labor	Brendan Long	2,680	5.4	+5.4
Labor	Mark Kulasingham	2,378	4.8	+2.9
Greens	Caroline Le Couteur (elected 5)	3,248	6.5	+4.0
Greens	Emma Davidson	1,171	2.3	+2.3
Greens	Jennifer Faerber	906	1.8	+1.8
Sex Party	Robbie Swan	1,746	3.5	+3.5
Animal Justice	Deborah Field	567	1.1	+1.1
Animal Justice	Jessica Montagne	504	1.0	+1.0
Liberal Democrats	Roman Gowor	215	0.4	+0.4
Liberal Democrats	Tom Hamer	166	0.3	+0.3
Liberal Democrats	Brendan Cumpston	153	0.3	+0.3
Liberal Democrats	Fergus Brown	141	0.3	+0.3
Liberal Democrats	Alexander Klinkon	138	0.3	+0.3
Like Canberra	Rod Vickers	338	0.7	+0.7
Like Canberra	Shelley Dickerson	320	0.6	+0.6
Sustainable Australia	Mark O'Connor	368	0.7	+0.7
Sustainable Australia	Jill Mail	284	0.6	+0.6
Community Alliance	Michael Lindfield	235	0.5	+0.5
Community Alliance	Nancy-Louise Scherger	178	0.4	+0.4
Independent	Margaret Webber	372	0.7	+0.7
Independent	Brendan Whyte	315	0.6	+0.6
Total formal votes		50,055	97.6	
Informal votes		1,235	2.4	
Turnout		51,290	89.9	
Party total votes
Liberal		21,425	42.8	+1.2
Labor		17,265	34.5	−5.2
Greens		5,325	10.6	−0.2
Sex Party	Robbie Swan	1,746	3.5	+3.5
Animal Justice		1,071	2.1	+2.1
Liberal Democrats		813	1.6	+1.6
Like Canberra		658	1.3	+1.3
Sustainable Australia		652	1.3	+1.3
Community Alliance		413	0.8	+0.8
Independent	Margaret Webber	372	0.7	+0.7
Independent	Brendan Whyte	315	0.6	+0.6

=== Yerrabi ===
2016 Australian Capital Territory election: Yerrabi
Party	Candidate	Votes	%	±%
Quota		8,543		
Labor	Meegan Fitzharris (elected 1)	7,790	15.2	+11.4
Labor	Michael Pettersson (elected 3)	4,817	9.4	+9.4
Labor	Suzanne Orr (elected 4)	3,726	7.3	+7.3
Labor	Jayson Hinder	3,206	6.3	+3.8
Labor	Deepak-Raj Gupta	2,973	5.8	+5.8
Liberal	Alistair Coe (elected 2)	7,259	14.2	+4.5
Liberal	James Milligan (elected 5)	3,872	7.6	+3.8
Liberal	Jacob Vadakkedathu	3,146	6.1	+3.7
Liberal	Amanda Lynch	2,658	5.2	+5.2
Liberal	Justin States	1,431	2.8	+2.8
Greens	Veronica Wensing	2,332	4.5	+4.5
Greens	Andrew Braddock	747	1.5	+1.5
Greens	Tobias Holm	555	1.1	+1.1
Sex Party	Andrew Dewson	1,055	2.1	+2.1
Sex Party	Susie Kennett	979	1.9	+1.9
Liberal Democrats	Dave Green	766	1.5	+1.5
Liberal Democrats	Declan Keating	630	1.2	+1.2
Independent	David Pollard	1,211	2.4	+2.4
Sustainable Australia	Violet Sheridan	470	0.9	+0.9
Sustainable Australia	Paul Gabriel	262	0.5	+0.5
Like Canberra	Tim Bohm	409	0.8	+0.8
Like Canberra	Casey Heffernan	246	0.5	+0.5
Animal Justice	Mandy Cottingham	458	0.9	+0.9
	Daniel Evans	255	0.5	+0.5
Total formal votes		51,253	97.6	
Informal votes		1,244	2.4	
Turnout		52,497	89.1	
Party total votes
Labor		22,512	43.9	+5.2
Liberal		18,366	35.8	−3.1
Greens		3,634	7.1	−2.3
Sex Party		2,034	4.0	+4.0
Liberal Democrats		1,396	2.7	+1.0
Independent	David Pollard	1,211	2.4	+2.4
Sustainable Australia		732	1.4	+1.4
Like Canberra		655	1.3	+1.3
Animal Justice	Mandy Cottingham	458	0.9	+0.9
	Daniel Evans	255	0.5	+0.5

== See also ==
- Members of the Australian Capital Territory Legislative Assembly, 2016–2020
- List of Australian Capital Territory elections
