= Electoral results for Ginninderra electorate =

This is a list of electoral results for Ginninderra electorate in ACT Legislative Assembly elections since 2008.

== Election results ==
=== Elections in the 2020s ===
==== 2024 ====
2024 Australian Capital Territory election: Ginninderra
Party	Candidate	Votes	%	±%
Quota		9,343		
Labor	Tara Cheyne (elected 1)	7,813	13.9	+2.6
Labor	Yvette Berry (elected 2)	7,727	13.8	−1.8
Labor	Heidi Prowse	2,190	3.9	+3.9
Labor	Tim Bavinton	2,095	3.7	+3.7
Labor	Sean Sadimoen	1,001	1.8	+1.8
Liberal	Peter Cain (elected 3)	5,782	10.3	+4.8
Liberal	Chiaka Barry (elected 5)	3,601	6.4	+6.4
Liberal	Joe Prevedello	2,894	5.2	+5.2
Liberal	Darren Roberts	2,494	4.4	+4.4
Greens	Jo Clay (elected 4)	3,426	6.1	−0.1
Greens	Adele Sinclair	2,090	3.7	+3.7
Greens	Dani Hunter	1,238	2.2	+2.2
Greens	Tim Liersch	1,126	2.0	−0.3
Independents for Canberra	Mark Richardson	2,116	3.8	+3.8
Independents for Canberra	Leanne Foresti	1,443	2.6	+2.6
Independents for Canberra	Suzanne Nucifora	670	1.2	+1.2
Belco	Bill Stefaniak	1,527	2.7	−1.3
Belco	Alan Tutt	696	1.2	+0.1
Belco	Angela Lount	397	0.7	−0.2
Family First	Elizabeth Kikkert	1,926	3.4	−5.9
Family First	Andrew Wallace	445	0.8	+0.8
Family First	Sunil Baby	223	0.4	+0.4
Animal Justice	Lara Drew	514	0.9	−0.1
Animal Justice	Carolyne Drew	443	0.8	+0.1
Democratic Labour	Helen Crowe	223	0.4	+0.4
Democratic Labour	Maxwell Spencer	152	0.3	+0.3
Democratic Labour	John Vandenburgh	149	0.3	+0.3
Democratic Labour	Douglas Cooper	146	0.3	+0.3
Democratic Labour	Rick Howard	129	0.2	+0.2
Independent	Janine Haskins	643	1.1	+1.1
Libertarian	Guy Jakeman	221	0.4	−0.1
Libertarian	Arved von Brasch	178	0.3	+0.3
Independent	Mignonne Cullen	324	0.6	−0.7
Total formal votes		56,052	98.0	−0.5
Informal votes		1,156	2.0	+0.5
Turnout		57,208	86.9	−2.2
Party total votes
Labor		20,826	37.2	−2.8
Liberal		14,771	26.4	−0.4
Greens		7,880	14.1	+1.6
Independents for Canberra		4,229	7.5	+7.5
Belco		2,620	4.7	−4.7
Family First		2,594	4.6	+4.6
Animal Justice		957	1.7	−0.0
Democratic Labour		809	1.4	−1.0
Independent	Janine Haskins	643	1.1	+1.1
Libertarian		399	0.7	−0.1
Independent	Mignonne Cullen	324	0.6	−0.7
Labor hold		Swing	+2.6	
Labor hold		Swing	−1.8	
Liberal hold		Swing	+4.8	
Liberal hold		Swing	+6.4	
Greens hold		Swing	−0.1	

==== 2020 ====
2020 Australian Capital Territory election: Ginninderra
Party	Candidate	Votes	%	±%
Quota		9,338		
Labor	Yvette Berry (elected 1)	8,756	15.6	+5.5
Labor	Tara Cheyne (elected 3)	6,306	11.3	+3.0
Labor	Gordon Ramsay	4,783	8.5	+0.2
Labor	Sue Ducker	1,288	2.3	+2.3
Labor	Greg Lloyd	1,276	2.3	+2.3
Liberal	Elizabeth Kikkert (elected 2)	5,222	9.3	+2.6
Liberal	Peter Cain (elected 5)	3,069	5.5	+5.5
Liberal	Robert Gunning	2,822	5.0	+5.0
Liberal	Kacey Lam	2,256	4.0	+4.0
Liberal	Ignatius Rozario	1,608	2.9	−0.7
Greens	Jo Clay (elected 4)	3,495	6.2	+6.2
Greens	Katt Millner	2,242	4.0	+4.0
Greens	Tim Liersch	1,269	2.3	+2.3
Belco	Bill Stefaniak	2,214	4.0	+4.0
Belco	Chic Henry	1,517	2.7	+2.7
Belco	Alan Tutt	626	1.1	+1.1
Belco	Angela Lount	493	0.9	+0.9
Belco	Vijay Dubey	414	0.7	+0.7
Democratic Labour	Helen McClure	724	1.3	+1.3
Democratic Labour	Ian McClure	623	1.1	+1.1
Shooters, Fishers, Farmers	Matthew Ogilvie	676	1.2	+1.2
Shooters, Fishers, Farmers	Oliver Smith	614	1.1	+1.1
Sustainable Australia	Mark O'Connor	579	1.0	+1.0
Sustainable Australia	Paul Gabriel	408	0.7	+0.7
Animal Justice	Lara Drew	541	1.0	+1.0
Animal Justice	Carolyne Drew	418	0.7	+0.7
Independent	Mignonne Cullen	704	1.3	+1.3
Climate Change Justice	Jonathan Stavridis	215	0.4	+0.4
Climate Change Justice	Sok Kheng Ngep	203	0.4	+0.4
Climate Change Justice	Oksana Demetrios	200	0.4	+0.4
Liberal Democrats	Guy Jakeman	258	0.5	−0.1
Liberal Democrats	Dominic De Luca	206	0.4	+0.4
Total formal votes		56,025	98.5	+1.3
Informal votes		865	1.5	−1.3
Turnout		56,890	89.1	+0.2
Party total votes
Labor		22,409	40.0	−1.4
Liberal		14,977	26.7	−5.3
Greens		7,006	12.5	+0.8
Belco		5,264	9.4	+9.4
Democratic Labour		1,347	2.4	+2.4
Shooters, Fishers, Farmers		1,290	2.3	+2.3
Sustainable Australia		987	2.3	+2.3
Animal Justice		959	1.7	+0.8
Independent	Mignonne Cullen	704	1.3	+1.3
Climate Change Justice		618	1.1	+1.1
Liberal Democrats		464	0.8	−0.4
Labor hold		Swing	+5.5	
Labor hold		Swing	+3.0	
Liberal hold		Swing	+2.6	
Liberal hold		Swing	+5.5	
Greens gain from Labor		Swing	+6.2	

=== Elections in the 2010s ===
==== 2016 ====
2016 Australian Capital Territory election: Ginninderra
Party	Candidate	Votes	%	±%
Quota		7,858		
Labor	Yvette Berry (elected 1)	4,770	10.1	+1.5
Labor	Gordon Ramsay (elected 5)	3,934	8.3	+8.3
Labor	Tara Cheyne (elected 4)	3,875	8.2	+8.2
Labor	Chris Bourke	3,551	7.5	+0.1
Labor	Kim Fischer	3,364	7.1	+7.1
Liberal	Vicki Dunne (elected 2)	4,251	9.0	+1.4
Liberal	Paul Sweeney	3,202	6.8	+6.8
Liberal	Elizabeth Kikkert (elected 3)	3,158	6.7	+6.7
Liberal	Denise Fisher	2,802	5.9	+5.9
Liberal	Ignatius Rozario	1,682	3.6	+3.6
Greens	Indra Esguerra	3,036	6.4	+6.4
Greens	Jason Chappel	818	1.7	+1.7
Greens	Richard Merzian	719	1.5	+1.5
Independent	Kim Huynh	2,365	5.0	+5.0
Sustainable Australia	Martin Tye	637	1.4	+1.4
Sustainable Australia	Geoff Buckmaster	468	1.0	+1.0
Community Voters	Geoff Kettle	274	0.6	+0.6
Community Voters	Alan Tutt	262	0.6	+0.6
Community Voters	Beth Gooch	122	0.3	+0.3
Community Voters	Mick Kaye	88	0.2	+0.2
Community Voters	Gilbert Reilly	68	0.1	+0.1
Independent	Leigh Watson	770	1.6	+1.6
Liberal Democrats	Naomi Gowor	309	0.7	+0.7
Liberal Democrats	Guy Jakeman	278	0.6	+0.6
Like Canberra	Sam Huggins	228	0.5	+0.5
Like Canberra	Richard Harriss	222	0.5	+0.5
Animal Justice	Bernie Brennan	444	0.9	+0.9
Independent	Vijay Dubey	386	0.8	+0.8
Independent	Emmanuel Ezekiel-Hart	342	0.7	−0.3
Independent	Vanessa Jones	242	0.5	+0.5
Independent	David Edwards	217	0.5	+0.5
Independent	Lea Zangl	136	0.3	+0.3
Independent	Ian Coombes	122	0.3	+0.3
Total formal votes		47,142	97.2	
Informal votes		1,373	2.8	
Turnout		48,515	88.9	
Party total votes
Labor		19,494	41.4	+0.8
Liberal		15,095	32.0	−0.5
Greens		4,573	9.7	−0.8
Independent	Kim Huynh	2,365	5.0	+5.0
Sustainable Australia		1,105	2.3	+2.3
Community Voters		814	1.7	+1.7
Independent	Leigh Watson	770	1.6	+1.6
Liberal Democrats		587	1.2	−0.6
Like Canberra		450	1.0	+1.0
Animal Justice	Bernie Brennan	444	0.9	+0.9
Independent	Vijay Dubey	386	0.8	+0.8
Independent	Emmanuel Ezekiel-Hart	342	0.7	−0.3
Independent	Vanessa Jones	242	0.5	+0.5
Independent	David Edwards	217	0.5	+0.5
Independent	Lea Zangl	136	0.3	+0.3
Independent	Ian Coombes	122	0.3	+0.3
Labor hold		Swing	+1.5	
Labor hold		Swing	+8.3	
Labor hold		Swing	+8.2	
Liberal hold		Swing	+1.4	
Liberal hold		Swing	+6.7	

==== 2012 ====
2012 Australian Capital Territory election: Ginninderra
Party	Candidate	Votes	%	±%
Quota		11,013		
Labor	Mary Porter (elected 3)	9,423	14.3	+8.1
Labor	Chris Bourke (elected 4)	5,048	7.6	+5.2
Labor	Yvette Berry (elected 5)	4,917	7.4	+7.4
Labor	Glen McCrea	4,153	6.3	+6.3
Labor	Jayson Hinder	2,813	4.3	+4.3
Liberal	Alistair Coe (elected 1)	10,017	15.2	+5.4
Liberal	Vicki Dunne (elected 2)	5,167	7.8	+0.7
Liberal	Jacob Vadakkedathu	2,820	4.3	+4.3
Liberal	Matt Watts	2,750	4.2	+1.6
Liberal	Merinda Nash	1,521	2.3	+2.3
Greens	Meredith Hunter	4,462	6.8	−3.4
Greens	Hannah Parris	1,137	1.7	+1.7
Greens	James Higgins	1,077	1.6	−2.1
Motorist	Chic Henry	4,360	6.6	+6.6
Motorist	Darryl Walford	434	0.7	−1.0
Bullet Train	Chris Bucknell	1,262	1.9	+1.9
Bullet Train	Tony Halton	1,096	1.7	+1.7
Liberal Democrats	Matt Thompson	819	1.2	+1.2
Liberal Democrats	Mustafa Jawadi	394	0.6	+0.6
Lê Social Justice	Marion Lê	532	0.8	+0.8
Lê Social Justice	Nehmat Nana Jbeili	162	0.2	+0.2
Lê Social Justice	Kate Reynolds	105	0.2	+0.2
Lê Social Justice	Karamia Lê	80	0.1	+0.1
Lê Social Justice	Majlinda Bitani	61	0.1	+0.1
Independent	Emmanuel Ezekiel-Hart	589	0.9	+0.9
Independent	Norm Gingell	454	0.7	+0.7
	Glen Takkenberg	279	0.4	+0.4
	Darren Churchill	144	0.2	−0.1
Total formal votes		66,076	96.3	+0.3
Informal votes		2,569	3.7	−0.3
Turnout		68,645	90.2	−1.3
Party total votes
Labor		26,354	39.9	−0.3
Liberal		22,275	33.7	+5.9
Greens		6,676	10.1	−3.8
Motorist		4,794	7.3	+1.2
Bullet Train		2,358	3.6	+3.6
Liberal Democrats		1,213	1.8	+1.8
Lê Social Justice		940	1.4	+1.4
Independent	Emmanuel Ezekiel-Hart	589	0.9	+0.9
Independent	Norm Gingell	454	0.7	+0.7
	Glen Takkenberg	279	0.4	+0.4
	Darren Churchill	144	0.2	−0.1

=== Elections in the 2000s ===
==== 2008 ====
2008 Australian Capital Territory election: Ginninderra
Party	Candidate	Votes	%	±%
Quota		10,009		
Labor	Jon Stanhope (elected 1)	13,461	22.4	−14.5
Labor	Mary Porter (elected 4)	3,719	6.2	+2.4
Labor	Adina Cirson	2,797	4.7	+4.7
Labor	David Peebles	2,711	4.5	+4.5
Labor	Chris Bourke	1,431	2.4	+2.4
Liberal	Alistair Coe (elected 3)	5,886	9.8	+9.8
Liberal	Vicki Dunne (elected 5)	4,237	7.1	+1.4
Liberal	Andrea Tokaji	2,553	4.3	+4.3
Liberal	Jacqui Myers	2,460	4.1	+4.1
Liberal	Matthew Watts	1,547	2.6	+2.6
Greens	Meredith Hunter (elected 2)	6,104	10.2	+5.1
Greens	James Higgins	2,246	3.7	+3.7
Independent	Mark Parton	3,785	6.3	+6.3
Motorist	Denis Walford	1,020	1.7	+1.7
Motorist	Andrew Simington	835	1.4	+1.4
Motorist	Chris Seddon	694	1.2	+1.2
Motorist	Wayne Whiting	622	1.0	+1.0
Motorist	Deborah Hannigan	513	0.9	+0.9
Community Alliance	Roger Nicoll	791	1.3	+1.3
Community Alliance	Jane Tullis	782	1.3	+1.3
Community Alliance	Mike Crowther	324	0.5	+0.5
Independent	Harold Hird	712	1.2	−0.8
Independent	Cathy McIlhoney	247	0.4	+0.4
	Darren Churchill	192	0.3	+0.3
Independent	Adam Verwey	170	0.3	+0.3
Independent	Barry Smith	118	0.2	+0.2
	Eddie Sarkis	92	0.2	+0.2
Total formal votes		60,049	96.0	−0.3
Informal votes		2,503	4.0	+0.3
Turnout		62,552	91.5	−2.1
Party total votes
Labor		24,119	40.2	−9.2
Liberal		16,683	27.8	−4.6
Greens		8,350	13.9	+5.7
Independent	Mark Parton	3,785	6.3	+6.3
Motorist		3,684	6.1	+6.1
Community Alliance		1,897	3.2	+3.2
Independent	Harold Hird	712	1.2	−0.8
Independent	Cathy McIlhoney	247	0.4	+0.4
	Darren Churchill	192	0.3	+0.3
Independent	Adam Verwey	170	0.3	+0.3
Independent	Barry Smith	118	0.2	+0.2
	Eddie Sarkis	92	0.2	+0.2

==== 2004 ====
2004 Australian Capital Territory election: Ginninderra
Party	Candidate	Votes	%	±%
Quota		9,901		
Labor	Jon Stanhope (elected 1)	21,929	36.92	+12.44
Labor	Wayne Berry (elected 4)	2,469	4.16	−2.97
Labor	Mary Porter (elected 5)	2,268	3.82	+3.82
Labor	Susan McCarthy	1,823	3.07	−1.63
Labor	Ross Maxwell	1,293	2.18	+2.18
Liberal	Bill Stefaniak (elected 2)	10,204	17.18	+3.59
Liberal	Vicki Dunne (elected 3)	3,367	5.67	+2.06
Liberal	Ilona Fraser	2,358	3.97	+0.18
Liberal	Briant Clark	1,836	3.06	+3.06
Liberal	Bob Sobey	1,504	3.06	+3.06
Greens	Meredith Hunter	3,030	5.10	+5.10
Greens	Ben O'Callaghan	1,855	3.12	+3.12
Democrats	Roslyn Dundas	2,180	3.67	−0.28
Democrats	Roberta Wood	263	0.44	+0.44
Harold Hird Independents	Harold Hird	1,170	1.97	−2.42
Harold Hird Independents	Julie-Anne Papathanasiou	201	0.34	+0.34
Liberal Democrats	Adam Porter	405	0.68	+0.68
Liberal Democrats	Rose Pappalado	318	0.54	+0.54
Free Range Canberra	Mike O'Shaughnessy	250	0.42	+0.42
Free Range Canberra	Anne Moore	201	0.34	+0.34
Non-party	Darcy Henry	197	0.33	+0.33
Non-party	John E. Gorman	85	0.14	+0.14
ACT Equality Party	John Simsons	197	0.33	+0.33
Total formal votes		59,403	97.28	+1.27
Informal votes		1,660	2.72	−1.27
Turnout		51,063	93.55	+1.84
Party total votes
Labor		29,782	50.14	+7.32
Liberal		19,269	32.44	+4.52
Greens		4,885	8.22	+0.28
Democrats		2,443	4.11	−5.60
Harold Hird Independents		1,371	2.31	+2.31
Liberal Democrats		723	1.22	−0.66
Free Range Canberra		451	0.76	+0.76
Non-party		282	0.47	+0.47
ACT Equality Party		197	0.33	+0.33
Labor hold		Swing	+12.44	
Labor hold		Swing	−2.97	
Labor gain from Democrats		Swing	+3.82	
Liberal hold		Swing	+3.59	
Liberal hold		Swing	+2.06	

==== 2001 ====
2001 Australian Capital Territory election: Ginninderra
Party	Candidate	Votes	%	±%
Quota		9,285		
Labor	Jon Stanhope (elected 1)	13,640	24.48	+16.43
Labor	Wayne Berry (elected 3)	3,973	7.13	−5.43
Labor	Susan McCarthy	2,617	4.70	+4.70
Labor	Vic Rebikoff	1,868	3.35	+3.35
Labor	Judith Downey	1,754	3.15	+3.15
Liberal	Bill Stefaniak (elected 2)	7,569	13.59	−2.11
Liberal	Harold Hird	2,443	4.39	−2.20
Liberal	Ilona Fraser	2,111	3.79	+3.79
Liberal	Vicki Dunne (elected 5)	2,013	3.61	−1.77
Liberal	Andrew Sarri	1,416	2.54	+2.54
Democrats	Roslyn Dundas (elected 4)	2,198	3.95	+3.95
Democrats	Dan McMillan	2,198	3.65	+3.65
Democrats	Anthony David	1,175	2.11	+2.11
Greens	Shane Rattenbury	3,045	5.47	+1.71
Greens	Patricia Woodcroft-Lee	1,381	2.48	+2.48
Dave Rugendyke	Dave Rugendyke	2,990	5.37	−2.50
Dave Rugendyke	Ian Brown	136	0.24	+0.24
Liberal Democrats	John Humphreys	775	1.39	+1.39
Liberal Democrats	Susan Morrissey	270	0.48	+0.48
Nurses	Rhonda James	704	1.26	+1.26
Independent	Chris Garvie	620	1.10	+1.10
Group F	Darcy Henry	356	0.64	+0.64
Group F	Geoff Clarke	113	0.20	+0.20
Gungahlin Equality Party	John Simsons	175	0.31	+0.31
Gungahlin Equality Party	Gail Jones	171	0.31	+0.31
Independent	Shaun Good	160	0.29	+0.29
Total formal votes		55,708	96.01	+0.65
Informal votes		2,314	3.99	−0.65
Turnout		58,022	91.71	−1.12
Party total votes
Labor		23,852	42.82	+13.21
Liberal		15,552	27.92	−5.27
Democrats		5,408	9.71	+2.54
Greens		4,426	7.94	−0.75
Dave Rugendyke		3,126	5.61	−4.02
Liberal Democrats		1,045	1.88	+1.88
Nurses		704	1.26	+1.26
Independent	Chris Garvie	620	1.10	+1.10
Group F		469	0.84	+0.84
Gungahlin Equality Party		346	0.62	+0.62
Independent	Shaun Good	160	0.29	+0.29
Labor hold		Swing	+16.43	
Labor hold		Swing	−5.43	
Liberal hold		Swing	−2.11	
Liberal hold		Swing	−1.77	
Democrats gain from Independent		Swing	+3.95	

=== Elections in the 1990s ===
==== 1998 ====
1998 Australian Capital Territory election: Ginninderra
Party	Candidate	Votes	%	±%
Quota		8,406		
Liberal	Bill Stefaniak (elected 1)	7,918	15.70	−0.07
Liberal	Harold Hird (elected 3)	3,322	6.59	−0.77
Liberal	Vicki Dunne	2,714	5.38	+5.38
Liberal	Terry Birtles	1,724	3.42	+3.42
Liberal	Warwick Gow	1,063	2.11	+2.11
Labor	Wayne Berry (elected 2)	6,335	12.56	−3.54
Labor	Jon Stanhope (elected 4)	4,061	8.05	+8.05
Labor	Roberta McRae	2,136	4.24	−1.68
Labor	Joy Nicholls	1,221	2.42	+2.42
Labor	Chris Sant	1,178	2.34	+2.34
Osborne Independent Group	Dave Rugendyke (elected 5)	3,971	7.87	+7.87
Osborne Independent Group	Hilary Back	885	1.75	+1.75
Greens	Shane Rattenbury	1,896	3.76	+3.76
Greens	Jennifer Palma	904	1.79	+1.79
Greens	Dierk Von Behrens	839	1.66	+1.66
Greens	Molly Wainwright	745	1.48	+1.48
Democrats	Jocelyn Bell	1,600	3.17	+3.17
Democrats	Peter Vandenbroek	758	1.50	+1.50
Democrats	Terry Holder	457	0.91	+0.91
Democrats	Stephen Selden	401	0.80	+0.80
Democrats	Alex Allars	398	0.79	+0.79
Independent	Manuel Xyrakis	1,856	3.68	+3.68
Independent	Helen Szuty	1,227	2.43	+2.43
Independent	Alice Chu	1,089	2.16	+2.16
Christian Democrats	John Richard Miller	627	1.24	+1.24
Christian Democrats	Ivan Young	295	0.58	+0.58
Group G	Cheryl Hill	402	0.80	+0.80
Group G	Derek Hill	35	0.07	+0.07
Progressive Labour	Renee Brooks	138	0.27	+0.27
Progressive Labour	Morgan Graham	102	0.20	+0.20
Independent	Connie Steven	136	0.27	+0.27
Total formal votes		50,433	95.36	+2.08
Informal votes		2,454	4.64	−2.08
Turnout		52,887	92.83	+2.27
Party total votes
Liberal		16,741	33.19	−7.50
Labor		14,931	29.61	−3.13
Osborne Independent Group		4,856	9.63	+9.63
Greens		4,384	8.69	−0.02
Democrats		3,614	7.17	+2.12
Independent	Manuel Xyrakis	1,856	3.68	+3.68
Independent	Helen Szuty	1,227	2.43	+2.43
Independent	Alice Chu	1,089	2.16	+2.16
Christian Democrats		922	1.83	+1.83
Group G		437	0.87	+0.87
Progressive Labour		240	0.48	+0.48
Independent	Connie Steven	136	0.27	+0.27
Liberal hold		Swing	−0.07	
Liberal hold		Swing	−0.77	
Labor hold		Swing	−3.54	
Labor hold		Swing	+8.05	
Osborne Independent Group gain from Greens		Swing	+7.87	

==== 1995 ====
1995 Australian Capital Territory election: Ginninderra
Party	Candidate	Votes	%	±%
Quota		7,990		
Liberal	Bill Stefaniak (elected 2)	7,559	15.77	NA
Liberal	Cheryl Hill	3,741	7.80	NA
Liberal	Harold Hird (elected 4)	3,526	7.36	NA
Liberal	Lyle Dunne	3,059	6.38	NA
Liberal	Martin Gordon	1,622	3.38	NA
Labor	Wayne Berry (elected 1)	7,719	16.10	NA
Labor	Roberta McRae (elected 3)	2,840	5.92	NA
Labor	Fiona Wilson	1,967	4.10	NA
Labor	Ellnor Grassby	1,912	3.99	NA
Labor	Jacqueline Shea	1,255	2.62	NA
Greens	Lucy Horodny (elected 5)	2,332	4.86	NA
Greens	Michelle Rielly	1,000	2.09	NA
Greens	Gary Corr	844	1.76	NA
Moore Independents	Helen Szuty	2,575	5.37	NA
Moore Independents	Graeme Evans	1,262	2.63	NA
Democrats	Peter Main	1,740	3.63	NA
Democrats	Peter Granleese	680	1.42	NA
Smokers Are Voters And Civil Rights	Lorraine Bevan	672	1.40	NA
Smokers Are Voters And Civil Rights	Donovan Ballard	575	1.20	NA
Independent	Kevin Connor	1,059	2.21	NA
Total formal votes		47,939	93.28	NA
Informal votes		3,455	6.72	NA
Turnout		51,394	90.56	NA
Party total votes
Liberal		19,507	40.69	NA
Labor		15,693	32.74	NA
Greens		4,176	8.71	NA
Moore Independents		3,837	8.00	NA
Democrats		2,420	5.05	NA
Smokers Are Voters And Civil Rights		1,247	2.60	NA
Independent	Kevin Connor	1,059	2.21	NA
Liberal win		(new seat)		
Liberal win		(new seat)		
Labor win		(new seat)		
Labor win		(new seat)		
Greens win		(new seat)		
