= 2016 Australian Capital Territory election =

- 15 October 2016

All 25 seats of the Australian Capital Territory Legislative Assembly 13 seats needed for a majority
- Turnout: 88.5 (▼0.9 pp)
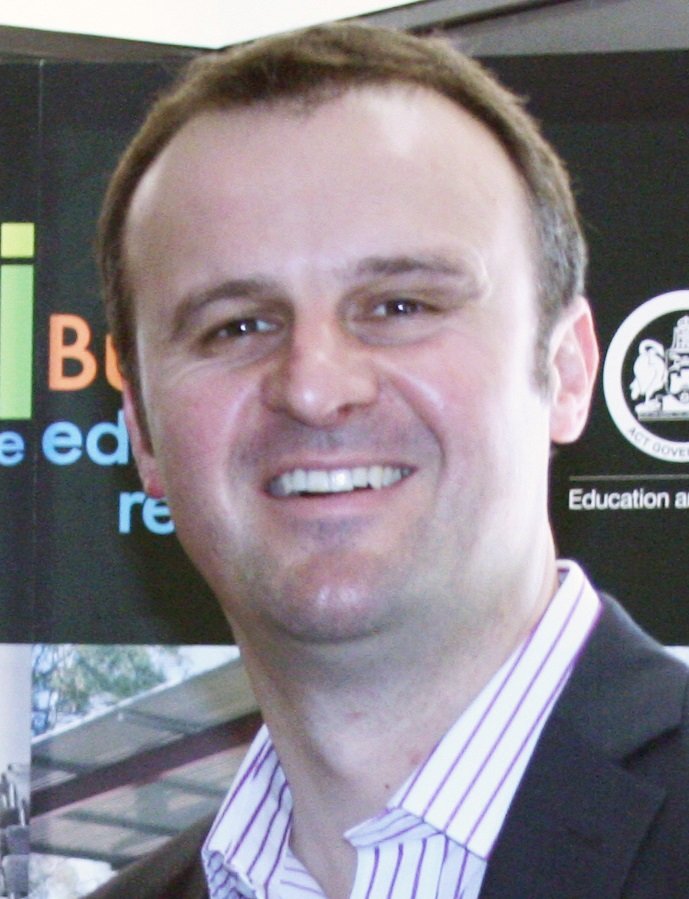

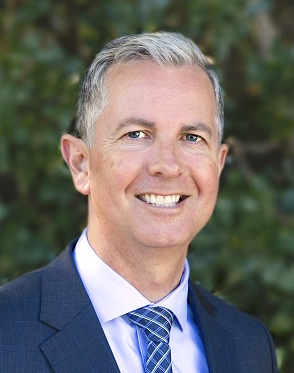

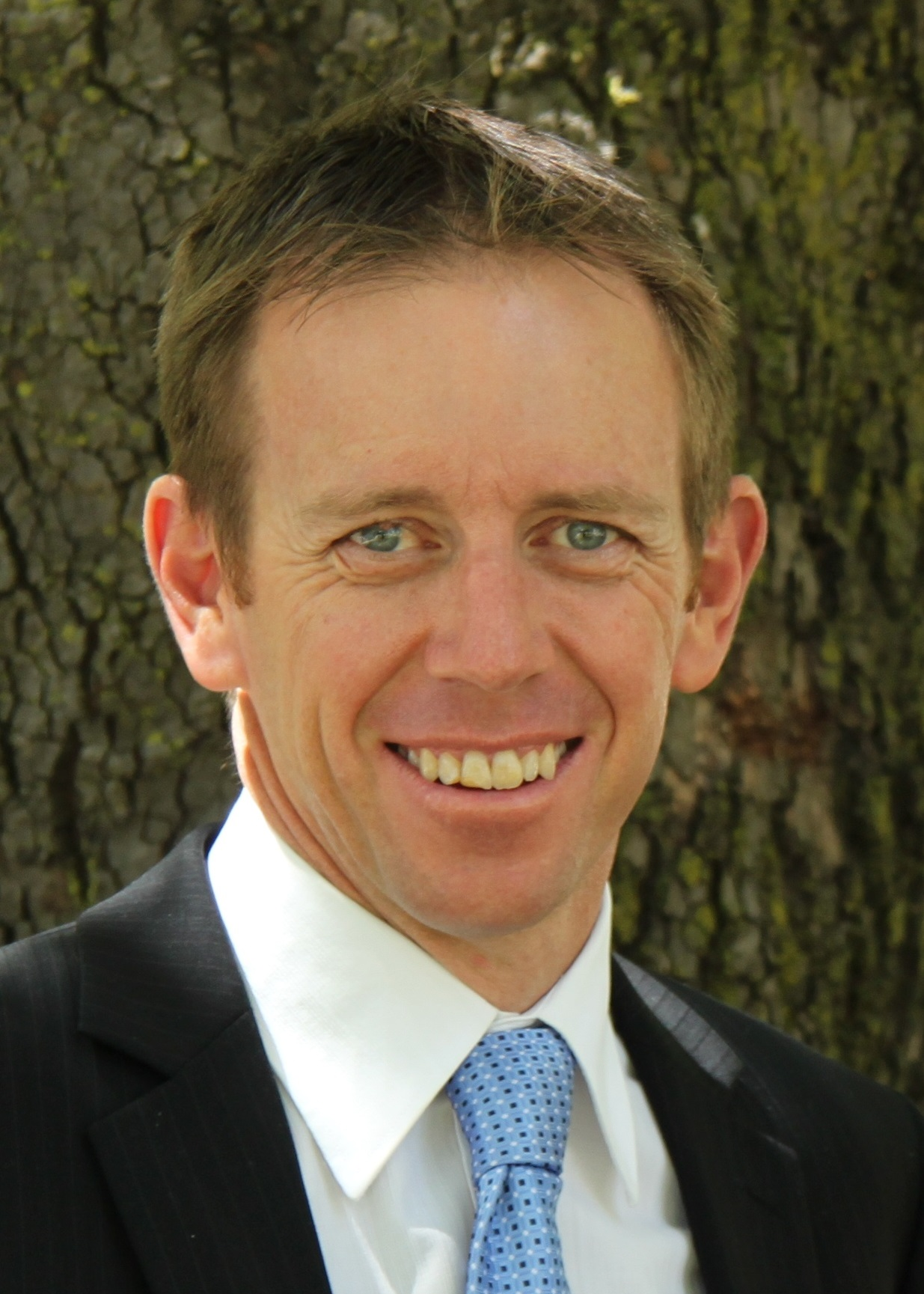
	First party	Second party	Third party
Leader	Andrew Barr	Jeremy Hanson	Shane Rattenbury
Party	Labor	Liberal	Greens
Leader since	11 December 2014	11 February 2013	20 October 2012
Leader's seat	Kurrajong	Murrumbidgee	Kurrajong
Last election	8 seats, 38.9%	8 seats, 38.9%	1 seat, 10.7%
Seats won	12	11	2
Seat change	▲4	▲3	▲1
Primary vote	93,811	89,632	25,096
Percentage	38.4%	36.7%	10.3%
Swing	▼0.5	▼2.2	▼0.5
- Results by electorate
Chief Minister before election
Andrew Barr
Labor–Greens Coalition
Elected Chief Minister
Andrew Barr
Labor–Greens Coalition

A general election for the Australian Capital Territory Legislative Assembly was held on Saturday, 15 October 2016.

The 15-year incumbent Labor Party, led by Chief Minister Andrew Barr, won a fifth term over the main opposition Liberal Party, led by opposition leader Jeremy Hanson. On election night, ABC analyst Antony Green predicted that Labor would once again form a minority government with the support of the Greens, with Liberal leader Hanson saying in a speech it would be very difficult for the Liberals to win government. On 22 October, the final list of elected candidates was confirmed; the Labor Party winning 12 seats, the Liberal Party 11 seats and the Greens 2 seats. Labor and the Greens subsequently signed off on a formal Parliamentary Agreement, which outlined shared policy priorities and allowed Greens leader Shane Rattenbury to retain a seat in the Cabinet whilst mandating that the Greens not move or support any motion of no confidence in the Labor Government, except in instances of gross misconduct or corruption.

Prior to this election, candidates were elected to fill all 17 Legislative Assembly seats in the unicameral parliament which consisted of three multi-member electorates, Brindabella (five seats), Ginninderra (five seats) and Molonglo (seven seats), using a proportional representation single transferable vote method known as the Hare-Clark system. On 5 August 2014, the Assembly voted to increase the size of the Assembly to 25 members, elected from five electorates of five seats each. The Hare-Clark system continued. The election was conducted by the ACT Electoral Commission.

Of the 25 elected members, 13 were women, representing the first female parliamentary majority in Australian history.

== Results ==
Party	Votes	%	+/–	Seats	+/–
Labor	93,811	38.43	▼0.45	12	▲4
Liberal	89,632	36.72	▼2.18	11	▲3
Greens	25,096	10.28	▼0.47	2	▲1
Independents	10,835	4.44	▲2.61	0	0
Sex Party	7,474	3.06	▲3.06	0	0
Liberal Democrats	5,028	2.06	▲1.00	0	0
Sustainable Australia	3,831	1.57	▲1.57	0	0
Animal Justice	3,681	1.51	▲1.51	0	0
Like Canberra	2,624	1.07	New	0	0
Canberra Community Voters	1,703	0.70	New	0	0
Community Alliance	413	0.17	New	0	0
Total	244,128	100.00	–	25	–
Valid votes	244,128	97.47			
Invalid/blank votes	6,332	2.53	▼1.0		
Total votes	250,460	100.00	–		
Registered voters/turnout	283,162	88.45	▼0.9		

=== Primary vote by electorate ===
Results by electorate
	Brindabella			Ginninderra			Kurrajong			Murrumbidgee			Yerrabi		
Party	Votes	%	Seats	Votes	%	Seats	Votes	%	Seats	Votes	%	Seats	Votes	%	Seats
Labor	15,744	33.6	2	19,494	41.4	3	18,796	38.5	2	17,265	34.5	2	22,512	43.9	3
Liberal	19,606	41.9	3	15,095	32.0	2	15,140	31.0	2	21,425	42.8	2	18,366	35.8	2
Greens	2,399	5.1	0	4,573	9.7	0	9,165	18.8	1	5,325	10.6	1	3,634	7.1	0
Independent	1,967	4.2	0	4,580	9.7	0	2,135	4.4	0	687	1.4	0	1,466	2.9	0
Sex Party	3,694	7.9	0	—	—	—	—	—	—	1,746	3.5	0	2,034	4.0	0
Liberal Democrats	1,175	2.5	0	587	1.2	0	1,057	2.2	0	813	1.6	0	1,396	2.7	0
Sustainable Australia	697	1.5	0	1,105	2.3	0	645	1.3	0	652	1.3	0	732	1.4	0
Animal Justice	1,106	2.4	0	444	0.9	0	602	1.2	0	1,071	2.1	0	458	0.9	0
Like Canberra	442	0.9	0	450	1.0	0	419	0.9	0	658	1.3	0	655	1.3	0
Community Voters	—	—	—	814	1.7	0	889	1.8	0	—	—	—	—	—	—
Community Alliance	—	—	—	—	—	—	—	—	—	413	0.8	0	—	—	—

=== Final distribution of seats ===
Electorate	Seats held
Brindabella	
Ginninderra	
Kurrajong	
Murrumbidgee	
Yerrabi	

Labor
Liberal
Green

=== New MLAs ===
Since the 2012 election, the total number of seats in the assembly had increased from 17 seats (across two five-seat electorates and one seven-seat electorate) to 25 seats (across five five-seat electorates). This has resulted in twelve new MPs being elected (eight to the new seats, two replacing Simon Corbell and Val Jeffery, who retired, and two replacing Chris Bourke and Jayson Hinder, who were defeated at the election).

Name	Party	Seat
Mark Parton	Liberal	Brindabella
Tara Cheyne	Labor	Ginninderra
Elizabeth Kikkert	Liberal	Ginninderra
Gordon Ramsay	Labor	Ginninderra
Rachel Stephen-Smith	Labor	Kurrajong
Elizabeth Lee	Liberal	Kurrajong
Bec Cody	Labor	Murrumbidgee
Chris Steel	Labor	Murrumbidgee
Caroline Le Couteur	Green	Murrumbidgee
Suzanne Orr	Labor	Yerrabi
Michael Pettersson	Labor	Yerrabi
James Milligan	Liberal	Yerrabi

== Key dates ==
- Last day to lodge applications for party register: 30 June 2016
- Party registration closed: 8 September 2016
- Pre-election period commenced and nominations opened: 9 September 2016
- Rolls close: 16 September 2016
- Nominations close: 21 September 2016
- Nominations declared and ballot paper order determined: 22 September 2016
- Pre-poll voting commences: 27 September 2016
- Polling day: 15 October 2016
- Last day for receipt of postal votes: 21 October 2016

== Background ==
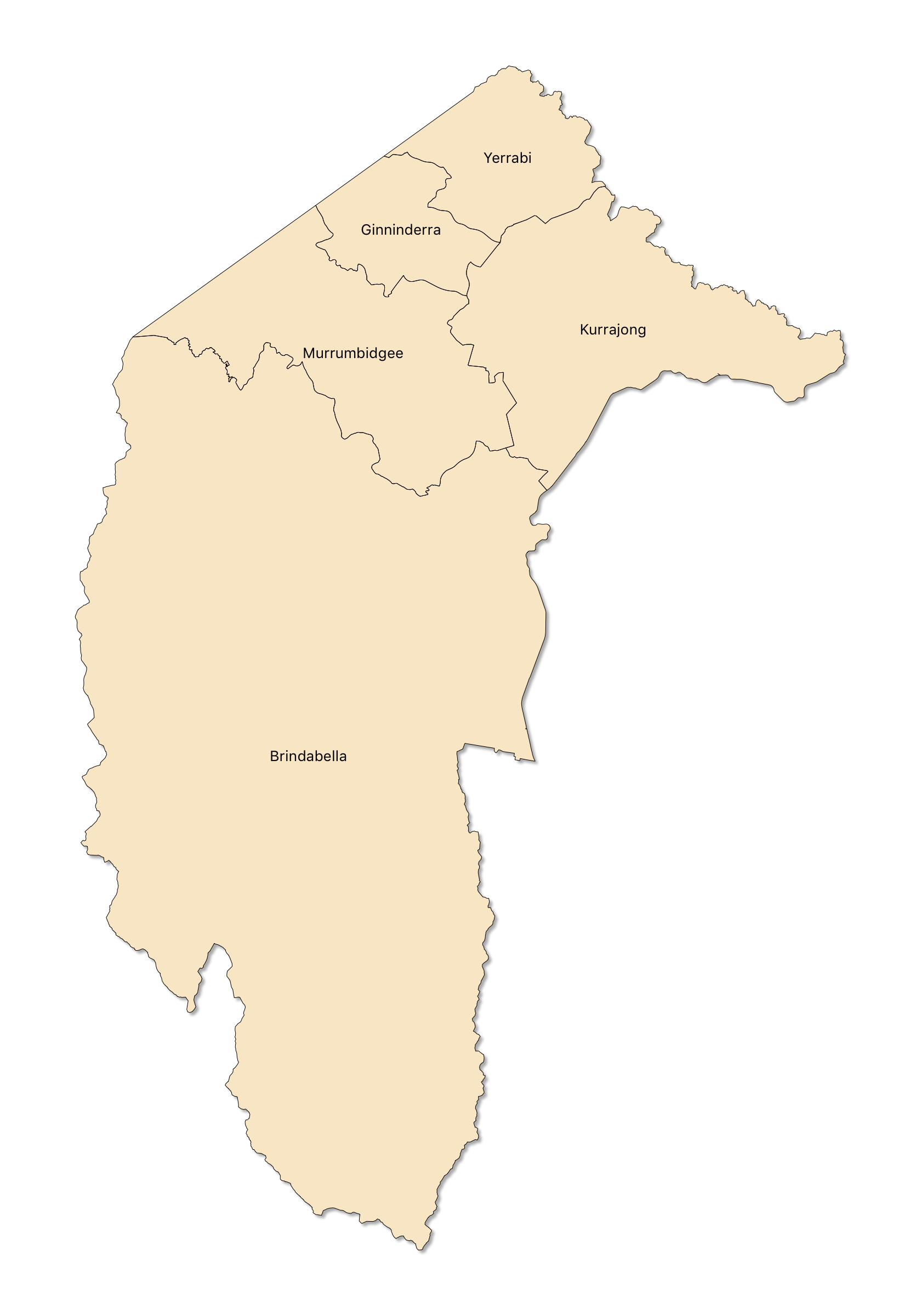
Electorates from the 2016 election.

The incumbent Labor Party led by Chief Minister Andrew Barr attempted to win re-election for a fifth term in the unicameral ACT Legislative Assembly. Labor, led by Katy Gallagher, formed a minority coalition government with the Greens after the 2012 election, where Labor won 8 seats, Liberal 8 seats, Greens 1 seat. The Greens retained their balance of power in the election despite losing the majority of their 4-seat representation, with sole remaining representative Shane Rattenbury entering the cabinet to form a coalition government. Gallagher resigned as Chief Minister and Labor leader on 5 December 2014 to enter the Senate in the vacancy left by Kate Lundy. She was replaced by her deputy Andrew Barr on 11 December 2014.

The opposition, the Liberal Party, also had a change in leadership. Zed Seselja, the leader of the party since 2007, stood down on 11 February 2013, to challenge Liberal Party pre-selection for the Senate at the 2013 federal election. Seselja eventually won his pre-selection bid, and was elected Senator for the Australian Capital Territory at the federal election. He was replaced as leader of the Liberal Party by Jeremy Hanson.

All members of the unicameral Assembly faced re-election, with members being elected by the Hare-Clark system of proportional representation. The Assembly was previously divided into three electorates: five-member Brindabella (including Tuggeranong and parts of the Woden Valley) and Ginninderra (including Belconnen and suburbs) and seven-member Molonglo (including North Canberra, South Canberra, Gungahlin, Weston Creek, and the remainder of the Woden Valley). These electorates, were redistributed following the increase in the size of the Assembly to 25 seats.

At the end of May 2015, the following electorates were announced:

- Brindabella – contains the district of Tuggeranong (except the suburb of Kambah).
- Ginninderra – contains the district of Belconnen (except the suburbs of Evatt, Giralang, Kaleen, McKellar and Lawson).
- Kurrajong – contains the districts of Canberra Central and Majura
- Murrumbidgee – contains the districts of the Woden Valley, Weston Creek, Molonglo Valley and the Tuggeranong suburb of Kambah.
- Yerrabi – contains the districts of Gungahlin, Hall and the Belconnen suburbs of Evatt, Giralang, Kaleen, McKellar and Lawson.

Election dates are set in statute with four-year fixed terms, to be held on the third Saturday of October every four years.

=== Campaign ===
The opposition Liberal Party opposed the Light rail in Canberra project, so did the Like Canberra and Sustainable Australia. In April 2015, the Liberal party announced it would cancel any contracts for the light rail if it won the 2016 ACT election. A year out from the poll, the light rail project was already predicted to be the election's major issue. As predicted, the light rail project was the major issue of the campaign. The election saw the Labor government returned, with the party claiming the result as an endorsement of the project.

== Candidates ==
=== Registered parties ===
Twelve parties were registered with the ACT Electoral Commission as eligible for the October 2016 election, ten of which nominated candidates for the election.

- Animal Justice Party
- Australian Labor Party (ACT Branch)
- Australian Sex Party ACT
- Canberra Community Voters
- Liberal Democratic Party
- Liberal Party
- Like Canberra
- Sustainable Australia (ACT)
- The ACT Greens
- The Community Alliance Party (ACT)
- The Flux Party – ACT (did not contest)
- VoteCanberra (did not contest)

=== Retiring members ===
==== Labor ====
- Simon Corbell (Molonglo)

==== Liberal ====
- Val Jeffery (Brindabella)

=== Brindabella ===
Five seats were up for election.

Labor candidates	Liberal candidates	Greens candidates	Animal Justice candidates	Liberal Democrats candidates
Joy Burch*; Angie Drake; Mick Gentleman*; Karl Maftoum; Taimus Werner-Gibbings	Ed Cocks; Annette Fazey-Southwell; Nicole Lawder*; Mark Parton*; Andrew Wall*	Johnathan Davis; Michael Mazengarb; Ben Murphy	Sarah O'Brien; Robyn Soxsmith	Matt Donnelly; Jacob Gowor; Greg Renet; Vera Saragih; Matt Straschko
Like Canberra candidates	Sex Party candidates	Sustainable candidates	Ungrouped candidates	
Timothy Friel; Richard Tuffin	Steven Bailey; Monique Shepherd	Claude Hastir; Melissa Kemp	Andrew Holt (Ind); Joel McKay (Ind)	

=== Ginninderra ===
Five seats were up for election.

Labor candidates	Liberal candidates	Greens candidates	CCV candidates	Liberal Democrats candidates
Yvette Berry*; Chris Bourke; Tara Cheyne*; Kim Fischer; Gordon Ramsay*	Vicki Dunne*; Denise Fisher; Elizabeth Kikkert*; Ignatius Rozario; Paul Sweeney	Jason Chappel; Indra Esguerra; Richard Merzian	Beth Gooch; Mick Kaye; Geoff Kettle; Gilbert Reilly; Alan Tutt	Naomi Gowor; Guy Jakeman
Like Canberra candidates	Sustainable candidates	Ungrouped candidates		
Richard Harriss; Sam Huggins	Geoff Buckmaster; Martin Tye	Bernie Brennan (AJP); Ian Coombes (Ind); Vijay Dubey (Ind); David Edwards (Ind); Emmanuel Ezekiel-Hart (Ind); Kim Huynh (Ind); Vanessa Jones (Ind); Leigh Watson (Ind); Lea Zangl (Ind)		

=== Kurrajong ===
Five seats were up for election.

Labor candidates	Liberal candidates	Greens candidates	CCV candidates	Liberal Democrats candidates
Andrew Barr*; Josh Ceramidas; Leah Dwyer; Richard Niven; Rachel Stephen-Smith*	Candice Burch; Brooke Curtin; Steve Doszpot*; Elizabeth Lee*; Peter McKay	Shane Rattenbury*; Jill Thomsen; Rebecca Vassarotti	Richard Farmer; Mike Hettinger; Lucinda Spier	Mark Ellis; Michael O'Rourke; Hugh Upton
Like Canberra candidates	Sustainable candidates	Ungrouped candidates		
Chris Bucknell; Maryann Mussared	John Haydon; Oliver Tye	Jeff Isaacs (AJP); Marea Fatseas (Ind); Peter Robinson (Ind); Graeme Strachan (Ind)		

=== Murrumbidgee ===
Five seats were up for election.

Labor candidates	Liberal candidates	Greens candidates	Animal Justice candidates	Community Alliance candidates
Bec Cody*; Mark Kulasingham; Brendan Long; Jennifer Newman; Chris Steel*	Jessica Adelan-Langford; Jeremy Hanson*; Peter Hosking; Paul House; Giulia Jones*	Emma Davidson; Jennifer Faerber; Caroline Le Couteur*	Deborah Field; Jessica Montagne	Michael Lindfield; Nancy-Louise Scherger
Liberal Democrats candidates	Like Canberra candidates	Sustainable candidates	Ungrouped candidates	
Fergus Brown; Brendan Cumpston; Roman Gowor; Tom Hamer; Alexander Klinkon	Shelley Dickerson; Rod Vickers	Jill Mail; Mark O'Connor	Robbie Swan (Sex); Margaret Webber (Ind); Brendan Whyte (Ind)	

=== Yerrabi ===
Five seats were up for election.

Labor candidates	Liberal candidates	Greens candidates	Liberal Democrats candidates	Like Canberra
Meegan Fitzharris*; Deepak-Raj Gupta; Jayson Hinder; Suzanne Orr*; Michael Pettersson*	Alistair Coe*; Amanda Lynch; James Milligan*; Justin States; Jacob Vadakkedathu	Andrew Braddock; Tobias Holm; Veronica Wensing	Dave Green; Declan Keating	Tim Bohm; Casey Heffernan
Sex Party candidates	Sustainable candidates	Ungrouped candidates		
Andrew Dewson; Susie Kennett	Paul Gabriel; Violet Sheridan	Mandy Cottingham (AJP); Daniel Evans; David Pollard (Ind)		

== Newspaper endorsements ==
Newspaper	Endorsement
The Canberra Times	Liberal

== See also ==
- Labor–Greens coalition
- 2012 Australian Capital Territory election
- Members of the Australian Capital Territory Legislative Assembly, 2012–2016
