= Michael Pettersson =

Australian politician (born 1991)

Michael Pettersson MLA
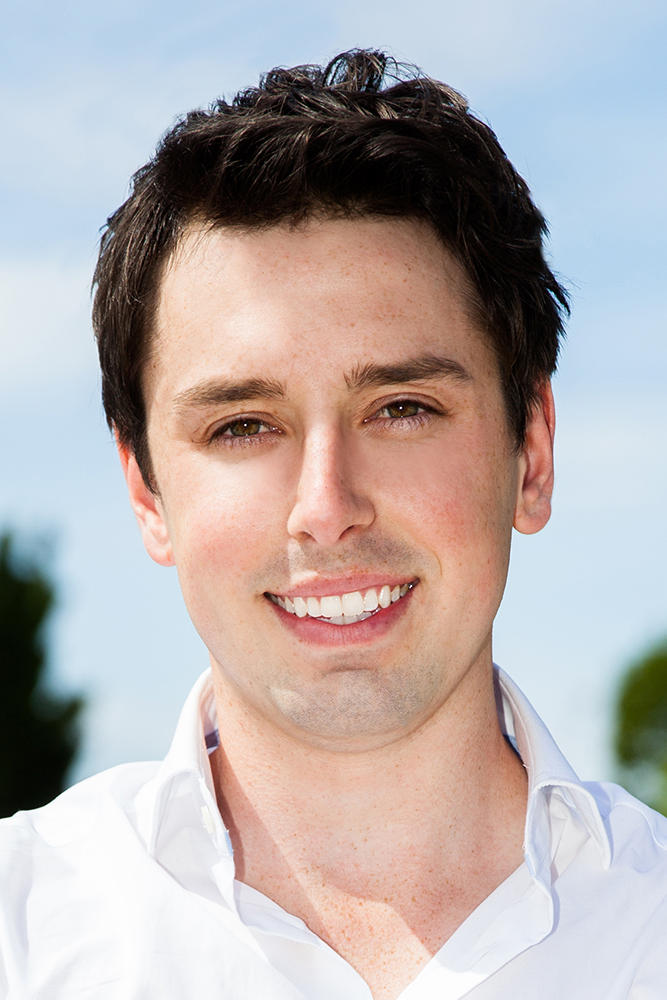

Member of the Australian Capital Territory Legislative Assembly for Yerrabi
- Incumbent
- Assumed office 15 October 2016
- Preceded by: Division created

Personal details
- Born: 1991 (age 34–35)
- Party: ACT Labor
- Education: Australian National University
- Occupation: Trade unionist
- Website: www.michaelpettersson.com.au

Michael Hugh Pettersson (born 1991) is an Australian politician. He has been a Member of the Legislative Assembly of the Australian Capital Territory since 2016 when he was elected as the Labor Party representative for the newly formed electorate of Yerrabi.

== Early life and career ==
Pettersson was raised in Canberra and studied at the Australian National University. During this time he became involved in student politics, serving as the ACT Branch President of the National Union of Students and President of the ANU Sport & Recreation Association. He also served as President of ACT Young Labor. After graduating, he worked as a trade unionist for the Construction, Forestry, Mining and Energy Union.

== Political career ==
Pettersson contested the seat of Yerrabi in the 2016 ACT election and received 4,817 primary votes or 0.6 of a quota. In the campaign, he drew attention for his creative use of social media. He was elected in third position in the five member Yerrabi electorate behind Meegan Fitzharris and Alistair Coe. In the 2020 ACT election, Pettersson was elected second behind former Liberal Leader, Alistair Coe, with 5,084 votes.

He is currently the Chair of the Standing Committee for Education and Community Inclusion, the Deputy Chair of the Public Accounts Committee and a member of the Health and Community Wellbeing Committee.

In Pettersson's inaugural speech he highlighted growing intergenerational inequality, the importance of education, and the dangers of casualisation in the workforce.

Pettersson has campaigned for more light rail services and the expansion of the popular Canberra e-scooters to his electorate of Yerrabi. In April 2021, Pettersson put forward a motion calling on the ACT Government to improve the facilities at Yerrabi Pond following the ACT Legislative Assembly e-petition he sponsored, which gained cross-party support.

Former a member of Centre Coalition (Labor Right), Pettersson crossed to the Left faction in 2018.

=== Cannabis decriminalisation ===
In September 2018, Pettersson introduced a historic bill to decriminalise the possession and personal use of small amounts of cannabis in the ACT. This Bill was passed by the ACT Legislative Assembly on the 25th of September 2019, making the ACT the first jurisdiction to decriminalise cannabis in Australia.

=== Drug decriminalisation ===
In February 2021, Pettersson introduced a bill into the ACT Legislative Assembly to decriminalise small quantities of some drugs. Under this proposed legislation certain drugs such as MDMA, cocaine, methamphetamine and heroin would be decriminalised in small quantities for personal use and possession. The Legislative Assembly is currently undertaking an Inquiry into the Bill which will be reported on in October 2021.

== Personal life ==
One of Pettersson's hobbies is chess. He became the first politician to play in the 25th Australian National University Chess Open in Canberra. Pettersson also enjoys mountain biking, yoga and the US TV Show 'Survivor'.
