= Lucille Hamilton =

Australian basketball player

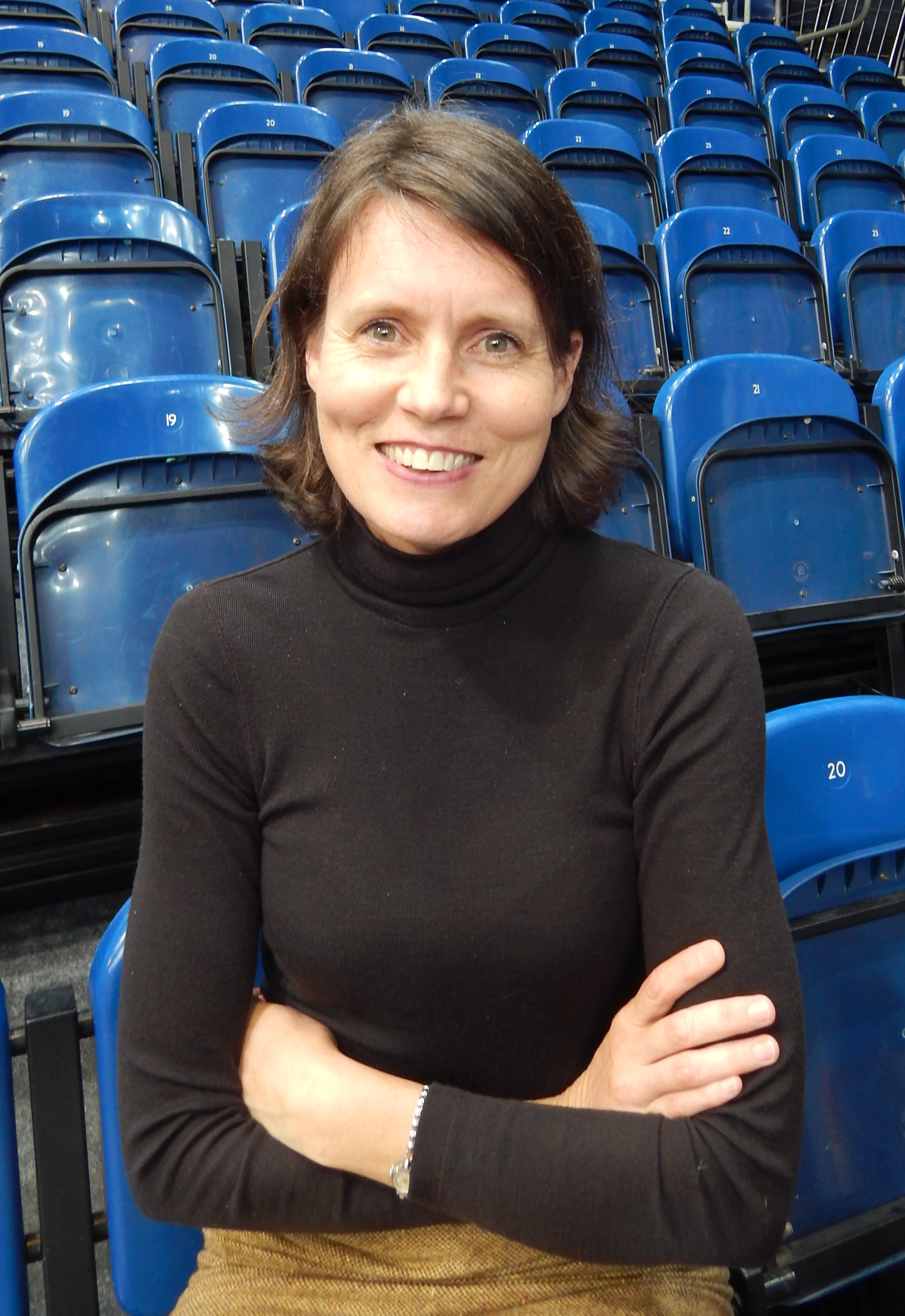
- Bailie in November 2015

Personal information
- Born: 25 May 1969 (age 57) Melbourne, Victoria
Medal record
Women's Basketball
Representing Australia
Junior World Championships
Bronze medal – third place	1989 Spain	Team competition

Lucille Maree Hamilton (born 25 May 1969) is a former Australian women's basketball player. Her married name is Lucille Bailie.

== Biography ==
Hamilton played for the Australia women's national basketball team during the late 1980s and early 1990s and competed for Australia at the 1990 World Championship in Brazil. Hamilton also represented Australia at the 1989 World Championship for Junior Women held in Spain, where she won a bronze medal.

In the domestic Women's National Basketball League (WNBL), Hamilton played 377 games for the Dandenong Rangers and Canberra Capitals. This equalled the all-time record held with Rachael Sporn, until it was broken by the Canberra Capitals' Jess Bibby on 14 November 2015. In 1988, Hamilton won the inaugural Australian WNBL Youth Player of the Year, now known as the Betty Watson Rookie of the Year. In 1998, Hamilton was awarded Life Membership to the WNBL. Hamilton's younger sister, Jacinta Hamilton, also played for the national basketball team at the 2006 Commonwealth Games in Melbourne.

She ran as a Liberal Party candidate in the 2004 Australian Capital Territory election, but was not elected.

She served as general manager of the Canberra Capitals for seven years, stepping down in February 2025.

== See also ==
- WNBL Rookie of the Year Award
