= 2004 Australian Capital Territory election =

← 2001	16 October 2004	2008 →

All 17 seats of the Australian Capital Territory Legislative Assembly 9 seats needed for a majority
- Turnout: 92.8 (▲1.9 pp)
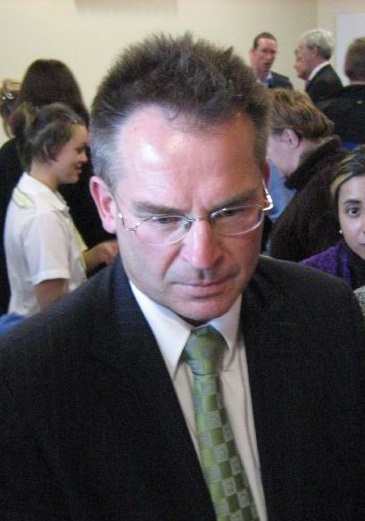

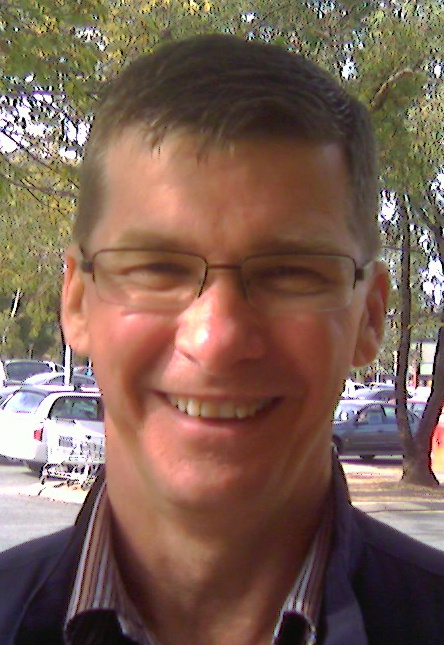

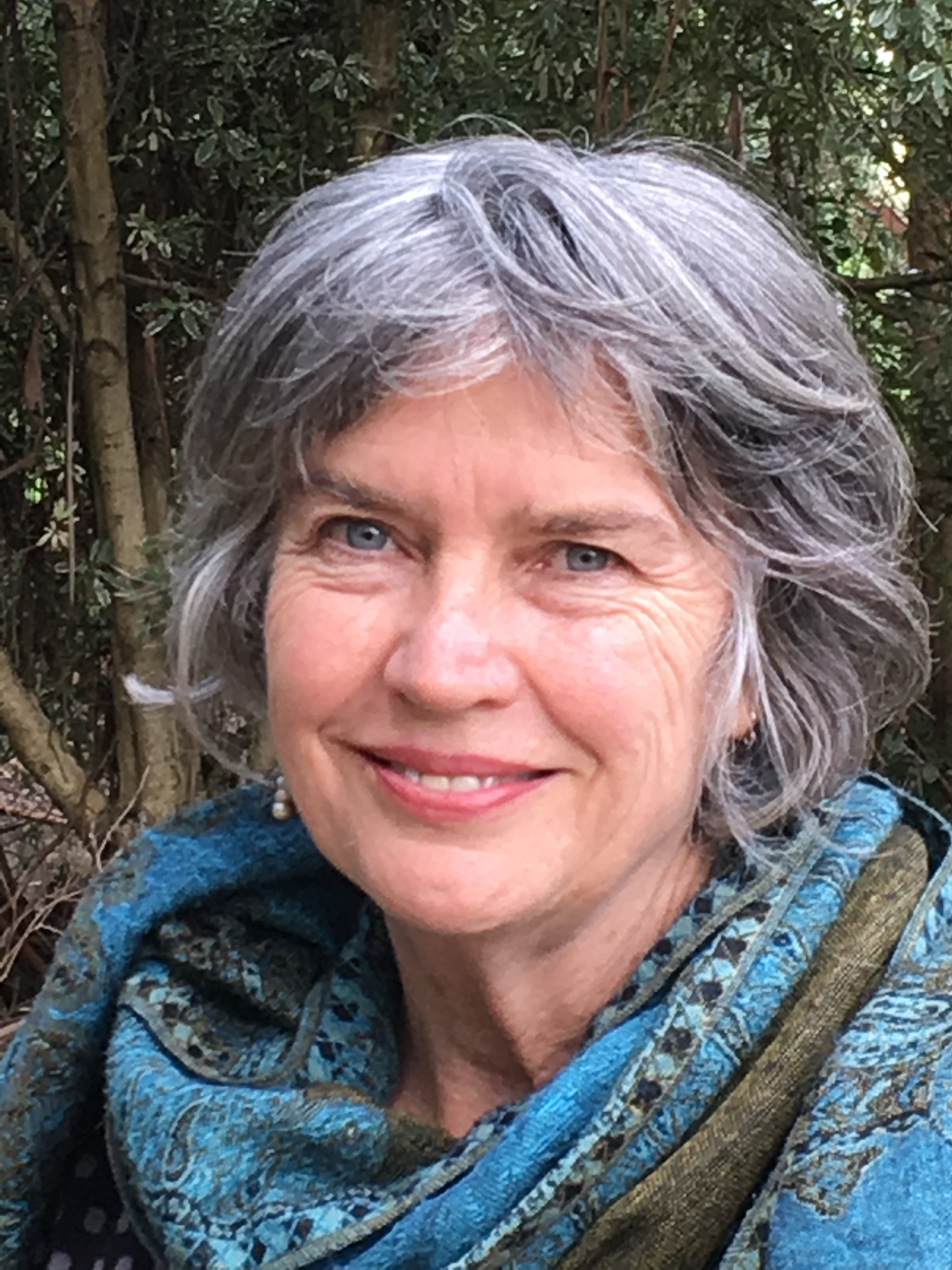
	First party	Second party	Third party
Leader	Jon Stanhope	Brendan Smyth	Kerrie Tucker
Party	Labor	Liberal	Greens
Leader since	19 March 1998	25 November 2002	21 February 1998
Leader's seat	Ginninderra	Molonglo	Molonglo (did not contest)
Last election	8 seats	7 seats	1 seat
Seats won	9	7	1
Seat change	▲1	Steady	Steady
Primary vote	95,635	71,083	18,997
Percentage	46.8%	34.8%	9.3%
Swing	▲5.1	▲3.2	▲0.2
- Results by electorate
Chief Minister before election
Jon Stanhope
Labor
Elected Chief Minister
Jon Stanhope
Labor

Elections to the Australian Capital Territory Legislative Assembly were held on Saturday, 16 October 2004. The incumbent Labor Party, led by Jon Stanhope, was challenged by the Liberal Party, led by Brendan Smyth. Candidates were elected to fill three multi-member electorates using a single transferable vote method, known as the Hare-Clark system.

The result was a clear majority of nine seats in the 17-member unicameral Assembly for Labor. It marked the first and so far only time in the history of ACT self-government that one party was able to win a majority in its own right. Stanhope was elected Chief Minister at the first sitting of the sixth Assembly on 4 November 2004. The election was conducted by the ACT Electoral Commission and was the second time in Australia's history that an electronic voting and counting system was used for some, but not all, polling places, expanding on the initial trial of the system at the 2001 ACT election.

== Key dates ==
2004 election timetable
Date	Event
30 June 2004	Last day to lodge applications for party register
9 September 2004	Party registration closed
10 September 2004	Pre-election period commenced and nominations opened
17 September 2004	Rolls closed
22 September 2004	Nominations closed
23 September 2004	Nominations declared and ballot paper order determined
27 September 2004	Pre-poll voting commenced
16 October 2004	Polling day
27 October 2004	Scrutiny completed
29 October 2004	Poll declared
4 November 2004	Legislative Assembly formed

== Overview ==
The incumbent centre-left Labor Party, led by Chief Minister Jon Stanhope, attempted to win re-election for a second term after coming to power in 2001. Labor was challenged by the opposition centre-right Liberal Party, led by Brendan Smyth, who assumed the Liberal leadership in November 2002. A third party, the ACT Greens, held one seat in the Assembly through retiring member, Kerrie Tucker.

The election saw all 17 members of the Assembly face re-election, with members being elected by the Hare-Clark system of proportional representation. The Assembly is divided into three electorates: five-member Brindabella (including Tuggeranong and parts of the Woden Valley) and Ginninderra (including Belconnen and suburbs) and seven-member Molonglo (including North Canberra, South Canberra, Gungahlin, Weston Creek, and the remainder of the Woden Valley). Election dates are set in statute to occur once every four years; the government has no ability to set the election date.

Following the 2001 election outcome, Labor held eight seats; the opposition Liberal Party held seven seats; with the Greens holding a further one seat; and the Democrats also holding one seat. In September 2002, Helen Cross resigned from the Liberal Party, and remained in the Assembly, sitting as an independent. Gary Humphries, the former Liberal leader, resigned from the Assembly on 25 November 2002 to fill a casual vacancy in the Australian Senate following the resignation of Margaret Reid. Humphries was replaced in the Assembly by Jacqui Burke who was sworn in on 18 February 2003.

== Candidates ==
Sitting members at the time of the election are listed in bold. Tickets that elected at least one MLA are highlighted in the relevant colour. Successful candidates are indicated by an asterisk (*).

=== Retiring Members ===
==== Labor ====
- Bill Wood (Brindabella)

==== Liberal ====
- Greg Cornwell (Molonglo)

=== Brindabella ===
Five seats were up for election. The Labor Party was defending three seats. The Liberal Party was defending two seats.

Labor candidates	Liberal candidates	Greens candidates	Democrats candidates	LDP candidates	CDP candidates	Ungrouped candidates
Mick Gentleman*; **John Hargreaves***; Paschal Leahy; Rebecca Logue; **Karin MacDonald***	Steve Doszpot; **Steve Pratt***; Megan Purcell; Karen Schilling; **Brendan Smyth***	Graham Jensen; Kathryn Kelly	Rowena Bew; Marc Emerson	David Garrett; Matthew Harding	Erol Byrne; Thelma Janes	Burl Doble (Ind); Stephanie Elliott (FRC); Lance Muir (EQP)

=== Ginninderra ===
Five seats were up for election. The Labor Party was defending two seats. The Liberal Party was defending two seats. The Australian Democrats were defending one seat.

Labor candidates	Liberal candidates	Greens candidates	Democrats candidates	LDP candidates	Hird Inds candidates	Free Range candidates
**Wayne Berry***; Ross Maxwell; Susan McCarthy; Mary Porter*; **Jon Stanhope***	Briant Clark; **Vicki Dunne***; Ilona Fraser; Bob Sobey; **Bill Stefaniak***	Meredith Hunter; Ben O'Callaghan	**Roslyn Dundas**; Roberta Wood	Rose Pappalardo; Adam Porter	Harold Hird; Julie-Anne Papathanasiou	Anne Moore; Mike O'Shaughnessy
Group E candidates	Ungrouped candidates					
John Gorman; Darcy Henry	John Simsons (EQP)					

=== Molonglo ===
Seven seats were up for election. The Labor Party was defending three seats. The Liberal Party had won three seats in 2001 but after Helen Cross's departure from the party in 2002 was defending two seats. The Greens were defending one seat. Helen Cross was also defending her seat with an independent list.

Labor candidates	Liberal candidates	Greens candidates	Democrats candidates	LDP candidates	Cross Inds candidates	Free Range candidates
Andrew Barr; Adina Cirson; **Simon Corbell***; **Katy Gallagher***; Mike Hettinger; **Ted Quinlan***; Kim Sattler	Lucille Bailie; **Jacqui Burke***; Ron Forrester; David Kibbey; Richard Mulcahy*; Gordon Scott; Zed Seselja*	Amanda Bresnan; Deb Foskey*; Charlie Pahlman	Fred Leftwich; Robert Rose	John Humphreys; Melanie Sutcliffe	**Helen Cross**; Renee Stramandinoli	Simone Gray; Jo McKinley
Equality candidates	Group C candidates	Ungrouped candidates				
Nancy-Louise McCullough; Jonathon Reynolds	John Farrell; Robert Fearn	Tony Farrell; Luke Garner; Ken Helm; Kurt Kennedy				

== Results ==
Party	Votes	%	+/–	Seats	+/–
Labor	95,635	46.84	▲5.12	9	▲1
Liberal	71,083	34.81	▲3.17	7	0
Greens	18,997	9.30	▲0.20	1	1
Democrats	4,595	2.25	▼5.79	0	▼1
Independents	3,773	1.85	▼0.16	0	0
Liberal Democratic Party	2,666	1.31	▲0.33	0	0
Helen Cross Independents	2,608	1.28	New	0	New
Free Range Canberra	1,429	0.70	New	0	New
Harold Hird Independents	1,370	0.67	New	0	New
Christian Democrats	1,370	0.67	▲0.67	0	0
ACT Equality Party	662	0.32	New	0	New
Total	204,188	100.00	–	17	–
Valid votes	204,188	97.35			
Invalid/blank votes	5,560	2.65	▼1.3		
Total votes	209,748	100.00	–		
Registered voters/turnout	226,098	92.77	▲1.9		

Results by electorate
	Brindabella			Ginninderra			Molonglo		
Party	Votes	%	Seats	Votes	%	Seats	Votes	%	Seats
Labor	27,337	45.7	3	29,782	50.1	3	38,516	45.3	3
Liberal	24,130	40.4	2	19,269	32.4	2	27,684	32.6	3
Greens	4,336	7.3	0	4,885	8.2	0	9,776	11.5	1
Democrats	924	1.5	0	2,443	4.1	0	1,228	1.4	0
Independent	782	1.3	0	282	0.5	0	2,709	3.2	0
Liberal Democrats	442	0.7	0	723	1.2	0	1,501	1.8	0
Helen Cross Independents	—	—	—	—	—	—	2,608	3.1	0
Free Range Canberra	348	0.6	0	451	0.8	0	630	0.7	0
Harold Hird Independents	—	—	—	1,371	2.3	0	—	—	—
Christian Democrats	1,370	2.3	0	—	—	—	—	—	—
ACT Equality Party	100	0.2	0	197	0.3	0	365	0.4	0

Distribution of seats
Electorate	Seats held
Brindabella	
Ginninderra	
Molonglo	

On election night 16 October 2004, four hours after the close of polling, with 78 per cent of the vote counted, Liberal leader, Brendan Smyth, conceded defeat to Labor. Smyth conceded that the incumbent Labor Government had been returned for a second term and appeared set to win the Territory's first ever majority mandate. Labor had obtained 47 per cent of the vote across the ACT, with the Liberals at 34.8 per cent and the Greens at 9.2 per cent. Swings were recorded towards Labor (+5.3 per cent), Liberal (+3.2 per cent) and the ACT Greens (+0.1 per cent). Support for the Democrats collapsed and they lost their one and only seat. Counting continued up until 27 October 2004, when all preferences were distributed, resulting in Labor winning nine seats, the Liberals winning seven seats, while the Greens won one seat. The ACT Electoral Commission determined and announced the election's final results on 29 October 2004. The result marked the first time in the history of ACT self-government that one party was able to win a majority in its own right.

In Brindabella, Labor retained its three seats and the Liberals retained its two seats. Government minister John Hargreaves and backbencher Karin MacDonald were re-elected; with Mick Gentleman replacing the retired former Government minister Bill Wood. For the Liberal Party, leader Brendan Smyth and shadow minister Steve Pratt were both re-elected.

Labor gained a seat in Ginninderra, where Democrats sitting member Roslyn Dundas unsuccessfully sought re-election. The Liberals retained their two seats. Chief Minister Jon Stanhope and Labor Speaker Wayne Berry were both re-elected, with Mary Porter winning the additional seat for Labor. Both Bill Stefaniak and Vicki Dunne retained their seats for the Liberal Party.

In seven-member Molonglo, there was no change to representation from the 2001 ACT election with both Labor and the Liberals retaining three seats, and the Greens retaining one seat. Labor Deputy Chief Minister Ted Quinlan, and ministers Katy Gallagher and Simon Corbell all won re-election. The Liberal benches saw the re-election of one member, Jacqui Burke and two new members, Zed Seselja and Richard Mulcahy; following the retirement of long-serving member and former Speaker, Greg Cornwell. Helen Cross, elected as a Liberal member at the 2001 ACT election, resigned from the Liberal Party in September 2002 to become an independent. Cross failed to get re-elected at the 2004 ACT election. The Greens sitting member, Kerrie Tucker, resigned from the Assembly less than one month before the election. The Greens endorsed Deb Foskey, who was elected as the sole Green in the Assembly.

=== Electronic voting and counting system ===
==== Overview ====
The ACT's electronic voting system was first used at the 2001 election and was again used at the 2004 election. The system used standard personal computers as voting terminals, with voters using a barcode to authenticate their votes. Voting terminals were linked to a server in each polling location using a secure local area network. No votes were taken or transmitted over a public network like the Internet. The electronic voting system was used in the pre-poll voting centres, which were open for three weeks before polling day, and which opened on election day as ordinary polling places. In polling places that did not have electronic voting, voters used traditional paper ballots. In electronic polling places, voters were given a choice of voting electronically or on paper.

Electronic counting, which combines the counting of electronic votes and paper ballots, was first used in the ACT at the 2001 election and was again used in the 2004 election. In 2001 and 2004, preferences shown on paper ballots were data-entered by two independent operators, electronically checked for errors, and manually corrected if required. This data was then combined with the results of the electronic voting, and the computer program distributed preferences under the ACT's Hare-Clark electoral system. The software for the electronic voting and counting system was built using Linux open source software, which was chosen specifically for the electoral system to ensure that election software is open and transparent and could be made available to scrutineers, candidates and other participants in the electoral process.

==== 2004 statistics ====
In 2004, a total of 28,169 electronic votes were recorded at four pre-poll voting centres and at eight polling places on polling day. This number of electronic votes represented a 70 per cent increase on the 16,559 electronic votes cast at the 2001 election. The proportion of electronic votes in relation to all votes counted increased from 8.3 per cent in 2001 to 13.4 per cent in 2004. At each electronic polling place the number of voting machines was increased from ten in 2001 to at least fifteen in 2004 to ensure that those that wished to use computers to vote could do so with minimal queues. The ACT Electoral Commission claims that interim results for 20,722 votes using the electronic voting system were available through the Commission's website by ten minutes after the close of polls on polling night. Later in the night, a further 7,447 electronic votes cast were made available. Before 10:00pm, interim preference results from all formal electronic votes cast were available, representing 13.6 per cent of all formal votes. Based on these, and other results, the Commission claims that commentators were able to accurately predict the election outcome. Of the seventeen candidates indicated as elected on election night using the 27,849 formal electronic votes, sixteen were ultimately elected. Only one candidate indicated as elected on election night was not ultimately successful – Labor candidate Andrew Barr was the last candidate indicated as elected in Molonglo on election night. After the full distribution of all preferences, the last position in Molonglo was taken by Liberal candidate Zed Seselja.

== See also ==
- Members of the Australian Capital Territory Legislative Assembly, 2004-2008
- Second Stanhope Ministry
- List of Australian Capital Territory elections
