= Damian McInally =

Australian rugby player

- Born: Damian McInally; 23 December 1975 (age 50) Brisbane, Queensland
- Height: 1.87 m (6 ft 2 in)
- Weight: 90 kg (200 lb)
- School: St. Laurence's College, South Brisbane

Rugby union career
- Position: Full back
- Current team: Kubota Spears
Amateur team(s)
Years	Team	Apps	(Points)
- Brisbane Souths
–	Canberra Vikings		
- Correct as of 3 August 2007
Super Rugby
Years	Team	Apps	(Points)
1997–99	Reds	8	(15)
2000–03	Brumbies	23	(40)
- Correct as of 3 August 2007
National sevens team
Years	Team		Comps
1996,1997	Australia 7s		
- Correct as of 3 August 2007

Damian McInally (born 23 December 1975 in Brisbane, Australia) is a Rugby Union player who has represented Australia in the annual under 21 southern cross championships and Australian Rugby Sevens. He has played for the Queensland Reds and ACT Brumbies in the Southern Hemisphere Super 12 competition (now Super Rugby).

While contracted to the ACT Brumbies, McInally captained the Canberra Vikings, leading them to three consecutive Queensland Premier Rugby championships in 2001, 2002, and 2003. McInally played for Japan's Top League side the Kubota Spears from 2004 to 2009. He was refused permission to represent Japan in the 2007 Rugby World Cup competition in France.

McInally made his debut for the ACT Veterans Rugby Club on 2 May 2015. Stephen Larkham brought McInally to the match. The pair played alongside each other in the fastest ACT Veterans backline ever.
