= ACT Veterans Rugby Club =

ACT Vets
- Union: Australian Rugby Union
- Founded: 1995
- Location: Canberra, Australian Capital Territory
- Region: Australian Capital Territory and southern New South Wales
- Ground(s): Portsea Oval at RMC Duntroon
- President: Andrew Henderson
- Coach(es): Gareth James, Andrew Henderson

Official website
- www.actvetsrugby.org.au

The ACT Vets are a rugby union team based in Canberra, Australian Capital Territory (ACT), whose players must be 35 years of age or older. Portsea Oval, at the Royal Military College, Duntroon is the club's home ground.

The Patron in Chief of the club is General David Hurley. Other Honorary Patrons are General Sir Peter Cosgrove, Air Chief Marshal Sir Angus Houston, Vice Admiral Ray Griggs and Lieutenant General John Frewen.

== History ==
John Hillier was captain/coach of the Canberra Royals 5th Grade team in 1994 and, at the age of 34, was getting tired of running with much younger players and decided to establish a club for older players who still wanted to play rugby but did not want to be involved in grade competitions. The Evergreens, a Canberra Golden Oldies team, was only formed every three to four years to play in international Golden Oldies tournaments. Hillier felt there was a need to have a regular schedule of games to keep players involved in the sport in their post grade-competition years. With the assistance of Wests Lions and the Queanbeyan Whites, Hillier developed plans for a regular game schedule for a new veterans’ rugby team.

The ACT Veterans Rugby team played its first game at O’Connor Oval in March 1995. More than thirty players turned up for the first game together with many officers from the Royal Military College, Duntroon (RMC). It was the start of a new co-operative relationship with the RMC that has remained ever since. Given the large numbers for the first game, it was decided to form three teams playing each other over three 20-minute periods. The tradition of the three ‘halves’ has continued on. The early games also established other rules of Veterans Rugby, like no pushing in scrums but contested line-outs, rucks and mauls. This schedule of games at O’Connor Oval with RMC continued through the 1995 and 1996 seasons and in 1997, at the invitation of RMC, the ACT Veterans moved to Portsea Oval which has been the club's home ground ever since. Hillier was president of the club for 21 years.

Journalist, Chris Dutton, described the club as "the most powerful rugby club in Australia" in his 27 March 2014 article in the Canberra Times. "World Cup winners, rugby league legends, politicians and Defence Force chiefs – meet the most powerful rugby team in Australia: the ACT Veterans", he wrote. </

== Colours and Logo ==
The ACT Veterans Rugby Club competition jersey colours are Royal Blue, White, Gold, Sky Blue, Maroon, Red, Black and Myrtle Green. These are the colours of the eight senior rugby clubs that existed when the Vets were formed in 1995. Navy blue, white and gold, the Brumbies traditional colours, were chosen for the shorts. The Vets logo is also an adaption of the Brumbies logo and shows their close affiliation with the Brumbies, Canberra and southern NSW region's Super Rugby team. Brumbies wild horses inhabit Canberra's hinterland.

=== Kit sponsors and manufacturers ===
Period	Kit manufacturer	Major Sponsor	Player of the Day Jacket Sponsor	Shorts Sponsor
2014	Tsunami and BLK	Paladin Risk Management	McAfee	DHL Express
2015	Tsunami and Canterbury	Paladin Risk Management	GENLEC	DHL Express
2016	Game Changer	Paladin Risk Management	GENLEC	DHL Express
2017	Vacant	Paladin Risk Management	GENLEC	DHL Express
2018	Tsunami	Paladin Risk Management	GENLEC	DHL Express Michael Thompson Photography
2019	Canterbury of New Zealand	Paladin Risk Management	Vacant	Canterbury
2020-2025	Canterbury of New Zealand	Paladin Risk Management	Elysium EPL	Canterbury

== Charities ==
The club plays most games, including a curtain-raiser for the Brumbies every year, to generate sponsorship and donate to their charities. They have raised well over $650,000 for charities including Legacy Australia, Soldier On, the George Gregan Foundation, Menslink, Clare Holland House, the Heart Foundation, the Pediatrics Unit of the Canberra Hospital and Snowy Hydro SouthCare with the help of their sponsors.

== Notable players ==
- Stephen Larkham played with the ACT Veterans at the World Vintage Rugby Carnival in Hawaii in September 2012. During this carnival he also played as a reserve for an old boys team from Brazil who, not realising who he was, asked him to play second row because he was tall. Despite his commitments with the Brumbies and Wallabies, Larkham occasionally still plays with the ACT Vets. Larkham received the GENLEC Player of the Day jacket for his play and sportsmanship in the Clare Holland Cup charity match on 18 February 2018.
- Ben Alexander (rugby union) played for the ACT Veterans against HMAS Canberra in November 2020.
- Bill Stefaniak is one of the two original players still playing with the ACT Vets. Stefaniak also represented the Australian Parliament XV during 2015 Parliamentary Rugby World Cup in England.
- General David Hurley has played both for and against the ACT Veterans in a number of games, helping the Army Old Boys and RMC in charity matches. He is also an honorary patron of the club.
- Mal Meninga started playing for the ACT Veterans following the 1997 Australian Masters Games in Canberra. When playing against the Western Samoa Golden Oldies team, Meninga started on the bench for the first time in his life and jokingly commented that this was a new experience for him.
- Andrew Walker (rugby) played for the ACT Veterans during the 2010 Pan Pacific Masters Games.
- Damian McInally made his debut for the ACT Veterans on 2 May 2015. Stephen Larkham brought McInally to the match. The pair played alongside each other in the fastest ACT Veterans backline ever.
- Jayson Hinder played for the ACT Veterans since 2006. Hinder was also a member of the winning Australian Parliament XV squad in the 2015 Parliamentary Rugby World Cup in England. Hinder was killed on 30 April 2017 in a motorcycle accident.
- Ian Wells, a stalwart of the Canberra Easts rugby club for many years and former military pilot, started playing for the ACT Vets in the club's early days in his mid sixties. Due to his age, he wore gold coloured shorts. Gold shorts are for players over the age of seventy and may not be tackled or touched by any player. This made him the club's highest try scorer, having scored at least one try in every match he has played for the ACT Vets. Wells has also been ‘Man of the Match’ for every Brumbies curtain raiser he has played and was a crowd favourite out at Canberra Stadium. Wells was interviewed by WIN Canberra Television News on 14 February 2016, just prior to playing a game to raise funds for a charity. He told the interviewer that he will keep on playing as long as he can. He died two weeks later at the age of 81. The annual Heart Foundation charity match is played in honour of Ian Wells.
