= Deepak-Raj Gupta =

Australian politician

Deepak-Raj Gupta, OAM
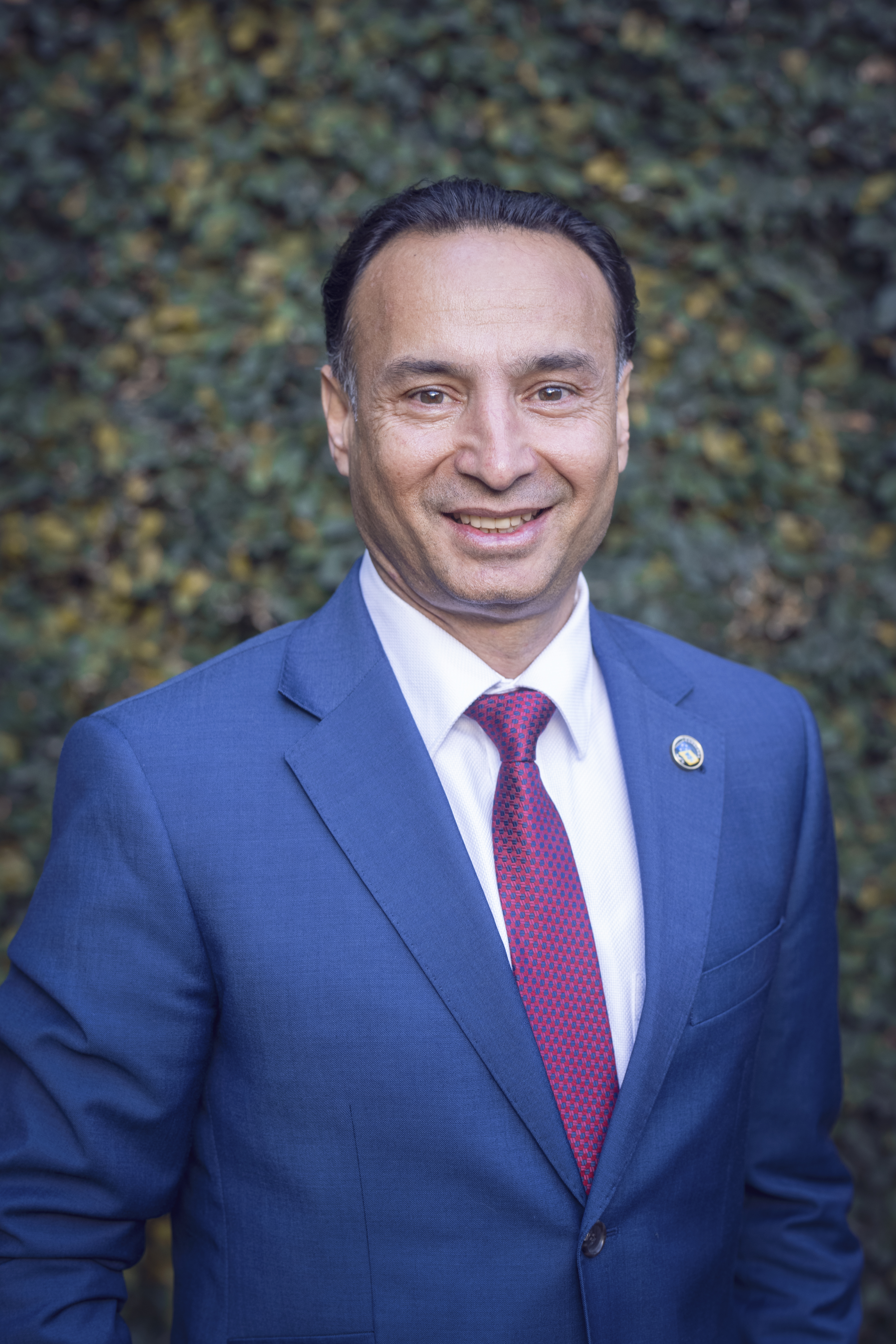

Member of the Australian Capital Territory Legislative Assembly for Yerrabi
- In office 23 July 2019 – 17 October 2020
- Preceded by: Meegan Fitzharris

Personal details
- Born: 1966 (age 59–60) Agra, India
- Citizenship: Australian
- Party: Australian Labor Party
- Education: Punjab University, Chandigarh
- Profession: Politician, community leader
- Awards: Order of Australia

Deepak-Raj Gupta is an Indian-born Australian politician and community leader. He was a Labor member for Yerrabi in the Australian Capital Territory Legislative Assembly from July 2019 to October 2020.

== Biography ==
Gupta was born in the city of Agra in Uttar Pradesh, India, and raised in Chandigarh. He completed his Bachelor of Arts at Punjab University in Chandigarh. In 1989 he emigrated to Australia to complete an information technology diploma at the Holmesglen Institute in Melbourne. Gupta moved to Canberra in 2001. In Canberra, Gupta worked for a private insurance company and briefly became a project manager at the Department of Defence. In 2015, Gupta was involved in an ACT Government delegation to India to promote trade and business between India and Australia. Gupta currently lives in Gungahlin with his wife and two children.

== Community engagement ==
Gupta was the president of the Australia India Business Council (AIBC) ACT Chapter for 10 years and is now a member of the AIBC National Executive Board of Directors. He has helped organise several popular multicultural programs in the annual National Multicultural Festival as well as starting events such as the 'India in the City' program and the World Curry Festival.

In 2012, Gupta was awarded the ACT Community Advocate award. In 2015, he was awarded the Community Service Excellence Award in Sydney, NSW. The award was in recognition of Gupta's work in promoting multicultural harmony, acceptance, mutual respect and understanding among the ACT's diverse communities.

== Political career ==
Under the Labor Party in 2016, Gupta was the first person of Indian origin to run in an ACT election. Gupta was sworn in during July 2019, he became the first Indian-born person to hold the position of MLA in the Australian Capital Territory. He was also the first MLA to be sworn in on the Bhagwat Gita, representing his Hindu faith.

Gupta's maiden speech focused on education, health, supporting small business and multiculturalism. During his time in the Assembly, Gupta has pushed forward support for increased water efficiency, providing cost of living support through a strong climate strategy and recognition of Canberra's designer Walter Burley Griffin. In 2019, Gupta joined Chief Minister Andrew Barr on a delegation to India, to discuss education and tourism, and to promote trade relationships between the ACT, New Delhi and Mumbai. Gupta was unsuccessful at the 2020 ACT election.

== Award and recognition ==
On 26 January 2022, Gupta has been awarded a Medal of the Order of Australia in recognition of his service to Canberra.
