= Like Canberra =

- Convenor: Tim Bohm
- Founded: 2016
- Dissolved: 2018

Website
- http://www.likecanberra.com/

Like Canberra was a political party registered for the 2016 Australian Capital Territory election. It was formally registered on 28 June 2016. It fielded two candidates in each of the five electorates.

The party's views included support for a bullet train between Canberra and Sydney, an Independent Commission Against Corruption, waiving one parking fine per year, increased wages for nurses, childcare workers and teachers, and marriage equality. They initially opposed the Canberra's light rail project, labelling it a "trojan horse" for developers along Northbourne Avenue; they now state "it is going to happen", and support an investigation of the process and scrutiny of the ongoing rollout.

The Like Canberra party had overlapping membership and goals with the federally-registered Bullet Train for Australia party, which had grown from a party named Bullet Train for Canberra in the 2012 ACT election, the Canberra party having been deregistered on 13 August 2013. Both Bullet Train for Australia and Like Canberra were headed by Tim Bohm; however, they are not officially related. The relationship between the parties is disputed, with three disgruntled Bullet Train for Australia members raising concerns about the party's endorsement of Like Canberra, party expenditure on the Like Canberra campaign, and a lack of consultation around the intersection between the parties.

The Like Canberra party was deregistered in 2018.
