= Tara Cheyne =

Australian politician (born 1986)

Tara Cheyne MLA
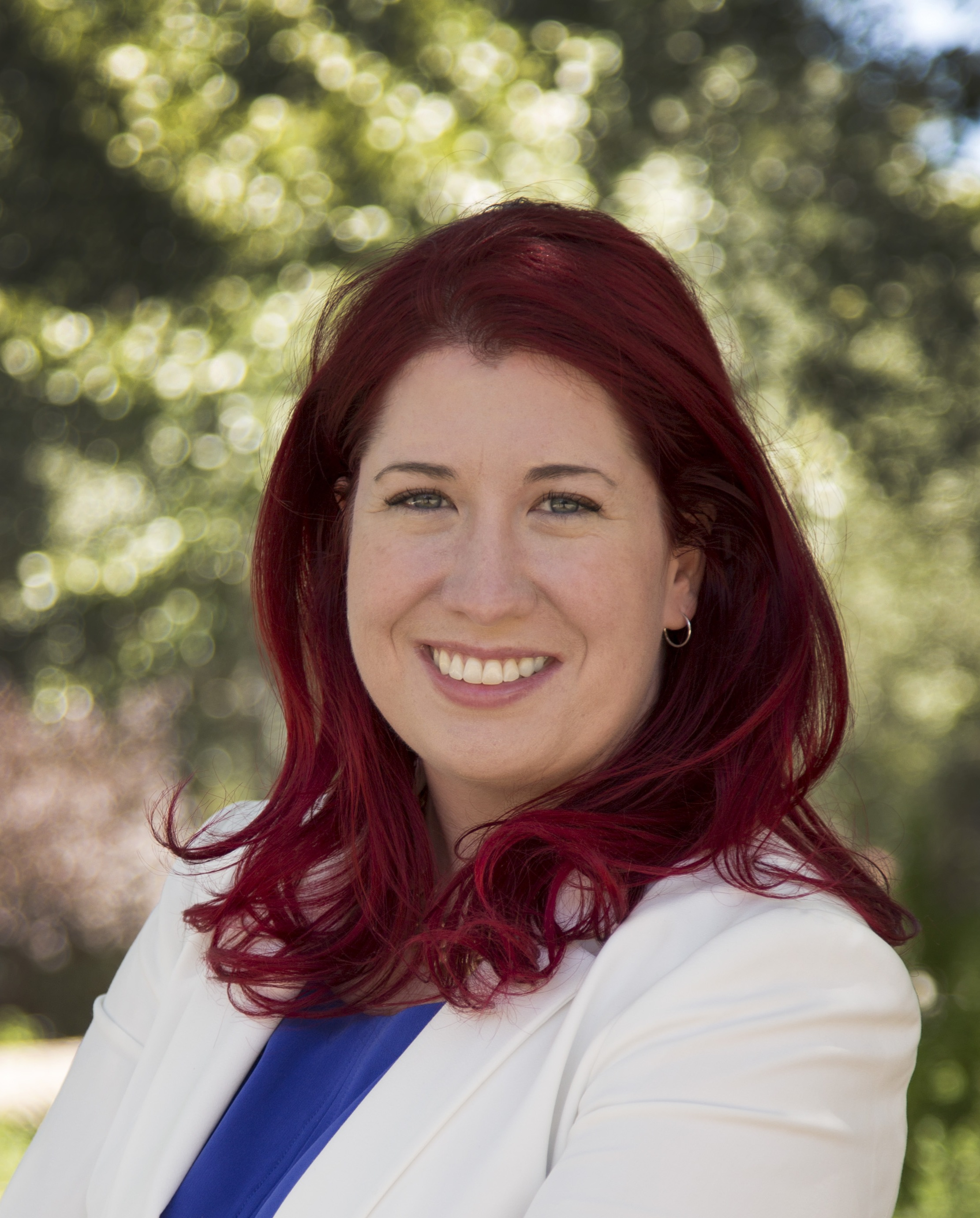

Attorney-General of the Australian Capital Territory
- Incumbent
- Assumed office 7 November 2024
- Preceded by: Shane Rattenbury

Member of the Australian Capital Territory Legislative Assembly for Ginninderra
- Incumbent
- Assumed office 26 October 2016

Personal details
- Born: Tara Maree Cheyne; 30 December 1986 (age 39) Cairns, Queensland
- Party: Labor Party
- Education: University of Queensland; University of Canberra
- Occupation: Politician
- Website: www.taracheyne.com.au

Tara Maree Cheyne (/ˈtʃeɪn/ CHAYN, born 30 December 1986) is an Australian politician, serving as a Member for the Ginninderra electorate in the Australian Capital Territory Legislative Assembly as of 26 October 2016.

== Life, education and career prior to entering politics ==
Tara Cheyne was born in the northern Queensland city of Cairns and throughout her youth lived with her parents in a number of rural Queensland mining towns. She attended Rockhampton Grammar School as a boarder and completed high school studies in 2003, being awarded Academic Dux. She studied at the University of Queensland completing a dual program of Bachelor of Arts and Bachelor of Journalism. She moved to Canberra in 2008 and began her public service career in the Attorney-General's Department, rising to senior positions.

Cheyne completed a Master of Business Administration from the University of Canberra in September 2013.

In 2016, she began a position in the Department of Finance which she held until her election to the Legislative Assembly in October 2016.

Cheyne married her long-term partner, James McMenamin, in Grand Teton National Park in August, 2025.

== Community profile ==
Cheyne began a popular blog, In The Taratory in 2011. The name is a portmanteau of the words Tara and Territory (for ACT). The blog focused on reviewing and promoting activities and services from the Canberra region. It was originally co-written by Cheyne and another person called Tara, but was solely authored by Cheyne from August 2012.

She held the position of President of the Belconnen Community Council 2014–15, sat on the board of the Belconnen Arts Centre, and was a founding member of the Canberra Global Shapers Hub.

== Political career ==
In November 2015, Cheyne was preselected by the ACT Branch of the Labor Party as a candidate in Ginninderra for the 2016 ACT election. Cheyne was declared elected on 22 October 2016.

Her inaugural speech in the ACT Legislative Assembly was given on 13 December 2016.

In the Ministry effective 17 February 2021, Cheyne was:

- Assistant Minister for Economic Development
- Minister for the Arts
- Minister for Business and Better Regulation
- Minister for Human Rights
- Minister for Multicultural Affairs

As of the 2024 Fourth Barr ministry, Cheyne is the Manager of Government Business, the Attorney-General, the Minister for Human Rights, the Minister for City and Government Services and the Minister for the Night-Time Economy.
