= Mary Porter (politician) =

Australian politician

Mary Porter AM

Deputy Speaker of the Australian Capital Territory Legislative Assembly
- In office 5 November 2008 – 19 February 2016

Member of the Australian Capital Territory Legislative Assembly for Ginninderra
- In office 16 October 2004 – 19 February 2016
- Succeeded by: Jayson Hinder

Personal details
- Born: Mary Edith Pannell; 8 August 1942 (age 83) Caterham, Surrey, England, United Kingdom
- Citizenship: Australian
- Party: Labor Party
- Spouse(s): James Porter Ian De Landelles (m. 1992)
- Occupation: Nurse and midwife
- Website: maryporter.net

Mary Edith Porter AM (née Pannell; born 8 August 1942) is a former Labor member of the ACT Assembly. She was first elected to the Assembly in October 2004. Immediately prior to that, she was CEO of Volunteering ACT from 1993 until October 2004

Born in Caterham, England of a Scottish background, Mary arrived in Australia when she was 12. In 1963 Mary graduated as a nurse from Wollongong Hospital and went on to work in New South Wales, Queensland and in the Aboriginal Community of Oenpelli (present-day Gunbalanya).

In 1967 she again graduated from Wollongong Hospital, this time as a midwife. Mary returned to the Northern Territory and used her midwifery skills in many remote and isolated Aboriginal community's before accepting the role of sister in charge of the Dhupuma Residential College for Aboriginal students in Gove. In 1979 Mary moved to Canberra working with a group of other women to establish Tuggeranong Community Service, now known as Communities at Work, becoming a community worker when the organisation received funding. Mary also worked for the Federal Member for Canberra, Ros Kelly.

Mary was also instrumental in helping to establish what is now Volunteering ACT and Volunteering Australia, becoming president of both organisations.

She was awarded a Member of the Order of Australia in 2003 for her services to remote indigenous communities and the broader community, having received the Centenary Medal in 2001.

Mary was elected in October 2004 to represent the electorate of Ginninderra in the Australian Capital Territory Legislative Assembly. Her winning of the third seat in Ginninderra resulted in the ALP achieving majority government, the only time this has been achieved by a political party. After the 2008 election the Labor minority government needed the support of the Greens, who had won a record result of 4 parliamentary seats. As part of the negotiations Green MP Shane Rattenbury was elected Speaker of the ACT Legislative Assembly, the first time the Speaker did not come from the governing party. Representing her party, Porter was elected Deputy Speaker under Rattenbury.

As a member of the Legislative Assembly, she prepared and introduced legislation to provide a statutory framework for retirement villages in the ACT. Her efforts were strongly supported by the ACT Retirement Village Residents Association under the presidency of Pam Graudenz and eventually saw the unanimous passage of legislation on 22 August 2012. The legislation came into effect on 4 March 2013.

In Mary's last election campaign of 2012, despite being a back-bencher, she polled more primary votes than any ALP candidate other than the Chief Minister. After Labor formed a coalition government with the Greens following the election, the party nominated Porter for the office of Speaker this time. However, as expected, she was not elected, as the sole Greens MP Rattenbury had announced to vote for the Liberal Party's candidate Vicki Dunne with the aim of harmonising the relationship of the rivaling parties. Porter was reelected Deputy Speaker afterwards.

In her last term in the Assembly, Mary undertook a study tour of countries in Europe where assisted dying is legal. On her return, she prepared an extensive report which became the basis of an extensive community consultation process encouraging members of the public to have their say about the issue.

In October 2015, she announced her intention to retire at the next ACT election due to illness, however in January 2016, she brought her retirement forward due to medical advice and resigned from the Legislative Assembly on 19 February.

Following her retirement, Mary moved to Murrays Beach on the eastern shore of Lake Macquarie. She remains active in the community and is chair of NED, a not for profit organisation that supports community development projects. She is currently working in a voluntary capacity with the law faculty of the University of Newcastle to make Newcastle a restorative city.
