= Jayson Hinder =

Australian politician (1965–2017)

Member of the Australian Capital Territory Legislative Assembly for Ginninderra
- In office 3 March 2016 – 22 October 2016
- Preceded by: Mary Porter

Personal details
- Born: Jayson Richard Hinder; 4 September 1965 Canberra, Australia
- Died: 30 April 2017 (aged 51) California, United States
- Party: Labor Party
- Education: Australian National University
- Occupation: Lawyer

Jayson Richard Hinder (4 September 1965 – 30 April 2017) was an Australian lawyer and politician. He was elected as a Labor Party member of the Australian Capital Territory Legislative Assembly for Ginninderra electorate, in a countback conducted on 3 March 2016 to fill a casual vacancy caused by the resignation of Mary Porter. He was defeated at the general election in October. Hinder was killed in a motorcycle accident in California in April 2017.

== Early life ==
Hinder was born and raised in Canberra, the son of a draughtsman and an art teacher. When his father died of emphysema at the age of 43, Hinder was sent to boarding school in the Southern Highlands while his mother sold the family home and moved into Canberra Girls Grammar School as the school's boarding manager.

== Legal career ==
After leaving school, Hinder worked as a motor mechanic and owned his own business. At the age of 30, he decided to become a lawyer, selling his business and studying law at Australian National University. He was a partner in two Canberra law firms before starting his own practice, Jayson Hinder & Associates, in 2004.

== Sport ==
Hinder was a member of the ACT Veterans Rugby Club. He received a "Player of the Day Jacket" in 2015 and was also a member of the winning Australian Parliament XV squad in the 2015 Parliamentary Rugby World Cup in England.

== Death ==
Hinder died as a result of a motorcycle accident, April 30, 2017, near Ludlow, California, USA. According to reports,

Jayson Hinder was killed in a single-motorcycle accident after colliding with a pole on the National Trails Highway on Route 66, near Ludlow, north-east of Los Angeles, California, on Sunday afternoon local time...According to officials, Hinder lost control of his Yamaha motorcycle after failing to negotiate a left-hand curve...The Highway Patrol incident logs indicate that the 51-year-old collided with a pole.

Hinder left a wife and three adult children.
