= Canberra Community Voters =

Political party in Australia

Canberra Community Voters is a political party in the Australian Capital Territory formed by former lobbyist Richard Farmer. In an interview with the RiotACT, Farmer stated that "The clubs have given me the money, you can write that... I’ve not admitted that before, the clubs are financing the campaign, they’re paying for most of the television we’re showing." Having received $7500 from ClubsACT (as of 7 October 2016), the party opposes the government's decision to break the clubs' monopoly on poker machines by allowing Casino Canberra to have them as well.
