= Meegan Fitzharris =

Australian politician

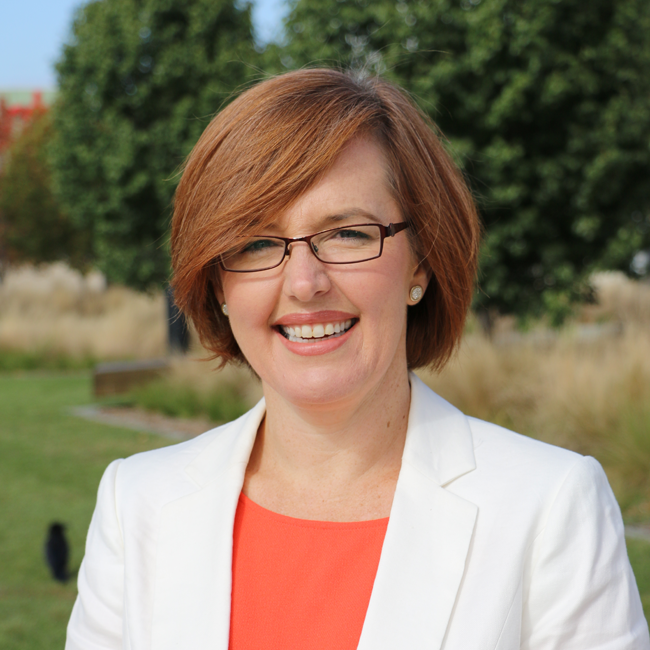
- Meegan Fitzharris in Gungahlin in 2015

Minister for Tertiary Education
- In office 22 January 2016 – 1 July 2019
- Leader: Andrew Barr
- Succeeded by: Andrew Barr

Minister for Transport
- In office 22 January 2016 – 1 July 2019
- Leader: Andrew Barr
- Preceded by: Shane Rattenbury
- Succeeded by: Chris Steel

Minister for Health and Wellbeing
- In office 22 January 2016 – 1 July 2019
- Leader: Andrew Barr
- Preceded by: Simon Corbell
- Succeeded by: Rachel Stephen-Smith

Member of the ACT Legislative Assembly for Yerrabi
- In office 15 October 2016 – 8 July 2019
- Succeeded by: Deepak-Raj Gupta

Member of the ACT Legislative Assembly for Molonglo
- In office 16 January 2015 – 15 October 2016
- Preceded by: Katy Gallagher

Personal details
- Born: 1972 (age 53–54) Wellington, New Zealand
- Citizenship: Australian
- Party: Labor Party
- Spouse: Pierre Huetter
- Children: Three
- Education: University of Otago; University of Auckland
- Occupation: Politician, political staffer, public servant
- Website: www.meeganfitzharris.com

Meegan Fitzharris (born 1972) is an Australian former politician, who was a member of the Australian Capital Territory Legislative Assembly for the Yerrabi electorate from October 2016 to July 2019, and before that, member for the electorate of Molonglo after she won a countback to fill the Legislative Assembly seat vacated by former Chief Minister, Katy Gallagher, in January 2015. She was the Minister for Transport and Municipal Services, Minister for Higher Education, Training and Research and Minister for Health until her resignation from politics in July 2019.

== Life and career ==
Meegan Fitzharris was born in Wellington, New Zealand, in 1972. She was educated at the University of Otago and the University of Auckland, and holds a Bachelor of Commerce and a Masters in International Development.

Fitzharris moved to Australia in 1998. She has three children. She has New Zealand citizenship.

Before commencing a political career, Fitzharris worked for New South Wales Police, Australian Federal Police and the Attorney-General's Department.

=== Politics ===
Fitzharris was a Labor Party candidate in the 2012 Australian Capital Territory election. When she did not win a seat, she became the chief of staff and senior adviser for then Minister, later Chief Minister, Andrew Barr.

Chief Minister Katy Gallagher resigned from the Assembly on 23 December 2014 to pursue a seat in the Australian Senate. Ahead of Gallagher's resignation, media speculation was that Fitzharris would be the most likely candidate to take Gallagher's Assembly seat.

On 15 January 2015, ACT Electoral Commissioner Phil Green announced Fitzharris had been elected as the new member for Molonglo in the Legislative Assembly, after holding a countback of the 2012 Legislative Assembly election.

In January 2016, Fitzharris was appointed to the Barr ministry, taking on the transport, health and higher education portfolios and becoming one of ACT Labor's most senior frontbenchers. As transport minister, she oversaw the introduction of light rail in Canberra, but also weathered complaints about the rollout of a new bus network in 2019. As health minister, she ordered an inquiry into allegations of bullying and misconduct at ACT Health.

On 27 June 2019, Fitzharris announced she would resign from her cabinet roles on 1 July and would resign from politics for family reasons shortly after that. She resigned from the Legislative Assembly on 8 July, creating a casual vacancy which was filled by a countback.

Australian Capital Territory Legislative Assembly
Preceded by Katy Gallagher	Member for Molonglo; 2015–2016	Electorate abolished
Electorate created	Member for Yerrabi; 2016–2019	Succeeded by Deepak-Raj Gupta
Political offices
Preceded by	Minister for Tertiary Education; 2016–2019	Succeeded by Andrew Barr
Preceded by Simon Corbell	Minister for Health and Wellbeing; 2016–2019	Succeeded by Rachel Stephen-Smith
Preceded by Shane Rattenbury	Minister for Transport; 2016–2019	Succeeded by Chris Steel
