= Parton shadow ministry =

Parton Shadow Ministry
- Shadow Cabinet of the Australian Capital Territory

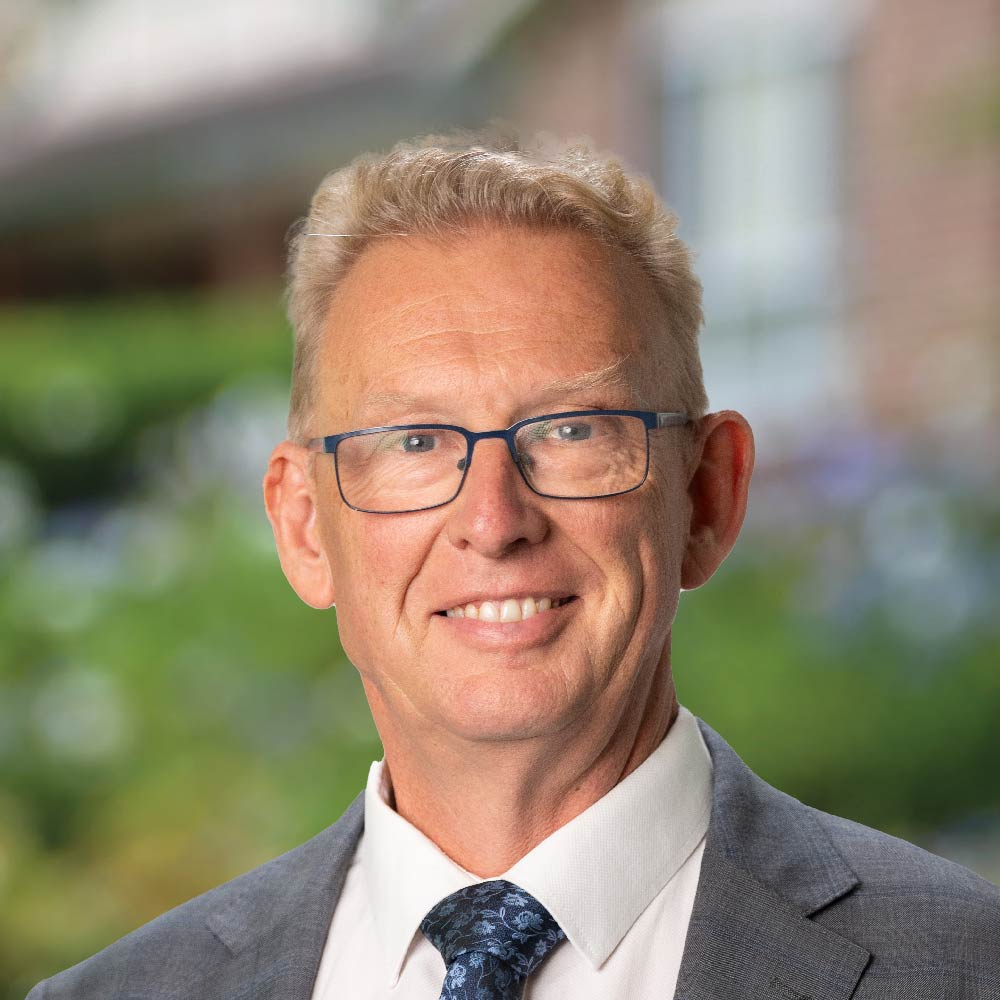
- Mark Parton
- Date formed: 4 December 2025

People and organisations
- Opposition Leader: Mark Parton
- Deputy Opposition Leader: Deborah Morris
- Total no. of members: 7
- Member party: Canberra Liberals
- Status in legislature: Opposition; 7/25

History
- Elections: 2024 (legislative); 2025 (leadership)
- Legislature term: 11th
- Predecessor: Castley shadow ministry

The Parton shadow ministry is the 20th and current shadow cabinet of the Australian Capital Territory, led by Mark Parton and his deputy Deborah Morris. It was formed following the 2025 Canberra Liberals leadership election, held on 10 November, and shadows the Fourth Barr ministry.

The cabinet is composed of all Liberal MLAs except for Jeremy Hanson who is Speaker of the Assembly.

== Background ==
Following the Canberra Liberal's seventh consecutive loss at the 2024 Australian Capital Territory election, then leader Elizabeth Lee was spilled and a leadership election was held in which Leanne Castley was elected leader and Jeremy Hanson deputy leader of the party.

On 19 June 2025, Peter Cain resigned from the Shadow Cabinet and moved to the backbench saying that he could no longer support the current leadership.

On 28 October 2025, backbenchers Peter Cain and Elizabeth Lee crossed the floor to vote with the crossbench in favour of a motion to keep the number of sitting weeks at 13 for 2026, rather than reducing it to 12 as was supported by both Labor and the Liberal party room. Following this, Castley unilaterally removed the two backbenchers from the Liberal party room despite precedent and a previously stated commitment to following this precedent that allows Liberal backbenchers to cross the floor.

On 10 November 2025 both Leanne Castley and deputy leader Jeremy Hanson announced they would resign from their leadership positions and not seek to recontest. A leadership election was held later that day and Mark Parton was elected leader unanimously. Deborah Morris was elected deputy, also unanimously.

On 2 December, Jeremy Hanson was elected to the vacant Speakership replacing Deputy Speaker Andrew Braddock who had been acting leader since Parton became Leader of the Opposition.

On 4 December, Parton announced the new composition of his shadow cabinet, returning Elizabeth Lee and Peter Cain to the ministry and having no backbenchers.

A minor reshuffle occurred on 16 April 2026 in which a Men and Men's Health portfolio was established for leader Mark Parton. Leanne Castley's portfolio of Women was restructured to Women and Women's Health and the Heath portfolio was restructured to Health and Mental Health.

On 3 June 2026, Leanne Castley left the party, and with it the shadow ministry, citing a toxic internal party culture including "bullying, intimidation, lies and a threat of physical assault".

== Current composition ==
Party	Faction	Member	Portrait	Offices
Liberal	Moderate	Mark Parton (born 1966) MLA for Brindabella (since 2016)		Leader of the Opposition; Leader of the Canberra Liberals; Shadow Minister for Health and Mental Health (since 16 April 2026); Shadow Minister for Men and Men's Health (since 16 April 2026); Shadow Minister for Transport; Shadow Minister for Gaming and Racing; Shadow Minister for Aboriginal and Torres Strait Islander Affairs
Liberal	Conservative	Deborah Morris MLA for Brindabella (since 2024)		Deputy Leader of the Opposition; Deputy Leader of the Canberra Liberals; Shadow Minister for Planning; Shadow Minister for Police, Emergency Services and Community Safety; Shadow Minister for Home Ownership and Housing Affordability; Shadow Minister for Corrections
Liberal		Ed Cocks (b. 1979) MLA for Murrumbidgee (since 2022)		Opposition Whip; Shadow Treasurer; Shadow Minister for Private Sector Employment and Industrial Relations; Shadow Minister for Youth Affairs
Liberal		Peter Cain (b. 1954) MLA for Ginninderra (since 2020)		Shadow Minister for Community Services and Disability; Shadow Minister for Government Services; Shadow Minister for Veterans; Shadow Minister for Seniors
Liberal		Chiaka Barry MLA for Ginninderra (since 2024)		Shadow Attorney-General; Shadow Minister for Social Housing and Homelessness; Shadow Minister for Multicultural Affairs
Liberal	Moderate	Elizabeth Lee (b. 1979) MLA for Kurrajong (since 2016)		Shadow Minister for Education; Shadow Minister for Environment and Climate Change; Shadow Minister for Tourism and Events
Liberal		James Milligan (b. 1979) MLA for Yerrabi (since 2021)		Shadow Minister for Business Innovation and Economic Development; Shadow Minister for Skills and Vocational Training; Shadow Minister for Sport and Recreation; Shadow Minister for Arts and Creative Industries

== Previous compositions ==
=== Composition at Castley's departure ===
Party	Faction	Member	Portrait	Offices
Liberal	Moderate	Mark Parton (born 1966) MLA for Brindabella (since 2016)		Leader of the Opposition; Leader of the Canberra Liberals; Shadow Minister for Health and Mental Health (since 16 April 2026); Shadow Minister for Men and Men's Health (since 16 April 2026); Shadow Minister for Transport; Shadow Minister for Gaming and Racing; Shadow Minister for Aboriginal and Torres Strait Islander Affairs
Liberal	Conservative	Deborah Morris MLA for Brindabella (since 2024)		Deputy Leader of the Opposition; Deputy Leader of the Canberra Liberals; Shadow Minister for Planning; Shadow Minister for Police, Emergency Services and Community Safety; Shadow Minister for Home Ownership and Housing Affordability; Shadow Minister for Corrections
Liberal		Ed Cocks (b. 1979) MLA for Murrumbidgee (since 2022)		Opposition Whip; Shadow Treasurer; Shadow Minister for Private Sector Employment and Industrial Relations; Shadow Minister for Youth Affairs
Liberal		Peter Cain (b. 1954) MLA for Ginninderra (since 2020)		Shadow Minister for Community Services and Disability; Shadow Minister for Government Services; Shadow Minister for Veterans; Shadow Minister for Seniors
Liberal		Chiaka Barry MLA for Ginninderra (since 2024)		Shadow Attorney-General; Shadow Minister for Social Housing and Homelessness; Shadow Minister for Multicultural Affairs
Liberal		Leanne Castley (b. 1974) MLA for Yerrabi (since 2020)		Shadow Minister for City Services (until 3 June 2026); Shadow Minister for Women and Women’s Health (16 April – 3 June 2026); Shadow Minister for Prevention of Family and Domestic Violence (until 3 June 2026)
Liberal	Moderate	Elizabeth Lee (b. 1979) MLA for Kurrajong (since 2016)		Shadow Minister for Education; Shadow Minister for Environment and Climate Change; Shadow Minister for Tourism and Events
Liberal		James Milligan (b. 1979) MLA for Yerrabi (since 2021)		Shadow Minister for Business Innovation and Economic Development; Shadow Minister for Skills and Vocational Training; Shadow Minister for Sport and Recreation; Shadow Minister for Arts and Creative Industries

=== Original composition ===
Party	Faction	Member	Portrait	Offices
Liberal	Moderate	Mark Parton (born 1966) MLA for Brindabella (since 2016)		Leader of the Opposition; Leader of the Canberra Liberals; Shadow Minister for Health (until 16 April 2026); Shadow Minister for Transport; Shadow Minister for Gaming and Racing; Shadow Minister for Aboriginal and Torres Strait Islander Affairs
Liberal	Conservative	Deborah Morris MLA for Brindabella (since 2024)		Deputy Leader of the Opposition; Deputy Leader of the Canberra Liberals; Shadow Minister for Planning; Shadow Minister for Police, Emergency Services and Community Safety; Shadow Minister for Home Ownership and Housing Affordability; Shadow Minister for Corrections
Liberal		Ed Cocks (b. 1979) MLA for Murrumbidgee (since 2022)		Opposition Whip; Shadow Treasurer; Shadow Minister for Private Sector Employment and Industrial Relations; Shadow Minister for Youth Affairs
Liberal		Peter Cain (b. 1954) MLA for Ginninderra (since 2020)		Shadow Minister for Community Services and Disability; Shadow Minister for Government Services; Shadow Minister for Veterans; Shadow Minister for Seniors
Liberal		Chiaka Barry MLA for Ginninderra (since 2024)		Shadow Attorney-General; Shadow Minister for Social Housing and Homelessness; Shadow Minister for Multicultural Affairs
Liberal		Leanne Castley (b. 1974) MLA for Yerrabi (since 2020)		Shadow Minister for City Services; Shadow Minister for Women (until 16 April 2026); Shadow Minister for Prevention of Family and Domestic Violence
Liberal	Moderate	Elizabeth Lee (b. 1979) MLA for Kurrajong (since 2016)		Shadow Minister for Education; Shadow Minister for Environment and Climate Change; Shadow Minister for Tourism and Events
Liberal		James Milligan (b. 1979) MLA for Yerrabi (since 2021)		Shadow Minister for Business Innovation and Economic Development; Shadow Minister for Skills and Vocational Training; Shadow Minister for Sport and Recreation; Shadow Minister for Arts and Creative Industries
