= Castley shadow ministry =

Castley Shadow Ministry
- Shadow Cabinet of the Australian Capital Territory

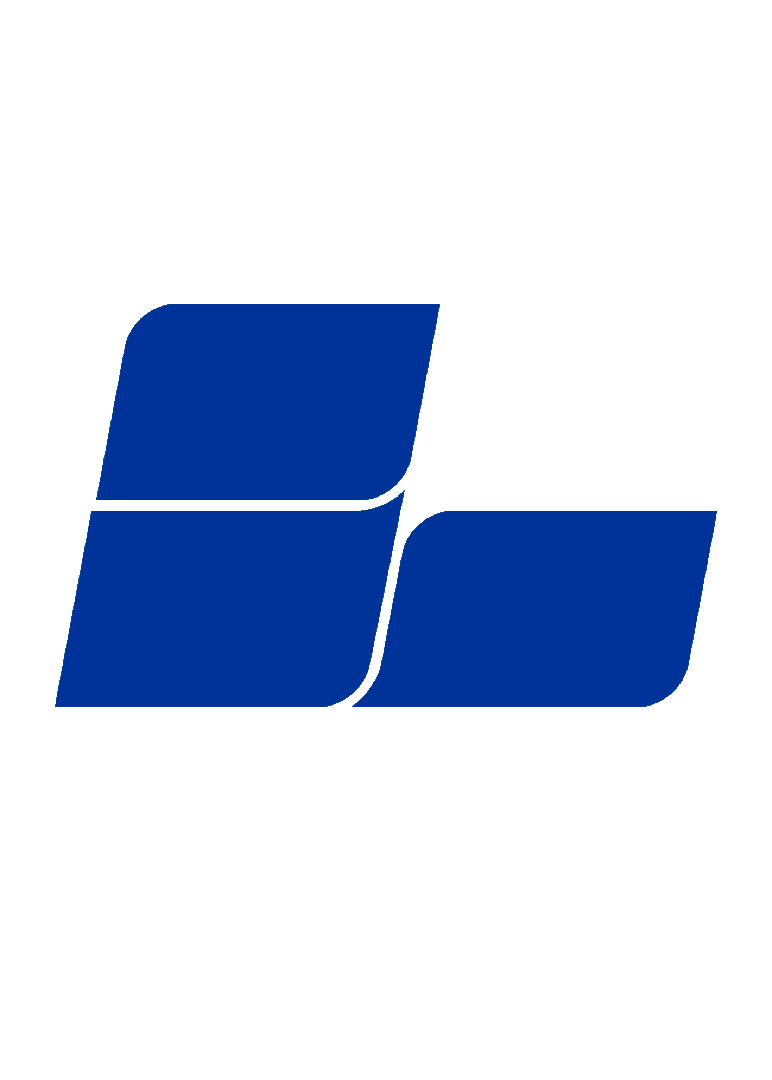
- Date formed: 18 November 2024
- Date dissolved: 4 December 2025

People and organisations
- Opposition Leader: Leanne Castley
- Deputy Opposition Leader: Jeremy Hanson
- Total no. of members: 7 (until June 2025); 6 (from June 2025)
- Member party: Canberra Liberals
- Status in legislature: Opposition; 9/25 (until October 2025) 7/25 (October 2025)

History
- Elections: 2024 (legislative); 2024 (leadership)
- Legislature term: 11th Assembly
- Predecessor: Lee shadow ministry
- Successor: Parton shadow ministry

The Castley shadow ministry was the 19th shadow ministry of the Australian Capital Territory, led by Leanne Castley and her deputy Jeremy Hanson. It was formed following the 2024 Canberra Liberals leadership election, held 31 October 2024, and was composed of most of the party's MLAs.

== History ==
=== Establishment ===
Following the Canberra Liberals' seventh consecutive loss at the 2024 Australian Capital Territory election, held 19 October, Elizabeth Lee was spilled. A leadership election was held on 31 October and was contested by Lee and her deputy Leanne Castley. Castley defeated Lee by a single vote and former leader Jeremy Hanson defeated then Speaker Mark Parton for the deputy leadership by the same margin.

Castley announced her new shadow ministry on 18 November 2024. It included seven of the Liberals' nine MLAs, excluding Speaker Mark Parton and relegating former leader Elizabeth Lee to the backbench.

=== Reshuffles ===
A cabinet reshuffle was unveiled on 24 February 2025. Peter Cain's portfolios of Planning and Environment and Housing Services were merged to become Planning and Housing Service with Environment being taken on by Castley as Agriculture and the Environment. Castley also took on the new portfolio of Seniors.

On 19 June 2025, Peter Cain resigned from the shadow ministry and moved to the backbench saying he could no longer support the leadership of the party and citing a duty of care towards his staffers.

A cabinet reshuffle was unveiled on 30 June 2025. Peter Cain's former portfolios of Attorney-General taken on by Jeremy Hanson and the portfolio of Planning and Housing Service was split with planning merged with Castley's Transport portfolio to become Planning and Transport and housing becoming Public Housing and Homelessness for Chiaka Barry.

=== Demise ===
On 28 October 2025 backbenchers Cain and Lee were suspended from the Liberal partyroom by Castley after crossing the floor to vote against a motion to reduce the number of sitting weeks from thirteen to twelve in the upcoming 2026 sitting year. This move was in violation of a longstanding precedent that Liberal backbenchers had the right to cross the floor and culminated in Castley and Hanson resigning from their leadership positions and being replaced by Mark Parton and Deborah Morris in a leadership election held on 10 November 2025.

== Composition ==
Party	Portrait	Member	Faction	Portfolios
Liberal		Leanne Castley (b. 1974) MLA for Yerrabi (since 2020)		Leader of the Opposition; Leader of the Canberra Liberals; Shadow Minister for Home Ownership; Shadow Minister for Transport (until 30 June 2025); Shadow Minister for Planning and Transport (from 30 June 2025); Shadow Minister for Health; Shadow Minister for Seniors (from 24 February 2025); Shadow Minister for Agriculture and the Environment (from 24 February 2025)
Liberal		Jeremy Hanson (born 1967) MLA for Brindabella (since 2016)	Conservative	Deputy Leader of the Opposition; Deputy Leader of the Canberra Liberals; Shadow Minister for Veterans; Shadow Minister for Education and Skills (until 30 June 2026); Shadow Minister for Education (from 30 June 2026); Shadow Special Minister of State (from 30 June 2026); Shadow Attorney-General (from 30 June 2026)
Liberal		Ed Cocks (b. 1979) MLA for Murrumbidgee (since 2022)		Opposition Whip; Shadow Treasurer; Shadow Minister for Government Services and Customer Experience
Liberal		Peter Cain (b. 1954) MLA for Ginninderra (since 2020)		Shadow Attorney-General (until 19 June 2025); Shadow Minister for Planning and Environment (until 24 February 2025); Shadow Minister for Housing Services (until 24 February 2025); Shadow Minister for Planning and Housing Services (24 February 2025 – 19 June 2025)
Liberal		Deborah Morris MLA for Brindabella (since 2024)	Conservative	Shadow Minister for Police, Emergency Services, and Community Safety; Shadow Minister for Corrections; Shadow Minister for Prevention of Family and Domestic Violence
Liberal		Chiaka Barry MLA for Ginninderra (since 2024)		Shadow Minister for Women; Shadow Minister for Aboriginal and Torres Strait Islander Affairs; Shadow Minister for Multicultural Affairs; Shadow Minister for Community Services, Disability and Carers; Shadow Minister for Public Housing and Homelessness (from 30 June 2025)
Liberal		James Milligan (b. 1979) MLA for Yerrabi (since 2021)		Shadow Minister for City Services; Shadow Minister for Sport and Recreation; Shadow Minister for Business, Arts, and Creative Industries (until 30 June 2025; Shadow Minister for Business, Arts, Creative Industries, and Skills (from 30 June 2025)
