= Members of the Australian Capital Territory Legislative Assembly, 2024–2028 =

11th Australian Capital Territory Legislative Assembly
←	10th
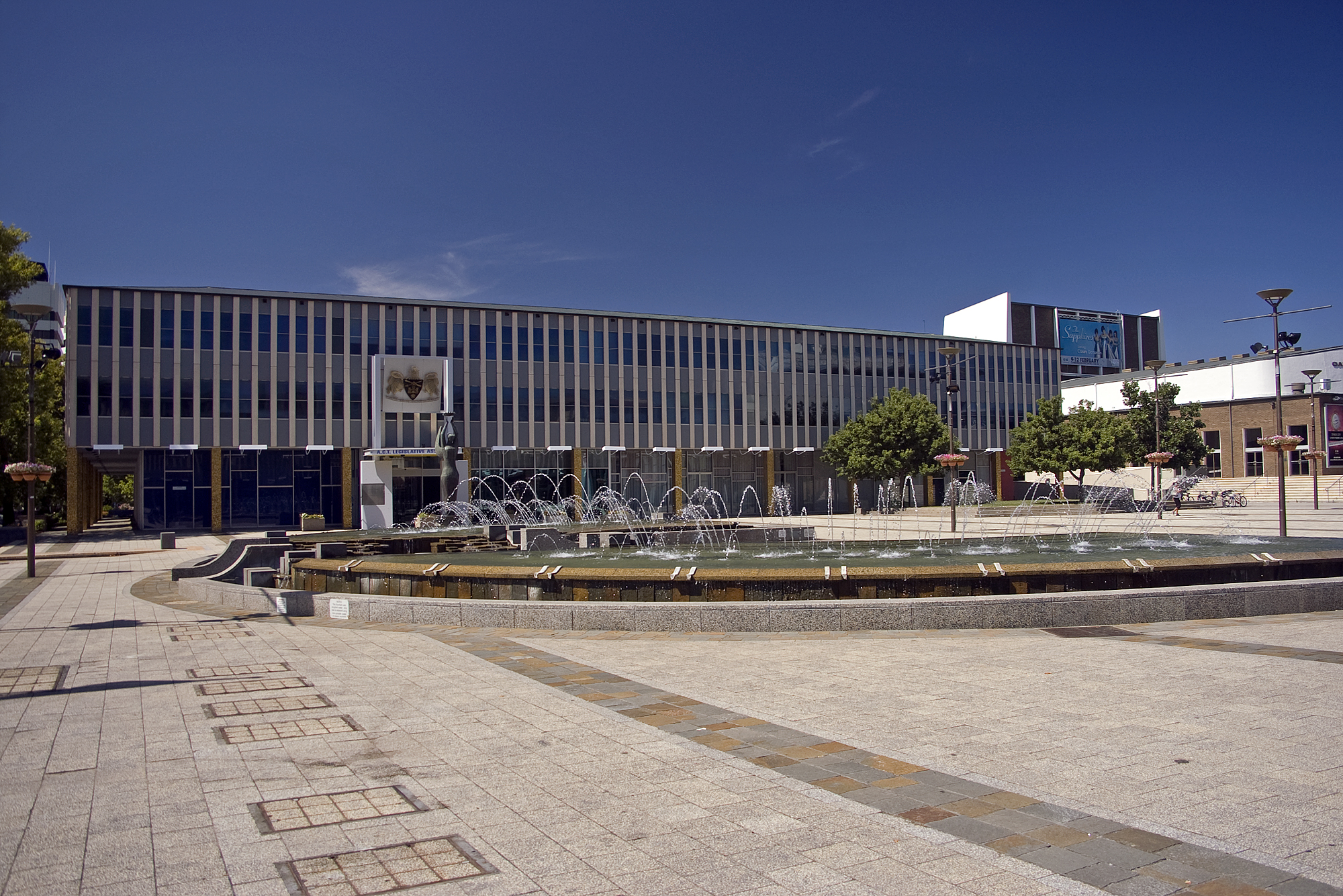

Overview
- Legislative body: Australian Capital Territory Legislative Assembly
- Jurisdiction: Australian Capital Territory, Australia
- Meeting place: Legislative Assembly Building
- Term: 19 October 2024 – 2028
- Election: October 2024
- Government: Fourth Barr ministry
- Opposition: Parton shadow ministry
- Website: www.parliament.act.gov.au/members/current

Australian Capital Territory Legislative Assembly
- Members: 25
- Speaker: Jeremy Hanson, Liberal since 2 December 2025
- Deputy Speaker: Andrew Braddock, Greens since 6 November 2024
- Chief Minister: Andrew Barr, Labor since 11 December 2014
- Leader of the Opposition: Mark Parton, Liberal since 10 November 2025
- Leader of the Greens: Jo Clay, Greens since 15 May 2026
- Party control: Government (10): Labor (10); Opposition (8): Liberal (8); Crossbench (7): Greens (4); Carrick (1); Independent (2)

Members of the Australian Capital Territory Legislative Assembly, 2024–2025

This is a list of members of the eleventh Australian Capital Territory Legislative Assembly, as elected at the October 2024 election.

== Members ==
Name	Party	Electorate	Term in office
Andrew Barr	Labor	Kurrajong	2006–present
Chiaka Barry	Liberal	Ginninderra	2024–present
Yvette Berry	Labor	Ginninderra	2012–present
Andrew Braddock	Greens	Yerrabi	2020–present
Peter Cain	Liberal	Ginninderra	2020–2025
Peter Cain	Independent Liberal	Ginninderra	2025 (Note: On 28 October 2025, Cain and Lee were suspended from the Canberra Liberals party room by then leader Leanne Castley after they crossed the floor to vote with the crossbench in favour of a motion to keep the number of sitting weeks at 13 for 2026 rather than reducing them to 12. Tensions had been simmering in the party for some time with Cain resigning from the Shadow Cabinet earlier in the year. Castley stated that she was seeking to make their suspension permanent, however she and deputy Leader Jeremy Hanson both resigned their leadership positions on 10 November, and the two suspended MLAs returned to the party room following the election of Mark Parton and Deborah Morris as leader and deputy leader respectively.)
Peter Cain	Liberal	Ginninderra	2025–present
Fiona Carrick	Fiona Carrick Independent	Murrumbidgee	2024–present
Leanne Castley	Liberal	Yerrabi	2020–2026 (Note: On 3 June 2026, Castley left the Liberal Party, citing a toxic internal party culture including "bullying, intimidation, lies, and a threat of physical assault".)
Leanne Castley	Independents	Yerrabi	2026–present
Tara Cheyne	Labor	Ginninderra	2016–present
Jo Clay	Greens	Ginninderra	2020–present
Ed Cocks	Liberal	Murrumbidgee	2022–present
Thomas Emerson	Independents for Canberra	Kurrajong	2024–2025
Thomas Emerson	Independent	Kurrajong	2025–present
Jeremy Hanson	Liberal	Murrumbidgee	2008–present
Elizabeth Lee	Liberal	Kurrajong	2016–2025
Elizabeth Lee	Independent Liberal	Kurrajong	2025
Elizabeth Lee	Liberal	Kurrajong	2025–present
James Milligan	Liberal	Yerrabi	2016–2020, 2021–present
Deborah Morris	Liberal	Brindabella	2024-present
Laura Nuttall	Greens	Brindabella	2023–present
Suzanne Orr	Labor	Yerrabi	2016–present
Mark Parton	Liberal	Brindabella	2016–present
Marisa Paterson	Labor	Murrumbidgee	2020–present
Michael Pettersson	Labor	Yerrabi	2016–present
Shane Rattenbury	Greens	Kurrajong	2008–2026 (Note: On 20 April 2026, Rattenbury announced his impending retirement. He resigned on 15 May 2026.)
Chris Steel	Labor	Murrumbidgee	2016–present
Rachel Stephen-Smith	Labor	Kurrajong	2016–present
Caitlin Tough	Labor	Brindabella	2024–present
Rebecca Vassarotti	Greens	Kurrajong	2026–present
Taimus Werner-Gibbings	Labor	Brindabella	2024–present

== See also ==
- 2024 Australian Capital Territory election
