= Opposition (Australian Capital Territory) =

The Opposition in the Australian territory of the Australian Capital Territory comprises the largest party not in Government. The Opposition's purpose is to hold the Government to account and constitute a "Government-in-waiting" should the existing Government fall. To that end, a Leader of the Opposition and Shadow Ministers for the various government departments question the Chief Minister and Ministers on Government policy and administration and formulate the policy the Opposition would pursue in Government. It is sometimes styled "His Majesty's Loyal Opposition" to demonstrate that although it opposes the Government, it remains loyal to the King.

The current Leader of the Opposition is Liberal Leader Mark Parton, and Deborah Morris is the deputy leader.

== Current Shadow Ministry ==
Party	Faction	Member	Portrait	Offices
Liberal	Moderate	Mark Parton (born 1966) MLA for Brindabella (since 2016)		Leader of the Opposition; Leader of the Canberra Liberals; Shadow Minister for Health and Mental Health (since 16 April 2026); Shadow Minister for Men and Men's Health (since 16 April 2026); Shadow Minister for Transport; Shadow Minister for Gaming and Racing; Shadow Minister for Aboriginal and Torres Strait Islander Affairs
Liberal	Conservative	Deborah Morris MLA for Brindabella (since 2024)		Deputy Leader of the Opposition; Deputy Leader of the Canberra Liberals; Shadow Minister for Planning; Shadow Minister for Police, Emergency Services and Community Safety; Shadow Minister for Home Ownership and Housing Affordability; Shadow Minister for Corrections
Liberal		Ed Cocks (b. 1979) MLA for Murrumbidgee (since 2022)		Opposition Whip; Shadow Treasurer; Shadow Minister for Private Sector Employment and Industrial Relations; Shadow Minister for Youth Affairs
Liberal		Peter Cain (b. 1954) MLA for Ginninderra (since 2020)		Shadow Minister for Community Services and Disability; Shadow Minister for Government Services; Shadow Minister for Veterans; Shadow Minister for Seniors
Liberal		Chiaka Barry MLA for Ginninderra (since 2024)		Shadow Attorney-General; Shadow Minister for Social Housing and Homelessness; Shadow Minister for Multicultural Affairs
Liberal		Leanne Castley (b. 1974) MLA for Yerrabi (since 2020)		Shadow Minister for City Services; Shadow Minister for Women and Women’s Health (since 16 April 2026); Shadow Minister for Prevention of Family and Domestic Violence
Liberal	Moderate	Elizabeth Lee (b. 1979) MLA for Kurrajong (since 2016)		Shadow Minister for Education; Shadow Minister for Environment and Climate Change; Shadow Minister for Tourism and Events
Liberal		James Milligan (b. 1979) MLA for Yerrabi (since 2021)		Shadow Minister for Business Innovation and Economic Development; Shadow Minister for Skills and Vocational Training; Shadow Minister for Sport and Recreation; Shadow Minister for Arts and Creative Industries

== Lee Shadow Ministry (2023–2024) ==
The Shadow Ministry was announced on 7 December 2023 following the deputy leadership spill on 4 December 2023 where Jeremy Hanson was voted out 5-3 in favour of Leanne Castley. Jeremy Hanson was then removed from Shadow Cabinet alongside Elizabeth Kikkert in the reshuffle.

Shadow Minister	Portfolio	Image
Elizabeth Lee MLA	Leader of the Opposition; Shadow Treasurer; Shadow Minister for Education; Shadow Minister for Housing Affordability and Choice; Shadow Minister for Climate Action, Energy and Emissions Reduction; Shadow Minister for Economic Development, Tourism and Major Projects	
Leanne Castley MLA	Shadow Minister for Health and Wellbeing; Shadow Minister for Business; Shadow Minister for Families Youth and Community Services; Shadow Minister for the Prevention of Domestic and Family Violence; Assistant Shadow Minister for Women; Assistant Shadow Minister for Environment, Heritage and Water	
Peter Cain MLA	Shadow Attorney-General; Shadow Minister for Multicultural Affairs; Shadow Minister for Planning and Land Management; Assistant Shadow Treasurer; Assistant Shadow Minister for Seniors; Assistant Shadow Minister for Veterans Affairs; Assistant Deputy Speaker	
Nicole Lawder MLA	Opposition Whip; Shadow Minister for City Services; Shadow Minister for Seniors; Shadow Minister for Women; Shadow Minister for Arts; Shadow Minister for Environment, Heritage and Water; Shadow Minister for Veterans Affairs	
James Milligan MLA	Deputy Opposition Whip; Shadow Minister for Disability; Shadow Minister for Emergency Services; Shadow Minister for Vocational Training and Skills; Shadow Minister for Sport and Recreation; Shadow Minister for Police; Shadow Minister for Aboriginal and Torres Strait Islander Affairs	
Mark Parton MLA	Deputy Speaker; Shadow Minister for Transport; Shadow Minister for Housing and Homelessness; Shadow Minister for Gaming, Racing and Community Clubs; Shadow Minister for Sustainable Building and Construction; Shadow Minister for Corrections; Assistant Shadow Minister for City Services	
Ed Cocks MLA	Shadow Minister for Mental Health; Shadow Minister for Regulatory Services; Shadow Minister for Jobs and Workplace Affairs; Assistant Minister for Arts	

== 2021-2023 ==
The shadow ministry was announced on 8 April 2021. It was formed following the resignation of former Canberra Liberals Opposition Leader Alistair Coe by Opposition Leader Elizabeth Lee.

On 2 June 2022 Giulia Jones resigned from the Legislative Assembly, and Ed Cocks was elected on countback on 20 June. Cocks was immediately elevated to Shadow Cabinet with portfolios for mental health, jobs and workplace affairs, and regulatory services. Leanne Castley retained health and wellbeing. Jeremy Hanson was elevated to Deputy Opposition Leader with the additional portfolio area for early childhood education. Peter Cain became responsible for multicultural affairs.

Shadow Minister	Portfolio	Image
Elizabeth Lee MLA	Leader of the Opposition; Shadow Treasurer; Shadow Attorney-General; Shadow Minister for Climate Action; Shadow Minister for Economic Development, Tourism and Major Projects	
Giulia Jones MLA	Deputy Leader of the Opposition; Shadow Minister for Health, Mental Health and Wellbeing; Shadow Minister for Multicultural Affairs	
Peter Cain MLA	Assistant Shadow Treasurer; Assistant Shadow Attorney-General; Shadow Minister for Regulatory Services; Shadow Minister for Jobs and Workplace Affairs; Shadow Minister for Planning and Land Management	
Leanne Castley MLA	Assistant Shadow Minister for Economic Development, Tourism and Major Projects; Shadow Minister for Environment and Heritage; Shadow Minister for Water, Energy and Emissions Reduction; Shadow Minister for Business	
Jeremy Hanson MLA	Opposition Whip; Shadow Minister for Education and Higher Education; Shadow Minister for Early Childhood Education; Shadow Minister for Police; Shadow Minister for Veterans Affairs	
Elizabeth Kikkert MLA	Shadow Minister for Families, Youth and Community Services; Shadow Minister for Prevention of Domestic and Family Violence; Shadow Minister for Corrections; Shadow Minister for Aboriginal and Torres Strait Islander Affairs	
Nicole Lawder MLA	Shadow Minister for City Services; Shadow Minister for Seniors; Shadow Minister for Women; Shadow Minister for Arts	
James Milligan MLA	Shadow Minister for Disability; Shadow Minister for Emergency Services; Shadow Minister for Vocational Training and Skills; Shadow Minister for Sport and Recreation	
Mark Parton MLA	Shadow Minister for Transport; Shadow Minister for Housing and Homelessness; Shadow Minister for Gaming, Racing and Community Clubs; Shadow Minister for Sustainable Building and Construction	

== See also ==
- Government of the Australian Capital Territory
- Opposition (Australia)
