= Chiaka Barry =

Australian politician

Chiaka Barry MLA
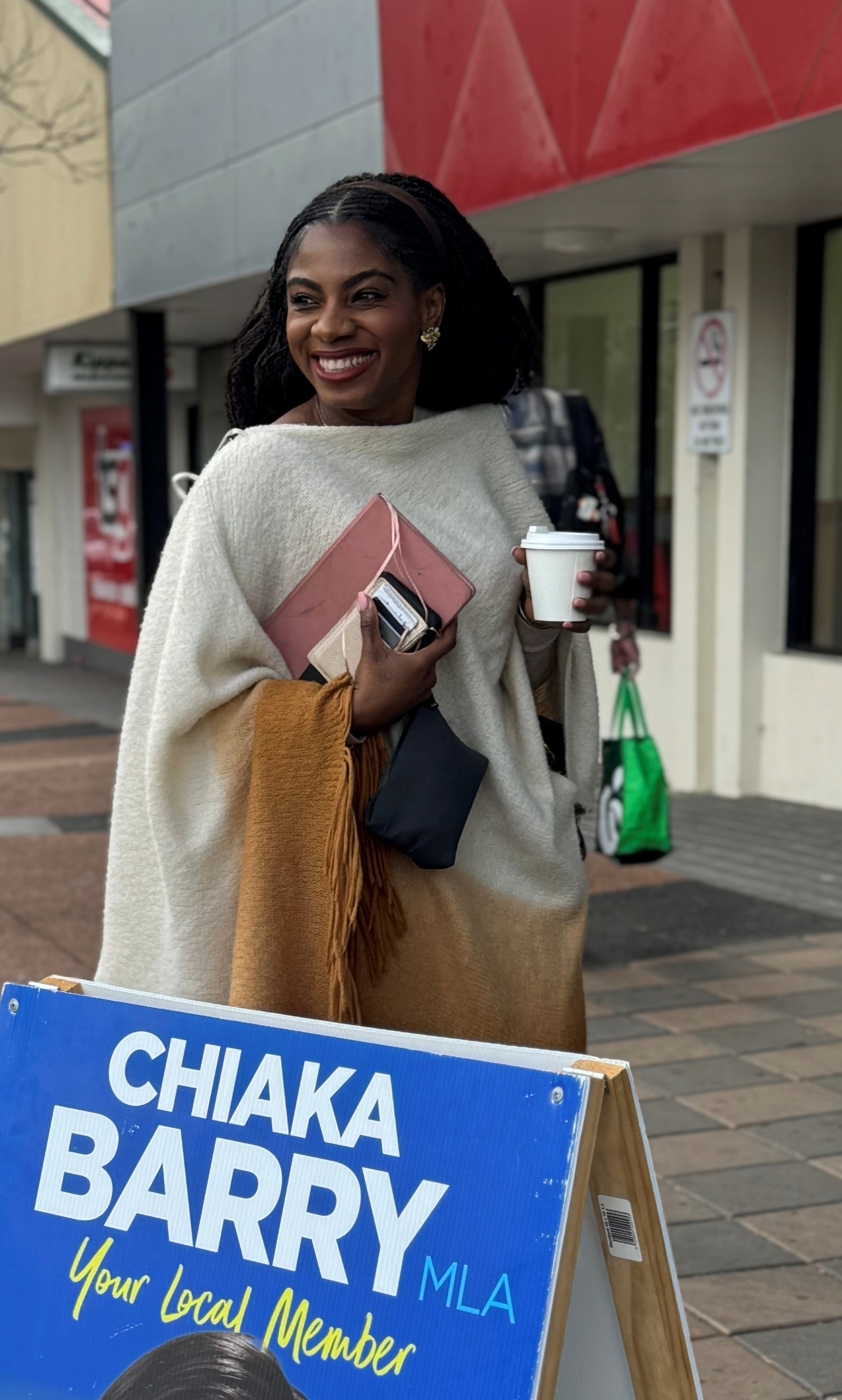
- Barry at the Kippax Fair in 2026

Member of the Australian Capital Territory Legislative Assembly for Ginninderra
- Incumbent
- Assumed office 19 October 2024
- Preceded by: Elizabeth Kikkert

Shadow Attorney-General of the ACT
- Incumbent
- Assumed office 4 December 2025

Personal details
- Born: May 1987 (age 39) Nigeria
- Citizenship: Australian
- Party: Liberal
- Children: 2
- Occupation: Politician, Lawyer

Chiaka Chioma Barry (b. May 1987) is an Australian politician who is a member of the Legislative Assembly for the Australian Capital Territory, representing the electorate of Ginninderra since 2024. She is a member of the Canberra Liberals.

== Early Life ==
Barry was born in May 1987 in Nigeria and is of Nigerian descent. She was the daughter of businesspeople, where her mother ran a catering business.

Barry emigrated from the United Kingdom to Australia in 2008 and has since resided in Canberra.

Barry worked at the ACT Director of Public Prosecutions as a paralegal within a few months of arriving in Canberra. Despite holding a law degree she was not able to practice until completing Australian qualifications. She studied law at the University of Canberra.

During this time Barry also worked as a personal care worker in an aged-care facility as well as running a catering business and a salon where she would braid hair on the weekend.

Barry worked as a solicitor in the Commonwealth Public Service and as a senior lawyer in the Department of Home Affairs on border protection. Barry also worked in the Attorney-General's department developing child protection legislation.

== Political career ==
Barry was selected by the Canberra Liberals as a candidate for Ginninderra for the 2024 election following a vacancy in the party's list in the electorate.

Barry was elected as one of two Liberals elected to the Legislative Assembly at the 2024 election, representing Ginninderra alongside Peter Cain. She succeeded Elizabeth Kikkert, who was removed from the Liberals' ticket late in the election and subsequently instead nominated as a candidate of the Family First Party.

In the ensuing spill of the Liberal leadership, Barry was reported by The Canberra Times as being "widely tipped" as a supporter of Elizabeth Lee continuing as opposition leader; ultimately, Leanne Castley defeated Lee for the leadership in a vote of 5–4.

Following the election, Barry was appointed as a shadow minister in the portfolios of community services, women, multicultural affairs and Indigenous affairs.

After Mark Parton was elected as Leader of the Opposition, Barry was appointed as Shadow Attorney-General, Social Housing and Homelessness, Multicultural Affairs and Prevention of Family and Domestic Violence

=== Domestic and Family Violence ===
On 21 October 2026, Barry moved a motion in the Legislative Assembly calling on the ACT government to identify gaps in Canberra’s domestic and family violence services within six months, rather than waiting until 2028. The motion sought clarification on what measures the government would introduce after abandoning plans for electronic monitoring of high-risk domestic and family violence offenders.

=== Arcadia House Petition ===
Barry sponsored a petition against the ACT Government's proposal of relocating Arcadia House, an alcohol and drug rehabilitation service from North Canberra Hospital to the suburban area of Cook. The petition was successful.

== Personal life ==
She was a nominee for ACT Local Hero in the ACT Australian of the Year Awards in 2022.

Barry's brother was murdered in Nigeria in July 2011.
