= Hedditch =

Hedditch is a surname. Notable people with the surname include:

- Harry Hedditch (1893–1974), Australian politician
- Mabel Emily Hedditch (1897–1966), Australian farmer and politician
