= Canberra Liberals leadership elections =

The Canberra Liberals, the division of the Liberal Party of Australia in the Australian Capital Territory (ACT), have held a number of leadership elections and deputy leadership elections. The most recent was in November 2025, with Mark Parton currently serving as party leader.

== 1974 election ==
1974 ACT Liberal Party leadership election
- 30 October 1974
| Candidate | Peter Hughes |
| Caucus vote | Won |
| Seat | Canberra |
Leader before election
Jim Leedman
Elected Leader
Peter Hughes

The 1974 ACT Liberal Party leadership election was held on 30 October 1974.

In 1966, Jim Leedman became president of the ACT Liberal Party's Canberra branch, and also served as the party's Electoral Conference president. He became president of the newly-formed Woden Valley branch later that year.

Leedman led the Liberals at the 1967 election for the Australian Capital Territory Advisory Council. He was one of two Liberals elected, and was later re-elected in 1970.

During the 1974 election campaign for the newly-formed Legislative Assembly (later House of Assembly), Leedman remained leader.

After the election, in which the Liberals won seven seats, a leadership election was held. Newly-elected Canberra MLA Peter Hughes was elected as leader, while Leedman became deputy leader.

=== Results ===
1974 ACT Liberal Party leadership election
| Faction | Candidate | Votes | % | ±% |
|---|---|---|---|---|
| Liberal | Peter Hughes | | | |
| Total votes | | 7 | | |

== 1977 election ==
1977 ACT Liberal Party leadership election
- 20 January 1977

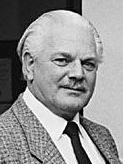
| Candidate | Jim Leedman | Trevor Kaine |
| Caucus vote | Won | Defeated |
| Seat | Canberra | Fraser |
Leader before election
Peter Hughes
Elected Leader
Jim Leedman

The 1977 ACT Liberal Party leadership election was held on 20 January 1977.

On 3 January 1977, Peter Hughes resigned as leader and from the Liberal Party to sit as an independent. Hughes stated he felt he could better serve the ACT if he was not a member of a political party.

Deputy leader Jim Leedman and Fraser MLA Trevor Kaine both sought the leadership. Leedman was successful, returning to the leadership, while Kaine was elected to the position of deputy leader.

=== Results ===
1977 ACT Liberal Party leadership election
| Faction | Candidate | Votes | % | ±% |
|---|---|---|---|---|
| Liberal | Jim Leedman | 4 or more | | |
| Liberal | Trevor Kaine | 2 or less | | |
| Total votes | | 6 | | |

== 1988 election ==
1988 ACT Liberal Party leadership election
- 10 December 1988
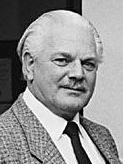

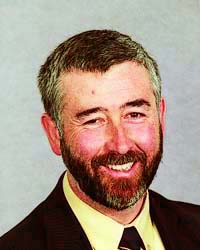
| Candidate | Trevor Kaine | Gary Humphries |
| Caucus vote | Won | Defeated |
Leader before election
Jim Leedman
Elected Leader
Trevor Kaine

The 1988 ACT Liberal Party leadership election was held on 10 December 1988.

Ahead of the 1989 ACT election, the first under self-government, the Liberal Party's ten candidates voted to decide the party's leader. Although the party's preselection committee chose branch president Gary Humphries to be first on the ticket, the candidates chose former House of Assembly member Trevor Kaine to lead.

Kaine was asked he believed more Liberals wanted Humphries as leader, and told The Canberra Times that "the candidates themselves — the people who are going to be presenting the policies and presenting the party as a potential creditable government — have decided they can sell themselves better having me as their leader than they could have done by having Gary [Humphries]."

On 13 December, Kaine announced the portfolios for the Liberal candidates:

- Trevor Kaine – Finance, economic development and ageing
- Gary Humphries – Police and justice, education and youth affairs
- Robyn Nolan – Business affairs
- Bill Stefaniak – Public Service, industrial relations and ethnic affairs
- Greg Cornwell – Health and welfare
- Lyle Dunne – Land planning and development, and environment
- Peter Kobold – Transport and employment
- Judith Dowson – Arts, heritage and women's affairs
- Peter Jansen – Housing and municipal services
- Bob Winnel – Community affairs, sport and recreation

=== Results ===
1988 ACT Liberal Party leadership election
| Faction | Candidate | Votes | % | ±% |
|---|---|---|---|---|
| Liberal | Trevor Kaine | 6 or more | | |
| Liberal | Gary Humphries | 4 or less | | |
| Total votes | | 10 | | |

== June 1991 spill ==
June 1991 ACT Liberal Party leadership spill
- 12 June 1991
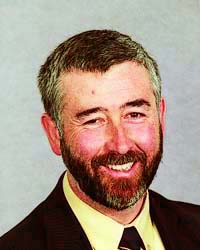

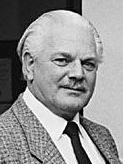
| Candidate | Gary Humphries | Trevor Kaine |
| Caucus vote | 4 | 1 |
| Percentage | 80.0% | 20.0% |
Leader before election
Trevor Kaine
Elected Leader
Gary Humphries

The June 1991 ACT Liberal Party leadership spill was held on 12 June 1991.

On 6 June, the Residents Rally – following a breakdown of the Alliance government – supported Labor in a no-confidence motion against chief minister Trevor Kaine, leading to Rosemary Follett returning to the position. Just days earlier, The Canberra Times reported that "senior Liberal sources" believed Kaine was a "poor communicator" and "intransigent", but party president Jim Leedman said Kaine's position as leader was safe.

On 12 June, deputy leader Gary Humphries launched a spill motion against Kaine, which was successful. Humphries was supported by his fellow Liberals – Robyn Nolan, David Prowse and Bill Stefaniak – while Kaine was the only MLA to vote against. (Note: The Canberra Times wrote on 13 June 1991 that "there were no dissenting votes to Mr Humphries being elected leader, although Mr Kaine abstained", however they later reported on 21 July 1991 that "it is understood that Mr Kaine received only one vote: his own".) Bill Stefaniak was elected as deputy leader.

However, Humphries did not immediately become Leader of the Opposition. Kaine said on 14 June that he did not intend to step down from the position, despite Humphries saying he believed Kaine would resign. One week later at 2:30pm on 21 June, Kaine resigned as opposition leader, the Liberal Party did not have enough votes to elect Humphries to the position. Residents Rally leader Bernard Collaery nominated Independents Group MLA Craig Duby, and after two vote (the first one having been tied at six votes each), Duby became opposition leader after independent MLA Michael Moore abstained from the second ballot. 6-and-a-half hours later, Labor voted with the Liberals (as well as Moore) to elect Humphries to the position.

=== Results ===
June 1991 ACT Liberal Party leadership spill
| Faction | Candidate | Votes | % | ±% |
|---|---|---|---|---|
| Liberal | Gary Humphries | 4 | 80.0 | |
| Liberal | Trevor Kaine | 1 | 20.0 | |
| Total votes | | 5 | | |

== July 1991 election ==
July 1991 ACT Liberal Party leadership election
- 22 July 1991
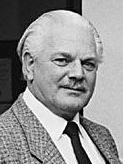
| Candidate | Trevor Kaine |
| Caucus vote | Unopposed |
Leader before election
Gary Humphries
Elected Leader
Trevor Kaine

The July 1991 ACT Liberal Party leadership election was held on 22 July 1991.

During preselection on Saturday, 20 July, the Liberal Party relegated Gary Humphries to the fifth position on the party's ticket at the next ACT election. Humphries announced he would resign as leader on Monday, 22 July, allowing for former leader Trevor Kaine to return to the position after just one month.

Opinion polling from The Canberra Times showed the Liberals were likely to win five seats, meaning Humphries would remain an MLA (which did eventuate at the 1992 election, where the Liberals won six seats and Humphries was re-elected).

Bill Stefaniak, who had been moved to the unwinnable eighth position on the Liberal ticket, resigned as deputy leader because he believed the position should be held by someone "in a winnable position". Humphries was elected to the deputy leadership.

Following his return to the leadership, Kaine signalled to fellow Liberal MLAs Robyn Nolan and David Prowse – who were both not preselected for the next election – that they should resign from the Legislative Assembly in order to make way for the party's preselected candidates. Prowse chose not to leave the party, while Nolan resigned several months later in October to form the New Conservative Group.

=== Results ===
July 1991 ACT Liberal Party leadership election
| Faction | Candidate | Votes | % | ±% |
|---|---|---|---|---|
| Liberal | Trevor Kaine | unopposed | | |
| Total votes | | 5 | | |

== 1993 spill ==
1993 ACT Liberal Party leadership spill
- 21 April 1993
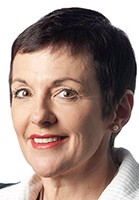
| Candidate | Kate Carnell |
| Caucus vote | Unopposed |
Leader before election
Trevor Kaine
Elected Leader
Kate Carnell

The 1993 ACT Liberal Party leadership spill was held on 21 April 1993.

During the evening of Tuesday, 20 April, Liberal MLA Tony De Domenico agreed to support Carnell over incumbent leader Trevor Kaine, ending a 3–3 stalemate that had existed within the Liberal partyroom since the July 1991 spill. At 10:30am the following day, a spill motion was moved. Kaine and Greg Cornwell, a strong Kaine supporter, learned of the spill only moments before it occurred. Kaine did not contest the spill, and Carnell was elected unopposed, becoming the ACT Liberal Party's first female leader.

De Domenico was elected unopposed as deputy leader, replacing Gary Humphries. Humphries, a longtime supporter of Carnell, said he was happy to assist the new leadership team "if that's what's involved".

The spill came just one month after a federal Liberal Party spill, where incumbent John Hewson defeated former leader John Howard. Writing in The Canberra Times, journalist Matthew Abraham wrote that "Kaine and De Domenico are fast becoming the John Howard and Andrew Peacock of the ACT Liberals"; Howard and Peacock having infamously fought for the federal Liberal leadership throughout the 1980s.

=== Results ===
1993 ACT Liberal Party leadership spill
| Faction | Candidate | Votes | % | ±% |
|---|---|---|---|---|
| Liberal | Kate Carnell | unopposed | | |
| Total votes | | 6 | | |

== 2000 election ==
2000 ACT Liberal Party leadership election
- 18 October 2000
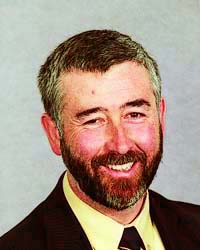
| Candidate | Gary Humphries |
| Caucus vote | Unopposed |
| Seat | Molonglo |
Leader before election
Kate Carnell
Elected Leader
Gary Humphries

The 2000 ACT Liberal Party leadership election was held on 18 October 2000.

On 25 September 2000, an ACT auditor-general's report into the Bruce Stadium redevelopment project was released, which found that the project's $27.3 million cost estimate had not undergone proper assessment, review or analysis. On 11 October, the Labor Party moved a no-confidence motion, which was scheduled to be debated on 18 October.

Although Carnell considered a number of options – including resigning as chief minister but remaining Liberal leader, calling an early election or allowing Labor to govern – it became clear that independent crossbenchers Dave Rugendyke and Paul Osborne would support the motion. She ultimately chose to resign as both chief minister and Liberal leader on 17 October, one day before the motion was scheduled to be debated.

A leadership election took place the following day, which saw deputy chief minister Gary Humphries elected as leader (and by extension, Chief Minister of the ACT) unopposed.

=== Results ===
2000 ACT Liberal Party leadership election
| Faction | Candidate | Votes | % | ±% |
|---|---|---|---|---|
| Liberal | Gary Humphries | unopposed | | |
| Total votes | | 7 | | |

== 2012 election ==
2012 Canberra Liberals leadership election
- 29 October 2012
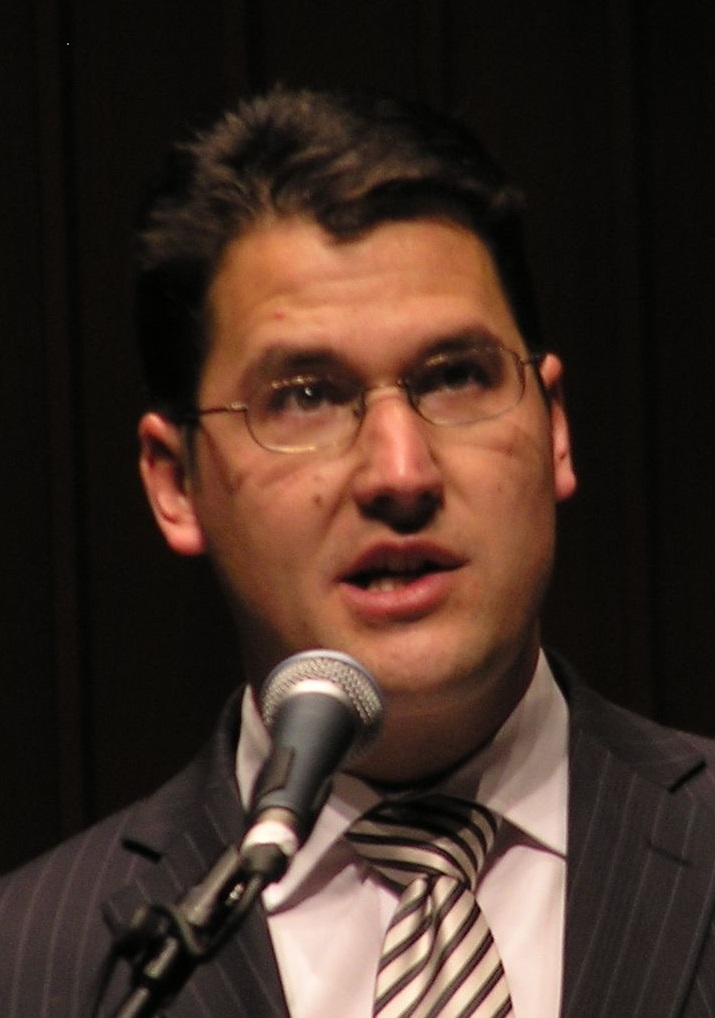
| Candidate | Zed Seselja |
| Caucus vote | Unopposed |
| Seat | Brindabella |
| Faction | Conservative |
Leader before election
Zed Seselja
Elected Leader
Zed Seselja

The 2012 Canberra Liberals leadership election was held on 29 October 2012.

Following the 2012 ACT election, neither the Liberals nor the Labor Party had won the sufficient number of seats to form government in their own right, meaning they required the support of Shane Rattenbury, the sole Greens MLA.

While negotiations were taking place, Zed Seselja was re-elected unopposed as Liberal leader and Brendan Smyth was re-elected as deputy leader.

The Liberals would ultimately remain in opposition after Rattenbury chose to support Labor on 2 November.

=== Candidates ===
| Candidate | Electorate | Faction | Announced |
|---|---|---|---|
| Zed Seselja | Brindabella | Conservative | 29 October 2012 |

=== Results ===
2012 Canberra Liberals leadership election
| Faction | Candidate | Votes | % | ±% |
|---|---|---|---|---|
| Conservative | Zed Seselja | unopposed | | |
| Total votes | | 8 | | |

== 2013 election ==
2013 Canberra Liberals leadership election
- 11 February 2013
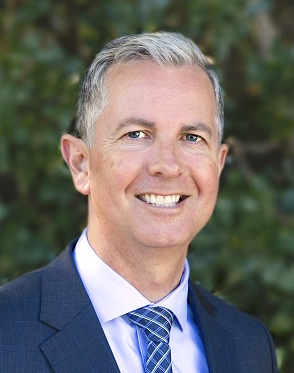

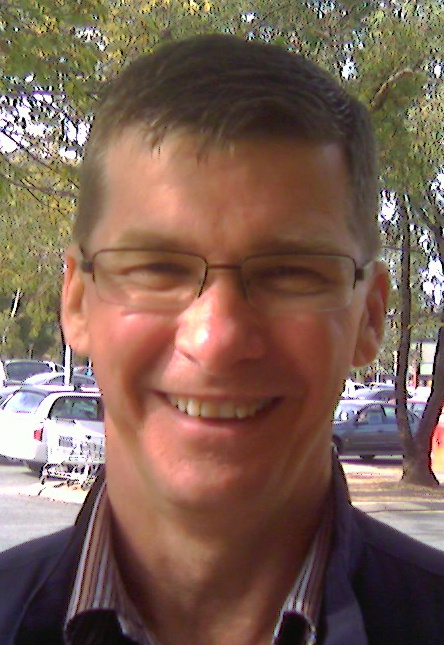
| Candidate | Jeremy Hanson | Brendan Smyth |
| Caucus vote | Won | Defeated |
| Seat | Molonglo | Brindabella |
| Faction | Conservative | Moderate |
Leader before election
Zed Seselja
Elected Leader
Jeremy Hanson

The 2013 Canberra Liberals leadership election was held on 11 February 2013.

Just four months after being re-elected as leader, Zed Seselja announced he would seek Liberal Party preselection for the 2013 federal election as a senator for the Australian Capital Territory, challenging incumbent Gary Humphries (who is himself a former ACT Liberal leader).

Liberal health spokesperson Jeremy Hanson was elected leader with a "solid majority", defeating former leader Brendan Smyth.

Seselja later won Senate preselection on 23 February, and won again in a re-election held on 27 March.

=== Candidates ===
| Candidate | Electorate | Faction | Announced |
|---|---|---|---|
| Jeremy Hanson | Molonglo | Conservative (Note: Although Jeremy Hanson is part of the part of the conservative right faction, he has also previously been considered unaligned or part of the moderate faction.) | 11 February 2013 |
| Brendan Smyth | Brindabella | Moderate | 11 February 2013 |

=== Results ===
2013 Canberra Liberals leadership election
| Faction | Candidate | Votes | % | ±% |
|---|---|---|---|---|
| Conservative | Jeremy Hanson | 5 or more | | |
| Moderate | Brendan Smyth | 3 or less | | |
| Total votes | | 8 | | |

== 2016 election ==
2016 Canberra Liberals leadership election
- 25 October 2016
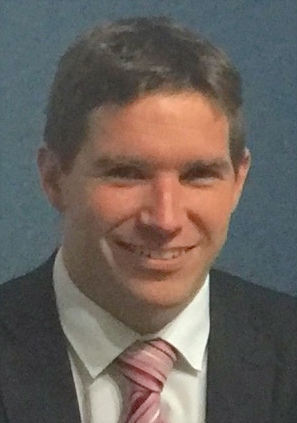
| Candidate | Alistair Coe |
| Caucus vote | Unopposed |
| Seat | Yerrabi |
| Faction | Conservative |
Leader before election
Jeremy Hanson
Elected Leader
Alistair Coe

The 2016 Canberra Liberals leadership election was held on 25 October 2016.

Following the Liberal Party's fifth consecutive loss at the 2016 ACT election, Jeremy Hanson stepped down as leader. Yerrabi MLA Alistair Coe, part of the right faction, was elected as the new Liberal leader unopposed.

Moderate faction member Nicole Lawder was elected unopposed as deputy leader, replacing Coe.

=== Candidates ===
| Candidate | Electorate | Faction | Announced |
|---|---|---|---|
| Alistair Coe | Yerrabi | Conservative | 25 October 2016 |

=== Results ===
2016 Canberra Liberals leadership election
| Faction | Candidate | Votes | % | ±% |
|---|---|---|---|---|
| Conservative | Alistair Coe | unopposed | | |
| Total votes | | 11 | | |

== 2020 election ==
2020 Canberra Liberals leadership election
- 27 October 2020
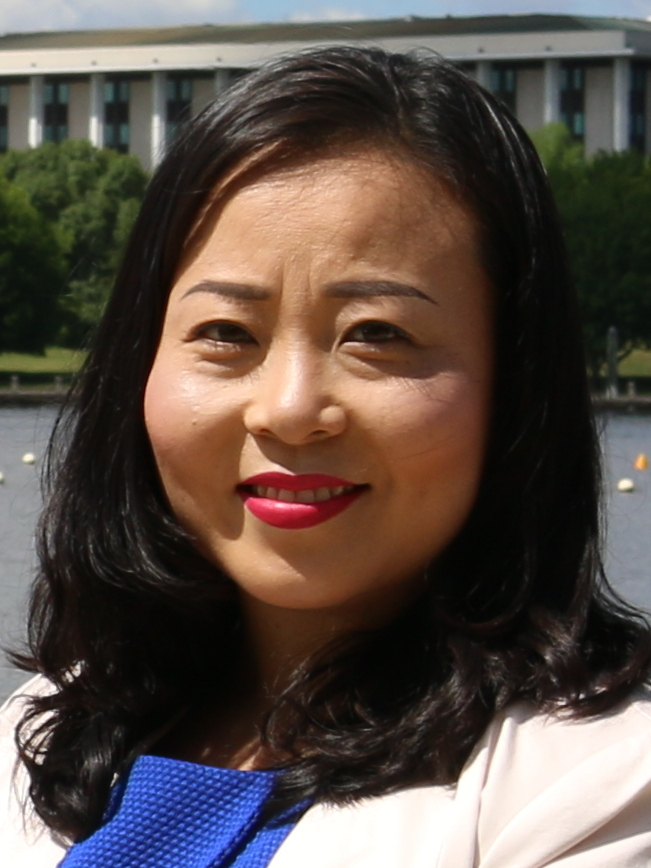

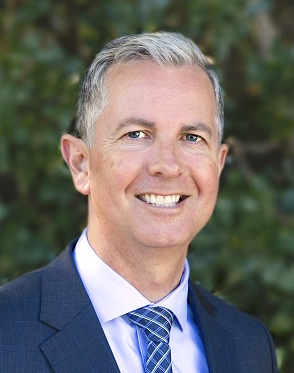
| Candidate | Elizabeth Lee | Jeremy Hanson |
| Caucus vote | Won | Defeated |
| Seat | Kurrajong | Murrumbidgee |
| Faction | Moderate | Conservative |
Leader before election
Alistair Coe
Elected Leader
Elizabeth Lee

The 2020 Canberra Liberals leadership election was held on 27 October 2020.

Following the Liberal Party's sixth consecutive loss at the 2020 ACT election, Alistair Coe stepped down as leader. Coe did not immediately confirm whether he would seek to retain the leadership, but ultimately chose not to.

The two candidates were Elizabeth Lee, the Shadow Minister for the Environment and Shadow Minister for Disability, and former Liberal leader Jeremy Hanson. Lee is a member of the moderate faction, while Hanson is part of the right faction.

Giulia Jones won the deputy leadership unopposed after Nicole Lawder stepped down. This created the first all-female political leadership team in the ACT.

=== Candidates ===
| Candidate | Electorate | Faction | Announced |
|---|---|---|---|
| Elizabeth Lee | Kurrajong | Moderate | 27 October 2020 |
| Jeremy Hanson | Murrumbidgee | Conservative | 27 October 2020 |

=== Results ===
2020 Canberra Liberals leadership election
| Faction | Candidate | Votes | % | ±% |
|---|---|---|---|---|
| Moderate | Elizabeth Lee | 5 or more | | |
| Conservative | Jeremy Hanson | 4 or less | | |
| Total votes | | 9 | | |

== 2022 deputy election ==
2022 Canberra Liberals deputy leadership election
- 1 February 2022
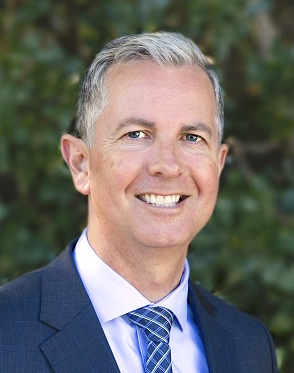
| Candidate | Jeremy Hanson |
| Caucus vote | Unopposed |
| Seat | Murrumbidgee |
| Faction | Conservative |
Deputy before election
Giulia Jones
Elected Deputy
Jeremy Hanson

The 2022 Canberra Liberals deputy leadership election was held on 1 February 2022.

On 31 February 2022, Giulia Jones announced her resignation as deputy leader. Jones cited the personal toll of the COVID-19 pandemic, along with a desire to spend more time with her family.

One day after Jones resigned, former Liberal leader Jeremy Hanson was elected unopposed as the new deputy leader.

Jones later resigned from the Legislative Assembly on 24 May 2022.

=== Candidates ===
| Candidate | Electorate | Faction | Announced |
|---|---|---|---|
| Jeremy Hanson | Murrumbidgee | Conservative | 1 February 2022 |

=== Results ===
2022 Canberra Liberals deputy leadership election
| Faction | Candidate | Votes | % | ±% |
|---|---|---|---|---|
| Conservative | Jeremy Hanson | unopposed | | |
| Total votes | | 9 | | |

== 2023 deputy spill ==
2023 Canberra Liberals deputy leadership spill
- 4 December 2023

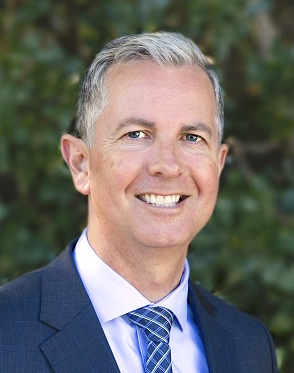
| Candidate | Leanne Castley | Jeremy Hanson |
| Caucus vote | Won | Defeated |
| Seat | Yerrabi | Murrumbidgee |
| Faction | Moderate | Conservative |
Deputy before election
Jeremy Hanson
Elected Deputy
Leanne Castley

The 2023 Canberra Liberals deputy leadership spill was held on 4 December 2023.

Jeremy Hanson was spilled as deputy leader at a partyroom meeting, following reports that he privately had "misgivings" with Elizabeth Lee's leadership. He was replaced by Yerrabi MLA Leanne Castley.

Hanson contested the spill, although the Liberal Party did not release the caucus vote numbers.

Following the spill, Hanson said he was "disappointed" but would "continue to work hard for our community as a loyal and passionate member of the Canberra Liberals team". A shadow cabinet reshuffle three days later on 7 December saw Hanson moved to the backbench.

=== Candidates ===
| Candidate | Electorate | Faction | Announced |
|---|---|---|---|
| Leanne Castley | Yerrabi | Moderate | 4 December 2023 |
| Jeremy Hanson | Murrumbidgee | Conservative | 4 December 2023 |

=== Results ===
2023 Canberra Liberals deputy leadership spill
| Faction | Candidate | Votes | % | ±% |
|---|---|---|---|---|
| Moderate | Leanne Castley | 5 or more | | |
| Conservative | Jeremy Hanson | 4 or less | | |
| Total votes | | 9 | | |

== 2024 spill ==
2024 Canberra Liberals leadership spill
- 31 October 2024
- Leadership spill

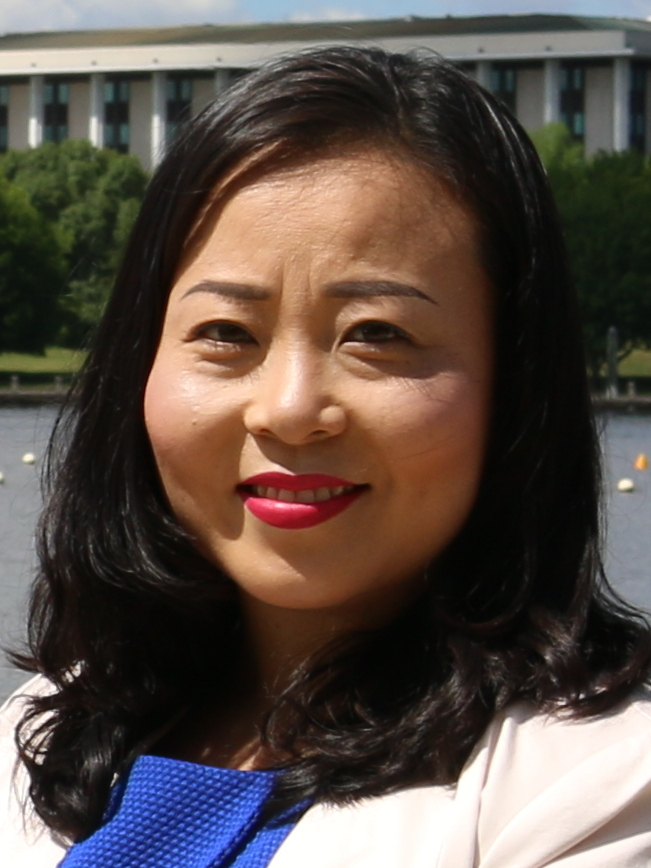
| Candidate | Leanne Castley | Elizabeth Lee |
| Caucus vote | 5 | 4 |
| Percentage | 55.5% | 44.5% |
| Seat | Yerrabi | Kurrajong |
| Faction | Moderate | Moderate |
Leader before election
Elizabeth Lee
Elected Leader
Leanne Castley
- Deputy leadership election
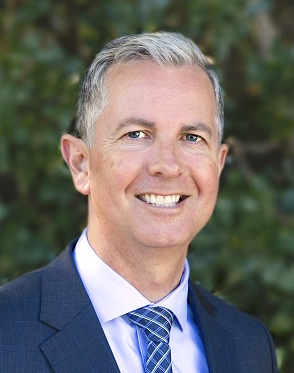

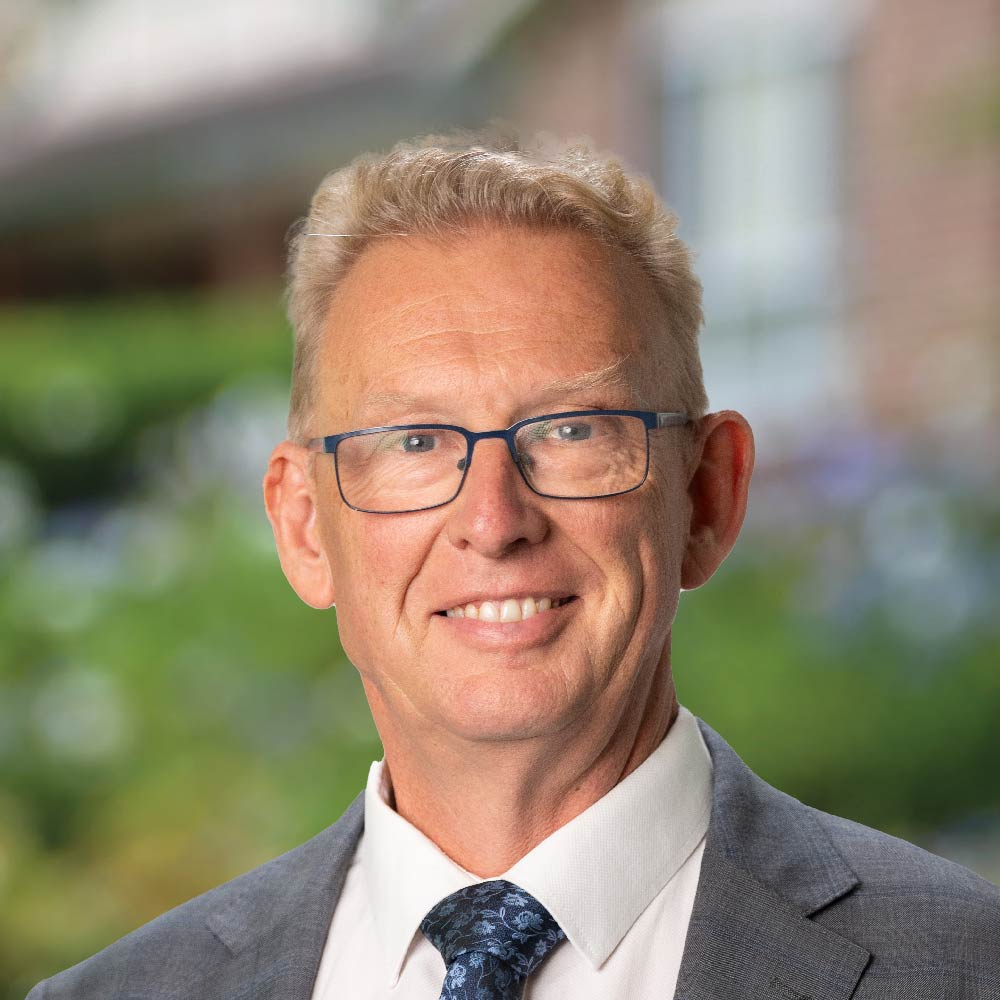
| Candidate | Jeremy Hanson | Mark Parton |
| Caucus vote | 5 | 4 |
| Percentage | 55.5% | 44.5% |
| Seat | Murrumbidgee | Brindabella |
| Faction | Conservative | Moderate |
Deputy before election
Leanne Castley
Elected Deputy
Jeremy Hanson

The 2024 Canberra Liberals leadership spill was held on 31 October 2024.

Following the Liberal Party's seventh consecutive loss at the 2024 ACT election, former Liberal leader Jeremy Hanson announced his candidacy on 21 October. Elizabeth Lee announced on 29 October that she would recontest, and received the support of Brindabella MLA Mark Parton.

However, one day before the vote, Hanson withdrew from the leadership contest and agreed to support deputy leader Leanne Castley instead. Castley won the leadership election 5 votes to 4 votes, while Hanson was elected deputy leader against Parton (also 5−4).

=== Candidates ===
| Candidate | Electorate | Faction | Announced |
|---|---|---|---|
| Elizabeth Lee | Kurrajong | Moderate | 29 October 2024 |
| Leanne Castley | Yerrabi | Moderate | 30 October 2024 |
| Jeremy Hanson (withdrew) | Murrumbidgee | Conservative | 21 October 2024 |

=== Results ===
2024 Canberra Liberals leadership election
| Faction | Candidate | Votes | % | ±% |
|---|---|---|---|---|
| Moderate | Leanne Castley | 5 | 55.5 | |
| Moderate | Elizabeth Lee | 4 | 44.5 | |
| Total votes | | 9 | 100.0 | |

== 2025 spill ==
2025 Canberra Liberals leadership spill
- 10 November 2025
- Leadership spill
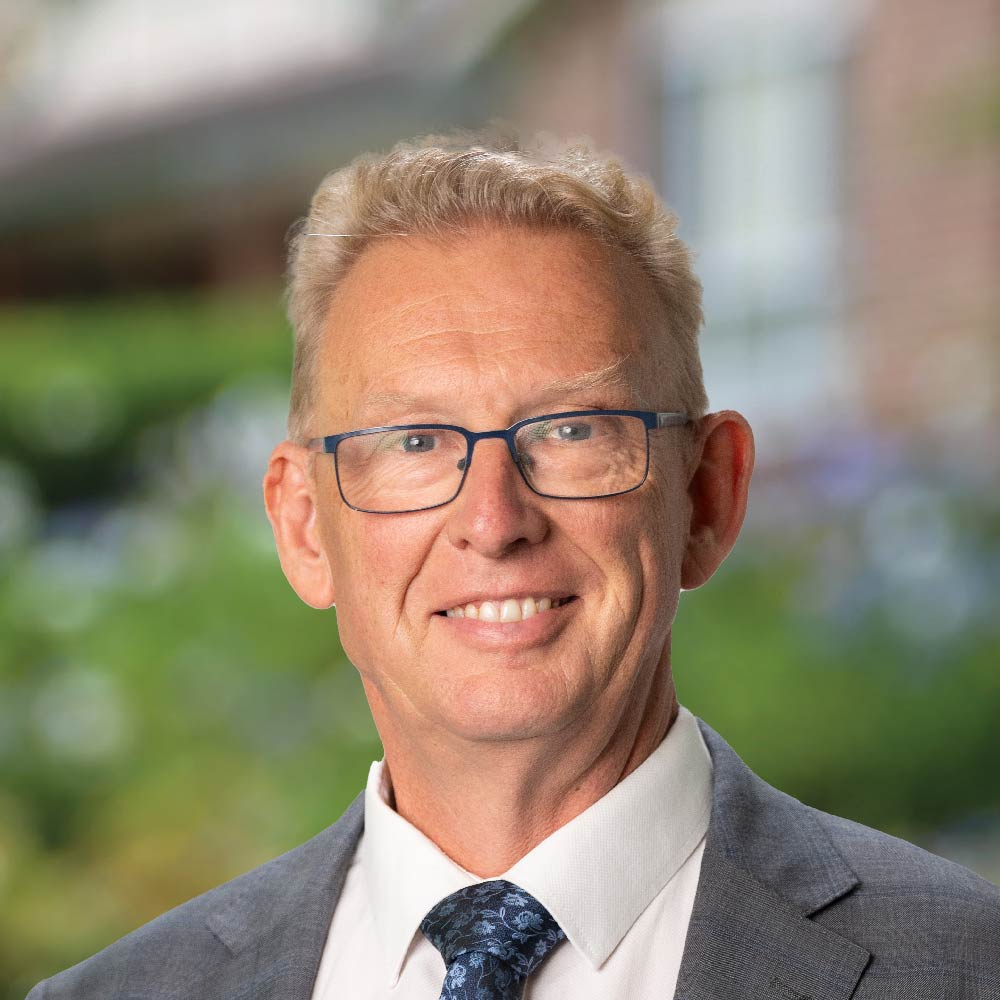
| Candidate | Mark Parton |
| Caucus vote | Unanimous |
| Percentage | 100% |
| Seat | Brindabella |
| Faction | Moderate |
Leader before election
Leanne Castley
Leader following election
Mark Parton
- Deputy leadership spill
| Candidate | Deborah Morris |
| Caucus vote | Unanimous |
| Percentage | 100% |
| Seat | Brindabella |
Deputy before election
Jeremy Hanson
Deputy following election
Deborah Morris

The 2025 Canberra Liberals leadership spill was held on 10 November 2025.

Leader Leanne Castley and Deputy Leader Jeremy Hanson resigned on 10 November and announced that neither would be re-contesting.

Mark Parton and Deborah Morris contested Leadership and Deputy Leadership respectively and we both elected unanimously.
