= Modern liberalism =

Modern liberalism may refer to:

- Social liberalism, known as "modern liberalism" in the United States
  - Modern liberalism in the United States
- Modern Liberals, a faction of the Liberal Party of Australia
