= Mabel Hedditch =

Australian politician

Mabel Hedditch OBE
- Mabel Emily Hedditch, from a 1954 newspaper article.
- Born: Mabel Emily Flux; 11 December 1897; Hambrook, Gloucestershire, England, UK
- Died: 6 January 1966 (aged 68); Portland, Victoria, Australia
- Occupations: Farmer, politician
- Known for: Mayor of Portland, Victoria, Australia
- Spouse: Norman Samuel Forward Hedditch (m. 1921-1954; his death)
- Children: 7

Mabel Emily Hedditch OBE (née Flux; 11 December 1897 – 6 January 1966) was an Australian farmer and politician, mayor of Portland, Victoria, and president of the Country Women's Association of Victoria. In the 1960 New Year Honours, she was awarded an OBE.

== Early life ==
Mabel Emily Flux was born in Hambrook, Gloucestershire, England, the daughter of farmers Alfred William Flux and Emily (Hill) Flux. She learned the trade of cheesemaking in Bristol as a young woman, and worked on her family's dairy farm and delivered milk with her sister Kit, while their brothers were serving in World War I. "I wasn't one of the glamor Land Girls, I was just a farmer, and I turned my hand to anything and everything."

== Career ==
Hedditch took over postmistress duties at Bridgewater from her mother-in-law in 1937, and continued until 1945 when the office was closed. She was the first woman elected to the Portland Town Council, serving from 1949 to 1964. During her time on the Town Council, she became a justice of the peace in 1954, and was mayor of Portland from 1956 to 1960. She was a founding member of the Country Women's Association of Victoria from 1937, and president of the statewide organisation from 1953 to 1955. She was active in the town's social services, as president of the Old Folks Welfare Committee.

In 1960, she was made an officer in the Order of the British Empire (OBE).

== Personal life ==
Mabel Emily Flux married Norman Samuel Forward Hedditch in 1921. Hedditch was an Australian farmer who served in World War I; they met when he was working on a farm in England. They had seven children together (Thomas, Margaret, Alfred, Robert, James, Catherine, and Geoffrey). Norman Hedditch died in 1954. Mabel Hedditch died at home in Portland in 1966, aged 68. Hedditch Court in Ginninderry is named for Mabel Emily Hedditch.

Her brother-in-law, Harry Hedditch, served as mayor of Portland, in the 1940s.
