= 1993 Liberal Party of Australia leadership spill =

Liberal Party of Australia Leadership spill, 1993
- 23 March 1993

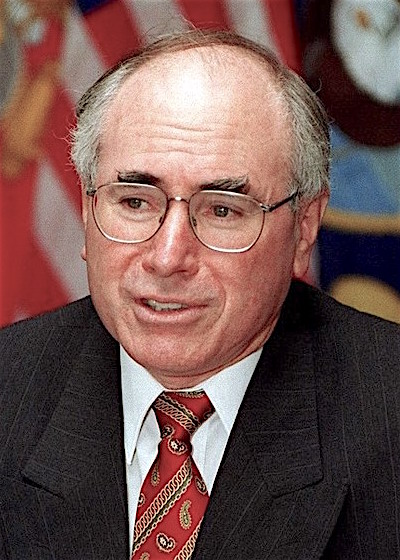
			LIB
Candidate	John Hewson	John Howard	Bruce Reid
Caucus vote	47	30	1
Percentage	60.2%	38.4%	1.4%
Seat	Wentworth (NSW)	Bennelong (NSW)	Bendigo (Vic.)
Leader before election
John Hewson
Elected Leader
John Hewson

A spill of the leadership of the Liberal Party of Australia took place on 23 March 1993, following the 1993 federal election. The spill was won by incumbent leader John Hewson over former leader John Howard by 47 votes to 30 while backbencher Bruce Reid attracted only one sole vote, presumably his own. For the Deputy leadership Michael Wooldridge won against Peter Costello.

== Background ==
After John Hewson was blamed for losing the 1993 "unloseable election" because of his staunch promotion of a Goods and Services Tax, and an inability to sell his policies to voters, Hewson initially stated he would not recontest but was convinced to do so to block John Howard from winning.

== Candidates ==
- John Hewson, incumbent Leader, Member for Wentworth
- John Howard, Shadow Minister for Industrial Relations, Employment and Training, Member for Bennelong
- Bruce Reid, Member for Bendigo

== Results ==
Liberal Party of Australia deputy leadership ballot, 1993

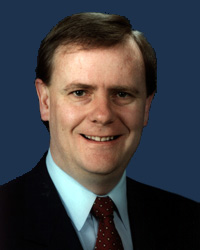
	LIB
Candidate	Michael Wooldridge	Peter Costello
Final ballot	45 (57.1%)	33 (42.9%)
Seat	Casey (Vic.)	Higgins (Vic.)
Deputy Leader before election
Peter Reith
Elected Deputy Leader
Michael Wooldridge

The following tables gives the ballot results:

=== Leadership ballot ===
Name	Votes	Percentage
John Hewson	47	60.2
John Howard	30	38.4
Bruce Reid	1	1.4

=== Deputy leadership ballot ===
Candidate	Final ballot	%
Michael Wooldridge	45	57.1
Peter Costello	33	42.9

Other candidates in order of elimination:

- Ken Aldred, David Connolly and Alexander Downer
- Wilson Tuckey
- Peter Reith
- David Jull

== Aftermath ==
Over the following year Hewson's leadership was undermined by the likes of Peter Costello and Bronwyn Bishop. This led to his defeat in May 1994 by Alexander Downer.

The spill was brought on by the election loss and the poorly viewed Goods and Services Tax policy. This tax would eventually become a key Howard government policy, even with Howard's attacks on Hewson, the 1993 loss, and the policy.

== See also ==
- 1993 ACT Liberal Party leadership spill
