= Elizabeth Kikkert =

Australian politician

Member of the Australian Capital Territory Legislative Assembly for Ginninderra
- In office 15 October 2016 – 19 October 2024
- Preceded by: Alistair Coe
- Succeeded by: Chiaka Barry

Personal details
- Born: 3 July 1980 (age 45) Tonga
- Party: Family First (since 2024)
- Other political affiliations: Liberal Party (until 2024)
- Children: 5

Elisapeta Kilinganoa Kikkert (born 3 July 1980) is an Australian former politician. She was a member of the Australian Capital Territory Legislative Assembly from 2016 until losing her seat in 2024, representing the electorate of Ginninderra. From 2016 until 2024 she was a member of the Canberra Liberals, until being disendorsed and removed from the party.

She was born in Tonga and was a full-time mother and volunteer before entering politics. She is also a practising member of the Church of Jesus Christ of Latter-day Saints, and she has five children.

Kikkert was disendorsed as a candidate by the Canberra Liberals in September 2024 ahead of the 2024 ACT election and removed from the Liberal Party over alleged breaches of the Electoral Act and allegations of bullying of party staff. She joined the Family First Party on 24 September 2024, and was their candidate for the Division of Fenner in the 2025 federal election.
