= Mark Parton =

Australian politician (born 1966)

Mark Parton MLA
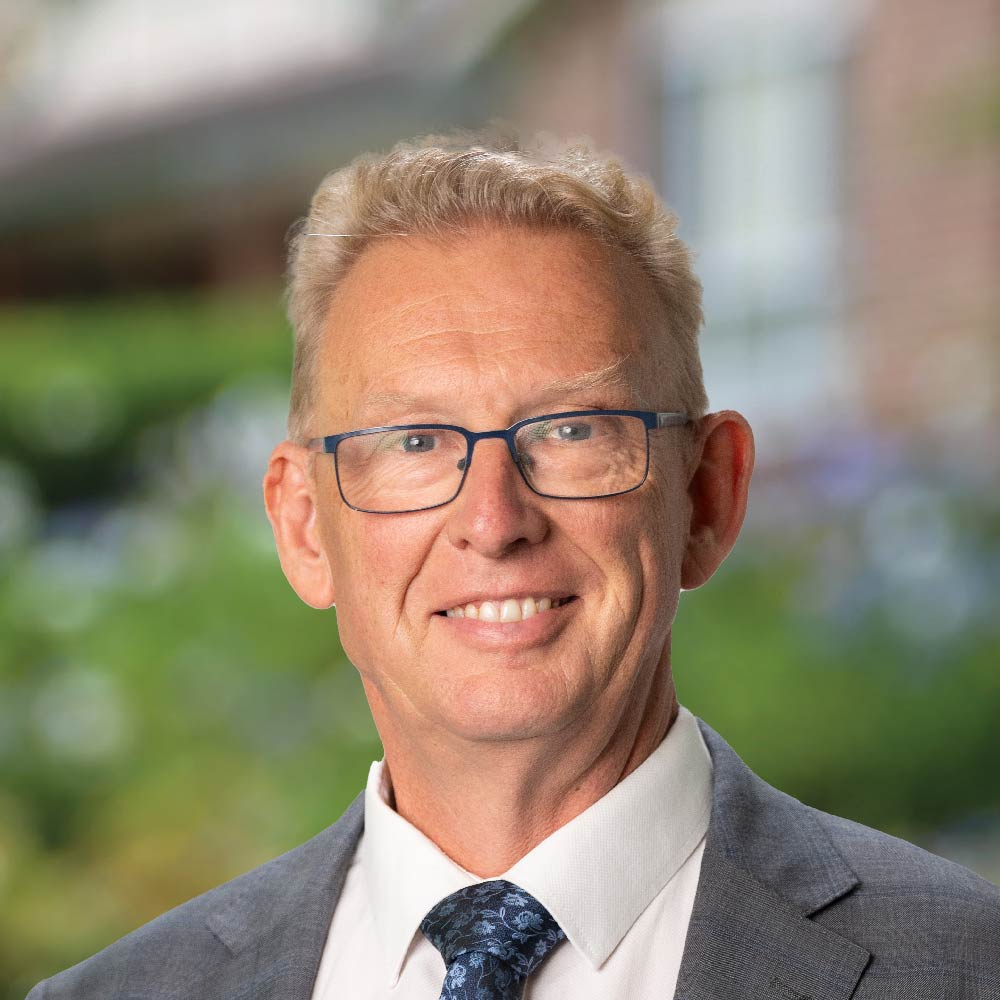
- Parton in 2024

16th Leader of the Opposition in the Australian Capital Territory
- Incumbent
- Assumed office 10 November 2025
- Deputy: Deborah Morris
- Preceded by: Leanne Castley

13th Leader of the Canberra Liberals
- Incumbent
- Assumed office 10 November 2025
- Deputy: Deborah Morris
- Preceded by: Leanne Castley

8th Speaker of the Australian Capital Territory Legislative Assembly
- In office 6 November 2024 – 10 November 2025
- Deputy: Andrew Braddock
- Preceded by: Joy Burch
- Succeeded by: Andrew Braddock (acting); Jeremy Hanson

Member of the Australian Capital Territory Legislative Assembly for Brindabella
- Incumbent
- Assumed office 15 October 2016
- Preceded by: Val Jeffery

Personal details
- Born: Mark Stuart Parton; 24 September 1966 (age 59) York, Western Australia
- Party: Liberal (since 2016)
- Other political affiliations: Independent (until 2016)
- Profession: Radio broadcaster
- Cabinet: Parton shadow ministry
- Committees: Administration and Procedure
- Portfolio: Men and Men's Health; Transport; Gaming and Racing; Aboriginal and Torres Strait Islander Affairs
- Website: www.markparton.com.au

Mark Stuart Parton (born 24 September 1966) is an Australian politician who is currently serving as leader of the Canberra Liberals and Leader of the Opposition of the Australian Capital Territory since November 2025. He has been a Liberal member of the Legislative Assembly since 2016, representing the electorate of Brindabella. He was a long-running local radio announcer on 2CC before entering politics.

== Early life ==
Mark Stuart Parton was born the second child of husband and wife Tom and Jackie Parton in 1966. Tom was a grocer and Mark was the couple's second child.

Parton began a life in media at age 13 when he began writing a fortnightly column in the Beverley York Express.

== Radio career ==
Before entering parliament, Parton ran a marketing business. He had worked in commercial radio for 30 years, starting at age 17 in 6AM in Northam, Western Australia, and working in several different states, with the last 16 years in breakfast programs in Canberra on 2CC.

== Political career ==
Parton first ran for the ACT Legislative Assembly as an ungrouped independent in Ginninderra in 2008 where he received 6.3% of the vote, coming in fifth place on primary and seventh after the distribution of preferences.

Parton ran again for the assembly as a member of the Canberra Liberals in Brindabella in 2016 where he received 10.6% of the vote, coming in second place on primary and being elected fourth after the distribution of preferences.

Following the 2024 election, Parton was elected as Speaker and on 10 November 2025, following the resignation of incumbent Leanne Castley, he was elected leader of the Canberra Liberals and Leader of the Opposition.

== Political positions ==
Parton is a member of the moderate faction within the Liberal party.

=== Voice Referendum ===
On 19 April 2023, Parton became one of two ACT Liberals to announce his support for an Indigenous Voice to Parliament, putting him at odds with some of his party colleagues. He had previously leaned towards a No vote in the referendum though changed his mind after discussions with the Noongar communities in Western Australia. Parton himself has Noongar heritage, but "[does] not identify as Aboriginal".

=== Queer rights ===
Parton was one of four ACT Liberal MLA's who supported the Yes campaign in the 2017 marriage equality postal survey and was a member of the Libs and Nats for Yes group.

At the 2024 territory election, Parton controversially opined that ACT Greens candidate Jonathan Davis would not win his seat in Brindabella because he was "too camp for Tuggeranong" during a conversation between the two candidates on the campaign trail. He later apologised for the comment after a Facebook account using Liberal branding began leaving homophobic comments on posts from Davis. Davis said that he did not think that Parton was homophobic, but was surprised that he thought his sexuality should be a campaign issue and claimed it showed a level on ignorance on how tolerant and socially progressive voters in Tuggeranong were.

=== Gender ===
Parton has been a vocal advocate of addressing the high rates at which men committ suicide in Australia.

In 2017, during a debate on a motion on diversity and inclusion in Canberra, Parton controversially claimed that "if you are a heterosexual white male over the age of 30, you're not really included in anything" and said that inclusion should be about everyone, highlighting the high rates of suicide for men aged 30 to 54. The comment was labeled distressing by Chief Minister Andrew Barr in the context of the broader debate on marriage equality that was ongoing at the time and Parton was compared to Donald Trump by Labor backbencher Chris Steel, both critics were gay men.

In 2026, Parton unveiled a reshuffle of his shadow cabinet which created two gendered portfolios of Shadow Minister for Men and Men's Health and Shadow Minister for Women and Women's Health. The men's portfolio has been held by Parton since its creation.

=== Multiculturalism ===
Parton has long been a supporter of multiculturalism, praising it in his inaugural speech to the Legislative Assembly in 2016.

In 2026, following the address by Pauline Hanson to the National Press Club of Australia where she called for Australia to abandon multiculturalism become a monoculture, Parton told the One Nation leader to "go to hell" on social media and labeling One Nation a "whingeing, grievance echo chamber".

== Personal life ==
Parton was born on 24 September 1966 in York, Western Australia. He is married, with three children and three step-children.

Parton's wife is Colombian and their household is bilingual, speaking both English and Spanish.

He has long been aware of having Aboriginal heritage, but in 2022 researched his family history to find the details.

Parton has admitted to having a caffeine addiction.

Parton is a frequent user of the social media platform TikTok, and was briefly ejected from ACT's parliament in 2020 after releasing a video that was alleged to breach parliamentary filming rules.

== Electoral history ==
Year	Electorate	Party	First preference result					Result at exclusion/election				Result
Year	Electorate	Party	Votes	%	±%	Quota	Position	Votes	%	Quota	Position	Result
2008	Ginninderra	Independent	3,785	6.3	▲6.3	0.38	Fifth	5,690	9.5	0.57	Seventh	Not elected
2016	Brindabella	Canberra Liberals	4,962	10.6	▲10.6	0.64	Second				Fourth	Elected
2020	Brindabella	Canberra Liberals	6,218	11.2	▲0.6	0.67	Third				Fourth	Elected
2024	Brindabella	Canberra Liberals	9,606	16.5	▲5.3	0.99	First				First	Elected

== Awards ==
Year	Award	Category		Work	Result	Ref
2012	Australian Commercial Radio Awards	Provincial	Best Talk Presenter	2CC	Nominated	
2013	Australian Commercial Radio Awards	Provincial	Best Talk Presenter	2CC	Won	
2014	Australian Commercial Radio Awards	Provincial	Best Talk Presenter	2CC	Won	
2014	Australian Commercial Radio Awards	Non-Metropolitan	Best Current Affairs Presenter	2CC	Nominated	
2015	Australian Commercial Radio Awards	Provincial	Best Talk Presenter	2CC	Won	
2015	Australian Commercial Radio Awards	Non-Metropolitan	Best Current Affairs Presenter	2CC	Won	

Australian Capital Territory Legislative Assembly
Preceded by Val Jeffery	Member for Brindabella; 2016–present	Incumbent
Preceded by Joy Burch	Speaker of the Australian Capital Territory Legislative Assembly; 2024–2025	Succeeded by Jeremy Hanson
Political offices
Preceded by Leanne Castley	Leader of the Opposition of Australian Capital Territory; 2025–present	Incumbent
Party political offices
Preceded by Leanne Castley	Leader of the Canberra Liberals; 2025–present	Incumbent
