= Alistair Coe =

Australian politician

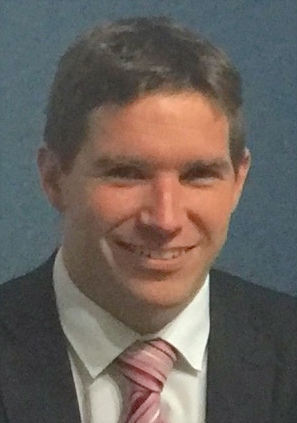
- Coe in October 2016

Leader of the Opposition of the Australian Capital Territory Elections: 2020
- In office 25 October 2016 – 27 October 2020
- Deputy: Nicole Lawder
- Preceded by: Jeremy Hanson
- Succeeded by: Elizabeth Lee

Member of the Australian Capital Territory Legislative Assembly for Yerrabi
- In office 15 October 2016 – 12 March 2021
- Succeeded by: James Milligan

Member of the Australian Capital Territory Legislative Assembly for Ginninderra
- In office 29 October 2008 – 15 October 2016
- Preceded by: Bill Stefaniak
- Succeeded by: Elizabeth Kikkert

Personal details
- Born: Alistair Bruce Coe; 9 January 1984 (age 42) Canberra, Australian Capital Territory, Australia
- Party: Liberal
- Spouse: Yasmin Coe
- Education: Australian National University

Alistair Bruce Coe (born 9 January 1984) is an Australian politician and a former leader of the Liberal Party and Leader of the Opposition in the Australian Capital Territory (ACT). He was a member of the ACT Legislative Assembly from 2008 to 2021, representing the Ginninderra electorate from 2008 to 2016 and the Yerrabi electorate from 2016 to 2021. As Opposition Leader Coe led the Liberal Party to defeat at the 2020 election. He chose not to re-contest the party's leadership position, and resigned from the Assembly in 2021.

== Legislative Assembly ==
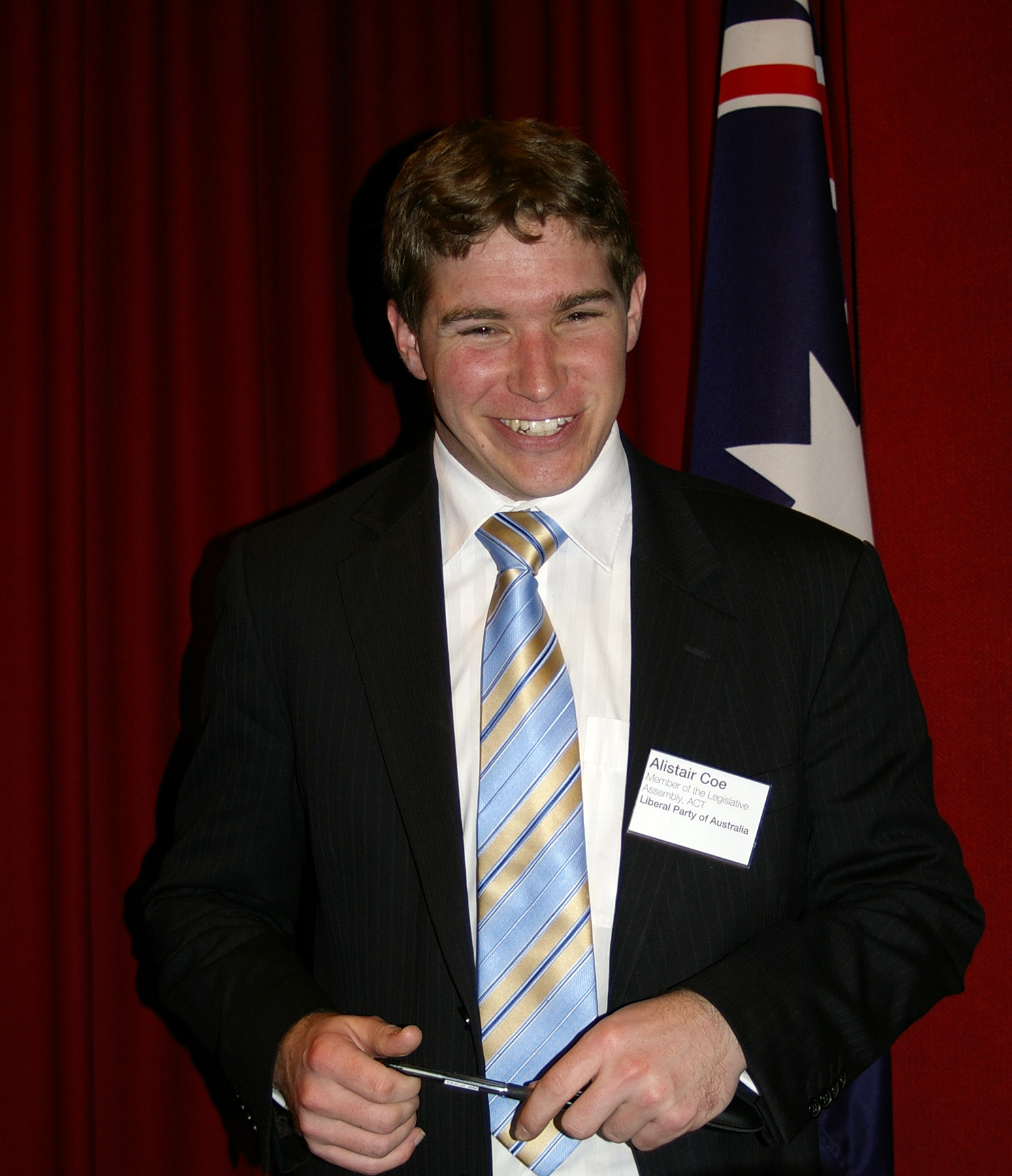
Coe at the Australian War Memorial in 2009

Coe's first speech in the ACT Legislative Assembly was on 9 December 2008.

His portfolio responsibilities from 2008 to 2012 were as Shadow Minister for Urban Services, for Transport Services, for Housing, for Heritage, and for Youth. From 2012, Coe's responsibilities included Shadow Minister for Territory and Municipal Services, for Planning & Infrastructure, for Transport, and for Heritage.

At the 2012 election, Coe was returned with a quota of 0.9.

When Zed Seselja, then Leader of the Opposition, mounted a bid to win preselection for the Senate for the 2013 Australian federal election, Coe was elected as Deputy Leader of the Liberals.

=== Leader of the Opposition ===
In the wake of a fifth consecutive Liberal defeat in the 2016 election, former leader Jeremy Hanson resigned, and Coe was elected as his replacement with Nicole Lawder as his deputy.

During the Australian Marriage Law Postal Survey, Coe was the only federal, state or territory party leader to oppose same-sex marriage.

Coe led the Canberra Liberals to the 2020 election. His party faced an uphill battle as soon as the campaign began, with the Greens declaring they would not support a Liberal coalition government. This almost certainly meant that the Liberals had to win a majority in order to govern, something only ever done once in ACT history.

Ultimately, the Liberals were defeated at the election, losing 2 seats. Coe conceded on election night, when it became apparent that a Labor-Greens coalition would return to power. On 27 October 2020, Coe was replaced by Elizabeth Lee as Leader of the Canberra Liberals and Leader of the Opposition. On 24 January 2021 Coe announced his forthcoming resignation from the Legislative Assembly, which became effective on 12 March 2021.

== Personal life ==
Alistair Coe and Yasmin were married on 9 March 2013, at St Paul's Church, Manuka. He identifies as member of the Anglican Church and is anti-abortion.

He was the Deputy Chairman of the International Young Democrat Union in 2011.

== See also ==
Political offices
Preceded by Jeremy Hanson	Leader of the Opposition; 2016–2020	Succeeded by Elizabeth Lee
