= Elizabeth Lee (politician) =

Australian politician

Elizabeth Lee MLA
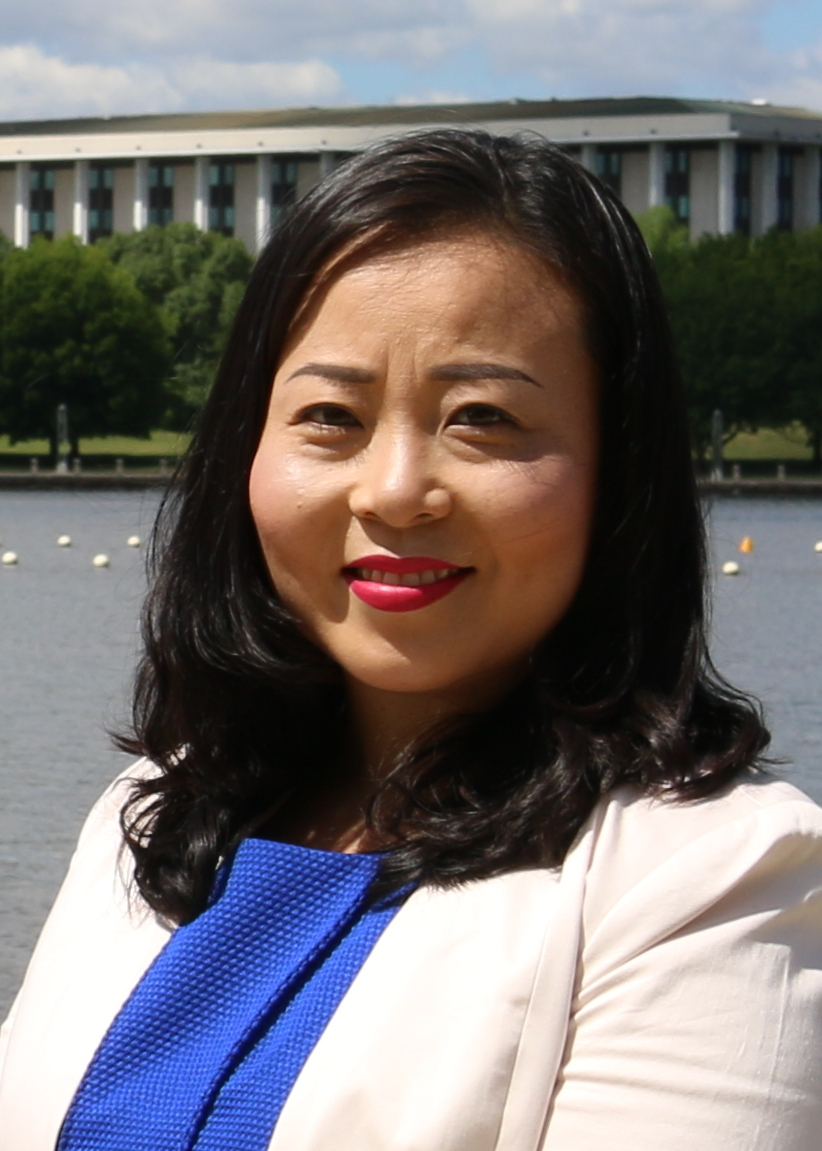
- Lee in 2016

Leader of the Opposition in the Australian Capital Territory
- In office 27 October 2020 – 31 October 2024
- Deputy: Giulia Jones; Jeremy Hanson; Leanne Castley
- Preceded by: Alistair Coe
- Succeeded by: Leanne Castley

Member of the Australian Capital Territory Legislative Assembly for Kurrajong
- Incumbent
- Assumed office 15 October 2016

Personal details
- Born: Lee Seulgi; 30 August 1979 (age 47) Gwangju, South Korea
- Party: Liberal
- Education: Australian National University

- Elizabeth Lee
- Hangul: 이슬기
- RR: I Seulgi
- MR: I Sŭlgi
- IPA: [isʰɯɭɡi]

Elizabeth Lee (born 30 August 1979) is an Australian politician. She has been a member of the Liberal Party and has served in the Australian Capital Territory Legislative Assembly since 2016, representing the electorate of Kurrajong. Before entering the ACT Legislative Assembly, Lee worked as a lawyer, before becoming a lecturer at the Australian National University and University of Canberra.

On 27 October 2020, Lee was elected Leader of the Canberra Liberals and became Leader of the Opposition of the Australian Capital Territory, leading them to the 2024 election, where they were defeated. She was replaced as leader by Leanne Castley in the aftermath of the election. Lee was the first Asian Australian leader of a state or territory opposition.

== Early life ==
Lee migrated to Australia from Korea at the age of seven. Upon turning 18, she moved to Canberra to pursue studies in law and Asian studies at the Australian National University.

She completed Bachelors of Law and Asian Studies, a Graduate Diploma in legal practice, and a Masters of Law from the Australian National University, and worked as a law lecturer and solicitor.

== Political career ==
Lee ran unsuccessfully for the Australian Capital Territory Legislative Assembly in the Molonglo electorate in 2012, and for the Australian House of Representatives seat of Fraser in 2013, both times representing the Liberal Party. She was elected to the Legislative Assembly in 2016 representing the new seat of Kurrajong.

In Alistair Coe's shadow ministry, Lee was made Shadow Minister for the Environment and Shadow Minister for Disability in December 2016. In February 2018 following the death of Steve Doszpot, the Education portfolio was added to Lee's responsibilities.

Following the Liberal Party's defeat at the 2020 election, Lee was elected on 27 October 2020 to replace Coe as party leader and Leader of the Opposition. She is the first East Asian-Australian to lead a major political party in Australia.

In 2021, Lee introduced Australian-first stealthing laws, which criminalised the non-consensual removal of a condom during sex. She also released an exposure draft for legislation that would mean harsher penalties for perpetrators of domestic violence.

Following a Shadow Cabinet reshuffle on 7 December 2023, Lee became Shadow Minister for Education alongside her existing shadow portfolio responsibilities Housing Affordability and Choice. Climate Action, Energy and Emissions Reduction. Economic Development, Tourism and Major Projects, as well as Shadow Treasurer.

During campaigning for the 2024 election, Lee made headlines when she was filmed flicking her middle finger at a journalist after an argument with a journalist.

After leading the Liberals to their seventh consecutive loss at the 2024 election. By tradition, the Liberal party leadership is spilt after election losses. She would lose her reelection bid after her own deputy Leanne Castley ran against her. Castley announced that she had run against Lee due to concerns about trying to form government with the Greens in the aftermath of the election.

Lee was suspended from the Liberal party room on 28 October 2025 after she crossed the floor to vote against reducing the number of sitting weeks.

== Political positions ==
=== Voice to Parliament Referendum ===
Lee voted Yes on the 2023 Voice to Parliament referendum, supporting the "Libs for Yes" campaign organised by former Liberal Chief Minister Kate Carnell.

=== Territory rights ===
Lee is in support of 'territory rights' for the ACT. In 2018, Lee was one of four Liberals who voted alongside Labor to rebuke federal senators for voting against the rights of the territory. In a 2023 letter written by Lee on behalf of the Canberra Liberals, Lee stated that her party supports territory rights.

== Personal life ==
Lee was born in Gwangju, South Korea and migrated to Australia in 1986 when she was seven years old. She grew up in Western Sydney and moved to Canberra at 18 to study law and Asian Studies at the Australian National University. She has lived and worked in inner Canberra since 1998.

Lee lives in the inner south with her partner, Nathan, and 2 daughters.

Political offices
Preceded by Alistair Coe	Leader of the Opposition; 2020–2024	Succeeded by Leanne Castley
