= Leanne Castley =

Australian politician (born 1974)

Leanne Castley MLA

Member of the Australian Capital Territory Legislative Assembly for Yerrabi
- Incumbent
- Assumed office 17 October 2020
- Preceded by: James Milligan

15th Leader of the Opposition
- In office 31 October 2024 – 10 November 2025
- Deputy: Jeremy Hanson
- Preceded by: Elizabeth Lee
- Succeeded by: Mark Parton

12th Leader of the Canberra Liberals
- In office 31 October 2024 – 10 November 2025
- Deputy: Jeremy Hanson
- Preceded by: Elizabeth Lee
- Succeeded by: Mark Parton
Deputy leadership roles
Deputy Leader of the Opposition
In office 4 December 2023 – 31 October 2024
| Leader | Elizabeth Lee |
| Preceded by | Jeremy Hanson |
| Succeeded by | Jeremy Hanson |
Deputy Leader of the Canberra Liberals
In office 4 December 2023 – 31 October 2024
| Leader | Elizabeth Lee |
| Preceded by | Jeremy Hanson |
| Succeeded by | Jeremy Hanson |

Personal details
- Born: 1974 (age 51–52)
- Party: Independent (since 2026)
- Other political affiliations: Liberal (until 2026)
- Cabinet: Castley shadow ministry

Leanne Castley (born 1974) is an Australian politician serving as a member for Yerrabi in the ACT Legislative Assembly. Formerly Leader of the Canberra Liberals and Leader of the Opposition from 2024 to 2025, she left the party on 3 June 2026 and currently sits as an independent.

== Political career ==
Castley ran for the 2019 Australian Federal Election as the Liberal Party candidate for the Division of Fenner but was unsuccessful. Castley put her hand up for the 2020 Australian Capital Territory election and won one of the five seats in Yerrabi, replacing one of the incumbent Liberals James Milligan. Following her election Castley was immediately named as Assistant Shadow Minister for Economic Development, Assistant Shadow Minister for Tourism and Major Projects, Shadow Minister for Environment and Heritage, Shadow Minister for Water, Energy and Emissions Reduction, and Shadow Minister for Business as of part of Elizabeth Lee's new Shadow Cabinet.

Castley was elected as Deputy Leader of the Opposition following a deputy leadership spill on 4 December 2023, replacing Jeremy Hanson. After the Opposition shadow cabinet reshuffle on 7 December 2023, Castley gained the shadow portfolios of Families, Youth and Community Services and Prevention of Domestic and Family Violence, as well as the assistant shadow portfolios of Women and Arts. Those portfolios were added to her existing portfolios of Business and Health and Wellbeing.

Castley was elected as Liberal leader on 31 October 2024 after the party's seventh consecutive loss at the 2024 ACT election, defeating Lee in a leadership spill. She resigned from the leadership on 10 November 2025 and was succeeded by Mark Parton.

On 3 June 2026, Castley announced that she had left the Liberal Party, citing a toxic internal party culture including "bullying, intimidation, lies and a threat of physical assault". She denied speculation that she might join One Nation which had established a branch in the ACT the previous year. She would remain an MLA, sitting as an independent, "with the same Liberal values", for the remainder of her term.

== Personal life ==
Castley was born in the rural NSW town of Gunnedah, however grew up in the Canberra suburb of Charnwood. In her inaugural speech Castley described herself as "just a chick from Charny" and a battler. In her youth Castley often found herself at her grandparents sheep and cattle farm at Bookham, beyond Yass, mustering sheep and riding dirt bikes.

Castley owned and operated a car yard business that failed during the 2008 financial crisis.

Castley went on to work at an IT Help Desk before gaining a Diploma in Project Management and working at AFP and the Department of Defence as a manager.

Castley is a country music singer who regularly performs at local pubs and clubs in Canberra, and has written her own album Perfect Day.
