= Leader of the Opposition (Australian Capital Territory) =

Leader of the Opposition of the Australian Capital Territory
- Coat of arms of the Australian Capital Territory

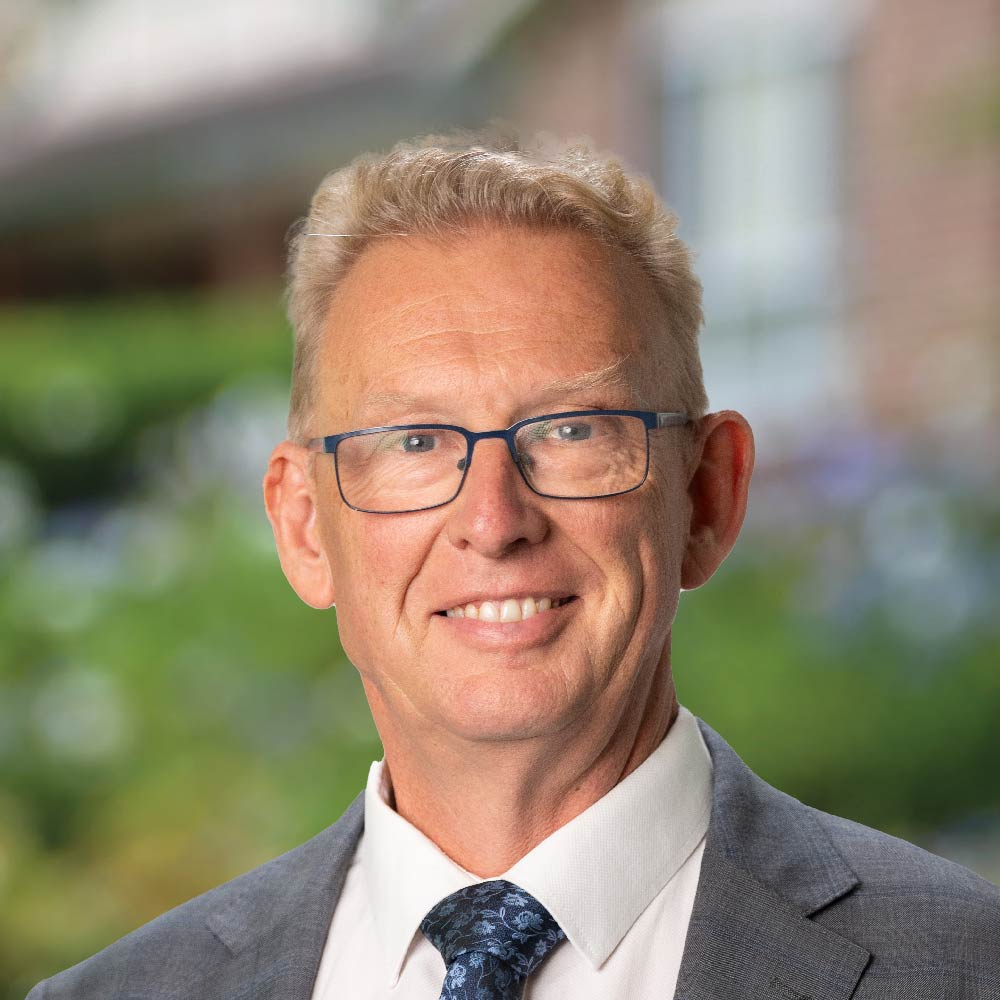
- Incumbent; Mark Parton since 10 November 2025
- Opposition
- Style: The Honourable
- Member of: Legislative Assembly; Shadow Cabinet
- Nominator: Largest non-governing party
- Appointer: ACT Legislative Assembly
- Inaugural holder: Trevor Kaine
- Formation: 11 May 1989
- Deputy: Deborah Morris
- Salary: $132,158 (additional) $320,956 (total) (Note: The Leader of the Opposition receives a remuneration of $132,158 on top of the $188,798 base salary for a member of the Legislative Assembly)

The leader of the opposition of the Australian Capital Territory, is an official role usually occupied by the leader of the second largest party or coalition in the Australian Capital Territory Legislative Assembly.

== Structure ==
The title is conferred under Standing Order 5A of the ACT Legislative Assembly, that the leader of the opposition shall be the leader of the largest non-Government party, with the consent of that member. In the event of an equal number of members of the second largest party, the Assembly shall vote and elect a leader of the opposition.

Prior to 1991, the Opposition Leader was elected by a simple majority of the assembly with the government abstaining. However this was changed to be automatically the largest non-government party following the six and a half hour Duby Opposition Leadership.

The Leader of the Opposition receives a bonus salary of $132,158 on top of the $188,798 base salary already received by every member of the Legislative Assembly. Given the Opposition Leader must be an MLA, their total salary amounts to $320,956.

== History ==
The office of Opposition Leader has been primarily held by the leader of the ACT Branch of the Liberal Party. The party has held it consecutively through the last 24 years and 9 officeholders.

It has, however been held by the ACT Branch of the Labor Party on a number of occasions. Firstly during the brief Kaine government, and then again for a longer period of six years through the Carnell and Humphries governments.

The office has been held only once by a non-major party, that being Craig Duby of the Independents Group who stylised himself as "Coordinator of Non-Government Business". On 21 June 1991, Trevor Kaine resigned from the position to allow his party leader successor Gary Humphries to take the position on. As the Liberals did not have a majority of the non-government seats, they were susceptible to a challenge by another group for the position. That challenge came from Duby who was elected and served for six and a half hours before the Labor and Liberal combined majority changed the standing orders.

== List of opposition leaders of the Australian Capital Territory ==
No.	Portrait	Name	Election	Party	Term		Duration	Chief Minister
1		Trevor Kaine	1989	Liberal	11 May 1989	5 December 1989	208 days	Rosemary Follett; 1989
2		Rosemary Follett	—	Labor	5 December 1989	6 June 1991	1 year, 183 days	Trevor Kaine; 1989—1991
(1)		Trevor Kaine	—	Liberal	6 June 1991	21 June 1991	15 days	Rosemary Follett; 1991—1995
3		Craig Duby	—	Independents Group	21 June 1991		6.5 hours	Rosemary Follett; 1991—1995
4		Gary Humphries	—	Liberal	21 June 1991	22 July 1991	31 days	Rosemary Follett; 1991—1995
(1)		Trevor Kaine	1992	Liberal	22 July 1991	21 April 1993	1 year, 273 days	Rosemary Follett; 1991—1995
5		Kate Carnell	1995	Liberal	21 April 1993	9 March 1995	1 year, 322 days	Rosemary Follett; 1991—1995
(2)		Rosemary Follett	—	Labor	9 March 1995	5 March 1996	362 days	Kate Carnell; 1995—2000
6		Andrew Whitecross	—	Labor	5 March 1996	19 August 1997	1 year, 167 days	Kate Carnell; 1995—2000
7		Wayne Berry	1998	Labor	19 August 1997	20 February 1998	185 days	Kate Carnell; 1995—2000
8		Jon Stanhope	—	Labor	19 March 1998	19 October 2001	3 years, 265 days	Kate Carnell; 1995—2000
8		Jon Stanhope	2001	Labor	19 March 1998	19 October 2001	3 years, 265 days	Gary Humphries; 2000—2001
(4)		Gary Humphries	—	Liberal	12 November 2001	25 November 2002	1 year, 13 days	Jon Stanhope; 2001—2011
9		Brendan Smyth	2004	Liberal	25 November 2002	16 May 2006	3 years, 172 days	Jon Stanhope; 2001—2011
10		Bill Stefaniak	—	Liberal	16 May 2006	13 December 2007	1 year, 211 days	Jon Stanhope; 2001—2011
11		Zed Seselja	2008	Liberal	13 December 2007	11 January 2013	5 years, 60 days	Jon Stanhope; 2001—2011
11		Zed Seselja	2012	Liberal	13 December 2007	11 January 2013	5 years, 60 days	Katy Gallagher; 2011—2014
12		Jeremy Hanson	—	Liberal	11 February 2013	25 October 2016	3 years, 257 days	Katy Gallagher; 2011—2014
12		Jeremy Hanson	2016	Liberal	11 February 2013	25 October 2016	3 years, 257 days	Andrew Barr; 2014—
13		Alistair Coe	2020	Liberal	25 October 2016	27 October 2020	4 years, 2 days	Andrew Barr; 2014—
14		Elizabeth Lee	2024	Liberal	27 October 2020	31 October 2024	4 years, 4 days	Andrew Barr; 2014—
15		Leanne Castley	—	Liberal	31 October 2024	10 November 2025	1 year, 8 days	Andrew Barr; 2014—
16		Mark Parton	—	Liberal	10 November 2025	Incumbent	301 days	Andrew Barr; 2014—
