= Jeremy Hanson =

Australian politician

Jeremy Hanson CSC MLA
- Hanson in 2016

Speaker of the Australian Capital Territory Legislative Assembly
- Incumbent
- Assumed office 2 December 2025
- Deputy: Andrew Braddock
- Preceded by: Mark Parton; Andrew Braddock (acting)

Member of the ACT Legislative Assembly for Murrumbidgee
- Incumbent
- Assumed office 15 October 2016
- Preceded by: Constituency established

Leader of the Opposition of the Australian Capital Territory
- In office 11 February 2013 – 15 October 2016
- Deputy: Alistair Coe
- Preceded by: Zed Seselja
- Succeeded by: Alistair Coe

Leader of the Liberals in the ACT
- In office 11 February 2013 – 25 October 2016
- Deputy: Alistair Coe
- Preceded by: Zed Seselja
- Succeeded by: Alistair Coe

Member of the ACT Legislative Assembly for Molonglo
- In office 18 October 2008 – 15 October 2016
- Succeeded by: Constituency abolished

Deputy Leader of the Opposition
- In office February 2022 – 7 December 2023
- Preceded by: Giulia Jones
- Succeeded by: Leanne Castley
- In office 31 October 2024 – 10 November 2025
- Leader: Leanne Castley
- Preceded by: Leanne Castley
- Succeeded by: Deborah Morris

Deputy Leader of the Canberra Liberals
- In office February 2022 – 7 December 2023
- Preceded by: Giulia Jones
- Succeeded by: Leanne Castley
- In office 31 October 2024 – 10 November 2025
- Leader: Leanne Castley
- Preceded by: Leanne Castley
- Succeeded by: Deborah Morris

Personal details
- Born: 18 February 1967 (age 59) United Kingdom
- Citizenship: Australian; British
- Party: Liberal Party
- Spouse: Fleur (née Hughes)
- Children: William, Robbie (m)
- Education: Royal Military College Duntroon; University of New England; University of Canberra
- Profession: Army officer

Military service
- Allegiance: Australia
- Branch/service: Australian Army
- Years of service: 1986–2008
- Rank: Lieutenant Colonel
- Battles/wars: East Timor; Iraq War
- Awards: Conspicuous Service Cross

Jeremy David Hanson CSC MLA (born 18 February 1967) is an Australian politician and former Australian Army officer who has served as Speaker since 2025 and a member for Murrumbidgee since 2016 in the Australian Capital Territory Legislative Assembly.

Hanson is a member of the Liberal Party, and was elected to the ACT Legislative Assembly as one of seven MLAs for the Molonglo electorate at the 2008 election. He was the Opposition Leader in the ACT, as well as Shadow Minister for Health, Police, Corrections and Indigenous Affairs, between February 2013 and October 2016. In 2016, following a redistricting of the ACT's electorates and an expansion in size of the Legislative Assembly, he was elected as one of five MLAs for the new electorate of Murrumbidgee.

Following the resignation of fellow Murrumbidgee Liberal MLA, Giulia Jones, Hanson was elected as Deputy Leader of the Canberra Liberals in February 2022. On 4 December 2023, Hanson was dumped as deputy leader and replaced by Leanne Castley.

He returned to the deputy leadership following the 2024 election under leader Leanne Castley, before they both resigned in 2025 and he was replaced by Deborah Morris.

== Military career ==
The son of a Royal Air Force officer who was posted to Canberra in 1979, Hanson completed his schooling in Queensland and joined the Australian Army in 1986; graduating from the Royal Military College Duntroon in 1987. He holds a bachelor's degree from the University of New England and a master's degree in Management and Defence Studies from the University of Canberra. Before his election, Hanson served for 22 years in the Army, reaching the rank of lieutenant colonel.

He was deployed to East Timor and Iraq, and earned the Conspicuous Service Cross for his work at Army headquarters. In addition, Hanson has been awarded the following medals:

- ADF Gold Commendation
- Australian Active Service Medal – with clasps Iraq 2003 and East Timor
- Iraq Medal
- Defence Long Service Medal – with 1st clasp
- Defence Medal
- United Nations Medal – with UNTAET Ribbon
- Timor Leste Solidarity Medal
- Return from Active Service Badge
- Army Combat Badge

== Political views ==
Hanson has been described as having conservative views, and is a member of the Right faction of the Liberal Party. Hanson has been considered a major figure in modern conservatism in Canberra, along with former party president John Cziesla and former party leader and former Senator Zed Seselja. have claimed that Hanson's ousting as the Canberra Liberals' deputy leader was influenced by a growing rejection of social conservatism and right-wing populism in the party in favour of a more Moderate approach.

Despite being aligned with the party's conservative wing, Hanson supports same-sex marriage.

Hanson opposed the Indigenous Voice to Parliament proposal and endorsed the No campaign in the 2023 referendum on the matter.

== Personal life ==
Hanson is married to Fleur, and they live in Holder with sons William (from Hanson's first marriage) and Robbie. Hanson has dual British-Australian citizenship.

== See also ==
- 2016 Australian Capital Territory election

Australian Capital Territory Legislative Assembly
Preceded by	Member of the Legislative Assembly for Molonglo; 2008 – 2016	Electorate abolished
Preceded by Electorate created	Member of the Legislative Assembly for Murrumbidgee; 2016 – present	Incumbent
Political offices
Preceded by Zed Seselja	Leader of the Opposition of the Australian Capital Territory; 2013 – 2016	Succeeded by Alistair Coe
