= James Milligan (politician) =

Australian politician

James Milligan MLA
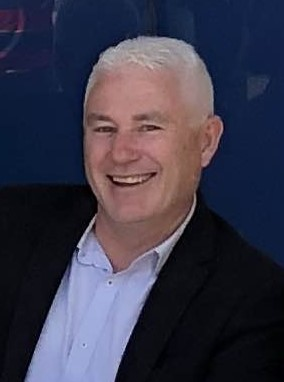
- Milligan in 2025

Member of the Australian Capital Territory Legislative Assembly for Yerrabi
- Incumbent
- Assumed office 25 March 2021
- Preceded by: Alistair Coe
- In office 15 October 2016 – 17 October 2020
- Preceded by: Electorate created
- Succeeded by: Leanne Castley

Personal details
- Born: 24 August 1978 (age 48)
- Party: Liberal Party

James Keith Milligan (born 24 August 1978) is an Australian politician. He is a Liberal member of the Australian Capital Territory Legislative Assembly from 2016 to 2020, representing the electorate of Yerrabi. He ran a graphic design publishing business before his election, and was communications director of the Gungahlin Community Council.

Milligan was defeated at the 2020 ACT election, losing his seat to fellow Liberal Leanne Castley, however he was re-elected in March 2021 in a countback of votes to fill a casual vacancy caused by the resignation of former Liberal leader Alistair Coe.
