= Deborah Morris (politician) =

Australian politician

Deborah Morris MLA

Member of the Australian Capital Territory Legislative Assembly for Brindabella
- Incumbent
- Assumed office 19 October 2024
- Preceded by: Nicole Lawder

Deputy Leader of the Opposition in the Australian Capital Territory
- Incumbent
- Assumed office 10 November 2025
- Leader: Mark Parton
- Preceded by: Jeremy Hanson

Personal details
- Party: Liberal Party
- Occupation: Politician

Deborah Helen Morris is an Australian politician who is the Deputy Leader of the Opposition in the Australian Capital Territory and has served as one of two Liberal members for the Brindabella electorate in the ACT Legislative Assembly since the 2024 ACT election, where she won the seat of retiring MLA Nicole Lawder with 9.9% of the primary vote (or 0.6 of a quota). Prior to becoming deputy leader, Morris was the Shadow Minister for Police, Emergency Services, and Community Safety, the Shadow Minister for Corrections, and the Shadow Minister for Prevention of Family and Domestic Violence. According to her candidate statement, Morris was a journalist and government advisor prior to her election.
