= Peter Cain (politician) =

Australian politician (born 1954)

Peter Cain MLA
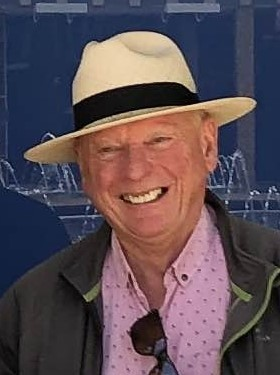
- Cain in 2025

Member of the Australian Capital Territory Legislative Assembly for Ginninderra
- Incumbent
- Assumed office 17 October 2020

Personal details
- Born: Peter John Cain; 10 November 1954 (age 71) Kurri Kurri, New South Wales, Australia
- Party: Canberra Liberals
- Spouse: Claire Cain
- Children: 7
- Education: University of Newcastle; University of Canberra; Australian National University
- Occupation: Teacher, Lawyer, Politician

Peter John Cain (born 10 November 1954) is an Australian politician who was elected to the seat of Ginninderra in the Australian Capital Territory Legislative Assembly in 2020, representing the Canberra Liberals.

== Early life and education ==
Cain was born in Kurri Kurri, New South Wales, and attended local primary and secondary schools. He graduated from the University of Newcastle with a bachelor's degree in Mathematics (Hons) in 1976, and a Diploma of Education in 1977.

Cain's early career was in teaching in NSW, South Australia and the ACT. He returned to study at the University of Canberra obtaining a Bachelor of Laws (Hons) in 2001, followed by a Graduate Diploma of Legal Practice at the Australian National University in 2002.

Following graduation, Cain worked in the ACT Government in the Revenue Management Branch of Treasury, where his most senior role was managing the tax disputes section, Objection and Appeals.

He served as Vice President of the ACT Law Society from September 2017 to September 2020.

== Political career ==
Cain was pre-selected for the Canberra Liberals' ticket for Ginninderra in December 2019. In October 2020, Cain was elected as a Member of the Legislative Assembly. Cain was appointed the following shadow portfolios; Attorney-General, Planning and Land Management, Multicultural Affairs and Assistant Treasurer. Cain's former portfolios were Regulatory Services and Jobs and Workplace Affairs, that were redistributed to other Liberal MLAs in the mid-2022 reshuffle. Cain is also an Assistant Speaker of the Legislative Assembly.

On 19 June 2025, Cain announced he would resign from his positions as Shadow Attorney-General and Shadow Planning and Housing Services Minister and move to the Liberals' backbench saying that he could no longer support the party's leadership team.

On 28 October 2025, Cain was suspended from the Liberal party due to his decision to cross the floor and vote for a longer parliamentary sitting calendar.

== Personal life ==
Cain is married to Claire with seven children, and lives in Belconnen. He is a practicing Catholic and a vegetarian.
