= Moderates (Liberal Party of Australia) =

Political faction

Moderate Faction Moderates, Modern Liberals, Small-l liberals
- Ideology: Social liberalism; Cultural liberalism; Economic liberalism
- Political position: Centre to centre-right
- House of Representatives: 7 / 27 (2025 seats)
- Senate: 9 / 23 (2025 seats)

The Moderates, (Note: also known as Modern Liberals, Small-L Liberals Liberal Left, The Mods, social liberals, and wets,) are a faction comprising the members, supporters and voters of the Liberal Party of Australia who are typically economically, socially and environmentally liberal. Described as centrist, the faction has supported ideologies such as economic liberalism, centrism and cultural liberalism, having a combination of economically liberal and socially progressive views. From May 2025 to February 2026, the offices of Leader of the Liberal Party and Leader of the Opposition were occupied by Sussan Ley, a member of the Moderates who was the first woman to hold either position.

They compete with the Liberal Party's currently larger and controlling faction, the National Right.

== Geographical base ==
Moderate Liberals traditionally represent inner-city and wealthy House of Representatives seats or are in the Senate.

== Membership ==
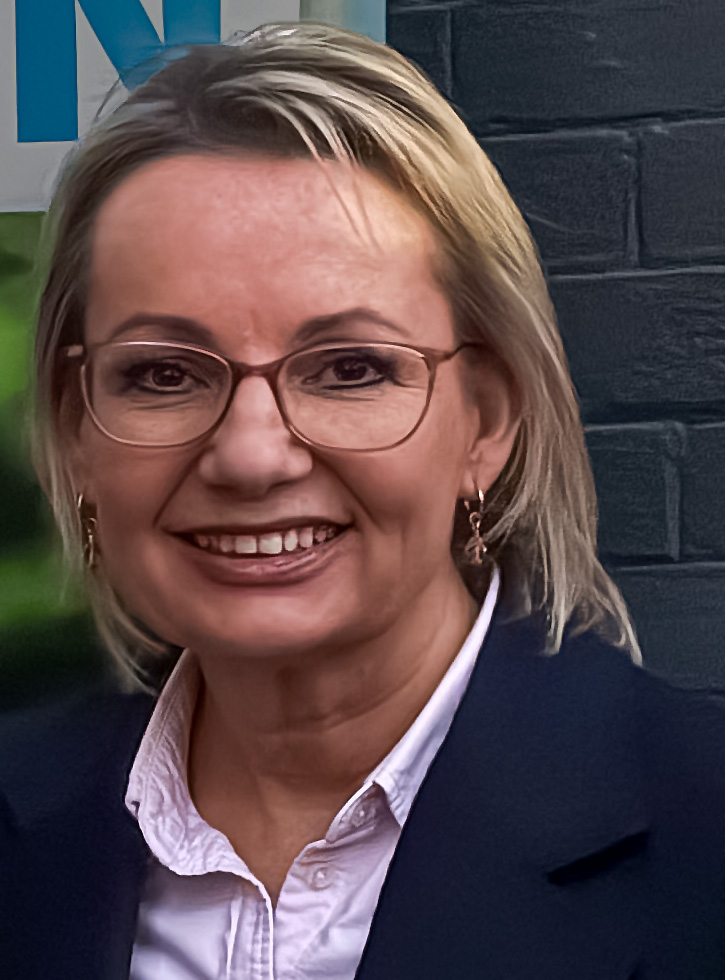
Ley in 2025

Prominent moderates include former Prime Minister Malcolm Turnbull, former Foreign Affairs Minister and former Deputy Leader Julie Bishop, former Defence Minister Christopher Pyne, former Attorney-General George Brandis, and former Liberal-turned-independent MP Julia Banks.

Prominent moderates in the Morrison government included Senate leader Simon Birmingham, Marise Payne, Paul Fletcher and Linda Reynolds.

At the state level, four Liberal leaders are from this faction: Kellie Sloane (the New South Wales Opposition Leader), Jeremy Rockliff (the current Tasmanian Premier), Jess Wilson (the Victorian Opposition Leader), and Ashton Hurn (the South Australia Opposition Leader). Prominent Moderates in New South Wales include Gladys Berejiklian (the 45th Premier of New South Wales), Matt Kean (the faction's leader in New South Wales and former deputy leader of the party), Chris Rath (Opposition Whip in the Legislative Council, Shadow Minister, and powerbroker), Michael Photios (Former Minister and powerbroker), Rob Stokes (a former Cabinet minister), and Natalie Ward (the party's deputy leader in New South Wales). Prominent Moderates in other states include Georgie Crozier and David Southwick in Victoria; John Gardner, Josh Teague (current South Australian Liberal deputy leader) and Tim Whetstone in South Australia; and Peter Gutwein and Will Hodgman in Tasmania (who both served as Premier).

=== Current Federal Members ===
As of 18 March 2026.

Name	Constituency	Current Shadow/Former Government Positions	State/Territory
Ted O'Brien	Member for Fairfax	Former Deputy Leader of the Opposition and Shadow Treasurer	QLD
Maria Kovacic	Senator for NSW	Shadow Assistant Minister	NSW
Anne Ruston	Senator for SA	Deputy Leader of Opposition in Senate, Manager of Opposition Business in Senate, Shadow Minister for Health, NDIS and Sport Former Minister for Families and Social Services.	SA
Jane Hume	Senator for VIC	Former Minister for Superannuation, Financial Services and the Digital Economy, and Women's Economic Security portfolios.	VIC
Angie Bell	Member for Moncrief	Shadow Minister for Environment and Youth	QLD
Richard Colbeck	Senator for TAS		TAS
Andrew Bragg	Senator for NSW	Shadow Minister for Housing and Homelessness, and Productivity and Deregulation	NSW
Tim Wilson	Member for Goldstein	Shadow Minister for Small Business, and Industrial Relations and Employment	VIC
Paul Scarr	Senator for QLD	Shadow Minister for Immigration and Citizenship and Multicultural Affairs	QLD
Mary Aldred	Member for Monash		VIC
James McGrath	Senator for QLD	Shadow Minister for Urban Infrastructure and Cities, Brisbane 2032 Olympics, and Shadow Special Minister of State Deputy Manager of Opposition Business in the Senate	QLD
Dave Sharma	Senator for NSW	Shadow Assistant Minister	NSW
Melissa Price	Member for Durack	Shadow Minister for Defence Industry and Defence Personnel Former Minister for Environment	WA
Julian Leeser	Member for Berowra	Shadow Minister for Arts and Attorney General	NSW
Kerrynne Liddle	Senator for SA	Shadow Minister for Social Services and Indigenous Australians	SA

=== Former Federal Members ===
- John Alexander
- Katie Allen
- Bridget Archer
- Julia Banks (2016–2018) (Note: Julia Banks left the Liberal Party in 2018 while sitting as a federal MP.)
- Julie Bishop
- David Coleman
- Warren Entsch
- Trevor Evans
- Jason Falinski
- Paul Fletcher
- Joe Hockey
- Fiona Martin
- Christopher Pyne
- Malcolm Turnbull
- Jenny Ware
- Ken Wyatt
- Trent Zimmerman
- Simon Birmingham
- George Brandis
- Marise Payne

== See also ==
- Teal independents
- National Right
- One Nation Conservatives
- Blue Grit
- Red Tory
- Blue Dog Coalition
- New Democrat Coalition
- Republican Governance Group
- Labor Right
- Labor Left
