= Ginninderra electorate =

Ginninderra Australian Capital Territory—Legislative Assembly
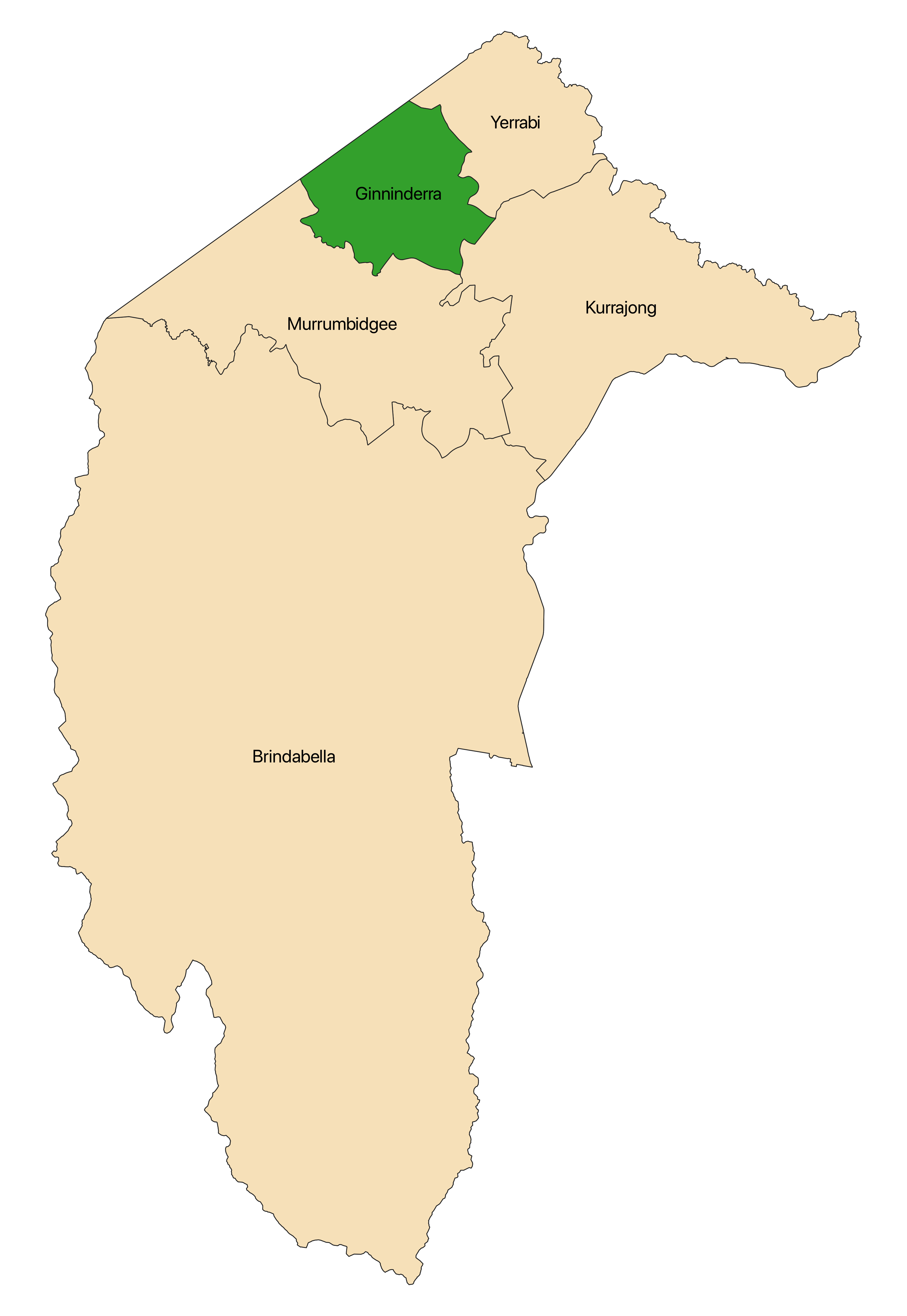
- Territory: Australian Capital Territory
- Created: 1995
- Electors: 63,188 (2020)
- Area: 105 km^{2} (40.5 sq mi)
- Federal electorate: Fenner
- Coordinates: 35°13′41″S 149°2′17″E
Electorates around Ginninderra:
Goulburn (NSW)	Yerrabi	Yerrabi
Murrumbidgee	Ginninderra	Kurrajong
Murrumbidgee	Murrumbidgee	Kurrajong

The Ginninderra electorate is one of the five electorates for the unicameral 25-member Australian Capital Territory Legislative Assembly. It elects five members.

== History ==
It was created in 1995, when the three-electorate, Hare-Clark electoral system was first introduced for the Australian Capital Territory (ACT). Prior to 1995, a multi-member single constituency existed for the whole of the ACT. The name "Ginninderra" is derived from an Aboriginal word meaning "sparkling like the stars". It is the name given to the creek that flows through the middle of Belconnen, which was dammed to form Lake Ginninderra, the lake on which the Belconnen Town Centre is sited.

== Location ==
The Ginninderra electorate comprises the southern part of the district of Belconnen, including the suburbs of Aranda, Belconnen, Bruce, Charnwood, Cook, Dunlop, Evatt, Florey, Flynn, Fraser, Hawker, Higgins, Holt, Latham, Lawson, Macgregor, Macnamara, Macquarie, Melba, McKellar, Page, Scullin, Spence, Strathnairn and Weetangera.

Two Belconnen suburbs, Giralang and Kaleen are part of Yerrabi.

From 1995 to 2001 it contained the Canberra districts of Belconnen and Hall. After the 2001 redistribution the Gungahlin suburb of Nicholls was moved to the electorate. The 2008 redistribution made no changes to the boundaries of the electorate.

In the 2012 redistribution the Gungahlin suburbs of Crace and Palmerston were moved from Molonglo into Ginninderra.

In the 2016 redistribution, all three Gungahlin suburbs, the village of Hall, and the Belconnen suburbs of Evatt, Giralang, Kaleen, Lawson and McKellar were transferred into the new Yerrabi electorate. At the 2020 redistribution, the suburbs of Evatt, Lawson and McKellar were transferred back into Ginninderra.

== Members ==
Year	Member	Party	Member	Party	Member	Party	Member	Party	Member	Party
1995	Roberta McRae	Labor	Wayne Berry	Labor	Lucy Horodny	Greens	Harold Hird	Liberal	Bill Stefaniak	Liberal
1998	Jon Stanhope	Labor	Wayne Berry	Labor	Dave Rugendyke	Independent	Harold Hird	Liberal	Bill Stefaniak	Liberal
2001	Jon Stanhope	Labor	Wayne Berry	Labor	Roslyn Dundas	Democrats	Vicki Dunne	Liberal	Bill Stefaniak	Liberal
2004	Jon Stanhope	Labor	Wayne Berry	Labor	Mary Porter	Labor	Vicki Dunne	Liberal	Bill Stefaniak	Liberal
2008	Jon Stanhope	Labor	Meredith Hunter	Greens	Mary Porter	Labor	Vicki Dunne	Liberal	Alistair Coe	Liberal
2011^{1}	Chris Bourke	Labor	Meredith Hunter	Greens	Mary Porter	Labor	Vicki Dunne	Liberal	Alistair Coe	Liberal
2012	Chris Bourke	Labor	Yvette Berry	Labor	Mary Porter	Labor	Vicki Dunne	Liberal	Alistair Coe	Liberal
2016^{2}	Chris Bourke	Labor	Yvette Berry	Labor	Jayson Hinder	Labor	Vicki Dunne	Liberal	Alistair Coe	Liberal
2016	Tara Cheyne	Labor	Yvette Berry	Labor	Gordon Ramsay	Labor	Vicki Dunne	Liberal	Elizabeth Kikkert	Liberal
2020	Tara Cheyne	Labor	Yvette Berry	Labor	Jo Clay	Greens	Peter Cain	Liberal	Elizabeth Kikkert	Liberal
2024^{3}	Tara Cheyne	Labor	Yvette Berry	Labor	Jo Clay	Greens	Peter Cain	Liberal	Elizabeth Kikkert	Independent
2024^{3}	Tara Cheyne	Labor	Yvette Berry	Labor	Jo Clay	Greens	Peter Cain	Liberal	Elizabeth Kikkert	Family First
2024	Tara Cheyne	Labor	Yvette Berry	Labor	Jo Clay	Greens	Peter Cain	Liberal	Chiaka Barry	Liberal

^{1} Jon Stanhope (Labor) resigned from the Assembly on 16 May 2011. Chris Bourke (Labor) was elected as his replacement on a countback on 30 May 2011.
^{2} Mary Porter (Labor) resigned from the Assembly on 19 February 2016. Jayson Hinder (Labor) was elected as her replacement on a countback on 7 March 2016.
^{3} Elizabeth Kikkert was expelled from the Canberra Liberals party room on 10 September 2024 after being disendorsed as a candidate for the 2024 election. She subsequently joined the Family First Party on 24 September 2024.

== Election results ==
2024 Australian Capital Territory election: Ginninderra
Party	Candidate	Votes	%	±%
Quota		9,343		
Labor	Tara Cheyne (elected 1)	7,813	13.9	+2.6
Labor	Yvette Berry (elected 2)	7,727	13.8	−1.8
Labor	Heidi Prowse	2,190	3.9	+3.9
Labor	Tim Bavinton	2,095	3.7	+3.7
Labor	Sean Sadimoen	1,001	1.8	+1.8
Liberal	Peter Cain (elected 3)	5,782	10.3	+4.8
Liberal	Chiaka Barry (elected 5)	3,601	6.4	+6.4
Liberal	Joe Prevedello	2,894	5.2	+5.2
Liberal	Darren Roberts	2,494	4.4	+4.4
Greens	Jo Clay (elected 4)	3,426	6.1	−0.1
Greens	Adele Sinclair	2,090	3.7	+3.7
Greens	Dani Hunter	1,238	2.2	+2.2
Greens	Tim Liersch	1,126	2.0	−0.3
Independents for Canberra	Mark Richardson	2,116	3.8	+3.8
Independents for Canberra	Leanne Foresti	1,443	2.6	+2.6
Independents for Canberra	Suzanne Nucifora	670	1.2	+1.2
Belco	Bill Stefaniak	1,527	2.7	−1.3
Belco	Alan Tutt	696	1.2	+0.1
Belco	Angela Lount	397	0.7	−0.2
Family First	Elizabeth Kikkert	1,926	3.4	−5.9
Family First	Andrew Wallace	445	0.8	+0.8
Family First	Sunil Baby	223	0.4	+0.4
Animal Justice	Lara Drew	514	0.9	−0.1
Animal Justice	Carolyne Drew	443	0.8	+0.1
Democratic Labour	Helen Crowe	223	0.4	+0.4
Democratic Labour	Maxwell Spencer	152	0.3	+0.3
Democratic Labour	John Vandenburgh	149	0.3	+0.3
Democratic Labour	Douglas Cooper	146	0.3	+0.3
Democratic Labour	Rick Howard	129	0.2	+0.2
Independent	Janine Haskins	643	1.1	+1.1
Libertarian	Guy Jakeman	221	0.4	−0.1
Libertarian	Arved von Brasch	178	0.3	+0.3
Independent	Mignonne Cullen	324	0.6	−0.7
Total formal votes		56,052	98.0	−0.5
Informal votes		1,156	2.0	+0.5
Turnout		57,208	86.9	−2.2
Party total votes
Labor		20,826	37.2	−2.8
Liberal		14,771	26.4	−0.4
Greens		7,880	14.1	+1.6
Independents for Canberra		4,229	7.5	+7.5
Belco		2,620	4.7	−4.7
Family First		2,594	4.6	+4.6
Animal Justice		957	1.7	−0.0
Democratic Labour		809	1.4	−1.0
Independent	Janine Haskins	643	1.1	+1.1
Libertarian		399	0.7	−0.1
Independent	Mignonne Cullen	324	0.6	−0.7
Labor hold		Swing	+2.6	
Labor hold		Swing	−1.8	
Liberal hold		Swing	+4.8	
Liberal hold		Swing	+6.4	
Greens hold		Swing	−0.1	

== See also ==
- Australian Capital Territory Electoral Commission
- Australian Capital Territory Legislative Assembly
