= Results of the 2001 Australian Capital Territory election =

This is a list of Legislative Assembly results for the 2001 Australian Capital Territory election.

== Results summary ==
Australian Capital Territory election, 20 October 2001 Legislative Assembly << 1998–2004 >>
Enrolled voters	218,615				
Votes cast	198,721		Turnout	90.9%	-0.9
Informal votes	7,881		Informal	4.0%	-0.4
Summary of votes by party
Party	Primary votes	%	Swing	Seats	Change
Labor	79,616	41.7	+14.1	8	+2
Liberal	60,390	31.6	-6.2	7	±0
Greens	17,369	9.1	-0.0	1	±0
Democrats	15,338	8.0	+2.1	1	+1
Paul Osborne	3,888	2.0	-7.1	0	-2
Independent	3,838	2.0	-3.1	0	±0
Dave Rugendyke	3,126	1.6	+1.6	0	±0
Nurses Good Government Party	2,763	1.5	+1.5	0	±0
Liberal Democrats	1,873	1.0	+1.0	0	±0
Gungahlin Equality Party	1,090	0.6	+0.6	0	±0
United Canberra Party	880	0.5	+0.5	0	±0
Canberra First Party	669	0.4	+0.4	0	±0
Total	190,840			17	

== Results by electorate ==
=== Brindabella ===
2001 Australian Capital Territory election: Brindabella
Party	Candidate	Votes	%	±%
Quota		9,435		
Labor	John Hargreaves (elected 2)	8,609	15.21	+9.22
Labor	Bill Wood (elected 3)	6,828	12.06	+2.90
Labor	Karin MacDonald (elected 5)	4,074	7.20	+7.20
Labor	Trevor Santi	3,039	5.37	+5.37
Labor	Athol Williams	2,341	4.14	+4.14
Liberal	Brendan Smyth (elected 1)	8,926	15.77	−0.74
Liberal	Steve Pratt (elected 4)	3,981	7.03	+7.03
Liberal	Steve Doszpot	1,988	3.51	+3.51
Liberal	Megan O'Connor	1,890	3.34	+3.34
Liberal	Winnifred Rosser	1,250	2.21	+2.21
Democrats	Jeannette Jolley	1,754	3.10	+3.10
Democrats	Domenic Mico	1,369	2.42	+2.42
Democrats	Mike Welch	815	1.44	+1.44
Paul Osborne	Paul Osborne	3,732	6.59	−9.36
Paul Osborne	Donna Bush	156	0.28	+0.28
Greens	Kathryn Kelly	1,784	3.15	+3.15
Greens	Sue Ellerman	1,290	2.28	+0.25
Nurses	Maria Trudinger	950	1.68	+1.68
Kaine Independent Group	Trevor Kaine	524	0.93	−5.38
Kaine Independent Group	Sandie Brooke	112	0.20	+0.20
Independent	Bruce Sutherland	455	0.80	+0.80
Liberal Democrats	Darren Kennedy	153	0.27	+0.27
Liberal Democrats	Bradley Brown	144	0.25	+0.25
Independent	Len Munday	252	0.45	+0.45
Group F	May Levantis	71	0.13	+0.13
Group F	Bob Mackenzie	57	0.10	+0.10
Independent	Danny Alameddine	60	0.11	+0.11
Total formal votes		56,604	95.59	−0.06
Informal votes		2,612	4.41	+0.06
Turnout		59,216	92.50	−0.42
Party total votes
Labor		24,891	43.97	+15.47
Liberal		18,035	31.86	−5.21
Democrats		3,938	6.96	+0.81
Paul Osborne		3,888	6.87	−9.36
Greens		3,074	5.43	−2.65
Nurses		950	1.68	+1.68
Kaine Independent Group		636	1.12	+1.12
Independent	Bruce Sutherland	455	0.80	+0.80
Liberal Democrats		297	0.52	+0.52
Independent	Len Munday	252	0.45	+0.45
Group F		128	0.23	+0.23
Independent	Danny Alameddine	60	0.11	+0.11
Labor hold		Swing	+9.22	
Labor hold		Swing	+2.90	
Labor gain from Independent		Swing	+7.20	
Liberal hold		Swing	−0.74	
Liberal hold		Swing	+7.03	

=== Ginninderra ===
2001 Australian Capital Territory election: Ginninderra
Party	Candidate	Votes	%	±%
Quota		9,285		
Labor	Jon Stanhope (elected 1)	13,640	24.48	+16.43
Labor	Wayne Berry (elected 3)	3,973	7.13	−5.43
Labor	Susan McCarthy	2,617	4.70	+4.70
Labor	Vic Rebikoff	1,868	3.35	+3.35
Labor	Judith Downey	1,754	3.15	+3.15
Liberal	Bill Stefaniak (elected 2)	7,569	13.59	−2.11
Liberal	Harold Hird	2,443	4.39	−2.20
Liberal	Ilona Fraser	2,111	3.79	+3.79
Liberal	Vicki Dunne (elected 5)	2,013	3.61	−1.77
Liberal	Andrew Sarri	1,416	2.54	+2.54
Democrats	Roslyn Dundas (elected 4)	2,198	3.95	+3.95
Democrats	Dan McMillan	2,198	3.65	+3.65
Democrats	Anthony David	1,175	2.11	+2.11
Greens	Shane Rattenbury	3,045	5.47	+1.71
Greens	Patricia Woodcroft-Lee	1,381	2.48	+2.48
Dave Rugendyke	Dave Rugendyke	2,990	5.37	−2.50
Dave Rugendyke	Ian Brown	136	0.24	+0.24
Liberal Democrats	John Humphreys	775	1.39	+1.39
Liberal Democrats	Susan Morrissey	270	0.48	+0.48
Nurses	Rhonda James	704	1.26	+1.26
Independent	Chris Garvie	620	1.10	+1.10
Group F	Darcy Henry	356	0.64	+0.64
Group F	Geoff Clarke	113	0.20	+0.20
Gungahlin Equality Party	John Simsons	175	0.31	+0.31
Gungahlin Equality Party	Gail Jones	171	0.31	+0.31
Independent	Shaun Good	160	0.29	+0.29
Total formal votes		55,708	96.01	+0.65
Informal votes		2,314	3.99	−0.65
Turnout		58,022	91.71	−1.12
Party total votes
Labor		23,852	42.82	+13.21
Liberal		15,552	27.92	−5.27
Democrats		5,408	9.71	+2.54
Greens		4,426	7.94	−0.75
Dave Rugendyke		3,126	5.61	−4.02
Liberal Democrats		1,045	1.88	+1.88
Nurses		704	1.26	+1.26
Independent	Chris Garvie	620	1.10	+1.10
Group F		469	0.84	+0.84
Gungahlin Equality Party		346	0.62	+0.62
Independent	Shaun Good	160	0.29	+0.29
Labor hold		Swing	+16.43	
Labor hold		Swing	−5.43	
Liberal hold		Swing	−2.11	
Liberal hold		Swing	−1.77	
Democrats gain from Independent		Swing	+3.95	

=== Molonglo ===
2001 Australian Capital Territory election: Molonglo
Party	Candidate	Votes	%	±%
Quota		9,817		
Labor	Simon Corbell (elected 3)	8,322	10.60	+5.95
Labor	Ted Quinlan (elected 4)	7,331	9.34	+5.38
Labor	Katy Gallagher (elected 5)	3,443	4.38	+4.38
Labor	John O'Keefe	3,305	4.21	+0.82
Labor	Christina Ryan	3,202	4.08	+4.08
Labor	Marion Reilly	2,942	3.75	−0.18
Labor	Fred Leftwich	2,328	2.96	+2.96
Liberal	Gary Humphries (elected 1)	15,856	20.19	+17.67
Liberal	Manuel Xyrakis	2,411	3.07	+3.07
Liberal	Helen Cross (elected 6)	2,352	3.00	+3.00
Liberal	Jacqui Burke	1,764	2.25	+1.29
Liberal	Greg Cornwell (elected 7)	1,616	2.06	+0.41
Liberal	Amalia Matheson	1,506	1.92	+1.92
Liberal	Mark Spill	1,298	1.65	+1.65
Greens	Kerrie Tucker (elected 2)	7,906	10.07	+3.92
Greens	Victoria Young	716	0.91	+0.91
Greens	Deb Foskey	658	0.84	+0.84
Greens	Michael Nolan	589	0.75	+0.75
Democrats	Jane Errey	2,230	2.84	+0.94
Democrats	Stella Jones	1,437	1.83	+1.83
Democrats	Isabel Walters	1,352	1.72	+1.72
Democrats	Eric Bray	973	1.24	+1.24
Nurses		765	0.97	+0.97
Nurses	Phillip Hickox	344	0.44	+0.44
Group I	Hilary Back	813	1.04	−0.71
Group I	Melanie Marshall	119	0.15	+0.15
Gungahlin Equality Party	Ian Ruecroft	382	0.49	+0.49
Gungahlin Equality Party	Jonathon Reynolds	362	0.46	+0.46
Canberra First Party	Lucinda Spier	314	0.40	+0.40
Canberra First Party	Nancy Louise McCullough	146	0.19	+0.19
Canberra First Party	Joel Pasternak	105	0.13	+0.13
Canberra First Party	Claire James	104	0.13	+0.13
Liberal Democrats	Duncan Spender	212	0.27	+0.27
Liberal Democrats	Brett Graham	169	0.22	+0.22
Liberal Democrats	John Purnell-Webb	150	0.19	+0.19
Independent	Ian Black	424	0.54	+0.54
Group G	Pamela Ayson	193	0.25	+0.25
Group G	Tania Gelonesi	91	0.12	+0.12
Kaine Independent Group	Alan Parker	129	0.16	+0.16
Kaine Independent Group	Colin Cartwright	115	0.15	+0.15
Independent	Marnie Black	54	0.07	+0.07
Total formal votes		78,528	96.37	+0.44
Informal votes		2,955	3.63	−0.44
Turnout		81,483	89.22	−1.20
Party total votes
Labor		30,873	39.31	+13.67
Liberal		26,803	34.13	−7.33
Greens		9,869	12.57	+2.46
Democrats		5,992	7.63	+2.56
Nurses	Robyn Staniforth	1,109	1.41	+1.41
Group I		932	1.19	+1.19
Gungahlin Equality Party		744	0.95	+0.95
Canberra First Party		669	0.85	+0.85
Liberal Democrats		531	0.68	+0.68
Independent	Ian Black	424	0.54	+0.54
Group G		284	0.36	+0.36
Kaine Independent Group		244	0.31	+0.31
Independent	Marnie Black	54	0.07	+0.07
Labor hold		Swing	+5.95	
Labor hold		Swing	+5.38	
Labor gain from Independent		Swing	+4.38	
Liberal hold		Swing	+17.67	
Liberal hold		Swing	+3.00	
Liberal hold		Swing	+0.41	
Greens hold		Swing	+3.92	

== See also ==
- List of Australian Capital Territory elections
