= Results of the 1998 Australian Capital Territory election =

This is a list of Legislative Assembly results for the 1998 Australian Capital Territory election.

== Results summary ==
Australian Capital Territory election, 21 February 1998 Legislative Assembly << 1995–2001 >>
Enrolled voters	205,248				
Votes cast	188,484		Turnout	91.8%	+2.3
Informal votes	8,134		Informal	4.3%	-1.9
Summary of votes by party
Party	Primary votes	%	Swing	Seats	Change
Liberal	68,221	37.8	-2.7	7	±0
Labor	49,798	27.6	-4.0	6	±0
Osborne Independent Group	16,426	9.1	+9.1	2	+2
Greens	16,417	9.1	+0.0	1	-1
Democrats	10,786	6.0	+2.1	0	±0
Independent	9,232	5.1	-0.5	0	-1
Moore Independents	5,261	2.9	-4.1	1	±0
Christian Democrats	3,027	1.7	+1.7	0	±0
Democratic Socialist	745	0.4	+0.4	0	±0
Progressive Labour	437	0.2	+0.2	0	±0
Total	180,350			17	

== Results by electorate ==
=== Brindabella ===
1998 Australian Capital Territory election: Brindabella
Party	Candidate	Votes	%	±%
Quota		9,042		
Liberal	Brendan Smyth (elected 1)	8,956	16.51	+16.51
Liberal	Louise Littlewood	3,918	7.22	+1.37
Liberal	Trevor Kaine (elected 4)	3,422	6.31	−2.61
Liberal	Geoff Didier	2,149	3.96	+3.96
Liberal	Margaret L. Head	1,665	3.07	+3.07
Labor	Bill Wood (elected 3)	4,971	9.16	+0.18
Labor	Andrew Whitecross	3,893	7.18	−4.17
Labor	John Hargreaves (elected 5)	3,252	5.99	+5.99
Labor	Karen Mow	1,775	3.27	+3.27
Labor	Kathryn Presdee	1,572	2.90	+2.90
Osborne Independent Group	Paul Osborne (elected 2)	8,273	15.25	+4.02
Osborne Independent Group	Linda Moore	531	0.98	+0.98
Greens	Fiona Tito	1,659	3.06	+3.06
Greens	Sue Ellerman	1,103	2.03	+2.03
Greens	Liz Stephens	888	1.64	−0.24
Greens	Peter Farrelly	733	1.64	+1.64
Democrats	Anna Grant	909	1.68	+1.68
Democrats	Charlie Bell	811	1.49	+0.18
Democrats	Adele Tait	579	1.07	+1.07
Democrats	Geoff Dodd	549	1.01	+1.01
Democrats	Mark Peirce	488	0.90	+0.90
Christian Democrats	Francis Piccin	547	1.01	+1.01
Christian Democrats	Stephen Carter	364	0.67	+0.67
Independent	Margaret A. Kobier	381	0.70	−0.75
Independent	Margot Marshall	261	0.48	+0.48
Independent	Peter Menegazzo	238	0.44	+0.44
Independent	Leonard Munday	230	0.42	+0.42
Independent	Tom Cornwell	134	0.25	+0.25
Total formal votes		54,251	95.65	+1.88
Informal votes		2,467	4.35	−1.88
Turnout		56,718	92.92	+1.69
Party total votes
Liberal		20,110	37.07	+0.01
Labor		15,463	28.50	−3.08
Osborne Independent Group		8,804	16.23	+5.00
Greens		4,383	8.08	+0.13
Democrats		3,336	6.15	+2.39
Christian Democrats		911	1.68	+1.68
Independent	Margaret A. Kobier	381	0.70	−0.75
Independent	Margot Marshall	261	0.48	+0.48
Independent	Peter Menegazzo	238	0.44	+0.44
Independent	Leonard Munday	230	0.42	+0.42
Independent	Tom Cornwell	134	0.25	+0.25
Liberal hold		Swing	+16.51	
Liberal hold		Swing	−2.61	
Labor hold		Swing	+0.18	
Labor hold		Swing	+5.99	
Osborne Independent Group hold		Swing	+4.02	

=== Ginninderra ===
1998 Australian Capital Territory election: Ginninderra
Party	Candidate	Votes	%	±%
Quota		8,406		
Liberal	Bill Stefaniak (elected 1)	7,918	15.70	−0.07
Liberal	Harold Hird (elected 3)	3,322	6.59	−0.77
Liberal	Vicki Dunne	2,714	5.38	+5.38
Liberal	Terry Birtles	1,724	3.42	+3.42
Liberal	Warwick Gow	1,063	2.11	+2.11
Labor	Wayne Berry (elected 2)	6,335	12.56	−3.54
Labor	Jon Stanhope (elected 4)	4,061	8.05	+8.05
Labor	Roberta McRae	2,136	4.24	−1.68
Labor	Joy Nicholls	1,221	2.42	+2.42
Labor	Chris Sant	1,178	2.34	+2.34
Osborne Independent Group	Dave Rugendyke (elected 5)	3,971	7.87	+7.87
Osborne Independent Group	Hilary Back	885	1.75	+1.75
Greens	Shane Rattenbury	1,896	3.76	+3.76
Greens	Jennifer Palma	904	1.79	+1.79
Greens	Dierk Von Behrens	839	1.66	+1.66
Greens	Molly Wainwright	745	1.48	+1.48
Democrats	Jocelyn Bell	1,600	3.17	+3.17
Democrats	Peter Vandenbroek	758	1.50	+1.50
Democrats	Terry Holder	457	0.91	+0.91
Democrats	Stephen Selden	401	0.80	+0.80
Democrats	Alex Allars	398	0.79	+0.79
Independent	Manuel Xyrakis	1,856	3.68	+3.68
Independent	Helen Szuty	1,227	2.43	+2.43
Independent	Alice Chu	1,089	2.16	+2.16
Christian Democrats	John Richard Miller	627	1.24	+1.24
Christian Democrats	Ivan Young	295	0.58	+0.58
Group G	Cheryl Hill	402	0.80	+0.80
Group G	Derek Hill	35	0.07	+0.07
Progressive Labour	Renee Brooks	138	0.27	+0.27
Progressive Labour	Morgan Graham	102	0.20	+0.20
Independent	Connie Steven	136	0.27	+0.27
Total formal votes		50,433	95.36	+2.08
Informal votes		2,454	4.64	−2.08
Turnout		52,887	92.83	+2.27
Party total votes
Liberal		16,741	33.19	−7.50
Labor		14,931	29.61	−3.13
Osborne Independent Group		4,856	9.63	+9.63
Greens		4,384	8.69	−0.02
Democrats		3,614	7.17	+2.12
Independent	Manuel Xyrakis	1,856	3.68	+3.68
Independent	Helen Szuty	1,227	2.43	+2.43
Independent	Alice Chu	1,089	2.16	+2.16
Christian Democrats		922	1.83	+1.83
Group G		437	0.87	+0.87
Progressive Labour		240	0.48	+0.48
Independent	Connie Steven	136	0.27	+0.27
Liberal hold		Swing	−0.07	
Liberal hold		Swing	−0.77	
Labor hold		Swing	−3.54	
Labor hold		Swing	+8.05	
Osborne Independent Group gain from Greens		Swing	+7.87	

=== Molonglo ===
1998 Australian Capital Territory election: Molonglo
Party	Candidate	Votes	%	±%
Quota		9,459		
Liberal	Kate Carnell (elected 1)	25,379	33.54	+4.79
Liberal	Gary Humphries (elected 2)	1,903	2.52	−2.04
Liberal	Greg Cornwell (elected 4)	1,248	1.65	−0.97
Liberal	Nick Tolley	851	1.12	+1.12
Liberal	Jacqui Burke	728	0.96	+0.96
Liberal	John Louttit	679	0.90	+0.90
Liberal	Greg Aouad	582	0.77	−0.76
Labor	Simon Corbell (elected 5)	3,515	4.65	+3.96
Labor	Ted Quinlan (elected 6)	3,000	3.96	+3.96
Labor	Marion Reilly	2,974	3.93	+3.03
Labor	Tania McMurtry	2,728	3.61	+3.61
Labor	Steve Garth	2,660	3.52	+3.52
Labor	John O'Keefe	2,565	3.39	+3.39
Labor	Chris Flaherty	1,962	2.59	+2.59
Greens	Kerrie Tucker (elected 3)	4,652	6.15	−0.16
Greens	Roland Manderson	720	0.95	+0.95
Greens	Caroline Le Couteur	566	0.75	+0.75
Greens	Niki Ruker	486	0.64	+0.64
Greens	Tiffany Lynch	483	0.64	+0.64
Greens	Miko Kirschbaum	373	0.49	+0.49
Greens	Michael Smitheram	370	0.49	+0.49
Moore Independents	Michael Moore (elected 7)	4,936	6.52	−0.53
Moore Independents	Joan Kellett	325	0.43	+0.43
Democrats	Jane Errey	1,437	1.90	+1.90
Democrats	Melissa McEwen	730	0.96	+1.90
Democrats	Jim Coates	385	0.51	+0.51
Democrats	John Davey	363	0.48	+0.48
Democrats	John Kennedy	309	0.41	+0.41
Democrats	Jason Wood	308	0.41	+0.41
Democrats	Jonathan Tonge	304	0.40	+0.40
Osborne Independent Group	Chris Uhlmann	1,644	2.17	+2.17
Osborne Independent Group	Chris Carlile	1,122	1.48	+1.48
Group F	Jacqui Rees	1,458	1.93	+1.93
Group F	Noel Haberecht	173	0.23	+0.23
Christian Democrats	Terry Craig	597	0.79	+0.79
Christian Democrats	John Edward Miller	597	0.79	+0.79
Democratic Socialist	Sue Bull	519	0.69	+0.69
Democratic Socialist	Tim Gooden	126	0.17	+0.17
Democratic Socialist	Nicholas Adam Soudakoff	100	0.13	+0.13
Independent	Jeremy Leyland	487	0.64	+0.64
Independent	Pamela Ayson	351	0.46	+0.46
Independent	Jerzy Gray-Grzeszkiewicz	320	0.42	+0.42
Progressive Labour	Robin Bartrum	103	0.14	+0.14
Progressive Labour	Bora Kanra	94	0.12	+0.12
Independent	John Hancock	166	0.22	+0.22
Independent	Nick Dyer	139	0.18	+0.18
Independent	Peter Willmott	60	0.08	+0.08
Independent	Roger John Nicholls	47	0.06	+0.06
Independent	Daryl Arthur Black	42	0.06	+0.06
Total formal votes		75,666	95.93	+1.82
Informal votes		3,213	4.07	−1.82
Turnout		78,879	90.42	+2.91
Party total votes
Liberal		31,370	41.46	−1.39
Labor		19,404	25.64	−5.16
Greens		7,650	10.11	−0.01
Moore Independents		5,261	6.95	−1.80
Democrats		3,836	5.07	+1.87
Osborne Independent Group		2,766	3.66	+3.66
Group F		1,631	2.16	+2.16
Christian Democrats		1,194	1.58	+1.58
Democratic Socialist		745	0.98	+0.98
Independent	Jeremy Leyland	487	0.64	+0.64
Independent	Pamela Ayson	351	0.46	+0.46
Independent	Jerzy Gray-Grzeszkiewicz	320	0.42	+0.42
Progressive Labour	Robin Bartrum	197	0.26	+0.26
Independent	John Hancock	166	0.22	+0.22
Independent	Nick Dyer	139	0.18	+0.18
Independent	Peter Willmott	60	0.08	+0.08
Independent	Roger John Nicholls	47	0.06	+0.06
Independent	Daryl Arthur Black	42	0.06	+0.06
Liberal hold		Swing	+4.79	
Liberal hold		Swing	−2.04	
Liberal hold		Swing	−0.97	
Labor hold		Swing	+3.96	
Labor hold		Swing	+3.96	
Greens hold		Swing	−0.16	
Moore Independents hold		Swing	−0.53	

== See also ==
- List of Australian Capital Territory elections
