= Results of the 1995 Australian Capital Territory election =

This is a list of Legislative Assembly results for the 1995 Australian Capital Territory election.

== Results summary ==
Australian Capital Territory election, 18 February 1995 Legislative Assembly << 1992–1998 >>
Enrolled voters	196,959				
Votes cast	176,264		Turnout	89.5%	-0.8
Informal votes	10,994		Informal	6.2%	-0.2
Summary of votes by party
Party	Primary votes	%	Swing	Seats	Change
Liberal	66,895	40.5	+11.5	7	+1
Labor	52,276	31.6	-8.3	6	-2
Greens	14,967	9.1	+9.1	2	+2
Moore Independents	11,645	7.1	+1.5	1	-1
Independent	9,260	5.6	+4.1	1	+1
Democrats	6,457	3.9	-0.6	0	±0
Smokers Are Voters And Civil Rights	3,770	2.3	+2.3	0	±0
Total	165,270			17	

== Results by electorate ==
=== Brindabella ===
1995 Australian Capital Territory election: Brindabella
Party	Candidate	Votes	%	±%
Quota		8,317		
Liberal	Tony De Domenico (elected 1)	6,262	12.55	NA
Liberal	Trevor Kaine (elected 2)	4,449	8.92	NA
Liberal	Louise Littlewood	2,919	5.85	NA
Liberal	Brian Lowe	2,682	5.38	NA
Liberal	Sandie Brooke	2,182	4.37	NA
Labor	Andrew Whitecross (elected 4)	5,665	11.35	NA
Labor	Bill Wood (elected 5)	4,482	8.98	NA
Labor	Annette Ellis	3,142	6.30	NA
Labor	Steve Whan	1,263	2.53	NA
Labor	Eva Cawthorne	1,206	2.42	NA
Independent	Paul Osborne (elected 5)	5,604	11.23	NA
Greens	Andrew Parratt	2,071	4.15	NA
Greens	Julie McInness	956	1.92	NA
Greens	Liz Stephens	938	1.88	NA
Moore Independents	Stephanie Isaacson	1,025	2.05	NA
Moore Independents	Nick Isaacson	882	1.77	NA
Democrats	Lyn Forceville	1,225	2.46	NA
Democrats	Charlie Bell	653	1.31	NA
Smokers Are Voters And Civil Rights	Stan Kowalski	602	1.21	NA
Smokers Are Voters And Civil Rights	Keith Dencio	514	1.03	NA
Independent	Margaret Kobier	726	1.45	NA
Independent	Tony Savage	344	0.69	NA
Independent	Janice Ferguson	105	0.21	NA
Total formal votes		49,897	93.77	NA
Informal votes		3,317	6.23	NA
Turnout		53,214	91.23	NA
Party total votes
Liberal		18,494	37.06	NA
Labor		15,758	31.58	NA
Independent	Paul Osborne	5,604	11.23	NA
Greens		3,965	7.95	NA
Moore Independents		1,907	3.82	NA
Democrats		1,878	3.76	NA
Smokers Are Voters And Civil Rights		1,116	2.24	NA
Independent	Margaret Kobier	726	1.45	NA
Independent	Tony Savage	344	0.69	NA
Independent	Janice Ferguson	105	0.21	NA
Liberal win		(new seat)		
Liberal win		(new seat)		
Labor win		(new seat)		
Labor win		(new seat)		
Independent win		(new seat)		

=== Ginninderra ===
1995 Australian Capital Territory election: Ginninderra
Party	Candidate	Votes	%	±%
Quota		7,990		
Liberal	Bill Stefaniak (elected 2)	7,559	15.77	NA
Liberal	Cheryl Hill	3,741	7.80	NA
Liberal	Harold Hird (elected 4)	3,526	7.36	NA
Liberal	Lyle Dunne	3,059	6.38	NA
Liberal	Martin Gordon	1,622	3.38	NA
Labor	Wayne Berry (elected 1)	7,719	16.10	NA
Labor	Roberta McRae (elected 3)	2,840	5.92	NA
Labor	Fiona Wilson	1,967	4.10	NA
Labor	Ellnor Grassby	1,912	3.99	NA
Labor	Jacqueline Shea	1,255	2.62	NA
Greens	Lucy Horodny (elected 5)	2,332	4.86	NA
Greens	Michelle Rielly	1,000	2.09	NA
Greens	Gary Corr	844	1.76	NA
Moore Independents	Helen Szuty	2,575	5.37	NA
Moore Independents	Graeme Evans	1,262	2.63	NA
Democrats	Peter Main	1,740	3.63	NA
Democrats	Peter Granleese	680	1.42	NA
Smokers Are Voters And Civil Rights	Lorraine Bevan	672	1.40	NA
Smokers Are Voters And Civil Rights	Donovan Ballard	575	1.20	NA
Independent	Kevin Connor	1,059	2.21	NA
Total formal votes		47,939	93.28	NA
Informal votes		3,455	6.72	NA
Turnout		51,394	90.56	NA
Party total votes
Liberal		19,507	40.69	NA
Labor		15,693	32.74	NA
Greens		4,176	8.71	NA
Moore Independents		3,837	8.00	NA
Democrats		2,420	5.05	NA
Smokers Are Voters And Civil Rights		1,247	2.60	NA
Independent	Kevin Connor	1,059	2.21	NA
Liberal win		(new seat)		
Liberal win		(new seat)		
Labor win		(new seat)		
Labor win		(new seat)		
Greens win		(new seat)		

=== Molonglo ===
1995 Australian Capital Territory election: Molonglo
Party	Candidate	Votes	%	±%
Quota		8,430		
Liberal	Kate Carnell (elected 1)	19,386	28.75	NA
Liberal	Gary Humphries (elected 4)	3,074	4.56	NA
Liberal	Greg Cornwell (elected 6)	1,769	2.62	NA
Liberal	Lucinda Spier	1,432	2.12	NA
Liberal	Gwen Wilcox	1,293	1.92	NA
Liberal	Greg Aouad	1,033	1.53	NA
Liberal	David Ash	907	1.35	NA
Labor	Rosemary Follett (elected 2)	14,460	21.44	NA
Labor	Terry Connolly (elected 3)	3,017	4.47	NA
Labor	David Lamont	1,251	1.86	NA
Labor	Marion Reilly	609	0.90	NA
Labor	Michael Wilson	592	0.88	NA
Labor	Simon Corbell	462	0.69	NA
Labor	Silvia Zamora	434	0.64	NA
Greens	Kerrie Tucker (elected 5)	4,255	6.31	NA
Greens	Natasha Davis	1,470	2.18	NA
Greens	Shane Rattenbury	1,101	1.63	NA
Moore Independents	Michael Moore (elected 7)	4,753	7.05	NA
Moore Independents	Tona Ven Raay	595	0.88	NA
Moore Independents	Mark Dunstone	553	0.82	NA
Democrats	Nicola Appleyard	1,192	1.77	NA
Democrats	Greg Kramer	967	1.43	NA
Smokers Are Voters And Civil Rights	John McMahon	744	1.10	NA
Smokers Are Voters And Civil Rights	John Reavell	663	0.98	NA
Group F	Arthur Burns	265	0.39	NA
Group F	Terry De Luca	208	0.31	NA
Independent	Regina Slazenger	319	0.47	NA
Group H	Allison Dellit	183	0.27	NA
Group H	Alex Middleton	64	0.09	NA
Independent	Mike Boland	234	0.35	NA
Independent	Fred Weston	149	0.22	NA
Total formal votes		67,434	94.11	NA
Informal votes		4,222	5.89	NA
Turnout		71,656	87.51	NA
Party total votes
Liberal		28,894	42.85	NA
Labor		20,825	30.88	NA
Greens		6,826	10.12	NA
Moore Independents		5,901	8.75	NA
Democrats		2,159	3.20	NA
Smokers Are Voters And Civil Rights		1,407	2.09	NA
Group F		473	0.70	NA
Independent	Regina Slazenger	319	0.47	NA
Group H		247	0.37	NA
Independent	Mike Boland	234	0.35	NA
Independent	Fred Weston	149	0.22	NA
Liberal win		(new seat)		
Liberal win		(new seat)		
Liberal win		(new seat)		
Labor win		(new seat)		
Labor win		(new seat)		
Greens win		(new seat)		
Moore Independents win		(new seat)		

== See also ==
- List of Australian Capital Territory elections
