= Members of the Australian Capital Territory Legislative Assembly, 1998–2001 =

Members of the Australian Capital Territory Legislative Assembly, 1998–2001

This is a list of members of the Australian Capital Territory Legislative Assembly from 1998 to 2001:

Name	Party	Electorate	Term in office
Wayne Berry	ALP	Ginninderra	1989–2008
Jacqui Burke ^{[4]}	Liberal	Molonglo	2000–2001, 2002–2008
Kate Carnell ^{[4]}	Liberal	Molonglo	1992–2000
Simon Corbell	ALP	Molonglo	1996–2016
Greg Cornwell	Liberal	Molonglo	1992–2004
John Hargreaves	ALP	Brindabella	1998–2012
Harold Hird	Liberal	Ginninderra	1995–2001
Gary Humphries	Liberal	Molonglo	1989–2002
Trevor Kaine	United Canberra Party ^{[3]}	Brindabella	1989–2001
Michael Moore	Independent ^{[2]}	Molonglo	1989–2001
Paul Osborne	Osborne Independent Group	Brindabella	1995–2001
Ted Quinlan	ALP	Molonglo	1998–2006
Dave Rugendyke	Osborne Independent Group ^{[1]}	Ginninderra	1998–2001
Brendan Smyth	Liberal	Brindabella	1998–2016
Jon Stanhope	ALP	Ginninderra	1998–2011
Bill Stefaniak	Liberal	Ginninderra	1989–1992, 1994–2008
Kerrie Tucker	Greens	Molonglo	1995–2004
Bill Wood	ALP	Brindabella	1989–2004

^{1} Although Dave Rugendyke was elected on the Osborne Independent Group ticket, he took his place in the Assembly as an independent, separate from any party grouping.
^{2} Though Michael Moore was elected as an independent, he joined Kate Carnell's Liberal government as a minister on 28 April 1998. Despite this, he continued to sit in the Assembly as an independent.
^{3} Trevor Kaine resigned from the Liberal Party on 13 May 1998. On 28 May, he announced that he would stand as a representative of the "Canberra Liberals", but then, on 30 July, registered the United Canberra Party, which he represented for the remainder of his term.
^{4} Liberal member Kate Carnell resigned from the Assembly on 17 October 2000. The vacancy was filled by Liberal Jacqui Burke.

== See also ==
- 1998 Australian Capital Territory election
