= Members of the Australian Capital Territory Legislative Assembly, 2001–2004 =

Members of the Australian Capital Territory Legislative Assembly, 2001–2004

This is a list of members of the Australian Capital Territory Legislative Assembly from 2001 to 2004.

Name	Party	Electorate	Term in office
Wayne Berry	ALP	Ginninderra	1989–2008
Jacqui Burke ^{[1]}	Liberal	Molonglo	2001, 2002–2008
Simon Corbell	ALP	Molonglo	1996–2016
Greg Cornwell	Liberal	Molonglo	1992–2004
Helen Cross	Liberal/Independent ^{[2]}	Molonglo	2001–2004
Roslyn Dundas	Democrat	Ginninderra	2001–2004
Vicki Dunne	Liberal	Ginninderra	2001–2020
Katy Gallagher	ALP	Molonglo	2001–2014
John Hargreaves	ALP	Brindabella	1998–2012
Gary Humphries ^{[1]}	Liberal	Molonglo	1989–2002
Karin MacDonald	ALP	Brindabella	2001–2008
Steve Pratt	Liberal	Brindabella	2001–2008
Ted Quinlan	ALP	Molonglo	1998–2006
Brendan Smyth	Liberal	Brindabella	1998–2016
Jon Stanhope	ALP	Ginninderra	1998–2011
Bill Stefaniak	Liberal	Ginninderra	1989–1992, 1994–2008
Kerrie Tucker	Greens	Molonglo	1995–2004
Bill Wood	ALP	Brindabella	1989–2004

^{1} Liberal member Gary Humphries resigned on 25 November 2002 to take up the position in the Australian Senate that had been vacated by Margaret Reid. The vacancy was filled by Liberal Jacqui Burke.
^{2} Helen Cross was expelled from the Liberal Party on 23 September 2002 after tensions with other party members. She served out the remainder of her term as an independent.

== See also ==
- 2001 Australian Capital Territory election
