= Members of the Australian Capital Territory Legislative Assembly, 1995–1998 =

Members of the Australian Capital Territory Legislative Assembly, 1995–1998

This is a list of members of the Australian Capital Territory Legislative Assembly from 1995 to 1998. This was the first time the three-electorate, Hare-Clark system was used to elect members of the Assembly.

Name	Party	Electorate	Term in office
Wayne Berry	ALP	Ginninderra	1989–2008
Kate Carnell	Liberal	Molonglo	1992–2000
Terry Connolly^{[3]}	ALP	Molonglo	1989–1996
Simon Corbell^{[2]}	ALP	Molonglo	1996–2016
Greg Cornwell	Liberal	Molonglo	1992–2004
Tony De Domenico^{[3]}	Liberal	Brindabella	1992–1997
Rosemary Follett^{[1]}	ALP	Molonglo	1989–1996
Harold Hird	Liberal	Ginninderra	1995–2001
Lucy Horodny	Greens	Ginninderra	1995–1998
Gary Humphries	Liberal	Molonglo	1989–2002
Trevor Kaine	Liberal	Brindabella	1989–2001
Louise Littlewood^{[3]}	Liberal	Brindabella	1997–1998
Roberta McRae	ALP	Ginninderra	1992–1998
Michael Moore	Moore Independents Group	Molonglo	1989–2001
Marion Reilly^{[1]}	ALP	Molonglo	1996–1998
Paul Osborne	Osborne Independent Group	Brindabella	1995–2001
Bill Stefaniak	Liberal	Ginninderra	1989–1992, 1994–2008
Kerrie Tucker	Greens	Molonglo	1995–2004
Andrew Whitecross	ALP	Brindabella	1995–1998
Bill Wood	ALP	Brindabella	1989–2004

^{1} ALP member Terry Connolly resigned from the Assembly on 19 February 1996. The vacancy was filled by the ALP's Marion Reilly.
^{2} ALP member Rosemary Follett resigned from the Assembly on 12 December 1996. The vacancy was filled by the ALP's Simon Corbell.
^{3} Liberal member Tony De Domenico resigned from the Assembly on 30 January 1997. The vacancy was filled by Liberal Louise Littlewood.

== See also ==
- 1995 Australian Capital Territory election
