= Results of the 2004 Australian Capital Territory election =

This is a list of Legislative Assembly results for the 2004 Australian Capital Territory election.

== Results summary ==
Australian Capital Territory election, 16 October 2004 Legislative Assembly << 2001–2008 >>
Enrolled voters	226,098				
Votes cast	209,749		Turnout	92.8%	+1.9
Informal votes	5,560		Informal	2.7%	-1.3
Summary of votes by party
Party	Primary votes	%	Swing	Seats	Change
Labor	95,635	46.8	+5.1	9	+1
Liberal	71,083	34.8	+3.2	7	±0
Greens	18,997	9.3	+0.2	1	±0
Democrats	4,595	2.3	-5.8	0	-1
Independent	3,773	1.8	-0.2	0	±0
Liberal Democrats	2,666	1.3	+0.3	0	±0
Helen Cross Independents	2,608	1.3	+1.3	0	±0
Free Range Canberra	1,429	0.7	+0.7	0	±0
Harold Hird Independents	1,371	0.7	+0.7	0	±0
Christian Democrats	1,370	0.7	+0.7	0	±0
ACT Equality Party	662	0.3	+0.3	0	±0
Total	204,189			17	

== Results by electorate ==
=== Brindabella ===
2004 Australian Capital Territory election: Brindabella
Party	Candidate	Votes	%	±%
Quota		9,962		
Labor	John Hargreaves (elected 2)	10,634	17.79	+2.58
Labor	Karin MacDonald (elected 3)	4,960	8.30	+1.10
Labor	Mick Gentleman (elected 4)	4,419	7.39	+7.39
Labor	Paschal Leahy	3,752	6.28	+6.28
Labor	Rebecca Logue	3,572	5.98	+5.98
Liberal	Brendan Smyth (elected 1)	12,810	21.43	+5.66
Liberal	Steve Pratt (elected 5)	3,621	6.06	−0.97
Liberal	Steve Doszpot	3,483	5.83	+2.32
Liberal	Megan Purcell	2,229	3.73	+3.73
Liberal	Karen Schilling	1,987	3.32	+3.32
Greens	Kathryn Kelly	2,345	3.92	+0.77
Greens	Graham Jensen	1,991	3.32	+3.32
Christian Democrats	Thelma Janes	766	1.28	+1.28
Christian Democrats	Erol Francis Byrne	604	1.01	+1.01
Democrats	Rowena Bew	524	0.88	+0.88
Democrats	Marc Emerson	400	0.67	+0.67
Independent	Burl Doble	782	1.31	+1.31
Liberal Democrats	David Garrett	233	0.39	+0.39
Liberal Democrats	Matthew Harding	209	0.35	+0.35
Free Range Canberra	Stephanie Elliott	348	0.58	+0.58
ACT Equality Party	Lance Muir	100	0.17	+0.17
Total formal votes		59,769	97.26	+1.67
Informal votes		1,682	2.74	−1.67
Turnout		61,451	94.14	+1.64
Party total votes
Labor		27,337	45.74	+1.77
Liberal		24,130	40.37	+8.51
Greens		4,336	7.25	+1.82
Christian Democrats		1,370	2.29	+2.29
Democrats		924	1.55	−5.41
Independent	Burl Doble	782	1.31	+1.31
Liberal Democrats		442	0.74	+0.22
Free Range Canberra		348	0.58	+0.58
ACT Equality Party		100	0.17	+0.17
Labor hold		Swing	+2.58	
Labor hold		Swing	+1.10	
Labor hold		Swing	+7.39	
Liberal hold		Swing	+5.66	
Liberal hold		Swing	−0.97	

=== Ginninderra ===
2004 Australian Capital Territory election: Ginninderra
Party	Candidate	Votes	%	±%
Quota		9,901		
Labor	Jon Stanhope (elected 1)	21,929	36.92	+12.44
Labor	Wayne Berry (elected 4)	2,469	4.16	−2.97
Labor	Mary Porter (elected 5)	2,268	3.82	+3.82
Labor	Susan McCarthy	1,823	3.07	−1.63
Labor	Ross Maxwell	1,293	2.18	+2.18
Liberal	Bill Stefaniak (elected 2)	10,204	17.18	+3.59
Liberal	Vicki Dunne (elected 3)	3,367	5.67	+2.06
Liberal	Ilona Fraser	2,358	3.97	+0.18
Liberal	Briant Clark	1,836	3.06	+3.06
Liberal	Bob Sobey	1,504	3.06	+3.06
Greens	Meredith Hunter	3,030	5.10	+5.10
Greens	Ben O'Callaghan	1,855	3.12	+3.12
Democrats	Roslyn Dundas	2,180	3.67	−0.28
Democrats	Roberta Wood	263	0.44	+0.44
Harold Hird Independents	Harold Hird	1,170	1.97	−2.42
Harold Hird Independents	Julie-Anne Papathanasiou	201	0.34	+0.34
Liberal Democrats	Adam Porter	405	0.68	+0.68
Liberal Democrats	Rose Pappalado	318	0.54	+0.54
Free Range Canberra	Mike O'Shaughnessy	250	0.42	+0.42
Free Range Canberra	Anne Moore	201	0.34	+0.34
Non-party	Darcy Henry	197	0.33	+0.33
Non-party	John E. Gorman	85	0.14	+0.14
ACT Equality Party	John Simsons	197	0.33	+0.33
Total formal votes		59,403	97.28	+1.27
Informal votes		1,660	2.72	−1.27
Turnout		51,063	93.55	+1.84
Party total votes
Labor		29,782	50.14	+7.32
Liberal		19,269	32.44	+4.52
Greens		4,885	8.22	+0.28
Democrats		2,443	4.11	−5.60
Harold Hird Independents		1,371	2.31	+2.31
Liberal Democrats		723	1.22	−0.66
Free Range Canberra		451	0.76	+0.76
Non-party		282	0.47	+0.47
ACT Equality Party		197	0.33	+0.33
Labor hold		Swing	+12.44	
Labor hold		Swing	−2.97	
Labor gain from Democrats		Swing	+3.82	
Liberal hold		Swing	+3.59	
Liberal hold		Swing	+2.06	

=== Molonglo ===
2004 Australian Capital Territory election: Molonglo
Party	Candidate	Votes	%	±%
Quota		10,628		
Labor	Ted Quinlan (elected 2)	10,098	11.88	+2.54
Labor	Katy Gallagher (elected 1)	9,856	11.59	+7.21
Labor	Simon Corbell (elected 3)	8,465	9.96	−0.64
Labor	Mike Hettinger	3,405	4.01	+4.01
Labor	Andrew Barr	3,219	3.79	+3.79
Labor	Kim Sattler	2,058	2.42	+2.42
Labor	Adina Cirson	1,415	1.66	+1.66
Liberal	Richard Mulcahy (elected 5)	6,583	7.74	+7.74
Liberal	Zed Seselja (elected 7)	5,159	6.07	+6.07
Liberal	Jacqui Burke (elected 6)	4,983	5.86	+3.61
Liberal	Lucille Bailie	3,459	4.07	+4.07
Liberal	David Kibbey	2,691	3.17	+3.17
Liberal	Ron Forrester	2,418	2.84	+2.84
Liberal	Gordon Scott	2,391	2.81	+2.81
Greens	Deb Foskey (elected 4)	3,938	4.63	+3.79
Greens	Charlie Pahlman	2,978	3.50	+3.50
Greens	Amanda Bresnan	2,860	3.36	+3.36
Helen Cross Independents	Helen Cross	2,490	2.93	−0.07
Helen Cross Independents	Renee Stramandinoli	118	0.14	+0.14
Independent	Ken Helm	2,202	2.59	+2.59
Liberal Democrats	John Humphreys	1,168	1.37	+1.37
Liberal Democrats	Melanie Sutcliffe	333	0.39	+0.39
Democrats	Robert Rose	678	0.80	+0.80
Democrats	Fred Leftwich	550	0.65	−2.31
Free Range Canberra	Simone Gray	336	0.40	+0.40
Free Range Canberra	Jo McKinley	294	0.35	+0.35
ACT Equality Party	John Simsons	274	0.32	+0.32
ACT Equality Party	Nancy-Louise McCullough	91	0.11	+0.11
Independent	Kurt Kennedy	168	0.20	+0.20
Independent	Tony Farrell	149	0.18	+0.18
Non-Party	John Farrell	76	0.09	+0.09
Non-Party	Robert Fearn	30	0.04	+0.04
Independent	Luke Garner	84	0.10	+0.10
Total formal votes		85,017	97.46	+1.09
Informal votes		2,218	2.54	−1.09
Turnout		87,235	91.30	+2.08
Party total votes
Labor		38,516	45.30	+5.99
Liberal		27,684	32.56	−1.57
Greens		9,776	11.50	−1.07
Helen Cross Independents		2,608	3.07	+3.07
Independent	Ken Helm	2,202	2.59	+2.59
Liberal Democrats		1,501	1.77	+1.77
Democrats		1,128	1.44	−6.19
Free Range Canberra		630	0.74	+0.74
ACT Equality Party		365	0.43	+0.43
Independent	Kurt Kennedy	168	0.20	+0.20
Independent	Tony Farrell	149	0.18	+0.18
Non-Party		106	0.12	+0.12
Independent	Luke Garner	84	0.10	+0.10
Labor hold		Swing	+7.21	
Labor hold		Swing	+2.54	
Labor hold		Swing	−0.64	
Liberal hold		Swing	+7.74	
Liberal hold		Swing	+3.61	
Liberal hold		Swing	+6.07	
Greens hold		Swing	+3.79	

== See also ==
- List of Australian Capital Territory elections
