= 1998 Australian Capital Territory election =

- 21 February 1998

All 17 seats of the Australian Capital Territory Legislative Assembly 9 seats needed for a majority
- Turnout: 91.8 (▲2.3 pp)
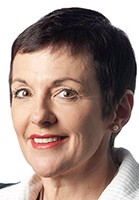

	First party	Second party	Third party
			OIG
Leader	Kate Carnell	Wayne Berry	Paul Osborne
Party	Liberal	Labor	Osborne Independent Group
Leader since	21 April 1993	19 August 1997
Leader's seat	Molonglo	Ginninderra	Brindabella
Last election	7 seats	6 seats	Did not exist
Seats before	7	6	1
Seats won	7	6	2
Seat change	Steady	Steady	▲1
Primary vote	68,221	49,798	16,426
Percentage	37.8%	27.6%	9.1%
Swing	▼2.7	▼4.0	▲9.1
	Fourth party	Fifth party	Sixth party
	GRN	MI	IND
Leader	No leader	Michael Moore	N/A
Party	Greens	Moore Independents	Independents
Leader since	—	1991	—
Leader's seat	—	Molonglo	—
Last election	2 seats	1 seat	1 seat
Seats before	2	1	0
Seats won	1	1	0
Seat change	▼1	Steady	▼1
Primary vote	16,417	5,261	9,232
Percentage	9.1%	2.9%	5.12%
Swing	Steady	▼	▼0.5
- Results by electorate
Chief Minister before election
Kate Carnell
Liberal
Resulting Chief Minister
Kate Carnell
Liberal

Elections to the Australian Capital Territory Legislative Assembly were held on Saturday, 21 February 1998. The incumbent Liberal Party, led by Kate Carnell, was challenged by the Labor Party, led by Wayne Berry. Candidates were elected to fill three multi-member electorates using a single transferable vote method, known as the Hare-Clark system. The result was another hung parliament. However the Liberals, with the largest representation in the 17-member unicameral Assembly, formed Government with the support of independents Michael Moore, Paul Osborne, and Dave Rugendyke. Carnell was elected Chief Minister at the first sitting of the fourth Assembly on 19 March 1998.

Subsequent to the election and during the life of the fourth Assembly, on 18 October 2000, Carnell stepped down as Chief Minister and was replaced by Gary Humphries.

This would be the last time the Liberal Party (or the Coalition) would form government at a state or territory level after an election until the 2008 Western Australian state election. Also, this is the last time the Liberal Party has formed government after an election in the ACT.

== Key dates ==
- Close of party registration: 15 January 1998
- Pre-election period commenced/nominations opened: 16 January 1998
- Rolls closed: 23 January 1998
- Nominations closed: 29 January 1998
- Nominations declared/ballot paper order determined: 30 January 1998
- Pre-poll voting commenced: 2 February 1998
- Polling day: 21 February 1998
- Poll declared: 17 March 1998

== Candidates ==
Sitting members at the time of the election are listed in bold. Tickets that elected at least one MLA are highlighted in the relevant colour. Successful candidates are indicated by an asterisk (*).

=== Retiring Members ===
==== Greens ====
- Lucy Horodny (Ginninderra)

=== Brindabella ===
Five seats were up for election. The Labor Party was defending two seats. The Liberal Party was defending two seats. The Paul Osborne Independent Group was defending one seat.

Labor candidates	Liberal candidates	Greens candidates	Democrats candidates
John Hargreaves*; Karen Mow; Kathryn Presdee; **Andrew Whitecross**; **Bill Wood***	Geoff Didier; Margaret Head; **Trevor Kaine***; **Louise Littlewood**; Brendan Smyth*	Sue Ellerman; Peter Farrelly; Liz Stephens; Fiona Tito	Charlie Bell; Geoff Dodd; Anna Grant; Mark Peirce; Adele Tait
Osborne candidates	CDP candidates	Ungrouped	
Linda Moore; **Paul Osborne***	Stephen Carter; Francis Piccin	Tom Cornwell (Ind); Margaret A Kobier (Ind); Margot Marshall (Ind); Peter Menegazzo (Ind); Leonard Munday	

=== Ginninderra ===
Five seats were up for election. The Labor Party was defending two seats. The Liberal Party was defending two seats. The Greens were defending one seat.

Labor candidates	Liberal candidates	Greens candidates	Democrats candidates
**Wayne Berry***; **Roberta McRae**; Joy Nicholls; Chris Sant; Jon Stanhope*	Terry Birtles; Vicki Dunne; Warwick Gow; **Harold Hird***; **Bill Stefaniak***	Jennifer Palma; Shane Rattenbury; Dierk Von Behrens; Molly Wainwright	Alex Allars; Jocelyn Bell; Terry Holder; Stephen Selden; Peter Vandenbroek
Osborne candidates	CDP candidates	PLP candidates	Ungrouped
Hilary Back; Dave Rugendyke*	John Richard Miller; Ivan Young	Renee Brooks; Morgan Graham	Alice Chu (Ind); Cheryl Hill; Derek Hill; Connie Steven (Ind); Helen Szuty; Manuel Xyrakis

=== Molonglo ===
Seven seats were up for election. The Labor Party was defending two seats. The Liberal Party was defending three seats. The Greens were defending one seat. The Moore Independents were defending one seat.

Labor candidates	Liberal candidates	Greens candidates	Democrats candidates	Moore candidates
**Simon Corbell***; Chris Flaherty; Steve Garth; Tania McMurtry; John O'Keefe; Ted Quinlan*; **Marion Reilly**	Greg Aouad; Jacqui Burke; **Kate Carnell***; **Greg Cornwell***; **Gary Humphries***; John Louttit; Nick Tolley	Miko Kirschbaum; Caroline Le Couteur; Tiffany Lynch; Roland Manderson; Niki Ruker; Michael Smitheram; **Kerrie Tucker***	John Davey; Jane Errey; John Kennedy; Melissa McEwen; Jonathan Tonge; Jason Wood	Joan Kellett; **Michael Moore***
Osborne candidates	CDP candidates	PLP candidates	DSP candidates	Ungrouped
Chris Carlile; Chris Uhlmann	Terry Craig; John Edward Miller	Robin Bartrum; Bora Kanra	Sue Bull; Tim Gooden; Nicholas Soudakoff	Pamela Ayson (Ind); Daryl Arthur Black (Ind); Nick Dyer (Ind); Jerzy Gray-Grzeszkiewicz (Ind); Noel Habercht; John Hancock (Ind); Jeremy Leyland (Shooters ACT); Roger Nicholls (Ind); Jacqui Rees; Peter Willmott (Ind)

== Results ==
Party	Votes	%	+/–	Seats	+/–
Liberal	68,221	37.83	▼2.65	7	0
Labor	49,798	27.61	▼4.02	6	0
Osborne Independent Group	16,426	9.11	New	2	New
Greens	16,417	9.10	▲0.04	1	▼1
Democrats	10,786	5.98	▲2.07	0	0
Independents	9,232	5.12	▼0.48	0	▼1
Moore Independents	5,261	2.92	▼4.13	1	0
Christian Democrats	3,027	1.68	▲1.68	0	0
Democratic Socialist Perspective	745	0.41	▲0.41	0	0
Progressive Labour	437	0.24	▲0.24	0	New
Total	180,350	100.00	–	17	–
Valid votes	180,350	95.68			
Invalid/blank votes	8,134	4.32	▼1.9		
Total votes	188,484	100.00	–		
Registered voters/turnout	205,248	91.83	▲2.3		

Results by electorate
	Brindabella			Ginninderra			Molonglo		
Party	Votes	%	Seats	Votes	%	Seats	Votes	%	Seats
Liberal	20,110	37.1	2	16,741	33.2	2	31,370	41.5	3
Labor	15,463	28.5	2	14,931	29.6	2	19,404	25.6	2
Osborne Independent Group	8,804	16.2	1	4,856	9.6	1	2,766	3.7	0
Greens	4,383	8.1	0	4,384	8.7	0	7,650	10.1	1
Democrats	3,336	6.2	0	3,614	7.2	0	3,836	5.1	0
Independent	1,244	2.3	0	4,745	9.4	0	3,243	4.3	0
Moore Independents	—	—	—	—	—	—	5,261	7.0	1
Christian Democrats	911	1.7	0	922	1.8	0	1,194	1.6	0
Democratic Socialist	—	—	—	—	—	—	745	1.0	0
Progressive Labour	—	—	—	240	0.5	0	197	0.3	0

Distribution of seats
Electorate	Seats held	
Brindabella	O	
Ginninderra	O	
Molonglo		M

M - Moore Independents
O - Osborne Independent Group

== See also ==
- Members of the Australian Capital Territory Legislative Assembly, 1998–2001
- Second Carnell Ministry
- Humphries Ministry
- List of Australian Capital Territory elections
