= Lucy Horodny =

Australian politician (born 1957)

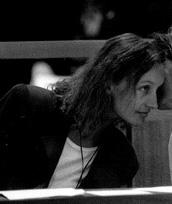

Member of ACT Legislative Assembly
- In office 18 February 1995 – 21 February 1998 Serving with Berry, Hird, McRae and Stefaniak
- Preceded by: Electorate created
- Succeeded by: Dave Rugendyke
- Constituency: Ginninderra

Personal details
- Born: 15 September 1948 (age 78)
- Party: ACT Greens

Lucy Alesia Horodny (Ukrainian: Люсі Алесія Городня; born 4 March 1957) is an Australian politician and environmentalist.

Horodny, who is of Ukrainian descent, first made her name as an activist for the Wilderness Society. She entered politics in 1995, running as a Greens candidate for the Australian Capital Territory Legislative Assembly and was immediately successful at the first ever run of the new party: She subsequently defeated liberal independent Helen Szuty, and took her place as one of two Green members in the Assembly, alongside Kerrie Tucker.

Immediately after the 1995 election, Horodny and Tucker caused some controversy among sections of the left wing when they supported the installation of Liberal Kate Carnell as Chief Minister – though they often clashed with Carnell and her party in parliament over social and environmental issues.

In her one term in the Legislative Assembly, she was a strong advocate for environmental causes, both inside the ACT, such as the preservation of the Black Mountain area (which had been threatened by the Gungahlin Drive Extension), and outside, such as her attempts to save Tasmania's environmentally sensitive Tarkine wilderness area from logging and development. She also advocated for several progressive causes, such as a bid to legalise voluntary euthanasia in the ACT (which only narrowly failed). She also vocally opposed the demolition of the Royal Canberra Hospital, preferring that the buildings be reused, and later, once the demolition became inevitable, opposed the government's preferred method, implosion, on environmental grounds.

Horodny adopted a child in 1997, and announced soon after that she would take a year off from work and step down at the coming election. She was replaced in the Legislative Assembly by conservative independent Dave Rugendyke.
