= Ian Black (politician) =

Australian politician (1943–2020)

Ian Howard Black (31 August 1943 – 13 July 2020) was an Australian politician.

Black was an Independent member of the Australian Capital Territory Advisory Council from 1970 to 1974. The Advisory Council was replaced with a Legislative Assembly in 1975, and Black was a member for Canberra from 1975 to 1979. Black was also an Independent candidate for the Australian Senate in the 1975 Federal Election for the Australian Capital Territory. He was an Independent candidate for the electorate of Molonglo in the 2001 Australian Capital Territory election for the ACT Legislative Assembly, which replaced the House of Assembly, which, in turn, had replaced the earlier Legislative Assembly of which Black had been a member.

Prior to being a politician, Black was a police officer with the Commonwealth Police, and then the ACT Police. He subsequently ran a supermarket, a restaurant, and two wineries.

Black had a partner, Clare Leeuwin-Clark, as well as five children. He died in Victoria in 2020, aged 76.
