= Canberra and South East Region Environment Centre =

Australian environmental organisation

The Canberra Environment Centre (CEC) is the oldest environmental organisation in the Australian Capital Territory (ACT). It formed in 1974 as an umbrella group to represent and provide services for other environment or environment-related groups. In 2005 it changed its trading name to Canberra Environment Centre (formerly the Canberra and South East Region Environment Centre (CASEREC)) to better reflect the direction of the environment movement and the work it was undertaking in the community. Member groups of the Centre over the years have included the Canberra Organic Growers Society, Canberra Ornithologists Group, Friends of Grasslands, Nature and Society Forum, Zero Waste Australia, South East Forest Alliance, Canberra Bushwalkers, National Park Association of the ACT and Pedal Power. The Centre also has an affiliation with the Conservation Council of the ACT (ConsACT).

In 1978 the ACT government provided CEC with premises in community space adjacent to the Australian National University (ANU). In 2007 the ACT government and the ANU combined to redevelop the site and the Centre was relocated to premises at Acton, on the edge of the ANU campus. The premises houses the largest dedicated environmental library in the ACT, consisting of over 5000 printed items as well as electronic resources relating to environment and sustainability and including a vast resource of material on the environmental and development history of the ACT and surrounding region.

Many prominent environmentalists, environmental practitioners and academics have been associated with CEC over the years, including Professor Steve Dovers (ANU), former ACT MLA Kerrie Tucker, Professor Valerie Brown (ANU), the late philosopher Dr Val Plumwood, naturalist and historian Ian Fraser, Dr Robin Tennant-Wood (University of Canberra), Professor Janis Birkeland (Queensland University of Technology) and ZeroWaste's Gerry Gillespie. The current president of the Management Committee is Ms Kirsten Miller and the current director is Mr Ryan Lungu.

== Projects ==
From 1980 to 2001 CEC published a regular journal, Bogong, which investigated issues of local environmental significance. In 2002-03 the Centre began a new journal, Ecoview, which was discontinued after only three issues. The main work of the Centre now is working with community groups, schools, businesses or individuals to promote sustainability and sustainable practices. Some successful projects have included "The Art of Moving" which used creative media to engage the community on the subject of active transport; "Go Green Get Lean" - a cycle-to-work program; and "Food for Life" which encourages local food production and consumption. Currently, the Centre runs "Grow Together," a kitchen garden program in three childcare centres across the ACT, and the Bike Recyclery, a community initiative that sells second hand bikes and provides people with a disability with employment, in collaboration between LEAD Canberra.

The Centre also runs frequent sustainable living workshops and events throughout the year, including the Annual Canberra Harvest Festival.
