= 2001 Australian Capital Territory election =

Australian election

- 20 October 2001

All 17 seats of the Australian Capital Territory Legislative Assembly 9 seats needed for a majority
- Turnout: 90.9 (▼0.9 pp)
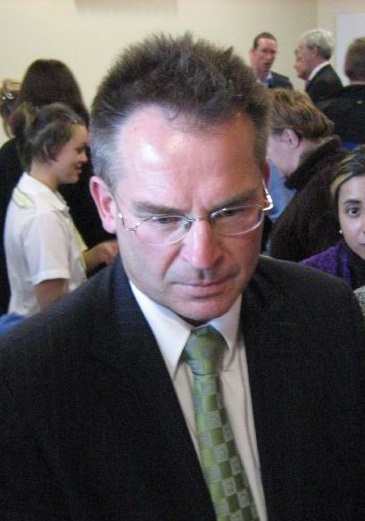

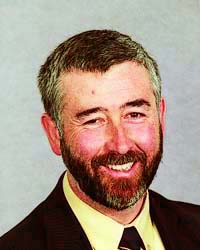

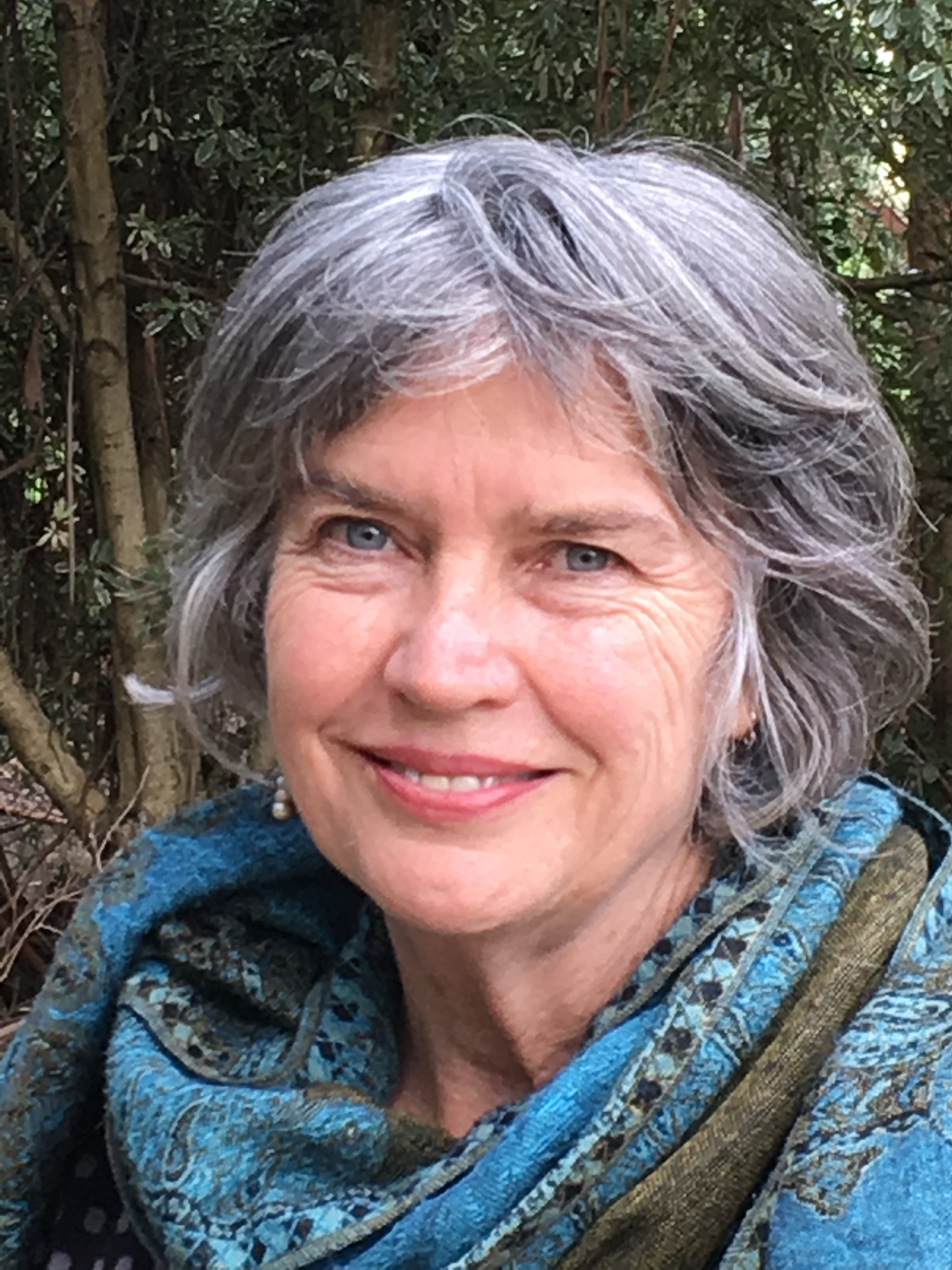
	First party	Second party
Leader	Jon Stanhope	Gary Humphries
Party	Labor	Liberal
Leader since	19 March 1998	18 October 2000
Leader's seat	Ginninderra	Molonglo
Last election	6 seats	7 seats
Seats won	8	7
Seat change	▲2	Steady
Primary vote	79,616	60,390
Percentage	41.7%	31.6%
Swing	▲14.1	▼6.2
	Third party	Fourth party
		DEM
Leader	Kerrie Tucker	N/A
Party	Greens	Democrats
Leader since	21 February 1998	N/A
Leader's seat	Molonglo	N/A
Last election	1 seat	0 seats
Seats won	1	1
Seat change	Steady	▲1
Primary vote	17,369	15,338
Percentage	9.1%	8.0%
Swing	Steady	▲2.1
- Results by electorate
Chief Minister before election
Gary Humphries
Liberal
Elected Chief Minister
Jon Stanhope
Labor

Elections to the Australian Capital Territory Legislative Assembly were held on Saturday, 20 October 2001. The incumbent Liberal Party, led by Gary Humphries, was challenged by the Labor Party, led by Jon Stanhope. Candidates were elected to fill three multi-member electorates using a single transferable vote method, known as the Hare-Clark system.

The result was another hung parliament. However Labor, with the largest representation in the 17-member unicameral Assembly, formed Government with the support of the ACT Greens and Democrats. Stanhope was elected Chief Minister at the first sitting of the fifth Assembly on 12 November 2001. The election was conducted by the ACT Electoral Commission and was the first time in Australia's history that an electronic voting and counting system was used for some, but not all, polling places.

== Key dates ==
- Party registration closed: 13 September 2001
- Pre-election period commenced and nominations opened: 14 September 2001
- Rolls closed: 21 September 2001
- Nominations closed: 26 September 2001
- Nominations declared and ballot paper order determined: 27 September 2001
- Pre-poll voting commenced: 2 October 2001
- Polling day: 20 October 2001
- Scrutiny completed: 1 November 2001
- Poll declared: 5 November 2001
- Legislative Assembly formed: 12 November 2001

== Overview ==
The incumbent centre-right Liberal Party, led by Chief Minister Gary Humphries, attempted to win election for a first time in his own right as Liberal leader, yet a third term after the Liberals had come to power in 1995. They were challenged by the opposition centre-left Labor Party, led by Jon Stanhope, who assumed the Labor leadership in March 1998. A third party, the ACT Greens, held one seat in the Assembly through sitting member, Kerrie Tucker, as well as several minor parties that had been a feature of ACT politics up until this election.

The election saw all 17 members of the Assembly face re-election, with members being elected by the Hare-Clark system of proportional representation. The Assembly is divided into three electorates: five-member Brindabella (including Tuggeranong and parts of the Woden Valley) and Ginninderra (including Belconnen and suburbs) and seven-member Molonglo (including North Canberra, South Canberra, Gungahlin, Weston Creek, and the remainder of the Woden Valley). Election dates are set in statute to occur once every four years; the government has no ability to set the election date.

Following the 1998 election outcome, the Liberals held seven seats; the opposition Labor held six seats, the Osborne independents of Paul Osborne and Dave Rugendyke holding two seats; the Greens holding one seat; and Michael Moore also holding one seat.

During 2000, Chief Minister, Kate Carnell, faced continual criticism over cost blowouts in the redevelopment of Bruce Stadium. Eventually, when faced with a vote of no confidence, Carnell resigned as Chief Minister in October 2000. Her deputy, Gary Humphries, was elected as her replacement. Carnell subsequently resigned from the Assembly on 17 October 2000 and was replaced by Jacqui Burke on 13 January 2001.

The 2001 ACT Legislative Assembly election represented a major milestone in the conduct of elections in Australia with the first use of electronic voting at polling places for parliamentary elections. This election also saw the introduction of electronic counting of ballots for the first time in the ACT.

=== Meninga candidacy ===
The 2001 campaign is perhaps best remembered for the short-lived candidacy of rugby league veteran Mal Meninga, AM. On Monday, 24 September 2001, Meninga declared his candidacy for the ACT Legislative Assembly, running for the electorate of Molonglo. Moments after announcing that he would run for election, Meninga pulled out mid-sentence: "And the thing about that is, I guess, I was a public figure and I was put on the podium where I was just a person out there . . . I'm buggered, I'm sorry, I have to resign." Subsequently, this incident led to the satirical Chaser team instituting the 'Mal Award' for their election television shows, presented to politicians "for the greatest act of political suicide during an election campaign".

== Candidates ==
Sitting members at the time of the election are listed in bold. Tickets that elected at least one MLA are highlighted in the relevant colour. Successful candidates are indicated by an asterisk (*).

=== Retiring Members ===
==== Independent ====
- Michael Moore (Molonglo)

=== Brindabella ===
Five seats were up for election. The Labor Party was defending two seats. The Liberal Party was defending two seats (although Trevor Kaine was contesting the election as a candidate for the United Canberra Party). The Paul Osborne Independent Group was defending one seat.

Labor candidates	Liberal candidates	Greens candidates	Democrats candidates
**John Hargreaves***; Karin MacDonald*; Trevor Santi; Athol Williams; **Bill Wood***	Steve Doszpot; Megan O'Connor; Steve Pratt*; Winnifred Rosser; **Brendan Smyth***	Sue Ellerman; Kathryn Kelly	Jeannette Jolley; Domenic Mico; Mike Welch
Osborne candidates	UCP candidates	LDP candidates	Ungrouped
Donna Bush; **Paul Osborne**	Sandie Brooke; **Trevor Kaine**	Bradley Brown; Darren Kennedy	Danny Alameddine (Ind); May Levantis; Bob Mackenzie; Len Munday (Ind); Bruce Sutherland (Ind); Maria Trudinger (Nurses)

=== Ginninderra ===
Five seats were up for election. The Labor Party was defending two seats. The Liberal Party was defending two seats. Independent MLA Dave Rugendyke, originally elected as an affiliate of Brindabella independent MLA Paul Osborne, was defending one seat.

Labor candidates	Liberal candidates	Greens candidates	Democrats candidates
**Wayne Berry***; John Downey; Susan McCarthy; Vic Rebikoff; **Jon Stanhope***	Vicki Dunne*; Ilona Fraser; **Harold Hird**; Andrew Sarri; **Bill Stefaniak***	Shane Rattenbury; Patricia Woodcroft-Lee	Anthony David; Roslyn Dundas*; Dan McMillan
Rugendyke candidates	LDP candidates	Gungahlin candidates	Ungrouped
Ian Brown; **Dave Rugendyke**	John Humphreys; Susan Morrissey	Gail Jones; John Simsons	Geoff Clarke; Chris Garvie (Ind); Shaun Good (Ind); Darcy Henry; Rhonda James (Nurses)

=== Molonglo ===
Seven seats were up for election. The Labor Party was defending two seats. The Liberal Party was defending three seats. The Greens were defending one seat. One seat had been held by Independent MLA Michael Moore.

Labor candidates	Liberal candidates	Greens candidates	Democrats candidates	Kaine candidates
**Simon Corbell***; Katy Gallagher*; Fred Leftwich; John O'Keefe; **Ted Quinlan***; Marion Reilly; Christina Ryan	**Jacqui Burke**; **Greg Cornwell***; Helen Cross*; **Gary Humphries***; Amalia Matheson; Mark Spill; Manuel Xyrakis	Deb Foskey; Michael Nolan; **Kerrie Tucker***; Victoria Young	Eric Bray; Jane Errey; Stella Jones; Isabel Walters	Colin Cartwright; Alan Parker
Canberra 1st candidates	LDP candidates	Gungahlin candidates	Nurses candidates	Ungrouped
Claire James; Nancy McCullough; Joel Pasternak; Lucinda Spier	Brett Graham; John Purnell-Webb; Duncan Spender	Jonathon Reynolds; Ian Ruecroft	Phillip Hickox; Robyn Staniforth	Pamela Ayson; Hilary Back; Ian Black; Marnie Black; Tania Gelonesi; Melanie Marshall

== Results ==
Party	Votes	%	+/–	Seats	+/–
Labor	79,616	41.72	▲14.11	8	▲2
Liberal	60,390	31.64	▼6.19	7	0
Greens	17,369	9.10	0.00	1	0
Democrats	15,338	8.04	▲2.06	1	▲1
Osborne Independent Group	3,888	2.04	▼7.07	0	▼2
Independents	3,838	2.01	▼3.11	0	0
Dave Rugendyke	3,126	1.64	New	0	New
Nurses Good Government Party	2,763	1.45	New	0	New
Liberal Democratic Party	1,873	0.98	New	0	New
Gungahlin Equality Party	1,090	0.57	New	0	New
United Canberra Party	880	0.46	New	0	New
Canberra First Party	669	0.35	New	0	New
Total	190,840	100.00	–	17	–
Valid votes	190,840	96.03			
Invalid/blank votes	7,881	3.97	▼0.4		
Total votes	198,721	100.00	–		
Registered voters/turnout	218,615	90.90	▼0.9		

Results by electorate
	Brindabella			Ginninderra			Molonglo		
Party	Votes	%	Seats	Votes	%	Seats	Votes	%	Seats
Labor	24,891	44.0	3	23,852	42.8	2	30,873	39.3	3
Liberal	18,035	31.9	2	15,552	27.9	2	26,803	34.1	3
Greens	3,074	5.4	0	4,426	7.9	0	9,869	12.6	1
Democrats	3,938	7.0	0	5,408	9.7	1	5,992	7.6	0
Paul Osborne	3,888	6.9	0	—	—	—	—	—	—
Independent	895	1.6	0	1,249	2.2	0	1,694	2.2	0
Dave Rugendyke	—	—	—	3,126	5.6	0	—	—	—
Nurses Good Government Party	950	1.7	0	704	1.3	0	1,109	1.4	0
Liberal Democrats	297	0.5	0	1,045	1.9	0	531	0.7	0
Gungahlin Equality Party	—	—	—	346	0.6	0	744	1.0	0
United Canberra Party	636	1.1	0	—	—	—	244	0.3	0
Canberra First Party	—	—	—	—	—	—	669	0.9	0

Distribution of seats
Electorate	Seats held
Brindabella	
Ginninderra	
Molonglo	

Following a full count and distribution of preferences, Labor had obtained 41.7 per cent of the vote across the ACT, with the Liberals at 31.6 per cent, the Greens at 9.1 per cent, and the Democrats at 8.0 per cent. Swings were recorded towards Labor (+14.0 per cent) and the Democrats (+2.9 per cent); the Greens vote remained unchanged in percentage terms, and a strong swing against the Liberals (-6.2 per cent). With the retirement of Michael Moore and poor polling by both Paul Osborne and Dave Rugendyke, support for independent candidates collapsed. Following distribution of all preferences, the resultant outcome was a hung parliament, with Labor winning eight seats, the Liberals winning seven seats, and the Greens and Democrats winning one seat each. The ACT Electoral Commission determined and announced the election's final results on 5 November 2001. Labor, with a majority of seats in the Assembly, formed a minority government, with the support of the Greens and Democrats.

In Brindabella, Labor gained an additional one-seat to take their tally to three seats. The Liberals retained its two seats. Labor's Bill Wood and John Hargreaves retained their seats. Labor's Karin MacDonald defeated independent sitting member, Paul Osborne. For the Liberal Party, Government Minister Brendan Smyth and backbencher Steve Pratt were both re-elected.

Both Labor and Liberal retained its two seats in Ginninderra. The Democrats won its first seat in the Assembly, with Roslyn Dundas defeating independent Dave Rugendyke. Labor leader Jon Stanhope and Labor veteran member, Wayne Berry, were both re-elected. Bill Stefaniak was re-elected, with Vicki Dunne replacing the Liberal-truend-independent, Harold Hird as the second Liberal member. This was the only election the Democrats won a seat in the ACT Assembly, The 2001 election was also the last election until 2024 where a party other than labor-liberal-greens won a seat in the Assembly.

In seven-member Molonglo, the Liberals retained three seats; Labor picked up one additional seat, taking their representation from two seats to three; and the Greens retained one seat. Liberal leader, Gary Humphries and Speaker Greg Cornwell retained their seats. Helen Cross defeated Liberal colleague Jacqui Burke. For Labor, Ted Quinlan and Simon Corbell were re-elected. Katy Gallagher won the additional seat, following the retirement of long-serving independent member, Michael Moore. The Greens sitting member, Kerrie Tucker, was re-elected to the Assembly.

=== Electronic voting and counting system ===
==== Overview ====
The 2001 ACT election was a major milestone in the conduct of elections in Australia with the first use of electronic voting at polling places for parliamentary elections. This election also saw the introduction of electronic counting of all ballots for the first time in the ACT. Electronic voting and counting was introduced following the passing of the ACT Electoral Amendment Bill 2000 (No 2). This Bill allowed for electronic ballot papers, electronic capture of ballot information, electronic counting of ballots. Also covered were provisions allowing for the security of electronic voting and voting counting processes, handling of disputes, offences, publication of electronic voting statistics.

The electronic voting system used at the 2001 election was the first of its kind to be used for a parliamentary election in Australia. The system was based on the use of standard personal computers as voting terminals, with voters using a barcode to authenticate their votes. Voting terminals were linked to a server in each polling location using a secure local area network. No votes were taken or transmitted over a public network like the internet.

This was the first election which used electronic counting, which combines the counting of electronic votes and paper ballots. Votes were "captured" electronically in two ways: recorded directly by electors through the electronic voting system, and recorded by data entry operators who entered electors' preferences marked on paper ballots into a computer system. This data-entry method of converting handwritten ballot papers into computer-readable data was not an ACT first – similar systems have been used for recent elections for the Australian Senate and the upper houses in New South Wales, Western Australia and South Australia. However, adapting this system to the Robson Rotation method of printing variations of the ballot papers was an ACT innovation, used for the first time in Australia at the 2001 election.

==== 2001 statistics ====
A total of 16,559 electronic votes were recorded at four pre-poll centres across the Territory. On polling day, another four voting centres were equipped with electronic voting facilities. The proportion of electronic votes in relation to all votes counted increased was 8.3 per cent. The ACT Electoral Commission claims that interim results for 16,559 votes using the electronic voting system were available through the Commission's website by 7:15pm, 75 minutes after the close of polls on polling night. In a review of the electronic voting and counting system, following the 2001 election, the Commission recommended an expansion of the system for the 2004 ACT general election.

=== Claim for recount ===
Following the announcement of the election result in 2001, Harold Hird, a Liberal Party candidate in the electorate of Ginninderra, sought a recount of the votes in that electorate. Hird was 55 votes behind fellow Liberal Party candidate, Vicki Dunne, at the point at which one of the two candidates had to be excluded. Hird's request for a recount was rejected by both the Electoral Commissioner and, on appeal, the full Commission. In considering the request, the Commissioner and the full Commission had regard to the level of accuracy achieved by the data entry of paper ballots and the computer count. The Commission was satisfied that the level of accuracy was so high that a recount in any form could not have improved on the accuracy of the original count, and that there was no probability that the original count had indicated that the wrong candidates had been elected, given the margins between the winning and losing candidates.

== See also ==
- Members of the Australian Capital Territory Legislative Assembly, 2001-2004
- First Stanhope Ministry
- List of Australian Capital Territory elections
