= Tony De Domenico =

Australian politician

Tony De Domenico OAM

Deputy Chief Minister of the Australian Capital Territory
- In office 15 March 1995 – 9 January 1997
- Preceded by: David Lamont
- Succeeded by: Gary Humphries

Member of the Australian Capital Territory Legislative Assembly
- In office 15 February 1992 – 18 February 1995

Member of the Australian Capital Territory Legislative Assembly for Brindabella
- In office 18 February 1995 – 30 January 1997
- Succeeded by: Louise Littlewood

Personal details
- Born: Anthony Joseph De Domenico; 29 December 1950 (age 75) Alexandria, Egypt
- Party: Liberal

Anthony Joseph De Domenico OAM (born 29 December 1950) is an Australian politician and was a member of the Australian Capital Territory Legislative Assembly elected to the multi-member single constituency Assembly and later elected to represent the multi-member electorate of Brindabella for the Liberal Party.

De Dominico was born in Alexandria, Egypt, to Italian parents from southern Italy, then emigrated to Melbourne, Australia at the age of 4. He worked as a journalist, and unsuccessfully ran for election for Reservoir at the 1976 Victorian state election. He then moved to Canberra in 1981, where he was involved in Liberal Party politics.

De Domenico was initially elected the second ACT Legislative Assembly in 1992, and elected to represent Brindabella in the Assembly in 1995 general election. In 1995, De Domenico was accused of sexual harassment by a former staff member, but the ACT Discrimination Commissioner, Robin Burnett, dismissed the allegations as unsubstantiated. De Domenico resigned from the Assembly on 30 January 1997 to take up a position in the private sector and, during his parliamentary career, served as Deputy Chief Minister of the Australian Capital Territory, Minister for Industrial Relations, Minister for Urban Services and Deputy Leader of the Opposition.

Between 2000 and 2003, De Domenico was based in Milan, Italy, as a trade commissioner; and since 2004, has been executive director of the Victorian division of the Urban Development Institute of Australia. Prior to his election, De Domenico was president of the Canberra Chamber of Commerce.

De Domenico is currently chairman of the board of Bertocchi Smallgoods in Melbourne.
