= Peter Menegazzo =

Peter Menegazzo (1944? – 2 December 2005) was an Australian grain grower and cattle baron. Born to an immigrant family of fruit and vegetable growers, Menegazzo was said to be an intensely private person who rarely gave media interviews.

Menegazzo's father emigrated from Italy in 1925 to settle near Melbourne. Menegazzo helped build the family's fruit and vegetable merchant businesses across Australia. He later moved to Victoria, where he would become Australia's largest potato grower. In 1987, after a Cape holiday, Menegazzo moved his interests to beef and purchased several cattle stations, including Van Rook, Glen Ore and Warren Vale.

In 2003, Menegazzo came under media attention with his purchase of Stanbroke Pastoral Company, said to be the largest rural transaction in Australia's history. The chain of events surrounding that sale caused outrage in the beef industry who were attempting to gain control of the company. Partner in the Nebo Consortium (with Jack Cowin, founder of Hungry Jack's, and Queensland grazier Peter Hughes), Menegazzo became one of Australia's largest landholders, and the third-biggest cattle owner, with the $417.5 million plus debt sale, gaining 115,000 square kilometres (44,000 sq mi) and a herd of half a million cattle. Eight months after the sale, the Nebo group split over the management of the properties, and Menegazzo bought out the remaining half for a rumoured $340 million. He reaped a reported cash return of over A$500 million in less than a year.

Around 2:30 on the afternoon of 2 December 2005, Menegazzo, his wife Angela, pilot Anthony Gobel, and co-pilot Derek Mostyn were killed when the 23-year-old twin engine Piper Chieftain Rego VH-PYN they were flying on, crashed. The impact left a 3.5 kilometres (2.2 mi) path of wreckage about 25 kilometres (16 mi) west of Condobolin, New South Wales.

The ATSB report on the crash found:

- The aircraft was operating in the vicinity of thunderstorm cells.
- In circumstances that could not be determined, the aircraft's load limits were exceeded, causing structural failure of the airframe.

The Menegazzos were survived by three sons and a daughter.
