= Roslyn Dundas =

Australian politician

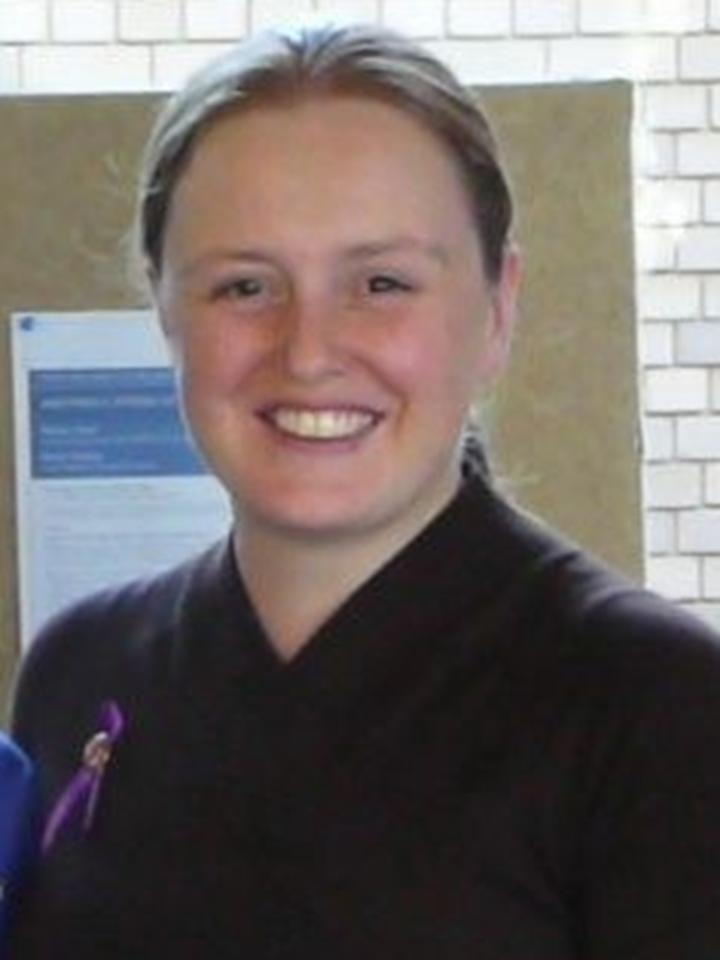
- Dundas in 2004

Member of the Australian Capital Territory Legislative Assembly
- In office 20 October 2001 – 16 October 2004 Serving with Berry, Dunne, Stanhope, Stefaniak
- Constituency: Ginninderra

Personal details
- Born: 28 July 1978 (age 48) Canberra, Australia
- Party: Democrats
- Education: ANU

Roslyn Dundas (born 28 July 1978) is a former Australian politician. She was an Australian Democrats member of the Australian Capital Territory Legislative Assembly from 2001 to 2004, when she was defeated in a bid for re-election. Until Kelly Vincent's election to the South Australian Legislative Council in 2010, Dundas was the youngest woman ever elected to an Australian parliament.

Dundas was born and raised in Canberra, and studied at Australian National University. While there, she became heavily involved in both student politics and community organisations, becoming the ACT Co-ordinator of the Young Women's Electoral Lobby in 1998. She served on the Management Committee of the Women's Centre for Health Matters, and on the General Committee of the ACT Council of Social Service.

In 2000, Dundas became the National Secretary of the Young Australian Democrats movement, and National Convenor of the Democrat Students. In the same year, she was also secretary of the university student body, a member of the party executive in the ACT, and the founding co-convenor of the Vida Women's Network – an attempt to form a Democrat version of EMILY's List Australia. During the year, she also served on the Women's Committee of the National Union of Students. In September 2000 she unsuccessfully ran for President of the Australian National University Students' Association, as the leader of a combined Democrat/Liberal election ticket.

Dundas worked as an organiser for the Community and Public Sector Union for several months in 2001, before gaining the top position on the Democrat ticket for the seat of Ginninderra in the ACT Legislative Assembly. She was subsequently elected, defeating conservative independent Dave Rugendyke. This made her the youngest woman elected to an Australian parliament, as well as the first Democrat to be elected in the ACT.

Once elected to the assembly, Dundas actively campaigned for increased government accountability, the environment, and women's rights. She supported a bill which liberalised the ACT's laws relating to abortion, and introduced a Private Member's Bill supporting the use of open source software. Roslyn Dundas stood in the left wing of the party, along with the likes of Senators Natasha Stott Despoja and Brian Greig. Over the next three years, she developed a significant public profile. She also preserved Jon Stanhope's Labor Party government by downgrading a no-confidence motion to a censure motion. However, in 2004 Dundas lost the seat to the Labor Party's Mary Porter.

After leaving the Legislative Assembly, Dundas worked as the ACT director of Ausdance. In late 2007 she became an advisor to the ACT Children and Young People's Commissioner. She took up the position of director of the ACT Council of Social Service in 2008. Dundas became the CEO of Ausdance in January 2013.
