= Steve Pratt =

Australian politician (born 1949)

Stephen George "Steve" Pratt (born 15 October 1949) is a former Australian military officer, aid worker and politician in the Australian Capital Territory Legislative Assembly. He wrote a book titled Duty of Care about his life experiences, including being imprisoned in Serbia while tending to the refugee crisis there in 1999.

== Early career ==
Pratt spent the late 1990s working for the foreign aid organisation CARE Australia. Prior to that, he had a 23-year career as a Military Officer in the Infantry of the Australian Army, seeing service throughout the Asia/Pacific region. He worked in dangerous front-line locations including Rwanda, Cambodia, Zaire, Iraq and the former Yugoslavia, as well as in Yemen, Jordan and Kenya, managing up to 32 international aid workers and 2000 local staff. In 1993 and 1994 Pratt worked as a senior manager in northern Iraq alongside the UN dealing with the humanitarian problems that followed the Gulf War. He and his colleagues came under fire from Ba’athist Fedayeen as well as religious extremists.

=== Iraq spying allegations ===
Allegations that Pratt used the cover of humanitarian work to undertake spying activities for the United Nations in Northern Iraq during 1992 and 1993 were published in The Sunday Telegraph of 11 April 1999. Reportedly, Pratt's activities became known to the Iraqi Government and a price was apparently placed on his Head. The allegations were later found to have been inadequately verified by the Australian Press Council. This accusation was attributed to media sensationalism while Pratt was being held in prison in Yugoslavia at the time.

=== Yugoslav spying allegations ===
In 1999 whilst evacuating from Yugoslavia, Pratt, fellow Australian Peter Wallace and Yugoslav Branko Jelen, were arrested by Yugoslav authorities and accused of spying for NATO and the Organization for Security and Co-operation in Europe. Pratt was forced at gunpoint to participate in a video confession, which was broadcast worldwide. After spending 5 months of a 12-year sentence in jail (including use of physical and emotional torture) in Yugoslavia, he was pardoned as innocent and released in September 1999 by former Serbian Leader, Slobodan Milosevic after appeals for clemency, just in time to return home for his daughter's birth.

An investigation in 2000 by journalist Graham Davis of the Australian SBS network suggested an arrangement between CARE Canada, part of the CARE Federation, and the Government of Canada, a NATO member, to recruit a team of people, including former military personnel, to help monitor events in Kosovo during the Yugoslav civil war. It was also revealed that former Australian Prime Minister Malcolm Fraser, who was then CARE Australia's Chairman, and Graham Davis had known of the agreements with CARE Canada and the Canadian Government during the time of Pratt's jailing, but had agreed not to reveal any of the details for fear of jeopardising the release of Pratt, Wallace, and Jelen.

== Political career ==
On 20 October 2001 Pratt was elected to the ACT Legislative Assembly as a Liberal MLA for the electorate of Brindabella. He was re-elected in the 2004 election. In September 2007, he became the Shadow Minister for Urban Services, Transport, and Emergency Services and Multicultural affairs. He was defeated in the 2008 Legislative Assembly election.

=== Political views ===
Pratt's political views are generally focused on law and order, ACT Government school closures, road safety, infrastructure needs in the ACT, the needs of the residents of Tharwa, including upgrades to the Tharwa Bridge, and opposition to the proposed gas-fired power station and data centre.

==== Disdain for public art and graffiti removal ====
Pratt gained notoriety for an ill-conceived campaign against graffiti and vandalism. In April 2007 he 'cleaned up' a legal mural that had been funded by a local disc (frisbee) golf club at Eddison Park, Woden, under a program intended to prevent unauthorised graffiti and vandalism. Despite being told by ACT Government officials prior to removing the mural the work was considered to be art, Pratt considered the work "obnoxious" and removed it anyway. The matter was later referred to the Australian Federal Police for further investigation.

On 15 August 2008, Pratt released a media release describing a new 11-metre tall outdoor wind activated kinetic sculpture commissioned by the ACT Government as 'unnecessary', and a potential traffic hazard for motorists. He stated that he had hoped the construction he had observed would have yielded another light pole or traffic sign, and not a piece of public art.

== Other achievements ==
Pratt has the following decorations: the National Medal, the Defence Force Service Medal, the Humanitarian Overseas Service Medal (clasps: Iraq; Great Lakes (Africa); Balkans), and the Australian Service Medal (South East Asia).

He is the author of Duty of Care, an account of CARE Australia's emergency overseas work 1993–1999 and his ordeal under detention, in the former Yugoslavia, during the NATO conflict.

In 2002, he obtained his Bachelor of Professional Studies (BPS) through the University of New England, specialising in "International Community Development" (ICD).

He is married to Samira and has two children, Haydon and Yasmina.
