= Paul Osborne =

Australian rugby league footballer, administrator & politician

Paul Anthony Osborne

Member of the ACT Legislative Assembly
- In office 18 February 1995 – 20 October 2001
- Constituency: Brindabella

Personal details
- Born: 30 September 1966 (age 60) Hurlstone Park, New South Wales
- Party: Independent; Osborne Independet Group (1997/98–99)
- Spouse: Maria Giertta
- Education: Christian Brothers' High School, Lewisham
- Rugby league career

Playing information
- Position: Prop
Club
Years	Team	Pld	T	G	FG	P
1986–91	St George Dragons	84	1	0	0	4
1992–94	Canberra Raiders	51	4	0	0	16
	Total	135	5	0	0	20

Paul Anthony Osborne (born 30 September 1966) is an Australian former professional rugby league footballer, administrator and politician. He played first-grade rugby league for the St George Dragons and Canberra Raiders before serving as a member of the Australian Capital Territory Legislative Assembly from 1995 until 2001. He was the chief executive officer of the Parramatta Eels in the National Rugby League from 2009 to 2011.

== Early and personal life ==
Osborne grew up in Hurlstone Park, New South Wales and was educated at Christian Brothers' High School, Lewisham. He was formerly a police detective. He is married to Maria Giertta, with whom he has two children. He also has nine children with his first wife, Sally Behn.

Osborne was the Captain of the Australian Schoolboy Rugby League Team in 1984.

== Rugby league football career ==
He was a member of the St George Dragons between 1986–91 and the Canberra Raiders from 1992–94. His form during his tenure at St George was inconsistent; he was sometimes considered a future star for the club and a captaincy candidate, while at other times he was considered a liability. He did, however, star in the Dragons team that won the mid-week 1988 Panasonic Cup. Osborne left the club at the end of Brian Smith's first year as head coach in 1991 to join Canberra, whose forwards' roster had been weakened after the 1991 salary cap investigation led to the Raiders having to shed several players.

In switching clubs, Osborne was unlucky in that Canberra had made the grand final in four of his last five years at St George, and then the Dragons made the grand final in each of the two seasons following his move to the nation’s capital. Although he was a regular first-grader in his first two seasons with the Raiders, he injured his foot early in 1994 and thus did not play much first grade that season. Not expecting to be selected for any post-season matches, and unsigned for the following year, he had organised an immediate release from finals-bound Canberra, and had been ready to fly to England to finish his career there.

In the Raiders’ 1994 preliminary final victory over North Sydney, John Lomax was sent off and subsequently suspended, meaning Lomax was unavailable for the grand final. Canberra coach Tim Sheens felt that the reserve forwards he had been using in the finals, Brett Hetherington and David Westley, would lose their impact if they started the match, so he literally called Osborne back from the airport for the opportunity to play one last game, in the grand final. In a career-best performance, Osborne laid on two offloads which led directly to tries in the early stages of the decider, playing an important role as Canberra claimed the 1994 Winfield Cup, and giving him a dream ending to his playing days.

Missing the flight to England had terminated his contractual agreements in the UK, so he was left without a club for 1995. Osborne consequently joined the local Canberra competition, and later got involved in local politics.

== Political career ==
Osborne Independent Group
- Leader: Paul Osborne
- Founder: Paul Osborne
- Founded: 1997/98
- Dissolved: 15 February 1999 (deregistered)
- Legislative Assembly: 2 / 17 (1998)

Osborne was elected to the ACT Legislative Assembly as an independent representative for the electorate of Brindabella in 1995 on a socially conservative platform. Prior to the 1998 general election, Osborne formed a group called the Osborne Independents Group and ran two candidates in each of the three seats. Osborne was re-elected and Dave Rugendyke, a former police officer, won a seat in the Assembly, representing Ginninderra. The Osborne Independent Group ran on a strong anti-abortion ticket with stated objectives of blocking efforts to legalise euthanasia and decriminalise abortion. However, on taking up his seat in the Assembly, Rugendyke chose not to sit with Osborne, opting instead to sit as an independent in the Assembly. Less than a year later, at the request of the party, the ACT Electoral Commission deregistered the Osborne Independent Group on 15 February 1999. Osborne and Rugendyke sat in the Assembly as independents from that date.

In 1995, with the support of Osborne and Michael Moore, another independent, Liberal leader, Kate Carnell, formed a minority government. Moore later went on to serve as an independent Minister for Health in the Carnell-led government. In 1998, with support of Rugendyke, Osborne introduced an anti-abortion bill, requiring that more information be provided to women considering the procedure and that there be a 72-hour cooling-off period between it being approved and carried out. His move was vehemently but unsuccessfully opposed by the Health Minister, Moore. The Bill, while consistent with Osborne's Catholic beliefs, damaged his popularity among the suburban voters who had been his chief supporters. (Abortion was decriminalised and the legislation repealed in 2002).

Osborne voted against the 2000 budget in a successful attempt to stop the opening of a supervised injecting room. Although the injecting room had the support of a majority of the Assembly members, Osborne's support was needed to approve the funding in the budget. A new budget without funding for the injecting room was presented to the Assembly soon after and it was passed with Osborne's support.

In late 2000, Labor gave notice of an intention to move a no confidence vote against Carnell over the controversial Bruce Stadium affair. The Assembly adjourned for seven days and, despite her attempts to secure support from Osborne, Carnell was forced to resign as Chief Minister before the vote was put to the Assembly. She was replaced by Gary Humphries. Osborne had a crucial role in determining Carnell's future, initially proposing an early election (which was outside the provisions of the ACT Constitution) to resolve the lack of confidence in Carnell.

In 2001, Osborne and Rugendyke defended their respective seats, but this time, on separate tickets. Neither man was re-elected.

In July 2004, the Canberra Times claimed that Osborne was considering running for that year's ACT election with the Liberal Party, but he did not end up running. Osborne later returned to the Canberra Raiders to work for the club as a community-relations officer for a time after leaving politics.

== Life after politics ==
In 2005, he was appointed as the CEO of the National Rugby League's Player Manager Accreditation Program. He was also a match-day commentator on the ABC's rugby league coverage.

In October 2008, he took six NRL players, Todd Carney, Jarrad Hickey, Nathan Hindmarsh, Todd Payten, Justin Poore and Jared Waerea-Hargreaves, to Rwanda to work in the Village of Hope for Hope. They worked in the village building houses for widows and orphans. They also visited the famed mountain gorillas, with News Limited and Fox Sports providing extended coverage of the trip. All the players reported how much the trip had affected them and how far the country had come since the 1994 genocide. Osborne returned to Rwanda in 2009 with six Parramatta Eels players, Joe Galuvao, Matt Keating, Tim Mannah, Joseph Paulo, Justin Poore and Joel Reddy. They worked in the same village and also made the trip to the border of Rwanda and the Congo at the Volcanoes National Park to visit the mountain gorillas.

Midway through the 2009 NRL season, Parramatta Eels chief executive Denis Fitzgerald was replaced by Osborne. He then oversaw the troubled club's rise to the grand final, with the Eels winning seven regular-season matches in a row to make the finals and then winning three straight finals to appear in the decider against the Melbourne Storm. The Eels, under Osborne, broke the record for the biggest crowd at a match outside of a grand final when 75,000 people attended their preliminary final against the Canterbury Bulldogs. His friendship with rugby union convert Timana Tahu was later pivotal in Tahu returning to the Eels from the 15-man code for the 2010 NRL season.

On 15 November 2011, Osborne announced that he would no longer be Parramatta’s chief executive after Christmas because "a working relationship between [him] and the club's major naming rights sponsor Pirtek is no longer tenable".
