= Vicki Dunne =

Australian politician

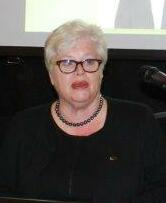

6th Speaker of the ACT Legislative Assembly
- In office 6 November 2012 – 31 October 2016
- Deputy: Mary Porter
- Preceded by: Shane Rattenbury
- Succeeded by: Joy Burch

Member of the Australian Capital Territory Legislative Assembly for Ginninderra
- In office 20 October 2001 – 17 October 2020
- Preceded by: Harold Hird
- Succeeded by: Peter Cain

Personal details
- Born: 25 December 1956 (age 69) Lismore, New South Wales
- Party: Liberal Party

Vicki Ann Dunne (born 25 December 1956) is an Australian politician who was a member of the unicameral Australian Capital Territory Legislative Assembly, from 2001 to 2020, representing the electoral district of Ginninderra for the Liberal Party.

Dunne was first elected at the 2001 ACT general election, defeating prominent sitting member and fellow Liberal, Harold Hird, by just 55 votes, after distribution of preferences. Following the announcement of the election result in 2001, Hird sought a recount of the votes in the electorate of Ginninderra. Hird's request for a recount was rejected by both the Electoral Commissioner and, on appeal, the full ACT Electoral Commission. In considering the request, the Commissioner and the full Commission had regard to the level of accuracy achieved by the data entry of paper ballots and the computer count. The Commission was satisfied that the level of accuracy was so high that a recount in any form could not have improved on the accuracy of the original count, and that there was no probability that the original count had indicated that the wrong candidates had been elected, given the margins between the winning and losing candidates.

Prior to entering the Assembly, Dunne had served on the staff of the then Chief Minister of the ACT, Gary Humphries. Dunne held the position of Speaker of the Australian Capital Territory Legislative Assembly from 2012 to 2016. Although a coalition of Labour and Greens had been formed after the ACT election of 2012, the sole Green MP Shane Rattenbury had also announced to support the Liberal Party's candidate for the Speaker post, allowing Dunne to be elected. Labour MP Mary Porter was elected her deputy.

Dunne has been associated with the Commonwealth Parliamentary Association (CPA) for several years including as one of the Regional Representatives on the CPA Executive Committee for the CPA Australia Region between 2013 and 2015 and as the CPA Treasurer between 2016 and 2019.

Dunne did not stand for re-election to the ACT parliament in October 2020.

Australian Capital Territory Legislative Assembly
Preceded by Shane Rattenbury	Speaker of the ACT Legislative Assembly; 2012–2016	Succeeded by Joy Burch
