= Marion Reilly =

Australian politician

Marion Reilly is an Australian politician and was a member of the Australian Capital Territory Legislative Assembly representing the multi-member single electorate of Molonglo for the Labor Party. Reilly was elected following a recount of ballot papers to fill a casual vacancy resulting from the resignation of Terry Connolly in the third ACT Legislative Assembly. Reilly was sworn into the Assembly on 26 March 1996. Reilly contested the 1998 ACT general election, however, was unsuccessful in retaining her seat. She contested the results of the 2001 ACT general election, and was once again unsuccessful in being elected to the Assembly.

Prior to entering politics, Reilly was a teacher. She was born in Sydney and grew up in Brisbane, before moving to South Australia and then the Northern Territory. Reilly moved to Canberra in 1985 and was a senior manager in the Australian Public Service in areas of aged care, indigenous services, and housing.

Reilly is a Member of the ACT Health Council, and is Deputy Chairperson of the ACT Ministerial Advisory Council on Ageing. She has served on the board of the YWCA of Canberra from 2002 to 2007; on the Council of the University of Canberra from 2004 to 2008; and on the Board of ACT Shelter during 2006.
