= Dave Rugendyke =

Australian politician

David Ross Rugendyke (born 3 April 1953) is an Australian politician, and was a member of the Australian Capital Territory Legislative Assembly for the multi-member electorate of Ginninderra.

Prior to entering politics, Rugendyke was a police officer. He was elected on the Osborne Independent Group ticket at the 1998 general election, but sat in the Assembly as an independent. In his maiden speech, Rugendyke said his political focus was on social justice and welfare, rather than the anti-gay marriage and anti-abortion platform of his running mate Paul Osborne.

Rugendyke is best known for the part he played in ousting then Chief Minister, Kate Carnell, for failing to properly appropriate funds for the construction of Bruce Stadium. He sought re-election at the 2001 general election on his own ticket, but was unsuccessful. David and his wife received the Order of Australia medal in 2023 for their years of foster care work. David was also awarded a long service Fire Medal in 2024 for his work during the 2019 Cobargo bushfire; this medal was presented by Mr. Brian Ayliffe.
