= Gary Humphries =

Australian politician (born 1958)

Gary Humphries AO
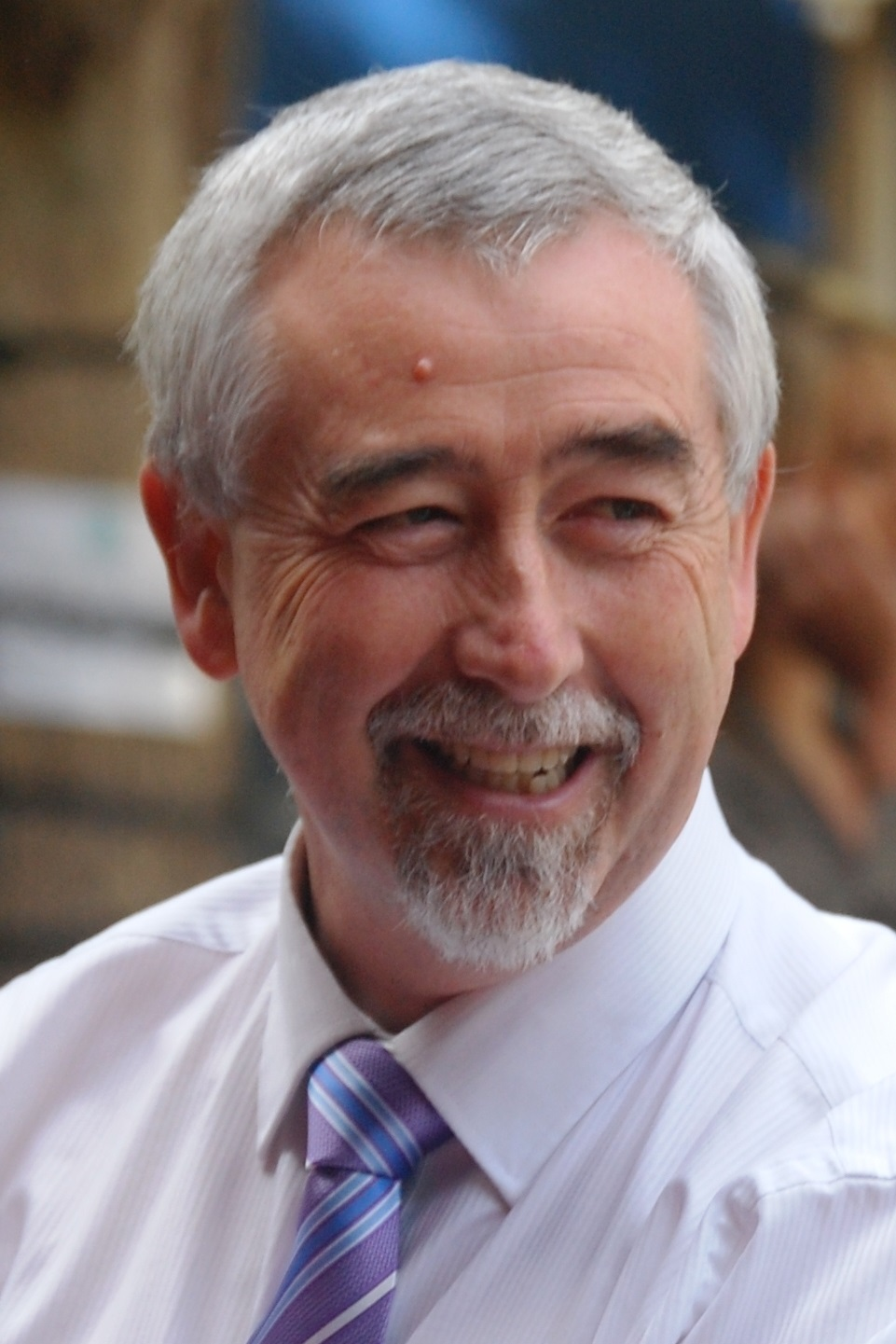
- Humphries in 2010

4th Chief Minister of the Australian Capital Territory Elections: 2001
- In office 18 October 2000 – 5 November 2001
- Preceded by: Kate Carnell
- Succeeded by: Jon Stanhope

Senator for the Australian Capital Territory
- In office 18 February 2003 – 6 September 2013
- Preceded by: Margaret Reid
- Succeeded by: Zed Seselja

Leader of the Opposition in the Australian Capital Territory
- In office 21 June 1991 – 22 July 1991
- Preceded by: Craig Duby
- Succeeded by: Trevor Kaine
- In office 12 November 2001 – 25 November 2002
- Preceded by: Jon Stanhope
- Succeeded by: Brendan Smyth

Member of the ACT Legislative Assembly
- In office 4 March 1989 – 18 February 1995 Serving with Berry, Collaery/Carnell, Duby/Cornwell, Follett, Grassby, Jensen/De Domenico, Kaine, Kinloch/Ellis, Maher/Lamont, Moore, Nolan/McRae, Prowse/Westende/Szuty, Stefaniak, Stevenson, Whalan/Connolly, Wood
- Succeeded by: multi-member multiple constituencies
- In office 18 February 1995 – 25 November 2002 Serving with Follett/Corbell, Connolly/Reilly/Quinlan, Carnell/Burke/Quinlan, Cornwell, Tucker, Moore/Cross
- Preceded by: multi-member single constituency
- Succeeded by: Jacqui Burke
- Constituency: Molonglo

Personal details
- Party: Liberal (until 2014; since 2020)
- Education: Australian National University
- Profession: Solicitor
- Cabinet: Humphries shadow ministry I; Humphries ministry; Humphries shadow ministry II

Gary John Joseph Humphries AO (born 6 July 1958) is an Australian former politician who served as the 4th Chief Minister of the Australian Capital Territory from 2000 to 2001. He was later a member of the Australian Senate representing the Australian Capital Territory for the Liberal Party of Australia from 2003 to 2013.

Humphries was a member of the Australian Capital Territory Legislative Assembly from its inception in 1989 until 2003, serving first an MLA under the initial undivided structure and later for the five-member electorate of Molonglo.

As of 2025, he is the most recent Liberal ACT Chief Minister.

== Early career ==
Humphries was born in Sydney in 1958 and was educated at St Patrick's College, Strathfield before graduating from the Australian National University in Canberra with a Bachelor of Arts and a Bachelor of Laws. In 1977 he was elected President of the ANU Students' Association. He worked as a solicitor, a legal office in the ACT Administration, prior to self-government, and political advisor to Senator Amanda Vanstone.

== Political career ==
=== Australian Capital Territory politics ===
Humphries was elected to the unicameral ACT Legislative Assembly at the 1989 election. This election formed the first self-government of the Australian Capital Territory. Humphries represented the Liberal Party in a multi-member electorate covering the whole of the ACT. Humphries was re-elected at the 1992 (again in a single electorate), and at the 1995, 1998, and 2001 elections, in the multi-member electorate of Molonglo.

Humphries variously served in a range of shadow ministerial roles in the Kaine and Carnell oppositions. In late 1989, when Trevor Kaine became the Chief Minister in a hung parliament, Humphries was appointed Minister for Health, Education, and the Arts. He held this position until the Labor Party led by Rosemary Follett regained government in mid-1991. Humphries became the Leader of the Opposition for a short time in 1991, and again in 2001–02.

In 1995, when Carnell became the Chief Minister, Humphries was appointed to the following portfolios:

- Minister for Arts and Heritage; Environment, Land and Planning; Police and Emergency Services; and Fair Trading (1995–1998)
- Attorney-General (1995–2000)
- Deputy Chief Minister (1997–2000)
- Minister for Health and Community Care (1998)
- Minister Assisting the Treasurer (1998–1999)
- Treasurer (1999–2001)

In 2000, Humphries succeeded Carnell as Chief Minister, retaining the portfolio of Treasurer. At the 2001 election, the Liberal government lost office. The Australian Labor Party, led by Jon Stanhope formed Government with the support of the ACT Greens and Democrats.

=== Federal politics ===
In December 2002, Humphries was elected by the party membership as nominee to fill a forthcoming casual vacancy in the Senate caused by the announced resignation of Margaret Reid. Reid formally resigned on 14 February 2003, and Humphries was elected by the ACT Legislative Assembly on 18 February to fill the casual vacancy. The appointment made him the 500th person to serve in the Senate.

In 2004 there was speculation the Liberals would reject his preselection for the Senate spot, but he won the ballot unopposed 97 votes to 43 votes (43 people voted for 'none of the above'). Humphries was re-elected at the 2004 federal election with 1.1361 quotas. Unopposed in the pre-selection ballot held on 26 June 2007, Humphries was chosen to contest the election later that year, and was again re-elected to the Senate at the 2007 federal election, receiving 1.03 quotas. Humphries' Senate seat was targeted by online activist organisation GetUp, as part of a campaign to prevent any one political party from having a majority of the seats in the federal upper house. The profile of the campaign was bolstered by polling that suggested that, for the first time, a Liberal Senator might struggle to retain their seat in the ACT.

Humphries was the first Liberal senator to vote against the Howard Government in its 11.5 years in office, when he voted to reverse the Federal Government's ban on the ACT's civil unions law in the Senate, claiming that the Commonwealth should not be able to automatically overturn ACT legislation.

Humphries has served on several Australian Senate committees, including the Select Committee on Mental Health (2005–2006). In 2006, he became Chairman of the Standing Committee on Community Affairs. and is currently the Deputy Chair of the Senate Legal and Constitutional Affairs—Legislation Committee and Chair of the Privileges—Standing Committee with an active involvement in many others.

In 2009, after the election of Tony Abbott as the Leader of the Opposition, Humphries was promoted to the front bench as the Shadow Parliamentary Secretary for Families, Housing and Human Services and Shadow Parliamentary Secretary for Citizenship. He was re-elected at the 2010 federal election, with 1.0118 quotas and was retained on the Opposition frontbench as Shadow Parliamentary Secretary to the Shadow Attorney-General and Shadow Parliamentary Secretary for Defence Materiel in September 2010.

On 23 February 2013 Humphries lost Liberal pre-selection to one of his successors as ACT Liberal Leader, Zed Seselja. This happened with much controversy, in particular over party members, including many prominent ones, being barred from voting. The result was 114 (Seselja) to 84 (Humphries), or 58% to 42%. A re-election was held on 27 March 2013 with a higher membership turnout and vote, but it failed to overturn the result. The vote, 168-138 or 55%-45%, was closer than the first one.

Humphries' term as a senator came to end on 6 September 2013, the day before the 2013 election.

There was much bitterness and controversy in the aftermath of the Senate preselection result. For example, Humphries refused to attend a dinner that the party executive held for him, because of the way that it had been organised. In May 2014 Humphries was stripped of the Margaret Reid Award for distinguished service, a noteworthy party presentation, by the party's management committee. This was for comments critical of the party and some of its members, such as Opposition Leader Jeremy Hanson, who became Opposition leader after Seselja replaced Humphries as a Senator. One critique in particular, about the Canberra Liberals losing touch with the ACT community, raised the committee's ire, and drew a public rebuke from Hanson.

A faction called the Menzies Group was organised in response to the preselection result and the perception that the far right of the Canberra Liberals was running the party. Humphries was involved in setting up this faction. It was active for a time, but now seems to have receded.

On 14 December 2014, Humphries quit the Canberra Liberal Party. In an email, he told supporters that the Canberra Liberal Party in its current state was, amongst other things, undemocratic, still out of touch with the ACT community, unable to control its finances, and dominated by its far right. Hanson again publicly rebuked Humphries.

Humpries rejoined the party in 2020. He endorsed James Daniels for Brindabella at the 2024 territory election.

== Later career ==
Upon leaving the Senate, Gary Humphries took on a role as a lobbyist with 1st State Government and Corporate Relations. Since 2014 Humphries has been a regular contributor to the Canberra-based RiotACT and to the Fairfax press, particularly The Canberra Times.

Humphries was appointed Chair of the Anzac Centenary Public Fund Board in March 2014.

He was appointed a Deputy President of the Administrative Appeals Tribunal from January 2015. He left the Administrative Appeals Tribunal in 2020.

== See also ==
- Humphries Ministry

Political offices
Preceded by Craig Duby	Opposition Leader of the Australian Capital Territory; 1991	Succeeded by Trevor Kaine
Preceded by Kate Carnell	Chief Minister of the Australian Capital Territory; 2000–2001	Succeeded by Jon Stanhope
Preceded by Jon Stanhope	Opposition Leader of the Australian Capital Territory; 2001–2002	Succeeded by Brendan Smyth
Australian Capital Territory Legislative Assembly
New title	Member of the ACT Legislative Assembly; 1989–1995; Served alongside: Berry, Collaery/Carnell, Duby/Cornwell, Follett, Grassby, Jensen/De Domenico, Kaine, Kinloch/Ellis, Maher/Lamont, Moore, Nolan/McRae, Prowse/Westende/Szuty, Stefaniak, Stevenson, Whalan/Connolly, Wood	Multi-member multiple constituencies
New title	Member for Molonglo; 1995–2002; Served alongside: Follett/Corbell, Connolly/Reilly/Quinlan, Carnell/Burke/Quinlan, Cornwell, Tucker, Moore/Cross	Succeeded by Jacqui Burke
Parliament of Australia
Preceded by Margaret Reid	Senator for the Australian Capital Territory; 2003–2013; Served alongside: Kate Lundy	Succeeded by Zed Seselja
