= Greg Cornwell =

Australian politician (1938–2025)

Greg Cornwell AM

3rd Speaker of the Australian Capital Territory Legislative Assembly
- In office 9 March 1995 – 12 November 2001
- Preceded by: Roberta McRae
- Succeeded by: Wayne Berry

Member of the ACT Legislative Assembly
- In office 15 February 1992 – 16 October 2004
- Succeeded by: Zed Seselja
- Constituency: Molonglo

Member of the ACT House of Assembly
- In office June 1975 – 1986
- Constituency: Fraser

Personal details
- Born: 19 June 1938
- Died: 22 June 2025 (aged 87)
- Party: Liberal Party

Gregory Gane Cornwell AM (19 June 1938 – 22 June 2025) was an Australian politician. He was a member of the unicameral Australian Capital Territory Legislative Assembly elected to the multi-member single-constituency Assembly and later elected to represent the multi-member electorate of Molonglo for the Liberal Party.

Cornwell also served in the elected ACT House of Assembly (a predecessor to the ACT Legislative Assembly), representing the electoral district of Fraser, from 1975 until 1986 for the Liberal Party.

Cornwell was initially elected to the second ACT Legislative Assembly in 1992, elected to represent Molonglo in the Assembly in 1995, 1998 and 2001 general elections. Cornwell did not contest the 2004 ACT general election. During the time when the government was led by his party, Cornwell served as Speaker of the Australian Capital Territory Legislative Assembly from 1995 to 2001.

Cornwell died on 22 June 2025, at the age of 87.

Political offices
Preceded by Roberta McRae	Speaker of the Australian Capital Territory Legislative Assembly; 1995–2001	Succeeded by Wayne Berry
