= Jacqui Burke =

Australian politician

Jacqui Burke (born 22 May 1953) is an Australian politician and was a member of the Australian Capital Territory Legislative Assembly representing the electorate of Molonglo for the Liberal Party.

== Legislative career ==
She was sworn into the ACT Legislative Assembly on 13 February 2001 to fill a casual vacancy created following the resignation of Kate Carnell. Burke later contested the 2001 election, but was unsuccessful.

Following the resignation of Gary Humphries, Burke was again sworn into the ACT Legislative Assembly on 18 February 2003. She successfully contested the 2004 ACT general election. She was later voted out of office in the 2008 ACT general election.
