= Ted Quinlan =

Australian politician

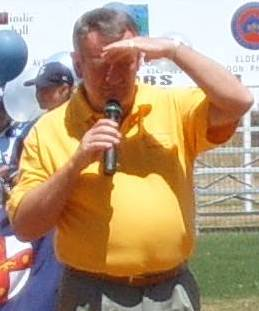
Mr Quinlan speaks at the opening of the 2006 u16 Girls' National Softball Championships in Canberra.

Edward Andrew John Quinlan AM (born 7 August 1942) is a former Australian politician. He was a Labor Party member of the Australian Capital Territory Legislative Assembly from 1998 to 2006, representing the district of Molonglo.

Quinlan was elected at the 1998 election, when Labor was soundly defeated by the Liberal Party under popular Chief Minister Kate Carnell. He initially hoped to run for the leadership after the subsequent resignation of Wayne Berry as leader, but allowed Jon Stanhope to nominate uncontested when it became clear Stanhope had the numbers. He nevertheless became a senior figure in the party, and when it won government under Stanhope at the 2001 election, he served as Deputy Chief Minister and Treasurer. He served in these portfolios until March 2006, when he resigned from the Assembly for health reasons.

Quinlan is the only former ACT Treasurer who is not also a former Chief Minister.
