= Kerrie Tucker =

Australian politician (born 1948)

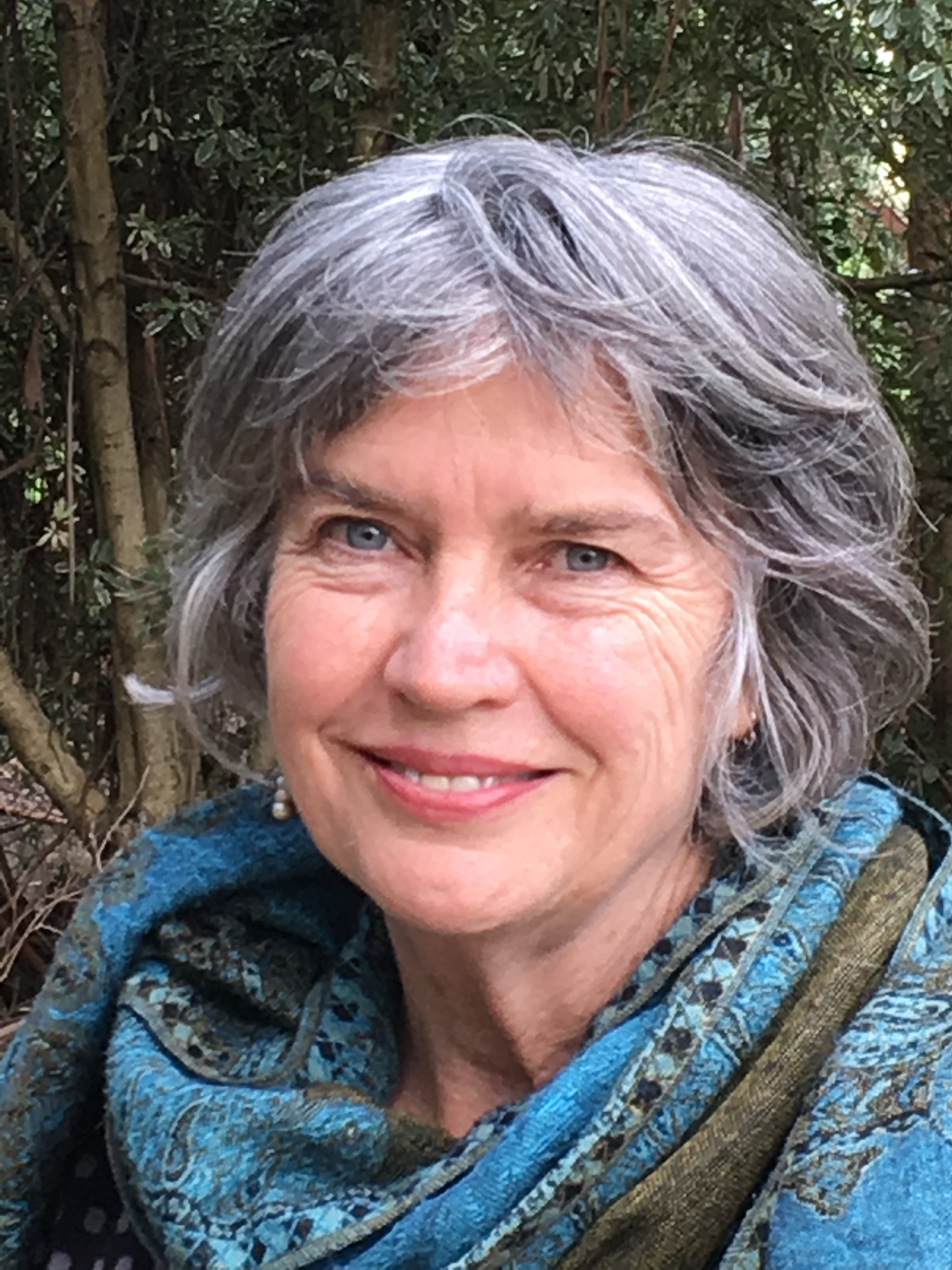

Member of ACT Legislative Assembly
- In office 18 February 1995 – 16 October 2004
- Constituency: Molonglo

Personal details
- Born: 15 September 1948 (age 77)
- Party: ACT Greens
- Occupation: Environmental and human rights activist

Kerrie Robyn Tucker (born 15 September 1948) is a former Australian politician and activist for the environment and human rights who was a member of the unicameral Australian Capital Territory Legislative Assembly representing the multi-member electorate of Molonglo for the ACT Greens between 1995 and 2001. Tucker was an unsuccessful candidate for election to the Australian Senate representing the Australian Capital Territory (ACT) for the Australian Greens at the 1993, 2004, and 2007 federal elections.

== Early years ==
Prior to entering politics, Tucker was employed by the Canberra and South East Region Environment Centre to work in the library and edit the Bogong magazine. She was a founding member of ACT Greens.

== Political career ==
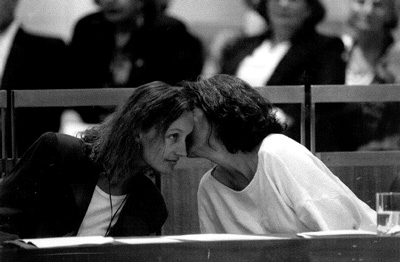
Tucker (right) with fellow MLA Lucy Horodny

Tucker was elected to the ACT Legislative Assembly, representing the Molonglo electorate for the ACT Greens in 1995, and was re-elected in 1998 and 2001. During her term as a Member of the ACT Legislative Assembly, Tucker used her staffing allowance to employ part-time staff, who shared her political views. In 1999–2000, her office produced more legislation and amendments than any other non-government office. Her term was marked by a progressive social agenda, including advocating for public housing, pro-choice and same-sex anti-discrimination laws, review of competition policy, substance abuse and progressive drug reform, and increasing the size of the Assembly from 17 members to 21 members.

Tucker resigned her seat one month before the 2004 ACT general election in order to contest the 2004 federal election.

She ran for election to the Australian Senate representing the Australian Capital Territory for the Australian Greens at the 1993 federal election, gaining 5.9% of the primary vote; falling well short of a quota. Tucker ran again at the 2004 federal election gaining 16.4% of the primary vote, and was again unsuccessful. Tucker ran again for the Senate at the 2007 federal election gaining 21.5% of the primary vote, and was unsuccessful in gaining election, amidst significant media speculation that Tucker would defeat sitting Liberal Senator, Gary Humphries. Humphries had earlier been ACT Chief Minister and ironically Tucker was among the MLAs holding the balance of power after the 2001 election who voted to oust Humphries as Chief Minister.

== Career post-politics ==
Since 2004, Tucker has worked as the Executive Officer of ACT Shelter, advocating for the needs of people experiencing homelessness and housing stress. In 2005 and 2006, she was co-chair of Anti-Poverty Week in the ACT and continues to contribute to the community on a voluntary basis through her work as an individual member of the ACT Collaboration. Tucker works part-time with the progressive left wing think tank, The Australia Institute.
