= Harold Hird =

Australian politician

Member of the ACT Legislative Assembly
- In office 18 February 1995 – 20 October 2001
- Succeeded by: Vicki Dunne
- Constituency: Ginninderra

Member of the ACT House of Assembly
- In office June 1975 – 1986
- Constituency: Fraser

Personal details
- Born: 24 February 1942 (age 84)
- Party: Independent (until 1986, 1989–1992, since 2005)
- Other political affiliations: Liberal Party (1986–1989, 1995–2004); Better Management Team (1992); Harold Hird Independents (2004–2005)

Harold James Hird (born 24 February 1942) is an Australian former politician who was a member of the unicameral Australian Capital Territory Legislative Assembly representing the electorate of Ginninderra for the Liberal Party from 1995 to 2001. Hird also served in the elected ACT House of Assembly (a predecessor to the ACT Legislative Assembly), representing the electoral district of Fraser, from 1975 until 1986 as an independent. He was the Speaker from 1982 to 1986.

== Territory politics ==
Prior to becoming the ACT Legislative Assembly, the body was an advisory body known as the Legislative Assembly from 1975 to 1979 and the House of Assembly from 1979 to 1986. Hird was a member throughout this period, except for a brief period at the end of 1975 when he resigned to be a candidate in the 1975 Federal election. Having been unsuccessful in that election, he was reappointed to the Assembly early in 1976.

Hird's resignation in 1975 was in order to stand as the running mate for former Liberal Prime Minister John Gorton's attempt to win an ACT Senate seat as an independent. Prior to election day, Hird announced that he was not running with Gorton, due to Gorton being too close to the Liberal Movement, but the nominations had been accepted as a group, and on election day Gorton and Hird were listed together.

During the last term of the House of Assembly, from 1982 to 1986, Hird served as Speaker. At the end of the House of Assembly's term, he applied to join the Liberal Party.

The House of Assembly was dissolved in 1986 in advance of the establishment of the Legislative Assembly in 1989. Hird ran for election in the 1989 general election as an independent candidate, but he was unsuccessful. Hird ran again, leading a ticket called 'The Better Management – An Independent Team', with seven other candidates in 1992 (which also included former MHA Bev Cains and former Advisory Council member Alan Fitzgerald), and was again unsuccessful. On his third attempt running for the ACT Legislative Assembly, Hird was successful in 1995, this time as a candidate for the Liberal Party.

At the request of the ACT Chief Minister, in 1996 the ACT Auditor General completed an inquiry that provided guidelines to the Territory government for commercial dealings with companies, partnerships or individuals who are partners of family members of Members of the Assembly. The inquiry came about due to an auction of taxi plates that yielded $0.57m below budget expectation. The auctioneer for the plates was Harold Hird and Associates. The Auditor-General found that the selection of the auctioneer followed due process. The Auditor-General also found that as there were no established guidelines for Ministers, Members of the Assembly, nor public servants in how to act in such matters. Recommendations were made to establish a Code of Conduct.

Hird was re-elected at the 1998 general election. At the 2001 general election, Hird ran again for the Liberal Party but was unsuccessful in retaining his seat for the party. Vicki Dunne was elected as the second Liberal candidate for Ginninderra. Following the announcement of the election result in 2001, Hird sought a recount of the votes in the electorate of Ginninderra. Hird was 55 votes behind fellow Liberal Party candidate, Dunne, at the point at which one of the two candidates had to be excluded. Hird's request for a recount was rejected by both the Electoral Commissioner and, on appeal, the full ACT Electoral Commission. In considering the request, the Commissioner and the full commission had regard to the level of accuracy achieved by the data entry of paper ballots and the computer count. The commission was satisfied that the level of accuracy was so high that a recount in any form could not have improved on the accuracy of the original count and that there was no probability that the original count had indicated that the wrong candidates had been elected, given the margins between the winning and losing candidates.

At the 2004 ACT general election, Hird ran on his own ticket, called the 'Harold Hird Independents'. He ran again as an independent at the 2008 ACT general election. On both occasions, he was unsuccessful in being elected. In 2005, the ACT Electoral Commissioner cancelled the party's registration at the request of the Secretary of the Harold Hird Independent Group.
