= Molonglo electorate =

Electorate of the Australian Capital Territory

Molonglo Australian Capital Territory—Legislative Assembly
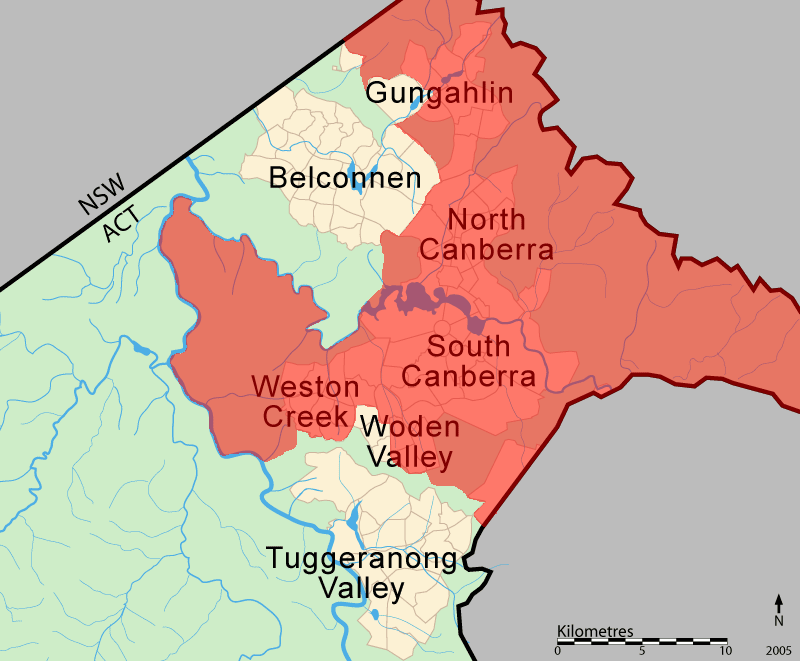
- Location of the electorate in the Canberra region
- Territory: Australian Capital Territory
- Created: 1995
- Abolished: 2016
- Namesake: Molonglo River
- Electors: 108,194 (2012)
Electorates around Molonglo:
Goulburn (NSW)	Goulburn (NSW)	Monaro (NSW)
Ginninderra	Molonglo	Monaro (NSW)
Brindabella	Brindabella	Monaro (NSW)

The Molonglo electorate was one of the three electorates for the unicameral 17-member Australian Capital Territory Legislative Assembly between 1995 and 2016. It had seven seats, and was the largest of the three electorates in terms of population.

== History ==
Molonglo was created in 1995, when the three-electorate, Hare-Clark electoral system was first introduced for the Australian Capital Territory (ACT). Prior to 1995, a multi-member single constituency existed for the whole of the ACT. The name "Molonglo" is derived from an Aboriginal word meaning "like the sound of thunder". It is the name of the river that flows through the central electorate, which was dammed to form Lake Burley Griffin, one of the focal points of Canberra and of the central electorate.

== Location ==
The Molonglo electorate consisted of the town centres of North Canberra, South Canberra, Weston Creek, and Woden (except for the suburbs of Chifley, Pearce and Torrens), and Gungahlin (except for the suburb of Nicholls). It also includes the parts of the ACT to the north and east of Canberra. Its western boundary was the Murrumbidgee River.

Molonglo was abolished in 2016, with its constituents transferred between each of three new electorates: Kurrajong, and parts of Murrumbidgee and Yerrabi.

== Members ==
Year	Member	Party	Member	Party	Member	Party	Member	Party	Member	Party	Member	Party	Member	Party
1995	Rosemary Follett	Labor	Terry Connolly	Labor	Michael Moore	Independent	Kerrie Tucker	Greens	Kate Carnell	Liberal	Gary Humphries	Liberal	Greg Cornwell	Liberal
1996^{1,2}	Simon Corbell	Labor	Marion Reilly	Labor	Michael Moore	Independent	Kerrie Tucker	Greens	Kate Carnell	Liberal	Gary Humphries	Liberal	Greg Cornwell	Liberal
1998	Simon Corbell	Labor	Ted Quinlan	Labor	Michael Moore	Independent	Kerrie Tucker	Greens	Kate Carnell	Liberal	Gary Humphries	Liberal	Greg Cornwell	Liberal
2001^{3}	Simon Corbell	Labor	Ted Quinlan	Labor	Michael Moore	Independent	Kerrie Tucker	Greens	Jacqui Burke	Liberal	Gary Humphries	Liberal	Greg Cornwell	Liberal
2001	Simon Corbell	Labor	Ted Quinlan	Labor	Katy Gallagher	Labor	Kerrie Tucker	Greens	Helen Cross	Liberal	Gary Humphries	Liberal	Greg Cornwell	Liberal
2003^{4,5}	Simon Corbell	Labor	Ted Quinlan	Labor	Katy Gallagher	Labor	Kerrie Tucker	Greens	Helen Cross	Independent	Jacqui Burke	Liberal	Greg Cornwell	Liberal
2004	Simon Corbell	Labor	Ted Quinlan	Labor	Katy Gallagher	Labor	Deb Foskey	Greens	Richard Mulcahy	Liberal	Jacqui Burke	Liberal	Zed Seselja	Liberal
2006^{6}	Simon Corbell	Labor	Andrew Barr	Labor	Katy Gallagher	Labor	Deb Foskey	Greens	Richard Mulcahy	Liberal	Jacqui Burke	Liberal	Zed Seselja	Liberal
2007^{7}	Simon Corbell	Labor	Andrew Barr	Labor	Katy Gallagher	Labor	Deb Foskey	Greens	Richard Mulcahy	Independent	Jacqui Burke	Liberal	Zed Seselja	Liberal
2008	Simon Corbell	Labor	Andrew Barr	Labor	Katy Gallagher	Labor	Shane Rattenbury	Greens	Caroline Le Couteur	Greens	Jeremy Hanson	Liberal	Zed Seselja	Liberal
2012	Simon Corbell	Labor	Andrew Barr	Labor	Katy Gallagher	Labor	Shane Rattenbury	Greens	Steve Doszpot	Liberal	Jeremy Hanson	Liberal	Giulia Jones	Liberal
2015^{8}	Simon Corbell	Labor	Andrew Barr	Labor	Meegan Fitzharris	Labor	Shane Rattenbury	Greens	Steve Doszpot	Liberal	Jeremy Hanson	Liberal	Giulia Jones	Liberal

^{1} Rosemary Follett (Labor) resigned on 12 December 1996. Simon Corbell (Labor) was elected as her replacement on a countback and was sworn in on 18 February 1997.
^{2} Terry Connolly (Labor) resigned on 19 February 1996. Marion Reilly (Labor) was elected as his replacement on a countback and was sworn in on 26 March 1996.
^{3} Kate Carnell (Liberal) resigned on 17 October 2000. Jacqui Burke (Liberal) was elected as her replacement on a countback and sworn in on 13 February 2001.
^{4} Gary Humphries (Liberal) resigned on 25 November 2002 to take up the position in the Australian Senate that had been vacated by Margaret Reid. Jacqui Burke (Liberal) was elected as his replacement on a countback and sworn in on 18 February 2003.
^{5} Helen Cross resigned from the Liberal Party on 23 September 2003 and remained in the Assembly as an independent.
^{6} Ted Quinlan (Labor) resigned on 21 March 2006. Andrew Barr (Labor) was elected as his replacement on a countback on 3 April 2006.
^{7} Richard Mulcahy was expelled from the Liberal Party Room and subsequently resigned from the Liberal Party on 10 December 2007. Mulcahy indicated he would continue to sit as an independent.
^{8} Katy Gallagher resigned from the ACT Legislative Assembly on 23 December 2014 to take up a position in the Australian Senate. Meegan Fitzharris was elected as her replacement on a countback on 15 January 2015.

== Election results ==
2012 Australian Capital Territory election: Molonglo
Party	Candidate	Votes	%	±%
Quota		11,442		
Labor	Katy Gallagher (elected 1)	23,996	26.2	+10.4
Labor	Andrew Barr (elected 3)	3,880	4.2	−2.0
Labor	Meegan Fitzharris	2,626	2.9	+2.9
Labor	Simon Corbell (elected 4)	1,909	2.1	−3.1
Labor	Mark Kulasingham	1,749	1.9	+1.9
Labor	David Mathews	1,408	1.5	−0.8
Labor	Angie Drake	1,404	1.5	+1.5
Liberal	Jeremy Hanson (elected 2)	10,235	11.2	+7.5
Liberal	Giulia Jones (elected 6)	5,754	6.3	+3.7
Liberal	Steve Doszpot (elected 7)	5,245	5.7	+5.7
Liberal	Elizabeth Lee	4,459	4.9	+4.9
Liberal	Tom Sefton	3,834	4.2	+4.2
Liberal	James Milligan	2,984	3.3	+3.3
Liberal	Murray Gordon	1,750	1.9	+1.9
Greens	Shane Rattenbury (elected 5)	4,966	5.4	−5.4
Greens	Caroline Le Couteur	4,531	5.0	+1.2
Greens	Adriana Siddle	1,395	1.5	+1.5
Greens	Alan Kerlin	1,173	1.3	+1.3
Bullet Train	Tim Bohm	2,218	2.4	+2.4
Bullet Train	Shelley Dickerson	1,893	2.1	+2.1
Motorist	David Cumbers	975	1.1	+0.5
Motorist	Mark Curran	922	1.0	+1.0
Liberal Democrats	Ian Gardner	610	0.7	+0.7
Liberal Democrats	Trisha Jha	517	0.6	+0.6
Independent	Philip Pocock	651	0.7	+0.7
	Stuart Biggs	450	0.5	+0.5
Total formal votes		91,534	97.1	+0.5
Informal votes		2,753	2.9	−0.5
Turnout		94,287	87.1	−1.0
Party total votes
Labor		36,972	40.4	+4.3
Liberal		34,261	37.4	+5.9
Greens		12,065	13.2	−5.0
Bullet Train		4,111	4.5	+4.5
Motorist		1,897	2.1	–0.7
Liberal Democrats		1,127	1.2	+0.3
Independent	Philip Pocock	651	0.7	+0.9
	Stuart Biggs	450	0.5	+0.5

== See also ==
- Australian Capital Territory Electoral Commission
- Australian Capital Territory Legislative Assembly
- Brindabella electorate
- Ginninderra electorate
