= Canberra Liberals =

Canberra Liberals Liberal Party of Australia (A.C.T. Division)
- President: Adam Morris
- Leader: Mark Parton
- Deputy Leader: Deborah Morris
- Founded: 27 January 1949; 77 years ago
- Headquarters: 4/50 Geils Court, Deakin ACT 2600
- Youth wing: Young Liberals
- Women's wing: Liberal Women's Council
- Norfolk Island wing: Norfolk Island Interest Branch
- Ideology: Liberalism (Australian); Conservatism (Australian); Liberal conservatism; Factions: Christian right; Right-wing populism
- Political position: Centre-right to right-wing
- National affiliation: Liberal Party of Australia
- Colours: Blue
- Legislative Assembly: 8 / 25
- House of Representatives: 0 / 3 (ACT seats)
- Senate: 0 / 2 (ACT seats)

Website
- canberraliberals.org.au

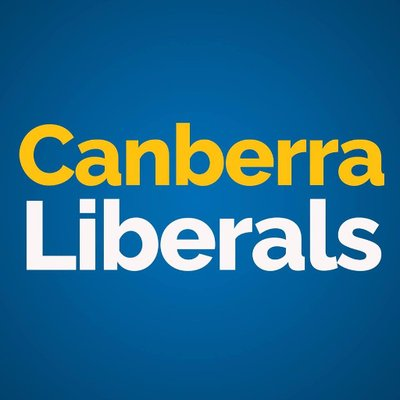
Twitter logo of Canberra Liberals prior to 2021

The Canberra Liberals, officially known as the Liberal Party of Australia (Australian Capital Territory Division), is the division of the Liberal Party of Australia in the Australian Capital Territory (ACT). The party has been in opposition in the ACT Legislative Assembly for much of its existence, but held power with the support of minor parties and independents between 1989 and 1991 and again between 1995 and 2001. As of 2025, it is the only state or territory division of either major party to be unrepresented in the federal parliament.

== History ==
The first Liberal branch in Canberra was formed in order to field a candidate in the newly created Division of Australian Capital Territory at the 1949 federal election. The first meeting of the branch was held at the Albert Hall on 27 January 1949. The inaugural meeting of the Canberra women's branch was held on 29 June 1949. By 1961, there were three branches of the Liberal Party in the ACT, and a branch of the Young Liberals was created around the same time.

The party held a number of seats in the Australian Capital Territory House of Assembly throughout its existence. In the first election under self-government in 1989 the Liberal Party won four seats. The Liberals were led in the Assembly by Trevor Kaine, initially in opposition but in December 1989 the party formed a coalition known as the Alliance with the Residents Rally that lasted from December 1989 until June 1991 when a dispute over school closures broke up the coalition and returned the parties to opposition. Kaine was briefly replaced as leader by Gary Humphries, but regained the position a month later. Two years later he was replaced by Kate Carnell.

At the 1995 election the Liberals won 7 seats and Carnell formed a minority government with the support of independent members Michael Moore and Paul Osborne. Carnell served as Chief Minister until October 2000 when she resigned in advance of a no confidence motion over the increased costs of the Canberra Stadium. She was succeeded by Humphries but the party lost power in the 2001 election. It has been in opposition ever since, having installed and removed multiple leaders including Brendan Smyth, Bill Stefaniak, Zed Seselja, Jeremy Hanson, Alistair Coe, Elizabeth Lee, and Leanne Castley. The current leader of the party is Mark Parton.

In the 2022 federal election, Seselja, who was the sole Canberra Liberals parliamentarian in federal parliament, lost his Senate seat to independent David Pocock. This left the Canberra Liberals with no representation in the 47th Parliament. A review into the territory division's defeat at the election would be headed by former WA Liberal leader Mike Nahan and former Victorian Liberal senator Helen Kroger. The review would include an examination of the Canberra Liberals and its electoral performance among different voter segments, and would propose strategies to regain federal representation.

== Leadership ==
=== Leaders ===
| Image | Name (birth–death) | Electorate | Term start | Term end | Time in office | Chief Minister (term) |
|---|---|---|---|---|---|---|
| | Jim Leedman (1938–2024) | – | 1966 | 30 October 1974 | c. 8 years, 122 days | N/A |
| | Peter Hughes (born 1932) | Canberra | 30 October 1974 | 3 January 1977 | 2 years, 65 days | N/A |
| | Jim Leedman (1938–2024) | Canberra | 20 January 1977 | 10 December 1988 | 11 years, 325 days | N/A |
| | Trevor Kaine (1928–2009) | — | 10 December 1988 | 12 June 1991 | 2 years, 193 days | |
| | Trevor Kaine (1928–2009) | — | 10 December 1988 | 12 June 1991 | 2 years, 193 days | Follett (1989–1989) |
| | Trevor Kaine (1928–2009) | — | 10 December 1988 | 12 June 1991 | 2 years, 193 days | Himself (1989–1991) |
| | Trevor Kaine (1928–2009) | — | 10 December 1988 | 12 June 1991 | 2 years, 193 days | Follett (1991–1995) |
| | Gary Humphries (born 1958) | — | 12 June 1991 | 22 July 1991 | 31 days | Follett (1991–1995) |
| | Trevor Kaine (1928–2009) | — | 22 July 1991 | 21 April 1993 | 1 year, 273 days | Follett (1991–1995) |
| | Kate Carnell (born 1955) | Molonglo (1995–2000) | 21 April 1993 | 17 October 2000 | 7 years, 179 days | Follett (1991–1995) |
| | Kate Carnell (born 1955) | Molonglo (1995–2000) | 21 April 1993 | 17 October 2000 | 7 years, 179 days | Herself (1995–2000) |
| | Gary Humphries (born 1958) | Molonglo | 18 October 2000 | 25 November 2002 | 2 years, 38 days | Himself (2000–2001) |
| | Gary Humphries (born 1958) | Molonglo | 18 October 2000 | 25 November 2002 | 2 years, 38 days | Stanhope (2001–2011) |
| | Brendan Smyth (born 1959) | Brindabella | 25 November 2002 | 16 May 2006 | 3 years, 172 days | Stanhope (2001–2011) |
| | Bill Stefaniak (born 1952) | Ginninderra | 16 May 2006 | 13 December 2007 | 1 year, 211 days | Stanhope (2001–2011) |
| | Zed Seselja (born 1977) | Molonglo (2004–2012); Brindabella (2012–2013) | 13 December 2007 | 11 February 2013 | 5 years, 60 days | Stanhope (2001–2011) |
| | Zed Seselja (born 1977) | Molonglo (2004–2012); Brindabella (2012–2013) | 13 December 2007 | 11 February 2013 | 5 years, 60 days | Gallagher (2011–2014) |
| | Jeremy Hanson (born 1967) | Molonglo (2008–2016); Murrumbidgee (2016–present) | 11 February 2013 | 25 October 2016 | 3 years, 257 days | Gallagher (2011–2014) |
| | Jeremy Hanson (born 1967) | Molonglo (2008–2016); Murrumbidgee (2016–present) | 11 February 2013 | 25 October 2016 | 3 years, 257 days | Barr (2014–) |
| | Alistair Coe (born 1984) | Yerrabi | 25 October 2016 | 27 October 2020 | 4 years, 2 days | Barr (2014–) |
| | Elizabeth Lee (born 1979) | Kurrajong | 27 October 2020 | 31 October 2024 | 4 years, 4 days | Barr (2014–) |
| | Leanne Castley (born 1974) | Yerrabi | 31 October 2024 | 10 November 2025 | 1 year, 10 days | Barr (2014–) |
| | Mark Parton (born 1966) | Brindabella | 10 November 2025 | Incumbent | 213 days | Barr (2014–) |

=== Deputy Leaders ===
| Deputy Leader | Date started | Date finished | Deputy Chief Minister |
|---|---|---|---|
| Tony De Domenico | 1992 | 9 January 1997 | 1995–1997 |
| Gary Humphries | 9 January 1997 | 31 January 1997 | 1997 |
| Trevor Kaine | 31 January 1997 | 17 February 1997 | 1997 |
| Gary Humphries | 17 February 1997 | 17 October 2000 | 1997–2000 |
| Brendan Smyth | 17 October 2000 | 25 November 2002 | 2000–2001 |
| Bill Stefaniak | 25 November 2002 | 2004 | |
| Richard Mulcahy | 2004 | 16 May 2006 | |
| Jacqui Burke | 16 May 2006 | 13 December 2007 | |
| Brendan Smyth | 13 December 2007 | 11 February 2013 | |
| Alistair Coe | 11 February 2013 | 25 October 2016 | |
| Nicole Lawder | 25 October 2016 | 27 October 2020 | |
| Giulia Jones | 27 October 2020 | January 2022 | |
| Jeremy Hanson | February 2022 | 7 December 2023 | |
| Leanne Castley | 7 December 2023 | 31 October 2024 | |
| Jeremy Hanson | 31 October 2024 | 10 November 2025 | |
| Deborah Morris | 10 November 2025 | Incumbent | |

== Election results ==
=== Legislative Assembly ===
| Election | Leader | Votes | % | Seats | +/– | Position | Status |
|---|---|---|---|---|---|---|---|
| 1989 | Trevor Kaine | 21,088 | 14.87 | 4 / 17 | ▲4 | ▲2nd | Opposition |
| 1992 | Trevor Kaine | 45,203 | 29.03 | 6 / 17 | ▲2 | 2nd | Opposition |
| 1995 | Kate Carnell | 66,895 | 40.48 | 7 / 17 | ▲1 | ▲1st | Minority |
| 1998 | Kate Carnell | 68,221 | 37.83 | 7 / 17 | 0 | 1st | Coalition |
| 2001 | Gary Humphries | 60,390 | 31.64 | 7 / 17 | 0 | ▼2nd | Opposition |
| 2004 | Brendan Smyth | 71,083 | 34.81 | 7 / 17 | 0 | 2nd | Opposition |
| 2008 | Zed Seselja | 66,861 | 31.56 | 6 / 17 | ▼1 | 2nd | Opposition |
| 2012 | Zed Seselja | 86,032 | 38.90 | 8 / 17 | ▲2 | ▲1st | Opposition |
| 2016 | Jeremy Hanson | 89,632 | 36.72 | 11 / 25 | ▲3 | ▼2nd | Opposition |
| 2020 | Alistair Coe | 90,955 | 33.81 | 9 / 25 | ▼2 | 2nd | Opposition |
| 2024 | Elizabeth Lee | 91,652 | 33.45 | 9 / 25 | 0 | 2nd | Opposition |
