= Members of the Australian Capital Territory Legislative Assembly, 1989–1991 =

Members of the Australian Capital Territory Legislative Assembly, 1989–1991

This is a list of the members of the first parliament of the Australian Capital Territory Legislative Assembly. It was the Territory's first representative parliament after gaining self-government, and operated from 1989 to 1991.

The first two parliaments were elected under the one-electorate modified d'Hondt method, which was then abolished and replaced with the current three-electorate Hare-Clark system in 1995.

| Name | Party | Term in office |
|---|---|---|
| Wayne Berry | ALP | 1989–2008 |
| Bernard Collaery | Residents Rally | 1989–1991 |
| Terry Connolly^{[3]} | ALP | 1990–1996 |
| Craig Duby | No Self-Government Party/ Independents Group/ Hare-Clark Independent Party^{[2]} | 1989–1991 |
| Rosemary Follett | ALP | 1989–1996 |
| Ellnor Grassby | ALP | 1989–1995 |
| Gary Humphries | Liberal | 1989–2002 |
| Norm Jensen | Residents Rally | 1989–1991 |
| Trevor Kaine | Liberal | 1989–2001 |
| Dr Hector Kinloch | Residents Rally | 1989–1991 |
| Carmel Maher | No Self-Government Party/ Independents Group^{[2]} | 1989–1991 |
| Michael Moore | Residents Rally/Independent^{[1]} | 1989–2001 |
| Robyn Nolan | Liberal/New Conservative Group^{[4]} | 1989–1991 |
| David Prowse | No Self-Government Party/ Independents Group/Liberal^{[2]} | 1989–1991 |
| Bill Stefaniak | Liberal | 1989–1992, 1994–2008 |
| Dennis Stevenson | Abolish Self-Government Coalition | 1989–1995 |
| Paul Whalan^{[3]} | ALP | 1989–1990 |
| Bill Wood | ALP | 1989–2004 |

^{1} Michael Moore was elected as a Residents Rally member, but resigned from the party on 24 October 1989 and served out his term as an independent.
^{2} Craig Duby, Carmel Maher and David Prowse were elected as representatives of the No Self-Government Party, but resigned to form the Independents Group on 3 December 1989. Prowse left the Independents Group to join the Liberal Party on 31 July 1990, Duby left to found the Hare-Clark Independent Party on 19 November 1991, and Maher served out her term under the Independents Group name.
^{3} ALP member Paul Whalan resigned from the Assembly on 30 April 1990. The vacancy was filled by the ALP's Terry Connolly.
^{4} Robyn Nolan was elected as a Liberal member, but resigned from the party on 22 October 1991. She became an independent until founding the New Conservative Group on 19 November.

== See also ==
- 1989 Australian Capital Territory election
