= Alliance (Australian Capital Territory) =

Political alliance in Australia

- A cartoon published by The Canberra Times showing Collaery and Kaine holding Duby
- Liberal leader: Trevor Kaine
- Residents Rally leader: Bernard Collaery
- Founded: 5 December 1989; 35 years ago
- Dissolved: 6 June 1991; 34 years ago
- Member parties: ACT Liberal Party; Residents Rally; Independents Group
- Legislative Assembly: 9 / 17 (1989–1991)

Website
- Alliance accord

The Alliance, sometimes known as the Liberal–Residents Rally Alliance, was a political alliance between the Liberal Party, Residents Rally and Independents Group in the Australian Capital Territory Legislative Assembly.

The Alliance was formed in December 1989 after a no-confidence motion against the sitting Labor Party government saw Liberal leader Trevor Kaine take power. However, the agreement dissolved less than two years later when the Rally was sacked from the Alliance, subsequently voting with Labor to topple the Kaine government in June 1991.

== History ==
=== Background ===
The 1989 ACT election, which was the first under self-government, resulted in Labor emerging as the largest party with five seats, the Liberals and the Residents Rally winning four each, the No Self Government Party (NSG) winning three and the Abolish Self Government Coalition (ASGC) winning one. It took almost two months to determine the final results, with Labor leader Rosemary Follett becoming chief minister at the first sitting of the Legislative Assembly on 11 May 1989.

The first Assembly was characterised by a hung parliament and significant political instability. Within weeks, there was speculation that the Liberals would move an immediate no-confidence motion in Follett, although this was initially denied by Liberal leader Trevor Kaine. By September, however, Kaine openly stated his party seeking to work with the Residents Rally to topple the Labor government, while the Residents Rally – led by Bernard Collaery – suggested a "collegiate-style" Assembly as an alternative.

The potential for an alliance with the Liberals was controversial within the Residents Rally. Collaery assured the party's executive that there had been no negotiations "whatsoever" with the Liberals. On 23 October, Rally MLA Michael Moore left the party after an unsuccessful bid to prevent the party moving a no-confidence motion. He was followed by four members of the party's executive, as well as around 30 rank-and-file members.

=== No-confidence motion against Follett ===
On 23 November 1989, a no-confidence motion was moved by Collaery, which was scheduled to be debated less than two weeks later on 5 December. Kaine said the Liberals had a "solid alliance" with the Rally, with the parties creating a draft document several months earlier in the event they took government.

12 days before the vote was set to take place, the no-confidence motion had the support of all Liberal and Rally MLAs, as well as ASGC MLA Dennis Stevenson and NSG MLA David Prowse, while now-independent Michael Moore and NSG MLAs Craig Duby and Carmel Maher backed Labor in opposing it (although as Speaker, Prowse did not publicly state his position).

An opinion poll conducted by The Canberra Times between 13 November and 23 November (the day the no-confidence motion was moved) found 29% of ACT voters said a Liberal–Rally alliance would be good, 56% said it was bad and 15% were unsure.

With the vote approaching, the Liberals and Rally entering government appeared inevitable. This was despite the parties publicly expressing their differences over policies including budget consultation, education funding, X-rated videos and the development of a casino.

One day before the vote, Duby and Maher announced they would support the no-confidence motion, leaving the No Self Government Party and forming the Independents Group. Prowse also left the party, leaving it without any seats, but remained tight-lipped about his vote. The move sealed the Labor government's fate, and on 5 December 1989, Collaery officially moved the no-confidence motion:

That this Assembly no longer has confidence in the Chief Minister of the ACT and the minority Labor Government and has confidence in the ability of Mr Kaine to form a government.

Collaery said the motion had its "direct origins" in reporting that the government had sought to secure by the vote of Prowse for the "Business Franchise ("X" Videos) Bill", which the Rally claimed was a "barely disguised threat" from Labor. The motion was resolved in the affirmative (10 votes to 7 votes), with Stevenson and Moore voting with Labor against the motion.

Ayes (10):

- Gary Humphries (Liberal)
- Trevor Kaine (Liberal)
- Robyn Nolan (Liberal)
- Bill Stefaniak (Liberal)
- Bernard Collaery (Residents Rally)
- Norm Jensen (Residents Rally)
- Hector Kinloch (Residents Rally)
- Craig Duby (Independents Group)
- Carmel Maher (Independents Group)
- David Prowse (Independents Group)

Noes (7):

- Wayne Berry (Labor)
- Rosemary Follett (Labor)
- Ellnor Grassby (Labor)
- Paul Whalan (Labor)
- Bill Wood (Labor)
- Dennis Stevenson (Abolish Self Government)
- Michael Moore (Independent)

=== Alliance formation ===
Immediately following the motion, Trevor Kaine was elected by the Assembly as chief minister, and the Alliance government was formed. The new ministry was announced two days later, which included Collaery as deputy chief minister. Kaine briefly held all portfolios after becoming chief minister, before the new ministry was sworn in on 13 December 1988.

In April 1990, Duby − while serving as minister with responsibility for road safety − was convicted of two offences of driving under the influence. A censure motion was moved in the Assembly, although it did not succeed, and Duby remained in the ministry despite calls from some Alliance MLAs for him to step down.

On 6 August 1990, it was announced that David Prowse had left the Independents Group to join the Liberal Party. His membership application was formally approved on 9 August. The move did not change the overall number of Alliance MLAs, and Prowse remained Speaker.

Public views on the Alliance were largely negative. A Canberra Times/Datacol poll in August 1990 showed the Rally with just 1% of the vote, and further polling in May 1991 found most voters considered the government to be a failure.

=== Final days ===
By late 1990, tensions within the Alliance began to show. Rally MLA Hector Kinloch still preferred a "collegiate-style" government and said his party had some "re-negotiating" to do with the Liberals, although at the one-year anniversary of its formation, the agreement was still holding together.

Follett attempted to get non-Liberal MLAs to leave the Alliance and support Labor forming government, although this initially proved unsuccessful. By March 1991, it appeared the Alliance was nearing its end, as Kaine stated he expected the Rally and the Independents Group to leave the government after the budget was released.

On 26 April 1991, Kinloch resigned from the government, but remained in the Residents Rally. The same day, Collaery announced the Residents Rally would leave the government if a casino development was approved. In response, Kaine said that the Rally was in "disarray" and could expect to be relegated to a minor role within the government. The Australian Democrats, who did not have any seats in the Assembly at the time, announced that they would not enter into a coalition government with the Liberals if they were successful in gaining representation at the next election.

=== Disbandment ===
On 29 May 1991, Kaine sacked the Residents Rally from the Alliance after Rally MLAs declined to support a number of government policies, including the Canberra casino development, the decision to close schools and the decision to close the Royal Canberra Hospital. This forced the government into minority, but the Alliance temporarily remained − now with only the Liberals and the Independents Group. No deputy chief minister was initially chosen to take over from Collaery, although Duby expected to be elevated to the position.

Labor leader Rosemary Follett announced she would move a no-confidence motion against Kaine, which was scheduled to be debated on 6 June. She immediately began negotiations with the Rally and other minor parties.

One day before the vote, Kaine said Rally president David Read had called him to offer a proposal that would see Collaery become chief minister and Liberal MLAs serve in minor riles. At this point, Rally MLAs remained undecided on how they would vote in the motion.

On 6 June 1991, a Residents Rally executive meeting voted 14−0 to support the motion, and the three Rally MLAs subsequently voted with Labor, leading to Follett returning to the position of chief minister. Following the vote, Follett announced that Rally MLAs would not be part of the new Labor government.

The no-confidence motion was resolved in the affirmative (9 votes to 7 votes), with ASGC MLA Dennis Stevenson abstaining after declaring that "the people of Canberra have no confidence in any government in this Assembly...indeed, they have no confidence in any of us".

Ayes (9):

- Wayne Berry (Labor)
- Terry Connolly (Labor)
- Rosemary Follett (Labor)
- Ellnor Grassby (Labor)
- Bill Wood (Labor)
- Bernard Collaery (Residents Rally)
- Norm Jensen (Residents Rally)
- Hector Kinloch (Residents Rally)
- Michael Moore (Independent)

Noes (7):

- Gary Humphries (Liberal)
- Trevor Kaine (Liberal)
- Robyn Nolan (Liberal)
- David Prowse (Liberal)
- Bill Stefaniak (Liberal)
- Craig Duby (Independents Group)
- Carmel Maher (Independents Group)

=== Aftermath ===
Kaine was spilled as Liberal leader on 12 June and replaced by Gary Humphries. Just days earlier, The Canberra Times reported that "senior Liberal sources" believed Kaine was a "poor communicator" and "intransigent", although party president Jim Leedman had said Kaine's position as leader was safe.

== See also ==
- Labor–Greens coalition
