= Roberta McRae =

Australian politician, teacher, lawyer, academic

Roberta McRae OAM

2nd Speaker of the Australian Capital Territory Legislative Assembly
- In office 27 March 1992 – 9 March 1995
- Preceded by: David Prowse
- Succeeded by: Greg Cornwell

Member of the ACT Legislative Assembly
- In office 15 February 1992 – 9 March 1995 Serving with Berry, Carnell, Connolly, Cornwell, De Domenico, Ellis, Follett, Grassby, Humphries, Kaine, Lamont, Moore, Stevenson, Szuty, Westende, Wood
- Preceded by: Multi-member single constituency
- Succeeded by: Multi-member multiple constituencies
- In office 9 March 1995 – 21 February 1998 Serving with Berry, Hird, Horodny, Stefaniak
- Preceded by: Multi-member single constituency
- Succeeded by: Jon Stanhope
- Constituency: Ginninderra

Personal details
- Born: 6 September 1948 (age 78) Italy
- Party: Labor Party
- Education: Frankston Teachers' College; Armidale College of Advanced Education; Australian National University; Macquarie University
- Occupation: Academic; teacher; lawyer; former politician

Roberta McRae OAM (born 6 September 1948 in Italy) is an Australian former politician who was a member of the unicameral Australian Capital Territory Legislative Assembly from 1992 to 1998, elected to the multi-member single constituency Assembly and later elected to represent the multi-member electorate of Ginninderra for the Labor Party. A former teacher, following politics, McRae entered academia.

== Teaching career ==
McRae was educated in Australia and trained as an infants' teacher at the Teachers' College in Frankston, Victoria and commenced teaching at St Albans, Victoria in 1970, before relocating to Canberra. By 1972 she taught at primary schools in Macquarie and Watson. In 1973, McRae travelled to Malaysia with Australian Volunteers Abroad and taught English as a second language at the Mara Institute of Technology. She returned to Australia in 1974, gained employment as public servant in the Department of Education and developed curriculum materials for the teaching of English as a second language (ESL) in Australian primary schools. From 1976 to 1989, McRae was employed by the Canberra College Technical and Further Education and the University of Canberra to train ESL teachers and also completed a Graduate Diploma in Multicultural Studies at the College of Advanced Education in Armidale, New South Wales and graduated with a Bachelor of Arts at the Australian National University in 1984.

McRae worked as a speechwriter in the early days of the first ACT Administration, and in the Australian Public Service Commission where she managed a major review of the impact of Equal Employment Opportunity programs on people of non-English speaking backgrounds.

== Political career ==
McRae was initially elected to the second ACT Legislative Assembly at the 1992 general election, and elected to represent Ginninderra in the Assembly in 1995 general election. McRae contested the 1998 ACT general election, however was unsuccessful in retaining her seat. During her term in the Assembly, McRae served as Speaker of the Australian Capital Territory Legislative Assembly, and was responsible for the successful A$12 million project to create a permanent home of the Assembly.

== Career after politics ==
McRae worked initially with the Education Network of Australia and then the Department of Health and Aged Care as a deputy director. McRae returned to study and by 2003 had completed a Graduate Diploma in Legal Practice at the Australian National University and graduated with a Bachelor of Laws from Macquarie University. She commenced employment as a lawyer specialising in residential and commercial property conveyancing and commercial law before teaching real estate and property law at the Australian National University on a casual basis. Since 2010, McRae has lectured in property law at the Australian National University, College of Law.

== Honours ==
In 1990, McRae was awarded a Medal of the Order of Australia for service to migrant assistance.

== See also ==
- List of the first women holders of political offices in Oceania

Australian Capital Territory Legislative Assembly
Preceded by Multi-member single constituency	Member of the ACT Legislative Assembly; 1992–1995; Served alongside: Berry, Carnell, Connolly, Cornwell, De Domenico, Ellis, Follett, Grassby, Humphries, Kaine, Lamont, Moore, Stevenson, Szuty, Westende, Wood	Multi-member multiple constituencies
Preceded by Multi-member single constituency	Member for Ginninderra; 1995–1998; Served alongside: Berry, Hird, Horodny, Stefaniak	Succeeded by Jon Stanhope
Political offices
Preceded by David Prowse	Speaker of the Australian Capital Territory Legislative Assembly; 1992–1995	Succeeded by Greg Cornwell
