= Craig Duby =

Australian politician (born 1949)

Member of the ACT Legislative Assembly
- In office 8 May 1989 – 15 February 1992 Serving with Berry, Collaery, Connolly, Follett, Grassby, Humphries, Jensen, Kaine, Kinloch, Maher, Moore, Nolan, Prowse, Stefaniak, Stevenson, Wood, Whalan
- Preceded by: new constituency
- Succeeded by: multi-member single constituencies

Minister for Finance and Urban Services
- In office 7 December 1989 – 6 June 1991
- Preceded by: Ellnor Grassby (as Minister for Housing and Urban Services)
- Succeeded by: Rosemary Follett

Minister for Housing and Community Services
- In office 29 May 1991 – 6 June 1991
- Preceded by: Bernard Collaery
- Succeeded by: Rosemary Follett

Leader of the Opposition
- In office 21 June 1991 – 21 June 1991
- Preceded by: Trevor Kaine
- Succeeded by: Gary Humphries

Personal details
- Born: 20 February 1949 (age 77) Brisbane, Queensland, Australia
- Party: No Self-Government Party 1989; Independents Group 1989-91; Hare-Clark Independence Party 1991-92
- Occupation: Politician; public servant

Craig John Duby (born 20 February 1949) is an Australian former politician who was a member of the unicameral Legislative Assembly of the Australian Capital Territory between 1989 and 1992, elected to the multi-member single constituency Assembly as a representative of the No Self-Government Party. During his term in office, Duby was a member of the Independents Group and the Hare-Clark Independence Party. Duby was the Minister for Finance and Urban Services and briefly was the Minister for Housing and Community Services in the Kaine ministry. For part of one day, he served as the Leader of the Opposition.

== Biography ==
Born on 20 February 1949 in Brisbane, Queensland, Duby attended St Columban's College in Albion. Prior to entering politics, Duby worked as a real estate manager and public servant in the ACT Administration.

Duby was elected to the inaugural ACT Legislative Assembly in 1989 general election on a platform that was critical of the decision by the Australian Government to replace direct administration of the Territory with self-government. The anti-self-government movement carried significant popular weight; an advisory referendum held in 1978 concluded that only 30.5 per cent of electors were in favour of self-government; and Duby plus two other members of his No Self Government Party and a representative of the Abolish Self-Government Coalition were elected to the inaugural 17-member Assembly. However, once elected, reversal of the move to self-government proved impractical. Duby resigned from the No Self-Government Party, along with Carmel Maher and David Prowse, to form the Independents Group on 3 December 1989. Duby left the Independents Group to found the Hare-Clark Independence Party on 19 November 1991.

Duby served as Minister for Finance and Urban Services in the first Kaine ministry. In 1989 and 1990, he was convicted of two offences of driving under the influence, during the period when he was the minister with responsibility for road safety. A censure motion was moved against Duby in the Assembly; resolved in the negative:

That, noting that for the second time within two years the Minister for Finance and Urban Services, Mr Duby, has been convicted under the Motor Traffic (Alcohol and Drugs) Act 1977, and noting that Mrs Robyn Nolan took the honourable path and stood down from the position of Mr Duby's Executive Deputy following a conviction under the Commonwealth Taxation Administration Act, this Assembly censures the Minister for Finance and Urban Services, Mr Duby, for failing to resign as Minister.

— Wayne Berry, Deputy Opposition Leader of the Australian Capital Territory, 29 May 1990.

On Friday 21 June 1991, Duby held the post of Opposition Leader of the Australian Capital Territory for 6.5 hours. Liberal Party leader Trevor Kaine resigned to allow colleague Gary Humphries to take the job, but as the Liberals did not have a majority in the ACT Parliament and nominated Duby. After the first vote was tied, a second vote elected Duby, at which point he announced that he didn't believe he should hold the title as there were five non-government groupings in the Assembly, and instead asked to be referred to as the 'coordinator of non-government business'. Duby said he would donate the additional salary for the job to charity, and share the extra staffing resources with the other non-government parties. Later that day, Liberal and Labor MLAs combined to change the Assembly's standing orders so that the leader of the largest non-government party would occupy the role. Duby was replaced by Humphries without resigning from the position.

As Minister for Finance and Urban Services one of his more notable achievements was the construction of a cover for the Canberra Olympic Swimming Pool permitting its year-round use, dubbed the "Duby dome". Commenting on the Duby dome in 1996, Liberal leader Gary Humphries said:

The words of some great sage spring to mind: "Things that men do live after them". I am afraid that there is very little else in the Territory that will live after Mr Duby, so to do away with his one remaining monument in the Territory would be a great pity, Mr Speaker

In the last days of the Kaine ministry, Duby served as Minister for Housing and Community Services; and then, for part of one day, as Leader of the Opposition.

Australian Capital Territory Legislative Assembly
New title	Member of the ACT Legislative Assembly; 1989–1991; Served alongside: Berry, Collaery, Connolly, Follett, Grassby, Humphries, Jensen, Kaine, Kinloch, Maher, Moore, Nolan, Prowse, Stefaniak, Stevenson, Wood, Whalan	Multi-member single constituency
Political offices
Preceded by Ellnor Grassby (as Minister for Housing and Urban Services)	Minister for Finance and Urban Services; 1989 – 1991	Succeeded by Rosemary Follett
Preceded by Bernard Collaery	Minister for Housing and Community Services; 1991	Succeeded by Rosemary Follett
Party political offices
Preceded by Trevor Kaine	Opposition Leader of the Australian Capital Territory; 1991	Succeeded by Gary Humphries
