= Sun Ripened Warm Tomato Party =

Defunct joke political party

- Abbreviation: SRWT; SRWTP; Tomato Party
- Leader: Emile Brunoro
- Founder: Emile Brunoro
- Founded: 10 January 1989; 37 years ago
- Registered: 19 January 1989; 37 years ago
- Dissolved: 23 December 1991; 34 years ago
- Headquarters: 5 Phillip Avenue; Watson, Canberra
- Ideology: Joke

The Sun Ripened Warm Tomato Party (SRWT or SRWTP) was an Australian joke political party that contested the first election for the Australian Capital Territory Legislative Assembly in 1989.

The SRWTP was one of six parties formed by "provocateur" Emile Brunoro for the 1989 election − the others being Party! Party! Party!, the Surprise Party, Home Rule OK, A Better Idea and Sleepers Wake. Brunoro planned to register a total of 17 parties (including one called the "Pre-Selection Party") and stand as a candidate for all of them, but was prevented by a $100 fee and the Australian Electoral Commission (AEC) closing a loophole in the electoral rules.

== History ==
=== Formation ===
The SRWTP was formed by on 10 January 1989 by Emile Brunoro, a two-time federal election candidate who contested the electorate of Fraser at the 1984 and 1987 elections. It was officially registered with the Australian Electoral Commission (AEC) nine days later on 19 January. Brunoro was also a member of the Residents Rally and a former member of the Rainbow Alliance, which were both also contesting the election (although the Rainbow Alliance later withdrew and joined the Fair Elections Coalition).

It appears Brunoro may have got the idea for the party from Michael Boddy, who wrote in The Canberra Times on 1 January 1989:

In fact, if someone would bring a bit of sense into the coming self-government elections and start an SRWT party, dedicated to banning the gas-coloured fake tomato forever from the ACT (an acronym you can't eat), I'd be in there boots and all with my support for such a civilised and civilising move.

=== 1989 election ===
Just as Boddy had called for, the SRWTP advocated for a ban on "gas-coloured fake tomatoes" from the ACT.

In February 1989, Brunoro commissioned opinion polling with Billy Bong Research, showing the SRWTP with 3.7% of the vote. The results were rejected by ACT Labor Party leader Rosemary Follett and Liberal leader Trevor Kaine, with Kaine stating that: "The Sun-Ripened Warm Tomato Party notwithstanding, I think people will see that [the election is] not a joke".

At the election on 4 March 1989, the SRWTP received 1.17% of first preference votes. While it wasn't enough to elect Brunoro, the party's preferences did help to elect Residents Rally candidates. 1.17% was the largest vote total for any of Brunoro's parties, with Party! Party! Party! receiving 0.69%, the Surprise Party and Sleepers Wake both claiming 0.12%, A Better Idea having 0.06% and Home Rule OK finishing with the lowest vote total for any party, 0.04% (or 62 votes).

=== Deregistration ===
Following the election, federal Liberal Party MP David Hawker attempted to ban "irreverent political party names" for the next ACT election, but the amendment was unsuccessful after the federal Labor government opposed it on the basis that "it would be too difficult to define mischievous in a legal sense".

However, party registration laws were changed in the ACT to require that parties have 100 members and a formal constitution before being eligible to register. Although the SRWT applied for re-registration, it was rejected by the AEC because it could not prove it had 100 members, and the party was formally deregistered on 23 November 1991.
