= 1992 Australian Capital Territory election =

- 15 February 1992

All 17 seats in the Australian Capital Territory Legislative Assembly 9 seats needed for a majority
- Opinion polls
- Turnout: 90.3 (▲1.5 pp)
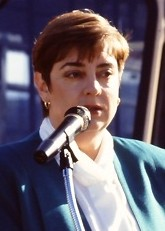

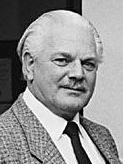
	First party	Second party
Leader	Rosemary Follett	Trevor Kaine
Party	Labor	Liberal
Leader since	17 December 1988	22 July 1991
Last election	5 seats	4 seats
Seats before	5	5
Seats won	8	6
Seat change	▲3	▲1
Primary vote	62,155	45,203
Percentage	39.9%	29.0%
Swing	▲17.1	▲14.1
	Third party	Fourth party
	ASGC	MMIG
Leader	Dennis Stevenson	Michael Moore
Party	Abolish Self Govt	Moore Inds
Last election	1 seat	Did not exist
Seats before	1	1
Seats won	1	2
Seat change	Steady	▲1
Primary vote	10,998	8,724
Percentage	7.1%	5.6%
Swing	▼0.4	▲5.6
- At-Large electorate results
Chief Minister before election
Rosemary Follett
Labor
Resulting Chief Minister
Rosemary Follett
Labor

Elections to the 1992 Australian Capital Territory Legislative Assembly was held on Saturday, 15 February, alongside a referendum on electoral change for future elections.

The incumbent Labor Party, led by Rosemary Follett, was challenged by the Liberal Party, led by Trevor Kaine. Candidates were elected to fill seats using list proportional representation (the modified d'Hondt electoral system) and a multi-member at-large constituency.

The result was another hung parliament. However, Labor, with the largest representation in the 17-member unicameral Assembly, formed Government with the support of Michael Moore and Helen Szuty. Follett was elected Chief Minister at the first sitting of the second Assembly on 27 March 1992.

The referendum saw a majority vote to move to single transferable voting.

== Key dates ==
- Close of party registration: 9 January 1992
- Pre-election period commenced/nominations opened: 10 January 1992
- Rolls closed: 17 January 1992
- Nominations closed: 24 January 1992
- Polling day: 15 February 1992
- Poll declared: 20 March 1992

== Results ==
Party	Votes	%	+/–	Seats	+/–
Labor	62,155	39.92	▲17.10	8	▲3
Liberal	45,203	29.03	▲14.16	6	▲2
Abolish Self Government Coalition	10,998	7.06	▼0.44	1	0
Moore Independents	8,724	5.60	New	2	New
Residents Rally	7,104	4.56	▼5.06	0	▼4
Democrats	6,960	4.47	▲2.81	0	0
The Better Management An Independent Team	5,021	3.22	New	0	New
Hare-Clark Independence Party	3,336	2.14	New	0	0
Independents	2,271	1.46	▼10.07	0	0
New Conservative Group	1,869	1.20	New	0	New
Canberra Unity Party	1,482	0.95	New	0	New
Canberra Party	580	0.37	New	0	New
Total	155,703	100.00	–	17	–
Valid votes	155,703	93.53			
Invalid/blank votes	10,764	6.47	▲0.8		
Total votes	166,467	100.00	–		
Registered voters/turnout	184,405	90.27	▲1.5		

== Candidates ==
Sitting members at the time of the election are listed in bold. Tickets that elected at least one MLA are highlighted in the relevant colour. Successful candidates are indicated by an asterisk (*).

=== Retiring members ===
- Hector Kinloch (Residents Rally)
- Carmel Maher (Independents Group)
- David Prowse (Liberal)

=== Candidates ===
Labor candidates	Liberal candidates	Moore candidates	Residents Rally candidates
1. **Rosemary Follett***; 2. **Wayne Berry***; 3. **Bill Wood***; 4. Roberta McRae*; 5. **Terry Connolly***; 6. Annette Ellis*; 7. David Lamont*; 8. **Ellnor Grassby***; 9. David Wedgwood; 10. Marion Reilly; 11. Anne Higgins	1. **Trevor Kaine***; 2. Tony De Domenico*; 3. Greg Cornwell*; 4. Kate Carnell*; 5. **Gary Humphries***; 6. Lou Westende*; 7. Kaarina Sutinen; 8. **Bill Stefaniak**; 9. Roger Dace; 10. Lyn Johnson	1. **Michael Moore***; 2. Helen Szuty*; 3. Tina Van Raay; 4. Stephen Mugford	1. **Bernard Collaery**; 2. **Norm Jensen**; 3. Chris Donohue; 4. David Evans; 5. Lisa Middlebrook; 6. Jack Kershaw; 7. Silva Cengic; 8. Noel Haberecht
Democrats candidates	Hare-Clark candidates	ASGC candidates	Canberra Party candidates
1. Julie McCarron-Benson; 2. Graeme Evans; 3. Domenic Mico; 4. Heinrich Stefanik; 5. Jim Coates; 6. Ian Buchanan; 7. Tony Coles	1. **Craig Duby**; 2. Fiona Patten; 3. Barry Williams; 4. Sitthiphone Saysitthideth; 5. Nigel Grime	1. **Dennis Stevenson***; 2. Graeme Orchiston; 3. Angela Brown; 4. Mike Trevethan; 5. Ute Ernst; 6. Andy Stodulka; 7. Geoff Doepel; 8. Patricia Colquhoun; 9. Fred Corlett	1. Jim Weston; 2. Peter Burrows; 3. Glen Smith; 4. Tony Urbancik; 5. Lee Judd; 6. Bernie Clough
Canberra Unity candidates	Better Mgmt Team candidates	New Conservative candidates	Ungrouped candidates
1. Marion Le; 2. Barry Reid; 3. Don Allan; 4. Debbie Ellis; 5. Ross Stuart	1. Harold Hird; 2. Bev Cains; 3. Alan Fitzgerald; 4. Jim O'Neill; 5. Iain Calman; 6. Christine McGibbon; 7. Ken Ewan; 8. Marc Sadil	1. **Robyn Nolan**; 2. Fran James; 3. Wendy Carlton; 4. Rita Cameron	Emile Brunoro (Ind); Tony Scott (Ind); Tony Spagnolo (Ind); Ron Hamilton (Ind); Lara Pullin (Ind); Derek Rosborough (Ind)

== Opinion polling ==
=== Voting intention ===
Date	Firm	Sample size	Primary vote								
Date	Firm	Sample size	ALP	LIB	ASG	RR	DEM	IND	OTH	UND	INF
15 Feb 1992	1992 election		39.9%	29.0%	7.1%	4.6%	4.5%	1.5%	13.5%	—	6.5%
14 Feb 1992	Michael Moore Independent Group	275	28%	21%	—N/a	—N/a	—N/a	—N/a	(Note: While no specific figures were released for parties other than Labor or the Liberals, the Michael Moore Independent Group was "the closest" to 5%.)	39%	8%
6−11 Feb 1992	Datacol	1,333	36%	27%	3%	4%	4%	5%	9% (Note: The Michael Moore Independent Group had 3%, specified minor parties (Canberra Unity Party, the Better Management Team, the New Conservative Group and the Hare-Clark Independence Party) had a combined vote of 4%, while unspecified minor parties had 2%. The Canberra Party had 0%.)	15%	—N/a
29 Jan 1992	Internal Labor poll		7 seats	6 seats	—N/a	—N/a	—N/a	4 seats (Note: Projection for independents and minor parties combined. The Canberra Times wrote that "the poll indicated that, although independent MLA Michael Moore had a good chance of being re-elected, it was probable that the other three independent places would be filled by more conservative candidates.)		13%	—N/a
15−20 Dec 1991	Datacol	915	38.7%	20.7%	—N/a	0.8%	2.2%	10.6%	2.1%	19.2%	2.8%
29 Nov 1991	Internal Liberal poll		24%	19%	—N/a	—N/a	—N/a	—N/a	—N/a	24%	—N/a
25 Nov 1991	Internal Labor poll (Morris Guest)		38%	19%	—N/a	<1%	—N/a	—N/a	—N/a	14%	—N/a
17 Nov 1991	Internal Canberra Party poll	521	22.20%	15.06%	—N/a	—N/a	—N/a	10.23%	—N/a	—N/a	—N/a
6 June 1991	Labor leader Rosemary Follett returns as chief minister										
30 Apr−16 May 1991	Datacol	808	52%	30%	2%	4%	3%	6%	4% (Note: The Greens had 2%, the Independents Group had 1% and other parties had 1%.)	—N/a	—N/a
18−24 Aug 1990	Datacol	601	38.4%	18.1%	0.7%	1.0%	2.7%	7.5%	11.4% (Note: The No Self Government Party had 2.1%, the Greens had 1.9% and other parties had 7.4%.)	17.6%	7.4%
5 Dec 1989	Liberal leader Trevor Kaine becomes chief minister and the Alliance government is formed										
13−23 Nov 1989	Datacol	625	34%	21%	1%	5%	—N/a	—N/a	14% (Note: The No Self Government Party had 4%, the Greens had 2% and "other parties" (including independents) had 8%.)	14%	10%
10−16 Aug 1989	Datacol	651	34%	19%	8% (Note: The Canberra Times wrote: "Almost all respondents who indicated they would vote for a no-self-government party nominated the No Self Government Party. But a small minority indicated the Abolish Self Government Coalition, and it was unclear of some which actual grouping they would support, so they have been linked".)	8%	—N/a	7%	5% (Note: The Greens had 5%.)	14%	6%
4 Mar 1989	1989 election		22.8%	14.9%	7.5%	9.6%	1.7%	11.5%	20.5%	—	5.7%

=== Leadership approval ratings ===
==== Rosemary Follett (Labor) ====
Date	Firm	Sample size	Approval rating		Performance rating				
Date	Firm	Sample size	Approve	Disapprove	VB	B	M	G	VG
17 November 1991	Internal Canberra Party poll	521	55.56%		—N/a	—N/a	—N/a	—N/a	—N/a
30 April−16 May 1991	Datacol	808	—N/a	—N/a	10%	20%	40%	23%	7%
18−24 August 1990	Datacol	601	73%					28%	8%
13−23 November 1989	Datacol	625			13%	18%	37%	25%	7%
10−16 August 1989	Datacol	651			10%	13%	39%	31%	7%

==== Trevor Kaine (Liberal) ====
Date	Firm	Sample size	Approval rating		Performance rating				
Date	Firm	Sample size	Approve	Disapprove	VB	B	M	G	VG
30 April−16 May 1991	Datacol	808	—N/a	—N/a	32%	29%	26%	11%	2%
18−24 August 1990	Datacol	601	47%					12%	3%
13−23 November 1989	Datacol	625			23%	32%	34%	9%	1%
10−16 August 1989	Datacol	651			16%	28%	43%	11%	2%

==== Bernard Collaery (Rally) ====
Date	Firm	Sample size	Approval rating		Performance rating				
Date	Firm	Sample size	Approve	Disapprove	VB	B	M	G	VG
30 April−16 May 1991	Datacol	808	—N/a	—N/a	38%	30%	23%	7%	2%
18−24 August 1990	Datacol	601	32%						1%
13−23 November 1989	Datacol	625			46%	27%	20%	6%	1%
10−16 August 1989	Datacol	651			29%	27%	28%	13%	3%

==== Craig Duby (NSG/IG/HCIP) ====
Date	Firm	Sample size	Approval rating		Performance rating				
Date	Firm	Sample size	Approve	Disapprove	VB	B	M	G	VG
30 April−16 May 1991	Datacol	808	—N/a	—N/a	57%	26%	14%	3%	0%
18−24 August 1990	Datacol	601			59%				
13−23 November 1989	Datacol	625			66%	19%	12%	3%	0%
10−16 August 1989	Datacol	651			40%	30%	25%	4%	1%

==== Dennis Stevenson (ASGC) ====
Date	Firm	Sample size	Approval rating		Performance rating				
Date	Firm	Sample size	Approve	Disapprove	VB	B	M	G	VG
30 April−16 May 1991	Datacol	808	—N/a	—N/a	70%	15%	11%	3%	1%
13−23 November 1989	Datacol	625			69%	15%	11%	4%	1%
18−24 August 1990	Datacol	601			63%				

== See also ==
- Members of the Australian Capital Territory Legislative Assembly, 1992–1995
- Third Follett Ministry
- List of Australian Capital Territory elections
