= David Prowse (politician) =

Australian politician (born 1941)

Member of the ACT Legislative Assembly
- In office 4 March 1989 – 15 February 1992 Serving with Berry, Collaery, Connolly, Duby, Follett, Grassby, Humphries, Jensen, Kaine, Kinloch, Maher, Moore, Nolan, Stefaniak, Stevenson, Wood, Whalan
- Succeeded by: Multi-member single constituency

1st Speaker of the Australian Capital Territory Legislative Assembly
- In office 11 May 1989 – 15 February 1992
- Succeeded by: Roberta McRae

Personal details
- Born: 10 March 1941 (age 85) Cairns, Queensland
- Party: No Self-Government Party; Independents Group; Liberal Party
- Children: 6
- Education: Royal Melbourne Institute of Technology
- Occupation: Electrical engineer, naturopath, politician

Military service
- Allegiance: Australia
- Branch/service: Royal Australian Air Force
- Rank: Squadron Leader

David John Prowse (born 10 March 1941), a former Australian politician, was the first Speaker of the Australian Capital Territory Legislative Assembly, serving between 1989 and 1992. Elected at the 1989 general election to the inaugural multi-member single electorate unicameral Australian Capital Territory Legislative Assembly representing, initially, the No Self-Government Party, Prowse then sat as an independent, before joining the Liberal Party.

== Biography ==
Born in Cairns, Queensland, Prowse was educated at the Royal Melbourne Institute of Technology where he graduated with an Associate Diploma in Electrical Engineering and worked as an electrical fitter and mechanic, and later as an electrical engineer with the Royal Australian Air Force. Prowse rose through the Air Force ranks to become an Engineer Officer (Instrumentation) before retiring with the rank of Squadron Leader after twenty years service. Prowse retrained as a naturopath and rose to political prominence as an anti-water fluoridation activist.

Prowse was elected on a ticket of No Self-Government, he was ultimately successful, along with three other candidates of the Party. On 3 December 1989, Prowse, together with Duby and Maher formed the Independents Group. However, Prowse left this group on 31 July 1990 and sat out the remainder of his term as a member of the Liberal Party. At the first meeting of the Legislative Assembly, held on 11 May 1989, some eight weeks after the election, following the swearing in of the elected members, the next item of business was the election of a Presiding Officer. Following a ballot of members of the Assembly, Prowse was elected as the Presiding Officer. The Assembly subsequently resolved that the title of the Presiding Officer be Speaker of the Australian Capital Territory Legislative Assembly. Prowse held this title during the term of his first Assembly; and did not seek re-election at the 1992 general election.

During his term in office, Prowse travelled to Thailand where he was bitten by a holiday resort monkey; and later told a press conference he feared that he might have contracted the rabies virus.

Australian Capital Territory Legislative Assembly
New title	Member of the ACT Legislative Assembly; 1989–1992; Served alongside: Berry, Collaery, Connolly, Duby, Follett, Grassby, Humphries, Jensen, Kaine, Kinloch, Maher, Moore, Nolan, Stefaniak, Stevenson, Wood, Whalan	Succeeded by Multi-member single constituency
Political offices
New title	Speaker of the Australian Capital Territory Legislative Assembly; 1989–1992	Succeeded by Roberta McRae
