= Norm Jensen =

Australian politician (born 1945)

Member of the ACT Legislative Assembly
- In office 8 May 1989 – 15 February 1992 Serving with Berry, Collaery, Connolly, Duby, Follett, Grassby, Humphries, Kaine, Kinloch, Maher, Moore, Nolan, Prowse, Stefaniak, Stevenson, Whalan/Connolly, Wood
- Succeeded by: Multi-member single constituency

Personal details
- Born: Norman Arthur Jensen; 24 November 1945 (age 80) Lowood, Queensland
- Party: Residents Rally
- Children: 2
- Education: Australian National University
- Occupation: Army officer; bank officer; politician

Military service
- Allegiance: Australia
- Branch/service: Australian Army

Norman Arthur Jensen (born 24 November 1945), a former Australian politician, was a member of the first multi-member single electorate unicameral Australian Capital Territory Legislative Assembly representing the Residents Rally party, serving between 1989 and 1992.

== Biography ==
Born in Lowood, Queensland, Jensen was educated at Ipswich Grammar School and the Australian National University where he graduated with a Bachelor of Arts in 1988. He worked as a bank officer in the National Australia Bank and served in the Australian Army for 22 years after being called up for National Service in April 1966. A graduate of the Officer Training Unit in 1966 he graduated into the Royal Australian Infantry Corps serving in South Vietnam with the 2nd and 3rd Battalions of the Royal Australian Regiment in 1967–68. He later transferred to the Australian Intelligence Corp and reached the rank of Major. On retiring from the Army in 1988, Jensen continued to be active in community affairs through representation on Parents and Citizens Associations in schools located at Hawker, Wanniassa and Erindale; serving on the Tuggeranong Community Council; and through membership of the Tuggeranong Apex Club, and the Board of the YMCA of Canberra. Since retiring to the Sunshine Coast in 2004 he has become active as a member of Lions Clubs International and was elected to the position of District Governor for District 201Q3 in 2016–2017.

Jensen was elected at the 1989 general election and unsuccessfully sought re-election at the 1992 general election. After his term of office ended, Jensen was employed in the Australian Public Service until his retirement to the Sunshine Coast in 2004.

Australian Capital Territory Legislative Assembly
| New title | Member of the ACT Legislative Assembly; 1989–1992; Served alongside: Berry, Collaery, Connolly, Duby, Follett, Grassby, Humphries, Kaine, Kinloch, Maher, Moore, Nolan, Prowse, Stefaniak, Stevenson, Whalan/Connolly, Wood | Multi-member single constituency |
