= Bernard Collaery =

Australian politician and lawyer (born 1944)

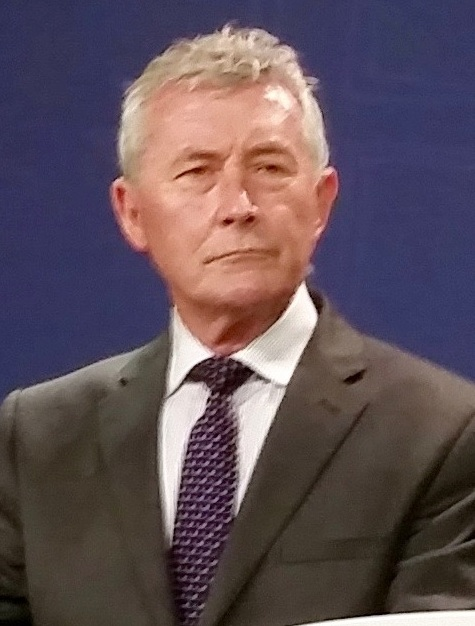
- Collaery in 2015

2nd Deputy Chief Minister of the Australian Capital Territory
- In office 7 December 1989 – 29 May 1991
- Preceded by: Paul Whalan
- Succeeded by: Wayne Berry

2nd Attorney-General of the Australian Capital Territory
- In office 7 December 1989 – 29 May 1991
- Preceded by: Rosemary Follett
- Succeeded by: Terry Connolly

Member of Australian Capital Territory Legislative Assembly
- In office 4 March 1989 – 15 February 1992

Personal details
- Born: Bernard Joseph Edward Collaery; 12 October 1944 (age 82) Caversham, England, United Kingdom
- Party: Residents Rally
- Spouse: Ann McHugh
- Children: 4
- Education: Sydney Law School
- Profession: Barrister; Solicitor; Politician

Bernard Joseph Edward Collaery (born 12 October 1944) is an Australian barrister, lawyer and former politician. Collaery was a member of the Australian Capital Territory's first Legislative Assembly for the Residents Rally party, from 1989 to 1992. He served as Deputy Chief Minister and Attorney-General from 1989 to 1991 in the Kaine Alliance Government.

In June 2018, the Commonwealth Director of Public Prosecutions charged Collaery under the National Security Information (NSI) Act with disclosing protected intelligence information. The case relates to the Australia–East Timor spying scandal, in which the Australian government bugged Timor-Leste offices in order to gain an advantage during commercial negotiations to carve up the resource-rich Timor Sea. However, in July 2022, the charges were waived by Attorney-General Mark Dreyfus.

== Early life ==
Collaery was born in Caversham, England, four months after his father, Flying Officer Edward Francis Collaery (RAAF) was killed in action. Collaery arrived in Australia in 1945 and was educated at the Christian Brothers College in Wollongong, New South Wales and at the Sydney Law School at the University of Sydney where he graduated with a Bachelor of Laws.

== Political career ==
Prior to entering politics, Collaery was a First Secretary in the Australian Embassy in France.

Collaery was elected to the Assembly at its first general election, held in 1989 and was leader of the Residents Rally Party, "a community-based urban green party". The life of the first Assembly, a multi-member single electorate unicameral body, was characterised by a hung parliament and significant political instability. Confidence was waning in the minority Follett Labor government. On 5 December 1989, Collaery moved a motion in the Assembly:

That this Assembly no longer has confidence in the Chief Minister of the ACT and the minority Labor Government and has confidence in the ability of Mr Kaine to form a government.

— Bernard Collaery, 5 December 1989.

The vote was resolved in the affirmative (10 votes to 7 votes), and Trevor Kaine was elected as Chief Minister as leader of an Alliance Government, comprising members of the Liberal Party and the Residents Rally. Collaery was subsequently appointed Deputy Chief Minister and Attorney-General in the Kaine Liberal government with responsibility for welfare and community services; housing; sport and recreation; and youth.

On 29 May 1991, Kaine announced to the Assembly that members of Residents Rally had met the previous evening and decided to advise the Chief Minister that they wanted a review of some planning decisions relating to ACT Government school sites that had been taken without the involvement of Collaery as the Deputy Chief Minister and Leader of the Rally. Those concerns had been conveyed to the Chief Minister in a letter delivered on 28 May 1991, which indicated that if the Chief Minister tabled variations to the plan, the Residents Rally members would be forced to vote against them. That account of events was supported by comments from Rally member Dr Hector Kinloch. The debate that followed showed that Collaery had been removed from his position as Deputy Chief Minister and Attorney General because he and the two remaining Rally members in the Assembly (Norm Jensen and Dr Hector Kinloch) could not support planning decisions affecting school sites. Comments by Mr Duby, one of the three ministers involved in the decisions in Collaery's absence, confirmed that account of the reason for the fall of the Alliance Government.

On 6 June 1991, a motion of no confidence in Kaine, as Chief Minister, was passed, with Collaery voting in favour. Rosemary Follett resumed the Chief Ministership, and Collaery sat on the backbenches. He was unsuccessful in seeking re-election to the Assembly at the 1992 general election.

In the 1993 federal election, Collaery was an independent candidate for election to the Australian Senate, representing the Australian Capital Territory, but was unsuccessful.

== Legal career ==
Collaery is the principal of Collaery Lawyers, a Canberra-based law firm with an international law division embracing international maritime and treaty law, refugee and civil rights law. The civil division embraces catastrophe law, principally catastrophic personal injury cases and high level dependency claims arising from catastrophic multi-victim cases, and medical negligence. The criminal division embraces all forms of trial work including coronial law. Collaery has appeared as counsel in various jurisdictions.

As a barrister, Collaery has represented plaintiffs in a number of high-profile cases, including:

- 1997 Thredbo landslide – Coronial inquiry – representing the families of the deceased
- 2003 Canberra bushfires – ACT Supreme Court compensation – representing various landholders
- Royal Canberra Hospital implosion – damages claim on behalf of the family of the deceased
- Compensation case where a man suffering a psychotic episode was shot by police and as a result became quadraplegic. The ACT Supreme Court awarded negligence damages against the police officer, the Australian Federal Police and ACT Mental Health

== Witness K trial ==
Collaery has represented the interests of the people of Timor-Leste over a long period of time. Collaery advocated on behalf of Timor-Leste and was legal advisor to the National Congress for Timorese Reconstruction (CNRT) in the critical period up until formal independence in 2002. In 2013 Collaery said that two agents from the Australian Security Intelligence Organisation raided his Canberra office and seized electronic and paper files. Collaery was representing a witness in a case brought by the Timor-Leste government against the Australian Government over the bugging of the Timor-Leste cabinet offices during the negotiations for a petroleum and gas treaty in 2004. The case was before the Permanent Court of Arbitration in The Hague in the Netherlands. The Australian Attorney-General, George Brandis, confirmed that he authorised a request by ASIO for a search warrant on Collaery's office, to protect Australia's national security. In March 2014, the International Court of Justice (ICJ) ordered Australia to seal documents and data seized by ASIO in the raid on Collaery's office. The material related to the Timor Sea Treaty negotiations between East Timor and Australia and included legal documents, electronic files and a statement by a former ASIS agent alleging that Australia eavesdropped on East Timor during negotiations. This was the first time the court had imposed restrictions on the spy agencies of a Five Eyes state.

In June 2018, the Commonwealth Director of Public Prosecutions filed criminal charges against Collaery and his client, known as "Witness K", in the Australia–East Timor spying scandal. Collaery and "Witness K" were accused of conspiring to communicate secret information to the Government of Timor-Leste some time between May 2008 and May 2013. Collaery was also accused of sharing information with ABC journalists about the 2004 bugging operation. Former Victorian premier and adviser to Timor-Leste, Steve Bracks called the prosecution "political". One of Australia's most senior lawyers, Nicholas Cowdery QC, questioned whether the prosecution was in the public interest and described the long delay between the 2013 raid and the prosecution as highly unusual.

In a court hearing on 6 August 2019 Collaery pleaded not guilty to all charges. "Witness K" said that he would plead guilty to breaching the Intelligence Services Act, however details of his plea were to be negotiated with the prosecution.

On 26 August 2019, the ABC aired a Four Corners report entitled "Secrets, Spies and Trials", which examined the Witness K trial. The report found that the cause of the delay in bringing charges against "Witness K" and Collaery was the reluctance of former attorney-general George Brandis to give consent to the prosecution. His consent was necessary due to the nature of the charges. Brandis still had not given his approval when he stood down in 2017 but his successor, Christian Porter, gave consent to prosecute within six months of taking office. The Four Corners report also contained an interview with former prime minister of Timor-Leste, Xanana Gusmão, who said he would give evidence in court on behalf of "Witness K" and Collaery if their prosecution was not a secret trial. He said his evidence would likely embarrass previous Australian governments.

The prosecution of Collaery and "Witness K" is under the National Security Information (NSI) Act which was introduced in 2004 to deal with classified and sensitive material in court cases. The NSI Act allows certain evidence and information to be heard in a closed court. When the parties to a case cannot agree on what is of national security importance and what is not, a court must decide. The Four Corners report revealed that Christian Porter has issued a secret certificate limiting the disclosure of certain information and evidence in court that is considered prejudicial to national security. Collaery said that the use of the Act had interfered with his defence and ability to instruct his lawyers, as he was not sure what could be revealed in court and was restricted in what he could tell his lawyers.

In June 2020, the ACT Supreme Court held a week-long closed hearing to determine which material would be considered classified during the trial. Justice David Mossop ruled in the government's favour and decided that the material identified by the Attorney-General as sensitive should remain classified in Collaery's future trial. As a result, part of Collaery's trial will take place in secret.

Attorney-General Porter revealed in Parliament that "[a]s at 3 June 2020, external legal costs incurred by the Commonwealth in the prosecutions of Witness K and Mr Bernard Collaery total approximately $2,063,442.86".

In June 2021, Witness K pleaded guilty to a charge of conspiring to reveal classified information and was given a three month suspended sentence. Gregory Stretton SC, a senior ACT barrister, said that the legal profession had displayed "shameful apathy" about Collaery's prosecution.

Collaery appealed against the June 2020 decision of the ACT Supreme Court to hear some matters in a closed court. In October 2021, the ACT Court of Appeal ruled that those matters should be heard in open court. Chief Justice Helen Murrell said that the risk that disclosure would damage national security was outweighed by the "very real risk of damage to public confidence in the administration of justice if the evidence could not be publicly disclosed". Murrell said "the open hearing of criminal trials was important because it deterred political prosecutions, allowed the public to scrutinise the actions of prosecutors, and permitted the public to properly assess the conduct of the accused person". Collaery's appeal also involved some "judge-only evidence" which Collaery and his lawyers had not seen due to secrecy status. The Court of Appeal asked Justice Mossop to determine whether to accept this material as part of the trial. The Australian government asked that the Court of Appeal's reasons be redacted prior to being released to the public. The government also asked to be allowed to introduce, into the eventual trial, evidence that Collaery would not be allowed to see. When Chief Justice Helen Murrell declined the Australian government's request that some of the reasons for the judgement be redacted, the government asked the High Court for special leave to appeal against that decision.

Collaery's lawyers who included Bret Walker SC, Phillip Bolton SC, Chris Ward SC instructed by Gilbert & Tobin subpoenaed documents from ASIS, the Office of National Intelligence, the Department of Prime Minister and Cabinet and the Department of Foreign Affairs and Trade. The Commonwealth opposed the release of the documents and in May 2022, Justice Mossop set aside Collaery's subpoenas after deciding that the legality of the ASIS operation was irrelevant to the case.

Before Justice Mossop's decision could be tested on appeal the indictments against Collaery were dropped on 7 July 2022 by new Attorney-General Mark Dreyfus SC using his reserve powers in the Judiciary Act 1903. Four years had been taken up on pre-trial hearings about the level of secrecy that would apply to his trial.

The ACT Court of Appeal published previously secret judgments in the case, with some redactions, in January 2024.

== Writing ==
Collaery has written a book, Oil Under Troubled Water: Australia's Timor Sea Intrigue published by Melbourne University Publishing in 2020. Its subject is Australia's relations with Timor-Leste since World War II. According to the publisher and CEO of Melbourne University Publishing, Dr Nathan Hollier, it raises important questions about "the integrity of systems of government in Australia". The Australian Government Solicitor sent Collaery a letter dated 2 March 2018 in which it provided a warning that, if he disclosed secret information about the Australian Secret Intelligence Service (ASIS) in his book, he could face "a maximum penalty of 10 years' imprisonment". The letter points out that Collaery is bound by the provisions of the Intelligence Services Act (2001) due to his arrangement with ASIS that was made in order for him to represent "Witness K". The letter was sent at the request of the Director-General of ASIS. MUP went ahead with publication without challenge from the Commonwealth.

== See also ==
- Australia–East Timor relations
- Treaty on Certain Maritime Arrangements in the Timor Sea
- David McBride - Australian whistleblower
- Witness J - former Australian intelligence officer charged and gaoled in a secret trial under the National Security Information (NSI) Act

Australian Capital Territory Legislative Assembly
New title	Member of the ACT Legislative Assembly; 1989–1992; Served alongside: Berry, Connolly, Duby, Follett, Grassby, Humphries, Jensen, Kaine, Kinloch, Maher, Moore, Nolan, Prowse, Stefaniak, Stevenson, Wood, Whalan	Multi-member constituency
Political offices
Preceded by Paul Whalan	Deputy Chief Minister of the Australian Capital Territory; 1989–1991	Succeeded by Wayne Berry
Preceded by Rosemary Follett	Attorney-General of the Australian Capital Territory; 1989–1991	Succeeded by Terry Connolly
Preceded by Ellnor Grassby	Minister for Housing and Community Services; 1989–1991	Succeeded by Terry Connolly
