= 1995 Australian Capital Territory election =

- 18 February 1995

All 17 seats of the Australian Capital Territory Legislative Assembly 9 seats needed for a majority
- Opinion polls
- Turnout: 89.5 (▼0.8 pp)
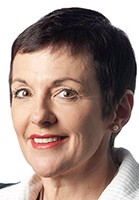

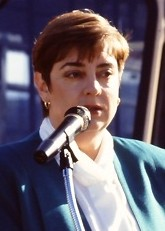
	First party	Second party	Third party
			GRN
Leader	Kate Carnell	Rosemary Follett	No leader
Party	Liberal	Labor	Greens
Leader since	21 April 1993	17 December 1988	N/A
Leader's seat	Molonglo	Molonglo	N/A
Last election	6 seats	8 seats	Did not contest
Seats won	7	6	2
Seat change	▲1	▼2	▲2
Primary vote	66,895	52,276	14,967
Percentage	40.5%	31.6%	9.1%
Swing	▲11.5	▼8.3	▲9.1%
- Results by electorate
Chief Minister before election
Rosemary Follett
Labor
Resulting Chief Minister
Kate Carnell
Liberal

The 1995 Australian Capital Territory election was held on 18 February 1995 to elect all 17 members of the Australian Capital Territory Legislative Assembly. A referendum on entrenching the ACT's electoral system was also held alongside the election.

Like the 1989 and 1992 elections, the result was another hung parliament. However, the Liberal Party were able to form government with the support of Michael Moore and Paul Osborne. Liberal leader Kate Carnell was elected chief minister at the first sitting of the third Assembly on 9 March 1995.

This was the first time the Legislative Assembly used single transferable voting, following the results of the 1992 electoral system referendum. Canberra had been divided into three multi-member district instead of the previous single at-large district.

This was also the first time at an Australian federal, state or territory election that the leaders of both major parties have been female. This would not occur again until the 2020 Queensland state election.

== Key dates ==
- Close of party registration: 12 January 1995
- Pre-election period commenced/nominations opened: 13 January 1995
- Rolls closed: 20 January 1995
- Nominations closed: 26 January 1995
- Nominations declared/ballot paper order determined: 27 January 1995
- Pre-poll voting commenced: 30 January 1995
- Polling day: 18 February 1995
- Poll declared: 2 March 1995

== Candidates ==
Sitting members at the time of the election are listed in bold. Tickets that elected at least one MLA are highlighted in the relevant colour. Successful candidates are indicated by an asterisk (*).

=== Brindabella ===
Five seats were up for election.

Labor candidates	Liberal candidates	Greens candidates	Democrats candidates
Eva Cawthorne; **Annette Ellis**; Steve Whan; Andrew Whitecross*; **Bill Wood***	Sandie Brooke; **Tony De Domenico***; **Trevor Kaine***; Louise Littlewood; Brian Lowe	Julie McInness; Andrew Parratt; Liz Stephens	Charlie Bell; Lyn Forceville
Moore candidates	Smokers candidates	Ungrouped	
Nick Isaacson; Stephanie Isaacson	Keith Dencio; Stan Kowalski	Janice Ferguson (Ind); Margaret Kobier (Ind); Paul Osborne* (Ind); Tony Savage (Ind)	

=== Ginninderra ===
Five seats were up for election.

Labor candidates	Liberal candidates	Greens candidates	Democrats candidates
**Wayne Berry***; **Ellnor Grassby**; **Roberta McRae***; Jacqueline Shea; Fiona Wilson	Lyle Dunne; Martin Gordon; Cheryl Hill; Harold Hird*; **Bill Stefaniak***	Gary Corr; Lucy Horodny*; Michelle Rielly	Peter Granleese; Peter Main
Moore candidates	Smokers candidates	Ungrouped	
Graeme Evans; **Helen Szuty**	Donovan Ballard; Lorraine Bevan	Kevin Connor (Ind)	

=== Molonglo ===
Seven seats were up for election.

Labor candidates	Liberal candidates	Greens candidates	Democrats candidates
**Terry Connolly***; Simon Corbell; **Rosemary Follett***; **David Lamont**; Marion Reilly; Michael Wilson; Silvia Zamora	Greg Aouad; David Ash; **Kate Carnell***; **Greg Cornwell***; **Gary Humphries***; Lucinda Spier; Gwen Wilcox	Natasha Davis; Shane Rattenbury; Kerrie Tucker*	Nicola Appleyard; Greg Kramer
Moore candidates	Smokers candidates	Ungrouped	
Mark Dunstone; **Michael Moore***; Tona Ven Raay	John McMahon; John Reavell	Mike Boland (Ind); Arthur Burns; Allison Dellit; Terry De Luca	Alex Middleton; Regina Slazenger (Ind); Fred Weston (Ind)

== Results ==
Party	Votes	%	+/–	Seats	+/–
Liberal	66,895	40.48	▲11.45	7	▲1
Labor	52,276	31.63	▼8.29	6	▼2
Greens	14,967	9.06	New	2	New
Moore Independents	11,645	7.05	▲1.45	1	▲1
Independents	9,260	5.60	▲4.14	1	▲1
Democrats	6,457	3.91	▼0.56	0	0
Smokers Are Voters and Civil Rights	3,770	2.28	New	0	New
Total	165,270	100.00	–	17	–
Valid votes	165,270	93.76			
Invalid/blank votes	10,994	6.24	▼0.2		
Total votes	176,264	100.00	–		
Registered voters/turnout	196,959	89.49	▼0.8		

Results by electorate
	Brindabella			Ginninderra			Molonglo		
Party	Votes	%	Seats	Votes	%	Seats	Votes	%	Seats
Liberal	18,494	37.1	2	19,507	40.7	2	28,894	42.9	3
Labor	15,758	31.6	2	15,693	32.7	2	20,825	30.9	2
Greens	3,965	8.0	0	4,176	8.7	1	6,826	10.1	1
Moore Independents	1,907	3.8	0	3,837	8.0	0	5,901	8.8	1
Independent	6,779	13.6	1	1,059	2.2	0	1,422	2.1	0
Democrats	1,878	3.8	0	2,420	5.1	0	2,159	3.2	0
Smokers Are Voters And Civil Rights	1,116	2.2	0	1,247	2.6	0	1,407	2.1	0

Distribution of seats
Electorate	Seats held	
Brindabella	I	
Ginninderra		
Molonglo		M

I - Independent politician
M - Moore Independents

== Opinion polling ==
=== Voting intention ===
Date	Firm	Interview mode	Sample size	Primary vote							
Date	Firm	Interview mode	Sample size	LIB	ALP	GRN	MMIG	DEM	SMO	OTH	UND
18 February 1995	1995 election	—	176,264	40.5%	31.6%	9.1%	7.1%	3.9%	2.3%	5.6%	—
8−14 February 1995	Canberra Times/Datacol	Telephone	1278	26.2%	23.8%	6.4%	4.9%	3.5%	0.9%	2.4%	31.9%
28 January−7 February 1995	Canberra Times/Datacol	Telephone	916	22%	26%	5%	4%	3%	1%	2%	36%
21 August−20 September 1994	Canberra Times/Datacol	Telephone	964	32%	36%	1%	3%	1%	—N/a	6% (Note: The Abolish Self Government Coalition had 1% and "Other Party/Independent) had 5%.)	21%
15 February 1992	1992 election	—	166,467	29.0%	39.9%	—	5.6%	4.5%	—	21.0%	—

==== Brindabella ====
Date	Firm	Interview mode	Sample size	Primary vote							
Date	Firm	Interview mode	Sample size	LIB	ALP	GRN	MMIG	DEM	SMO	OTH	UND
18 February 1995	1995 election	—	49,897	37.1%	31.6%	8.0%	3.8%	3.8%	2.2%	13.6%	—
8−14 February 1995	Canberra Times/Datacol	Telephone	1278	25%	23%	5%	4%	3%	2%	6%	32%
28 January−7 February 1995	Canberra Times/Datacol	Telephone	916	19%	29%	4%	2%	2%	1%	6%	39%
21 August−20 September 1994	Canberra Times/Datacol	Telephone	964	37%	33%	0%	2%	1%	—N/a	6% (Note: The Abolish Self Government Coalition had 1% and "Other Party/Independent) had 5%.)	22%

==== Ginninderra ====
Date	Firm	Interview mode	Sample size	Primary vote							
Date	Firm	Interview mode	Sample size	LIB	ALP	GRN	MMIG	DEM	SMO	OTH	UND
18 February 1995	1995 election	—	47,939	32.7%	40.7%	8.7%	8.0%	5.1%	2.6%	2.2%	—
8−14 February 1995	Canberra Times/Datacol	Telephone	1278	23%	25%	4%	6%	4%	1%	1%	35%
28 January−7 February 1995	Canberra Times/Datacol	Telephone	916	22%	24%	5%	4%	4%	1%	2%	39%
21 August−20 September 1994	Canberra Times/Datacol	Telephone	964	29%	36%	0%	3%	0%	—N/a	6% (Note: The Abolish Self Government Coalition had 0% and "Other Party/Independent) had 6%.)	24%

==== Molonglo ====
Date	Firm	Interview mode	Sample size	Primary vote							
Date	Firm	Interview mode	Sample size	LIB	ALP	GRN	MMIG	DEM	SMO	OTH	UND
18 February 1995	1995 election	—	67,434	42.9%	30.9%	10.1%	8.8%	3.2%	2.1%	2.1%	—
8−14 February 1995	Canberra Times/Datacol	Telephone	1278	29%	23%	9%	5%	3%	0%	1%	30%
28 January−7 February 1995	Canberra Times/Datacol	Telephone	916	25%	26%	7%	5%	5%	0%	0%	31%
21 August−20 September 1994	Canberra Times/Datacol	Telephone	964	29%	39%	2%	5%	2%	—N/a	5% (Note: The Abolish Self Government Coalition had 1% and "Other Party/Independent) had 4%.)	19%

=== Preferred chief minister ===
Date	Firm	Interview mode	Sample size	Carnell	Follett	Don't know				
Date	Firm	Interview mode	Sample size	8−14 February 1995	Canberra Times/Datacol	Telephone	1278	36%	38%	26%
28 January−7 February 1995	Canberra Times/Datacol	Telephone	916	39%	36%	25%				
21 August−20 September 1994	Canberra Times/Datacol	Telephone	964	39%	36%	26%				

=== Leadership approval ratings ===
==== Rosemary Follett (Labor) ====
Date	Firm	Interview mode	Sample size	Approval rating		Performance rating				
Date	Firm	Interview mode	Sample size	Approve	Disapprove	VB	B	M	G	VG
28 January−7 February 1995	Canberra Times/Datacol	Telephone	916	—N/a	—N/a	13%	19%	37%	25%	6%

==== Kate Carnell (Liberal) ====
Date	Firm	Interview mode	Sample size	Approval rating		Performance rating				
Date	Firm	Interview mode	Sample size	Approve	Disapprove	VB	B	M	G	VG
28 January−7 February 1995	Canberra Times/Datacol	Telephone	916	—N/a	—N/a	10%	18%	38%	28%	6%

==== Michael Moore (MMIG) ====
Date	Firm	Interview mode	Sample size	Approval rating		Performance rating				
Date	Firm	Interview mode	Sample size	Approve	Disapprove	VB	B	M	G	VG
28 January−7 February 1995	Canberra Times/Datacol	Telephone	916	—N/a	—N/a	20%	21%	40%	16%	4%

== See also ==
- Members of the Australian Capital Territory Legislative Assembly, 1995–1998
- First Carnell Ministry
- List of Australian Capital Territory elections
