= Wayne Berry =

Australian politician (born 1942)

Member of the ACT Legislative Assembly
- In office 4 March 1989 – 18 February 1995 Serving with Collaery, Connolly, Duby, Follett, Grassby, Humphries, Jensen, Kaine, Kinloch, Maher, Moore, Nolan, Prowse, Stefaniak, Stevenson, Wood, Whalan
- Preceded by: new constituency
- Succeeded by: multi-member multiple constituencies
- In office 18 February 1995 – 18 October 2008 Serving with McRae/Stanhope, Hird/Dunne, Stefaniak, Horodny/Rugendyke/Dundas/Porter
- Preceded by: multi-member single constituency
- Succeeded by: Meredith Hunter
- Constituency: Ginninderra

4th Speaker of the Australian Capital Territory Legislative Assembly
- In office 12 November 2001 – 18 October 2008
- Preceded by: Greg Cornwell
- Succeeded by: Shane Rattenbury

8th Opposition Leader of the Australian Capital Territory
- In office 19 August 1997 – 20 February 1998
- Preceded by: Andrew Whitecross
- Succeeded by: Jon Stanhope

3rd Deputy Chief Minister of the Australian Capital Territory
- In office 18 June 1991 – 13 April 1994
- Preceded by: Bernard Collaery
- Succeeded by: David Lamont

Personal details
- Born: 14 November 1942 (age 84) Sydney, New South Wales
- Party: Labor Party
- Spouse: Rhonda Berry
- Children: Yvette Berry
- Occupation: Fire officer; union official

Wayne Bruce Berry (born 14 November 1942) is an Australian former politician who was a member of the unicameral Australian Capital Territory Legislative Assembly from 1989 to 2008, representing the electorate of Ginninderra (from 1995 to 2008) for the Labor Party. Berry served as Deputy Chief Minister from 1991 to 1994, Leader of the Opposition from 1997 to 1998 and Speaker of the Assembly from 2001 to 2008.

== Early years and background ==
Berry was born in Sydney and educated in Taree, New South Wales.

Prior to entering politics, Berry was active in the union movement and a member of the Labor Party's left faction. He served in the New South Wales Fire Service from 1963 until 1972 and the Australian Capital Territory Fire Brigade from 1972 until 1989. Berry is a Graduate Member of the Institute of Fire Engineers (UK). He was a member of the Federal Firefighters Union, serving as National President between 1986 and 1989.

== Political career ==
Berry was elected to the first Legislative Assembly, initially as a member in a multi-member single electorate covering the entire Australian Capital Territory (ACT) at the 1989 ACT general election and re-elected at the 1992 general election. Berry stood for the electorate of Ginninderra at the 1995 general election and was re-elected; and again at the 1998, 2001, and 2004 elections.

He was the first Minister for Community Services and Health in the Follett-led Labor government in a hung parliament. After a vote of no confidence was passed on Follett, Berry was forced to cross-benches. Surprisingly, Follett's deputy, Paul Whalan resigned from the Assembly in November 1990 and Berry became Follet's deputy. In 1991, when Follett succeeded Trevor Kaine as Chief Minister, Berry again assumed responsibilities as Minister for Health and became Deputy Chief Minister. The responsibilities of industrial relations and sport were added, and he held all three portfolios until the a ministerial reshuffle in 1994 when David Lamont replaced Berry in the ministry.

During his time in the Assembly, Berry campaigned strongly on pro-choice and abortion decriminalisation initiatives. In the early years of the Assembly, anti-abortion activism was led by Paul Osborne and Dave Rugendyke. The Assembly legislated that a 72-hour "cooling-off" period was required before a woman who requested an abortion could access one. Additionally, "information" that must be provided to women considering abortions was significantly weighted in favour of the decision to continue with a pregnancy instead of having an abortion. Berry eventually successfully lobbied for abortion to be decriminalised in 2002.

He became leader of the ALP in 1997 and his leadership ended when he led the party to defeat at the 1998 election. He and his predecessor Andrew Whitecross are the only ALP leaders who did not become Chief Ministers.

Berry went on to serve as Speaker of the Legislative Assembly between 2001 and 2008. As Speaker, in 2006, he met with the Australian Governor-General, Major General Michael Jeffery and urged him not to disallow the ACT's civil union legislation. Berry asked that the Commonwealth suggest amendments that the ACT Legislative Assembly could make so that the law was acceptable to the Federal Government. The Governor-General passed the request to the Commonwealth Government. Two hours later, the Commonwealth Attorney-General Philip Ruddock and Minister for Territories Jim Lloyd arrived at Government House and together with the Governor-General moved to disallow the ACT laws permitting civil unions.

Berry retired from politics at the 2008 election. His daughter Yvette was elected to the ACT Legislative Assembly at the 2012 election and in 2016 she became Deputy Chief Minister, a position that Wayne himself held between 1991 and 1994.

Australian Capital Territory Legislative Assembly
New title	Member of the ACT Legislative Assembly; 1989–1995; Served alongside: Collaery, Connolly, Duby, Follett, Grassby, Humphries, Jensen, Kaine, Kinloch, Maher, Moore, Nolan, Prowse, Stefaniak, Stevenson, Wood, Whalan	Multi-member multiple constituencies
New title	Member for Ginninderra in the ACT Legislative Assembly; 1995–2008; Served alongside: McRae/Stanhope, Hird/Dunne, Stefaniak, Horodny/Rugendyke/Dundas/Porter	Succeeded by Meredith Hunter
Political offices
Preceded by Bernard Collaery	Deputy Chief Minister of the Australian Capital Territory; 1991 – 1994	Succeeded by David Lamont
Preceded by Greg Cornwell	Speaker of the Australian Capital Territory Legislative Assembly; 2001 – 2008	Succeeded by Shane Rattenbury
Party political offices
Preceded by Andrew Whitecross	Opposition Leader of the Australian Capital Territory; 1997 – 1998	Succeeded by Jon Stanhope
