= Ellnor Grassby =

Australian politician (born 1937)

Minister for Housing and Urban Services
- In office 16 May 1989 – 5 December 1989
- Preceded by: new Ministry
- Succeeded by: Trevor Kaine

Member of the ACT Legislative Assembly
- In office 4 March 1989 – 18 February 1995 Serving with Berry, Collaery, Connolly, Duby, Follett, Humphries, Jensen, Kaine, Kinloch, Maher, Moore, Nolan, Prowse, Stefaniak, Stevenson, Wood, Whalan
- Succeeded by: Multi-member multiple constituencies

Personal details
- Born: Ellnor Judith Louez; 14 January 1937 (age 89) Griffith, New South Wales
- Party: Labor Party
- Spouse: Al Grassby AM
- Children: Gabriella Davis
- Occupation: Politician

Ellnor Judith Grassby (née Louez; born 14 January 1937) is a former Australian politician who served as a member of the multi-member single constituency unicameral Australian Capital Territory Legislative Assembly, representing the Labor Party between 1989 and 1995. Grassby served as Minister for Housing and Urban Services in the First Follett Ministry.

== Biography ==
Born in Griffith, New South Wales, in 1962 Ellnor Louez married Al Grassby, who was elected as the Labor Member for Murrumbidgee in the New South Wales Legislative Assembly in 1965, before being elected as the federal Labor Member for Riverina in the House of Representatives in 1969. Prior to entering politics, Ellnor Grassby was employed in the accreditation of nurses, owned and managed hotels, and was a volunteer fundraiser and board member for a number of non-profit organisations.

Ellnor Grassby was elected to the inaugural ACT Legislative Assembly at the 1989 general election, and re-elected to the second Assembly at the 1992 general election. Grassby contested the multi-member electorate of Ginninderra at the 1995 general election, but was unsuccessful. She served as the Minister for Housing and Urban Services in the First Follett Ministry, during 1989; however was not appointed to subsequent Labor ministries.

During 2003–2005, Grassby served on the Chief Minister's Ministerial Advisory Council on Multicultural Affairs.

She was a board member of Naming Australia Incorporated, a community organisation comprising representatives from the Spanish community, the Embassy of Spain in Australia, the business community and the ACT government who organisated celebrations for the 400th anniversary, in 2006, of Spanish contribution to the history and naming of Australia.

Following the 2005 death of Al Grassby, media reports revealed that Ellnor Grassby was aware that her husband had lovers. However, she rejected allegations that the couple had separated thirty years earlier.

== See also ==
- First Follett Ministry
- Al Grassby

Political offices
New title	Minister for Housing and Urban Services; 1989	Succeeded by Trevor Kaine
Australian Capital Territory Legislative Assembly
New title	Member of the ACT Legislative Assembly; 1989–1995; Served alongside: Berry, Collaery, Connolly, Duby, Follett, Humphries, Jensen, Kaine, Kinloch, Maher, Moore, Nolan, Prowse, Stefaniak, Stevenson, Wood, Whalan	Succeeded by Multi-member multiple constituencies
