= Speaker of the Australian Capital Territory Legislative Assembly =

Speaker of the Legislative Assembly

- Incumbent; Jeremy Hanson (Liberal) since 6 November 2024
- Appointer: Elected by the Australian Capital Territory Legislative Assembly
- Inaugural holder: David Prowse
- Formation: 11 May 1989
- Deputy: Andrew Braddock
- Salary: $103,839 (Additional salary) $292,637 (total) (Note: The Speaker receives a remuneration of $103,839 on top of the $188,798 base salary for a member of the Legislative Assembly)

The Speaker of the Australian Capital Territory Legislative Assembly is the presiding officer of the Australian Capital Territory Legislative Assembly, the unicameral legislature of the Australian Capital Territory.

The current speaker is Jeremy Hanson of the Canberra Liberals.

== Office ==
The Speaker is the head of the parliament as well as the chamber, they are responsible for governing conduct within the chamber, ensuring standing orders are followed, and disciplining members who break these rules. They are also the ceremonial representative of the Assembly as a whole.

The office of Speaker comes with a bonus salary of $103,839 on top of the $188,798 base salary already received by every member of the Legislative Assembly. Given the Speaker must be an MLA, their total salary amounts to $292,637.

== List of Speakers ==
=== Speakers ===
#	Speaker (birth–death)	Party	Term start	Term end	Time in office
	David Prowse (born 1941)	No Self Government	11 May 1989	4 December 1989	2 years, 280 days
1	David Prowse (born 1941)	Independents Group	4 December 1989	6 August 1990	2 years, 280 days
	David Prowse (born 1941)	Liberal	6 August 1990	15 February 1992	2 years, 280 days
2	Roberta McRae (born 1948)	Labor	27 March 1992	9 March 1995	2 years, 347 days
3	Greg Cornwell (1938-2025)	Liberal	9 March 1995	12 November 2001	6 years, 248 days
4	Wayne Berry (born 1942)	Labor	12 November 2001	5 November 2008	6 years, 359 days
5	Shane Rattenbury (born 1971)	Greens	5 November 2008	6 November 2012	4 years, 1 day
6	Vicki Dunne (born 1956)	Liberal	6 November 2012	31 October 2016	3 years, 360 days
7	Joy Burch	Labor	31 October 2016	6 November 2024	8 years, 6 days
9	Mark Parton (born 1966)	Liberal	6 November 2024	10 November 2025	1 year, 4 days
–	Andrew Braddock (born 1978) (acting)	Greens	10 November 2025	2 December 2025	22 days
10	Jeremy Hanson	Liberal	2 December 2025	Incumbent	349 days

=== Deputy Speakers ===
#	Speaker (birth–death)	Party	Term start	Term end	Time in office
1	Bill Stefaniak (born 1952)	Liberal	23 May 1989	15 February 1992	2 years, 268 days
2	Greg Cornwell (born 1938)	Liberal	27 March 1992	18 February 1995	2 years, 328 days
3	Roberta McRae (born 1948)	Labor	9 March 1995	21 February 1998	2 years, 349 days
4	Bill Wood (1935−2024)	Labor	19 March 1998	20 October 2001	3 years, 215 days
(2)	Greg Cornwell (1938-2025)	Liberal	12 November 2001	16 October 2004	2 years, 339 days
5	Steve Pratt (born 1949)	Liberal	4 November 2004	18 October 2008	3 years, 349 days
6	Mary Porter (born 1942)	Labor	5 November 2008	18 February 2016	7 years, 105 days
7	Joy Burch	Labor	18 February 2016	15 October 2016	240 days
8	Vicki Dunne (born 1956)	Liberal	31 October 2016	17 October 2020	3 years, 352 days
9	Mark Parton (born 1966)	Liberal	3 November 2020	6 November 2024	4 years, 3 days
5	Andrew Braddock (born 1978)	Greens	6 November 2024	Incumbent	2 years, 10 days

== See also ==
- Australian Capital Territory Legislative Assembly
