= Residents Rally =

Former political party in the Australian Capital Territory, Australia

Residents Rally Residents Rally for Canberra Inc
- Abbreviation: RR; Rally
- Leader: Bernard Collaery
- Founded: 28 October 1987; 37 years ago (as a group); 1 May 1988; 37 years ago (as a party)
- Dissolved: c. 1995; 30 years ago
- Legislative Assembly: 4 / 18 (1989)

The Residents Rally (RR), officially known as the Residents Rally for Canberra Inc and also known simply as the Rally, was an Australian political party that was active during the early years of self-government in the Australian Capital Territory (ACT). It was led by human rights lawyer Bernard Collaery, who described it as a "community-based urban green party".

The Rally was part of the Alliance government with the Liberals and the Independents Group between December 1989 and May 1991, with Collaery serving as deputy chief minister and attorney-general. After the Rally was sacked from the government, its MLAs supported a no-confidence motion which saw Labor leader Rosemary Follett return as chief minister.

After failing to win any seats at the 1992 election, the Rally faded away and disbanded in the mid-1990s without contesting the 1995 election.

== 1989 ACT general election ==
In 1989, the Australian Capital Territory was granted self-government, and elections were called for the new Legislative Assembly. While a number of local parties announced their intention to contest the elections, Residents Rally quickly emerged as one of the leading contenders. Residents Rally were formed in 1987 by Residents' Associations, anti-casino groups and the Conservation Council of the ACT. Collaery recruited eight other local identities, and while not the largest ticket, they ultimately received 9.62% of the vote. This was enough to elect four members to the Assembly - Collaery, Norm Jensen, Michael Moore and Dr Hector Kinloch, although the complex counting system meant that it took an added two months before Kinloch was confirmed as the Assembly's final member. This left them with the same numbers in the Assembly as the Liberal Party, and only one seat behind Labor. While they had not preferenced any other party, Residents Rally agreed to support a Labor government after negotiations with both major federal parties, and Labor leader Rosemary Follett became the ACT's first Chief Minister.

The four Residents Rally members were vocal in the first Assembly, and insisted that they be consulted on most issues. They set out full policies in many areas, as opposed to several of the other small parties in the ACT at the time, and attempted to build themselves into a political force. While their power in the Assembly suffered a blow when Moore clashed with Collaery and quit the party to sit as an independent in October 1989, Residents Rally still saw themselves as a player in ACT politics, and decided to make this clear.

== Liberal–Residents Rally alliance government ==
Tensions between Residents Rally and the Follett Labor government had been building for some time. The two parties had clashed over planning issues, dealings with the federal government and concerns over potential interference with the judiciary, as well as the government's support for Casino Canberra—which Residents Rally had vociferously campaigned against as part of their election platform. Finally, in December 1989, a dispute over legislation dealing with pornographic videos brought the issues to climax, and Residents Rally moved a motion of no-confidence in the Follett government. They subsequently formed a coalition government with the Liberal Party and the Independents Group—three ex-members of the No Self-Government Party. The deal saw Residents Rally leader Collaery become Deputy Chief Minister, and both Jensen and Kinloch become junior ministers in the new government.

Their new role in government gave the party significant power, and they used this, most notably to prevent what they saw as inappropriate development in a number of areas around Canberra. However, this also meant making allowances to the Liberal government's agenda, and as a result, the party decided not to oppose the government's closure of several schools and the Royal Canberra Hospital, breaking some of the promises they had made before the 1989 election. These decisions once led Labor MP Paul Whalan to compare them to the Liberals' federal coalition partner, the National Party of Australia.

Despite this, major differences began to emerge between the two parties, and in April 1991, Kinloch walked out of the coalition, though he remained a member of the party and continued to support Collaery's leadership. It was around this time that Kinloch announced that he would retire at the 1992 election, instead of running for re-election as previously announced. Only weeks later, on 29 May, the tensions between Residents Rally and the remainder of the coalition came to a head, and Liberal Chief Minister Trevor Kaine expelled Residents Rally from the government. They subsequently switched their support back to Labor, and Follett was once again installed as Chief Minister.

== 1992 ACT general election ==
When the ACT faced its second election in February 1992, both major federal parties used stability as a major campaign theme, pointing to the two mid-term switches of government, which were almost unheard of in Australia since World War II. The tactic was apparently well received amongst a public that seemed to be tired of Residents Rally playing a "kingmaker" role, and the party's vote fell to 4.56%. As a result, both remaining members, Collaery and Jensen, lost their seats. In contrast, Moore, now sitting as an independent, got an ally elected to the Assembly, and continued to hold the balance of power.

After their crushing defeat in 1992, Residents Rally fell apart, and had ceased to exist by the 1995 election. While Moore easily held his seat until his retirement in 2001, neither Residents Rally nor any of its other candidates have played any further role in ACT politics.
