= Terry Connolly =

Australian politician and judge (1958–2007)

Member of ACT Legislative Assembly
- In office 1 May 1990 – 15 February 1992 Serving with Berry, Collaery, Duby, Follett, Grassby, Humphries, Jensen, Kaine, Kinloch, Maher, Moore, Nolan, Prowse, Stefaniak, Stevenson, Wood, Whalan

Member for Molonglo
- In office 18 February 1995 – 19 February 1996 Serving with Follett, Humphries, Carnell, Cornwell, Tucker, Moore
- Preceded by: new constituency
- Succeeded by: Marion Reilly

Attorney-General of the Australian Capital Territory
- In office 29 May 1991 – 18 February 1995
- Preceded by: Bernard Collaery
- Succeeded by: Gary Humphries

Minister for Housing and Community Services
- In office 29 May 1991 – 18 February 1995
- Preceded by: Bernard Collaery
- Succeeded by: Kate Carnell

Minister for Urban Services
- In office 15 February 1992 – 18 February 1995
- Preceded by: Craig Duby
- Succeeded by: Tony De Domenico

Personal details
- Born: Terence Connolly; 14 February 1958 Adelaide, South Australia
- Died: 25 September 2007 (aged 49) Canberra
- Party: Labor Party
- Spouse: Dr Helen Watchirs
- Children: Lara and Maddy
- Education: University of Adelaide; Australian National University
- Profession: Barrister, solicitor, politician, judge

Terence (Terry) Connolly (14 February 1958 – 25 September 2007) was an Australian politician and judge.

== Early years ==
The son of an Irish bricklayer, Connolly was born in Adelaide and graduated with a Bachelor of Laws and Bachelor of Arts (both with Honours) from the University of Adelaide and a Masters in Public Law from the Australian National University. He was registered to practise as a barrister and solicitor in South Australia in 1982 and worked with Justice John Gallop. He moved to Canberra in 1983 and worked as a legal adviser in the Commonwealth departments of Attorney-General, Veterans' Affairs and Foreign Affairs. He was registered to practise in the Australian Capital Territory in 1985.

== Career ==
Connolly joined the Australian Labor Party in 1976 and was elected as South Australian President of Young Labor in 1978; and as National President in 1979.

Connolly became a Labor Member of the Australian Capital Territory Legislative Assembly in 1990 on the resignation of Paul Whalan and served as Attorney-General from 1991 to 1995. With the creation of electorates in 1995, he became a member for Molonglo. Connolly also served as Minister for Housing and Community Services from 1991 to 1995 and Minister for Urban Services from 1992 to 1995.

He resigned from the Assembly in February 1996 and was appointed Master of the Australian Capital Territory Supreme Court. Connolly was appointed a judge of the ACT Supreme Court in January 2003.

Connolly died of a heart attack while cycling atop Red Hill in Canberra; and his family carried out his wishes to donate his organs for the benefit of others. He is survived by his wife, Dr Helen Watchirs, the ACT Human Rights Commissioner and their two daughters; Lara and Maddy.

Australian Capital Territory Legislative Assembly
New title	Member of the ACT Legislative Assembly; 1990–1995; Served alongside: Berry, Collaery, Duby, Follett, Grassby, Humphries, Jensen, Kaine, Kinloch, Maher, Moore, Nolan, Prowse, Stefaniak, Stevenson, Wood, Whalan	Multi-member constituencies
New title	Member for Molonglo; 1995–1996; Served alongside: Follett, Humphries, Carnell, Cornwell, Tucker, Moore	Succeeded by Marion Reilly
Political offices
Preceded by Bernard Collaery	Attorney-General of the Australian Capital Territory; 1991–1995	Succeeded by Gary Humphries
Preceded by Bernard Collaery	Minister for Housing and Community Services; 1991–1995	Succeeded by Kate Carnell
Preceded by Craig Duby	Minister for Urban Services; 1992–1995	Succeeded by Tony De Domenico
Legal offices
Preceded by Terence Higgins	Judge of the Supreme Court of the Australian Capital Territory; 2003–2007	Succeeded by Hilary Penfold
