= Grassby =

Grassby is a surname. Notable people with the surname include:

- Al Grassby (1926–2005), Australian politician
- Bertram Grassby (1880–1953), English silent movie actor
- Ellnor Grassby (born 1937), Australian politician
