= New Conservative Group =

Former Australian political party

- Abbreviation: New Conservatives, NCG
- Founded: 1991
- Dissolved: c. 1992
- Split from: Liberal Party
- ACT Legislative Assembly: 1 / 18 (1991–1992)

The New Conservative Group (also known as the New Conservatives) was a short-lived Australian political party registered in the Australian Capital Territory. It was founded in November 1991 by Robyn Nolan, a former Liberal member of the Legislative Assembly, who had resigned from that party the previous month. Nolan had not long before been told that she would not be given a winnable position on the Liberal ticket for the forthcoming 1992 election after a round of bloodletting caused by Liberal leader Trevor Kaine reasserting control over the party.

Nolan had an interest in continuing in the Assembly, however, and founded the New Conservative Group as an alternative conservative party to enable her to do this. The party subsequently ran a four-person ticket at the 1992 election. Despite Nolan's status as a sitting MP, the party polled badly, finishing ninth overall with only 1.2% of the vote. In the aftermath of the poor election performance, and failure to even hold their only seat in the Assembly, the party disbanded, with Nolan and the other candidates bowing out of politics before the 1995 election.
