= Dennis Stevenson =

Australian politician (born 1946)

Member of ACT Legislative Assembly
- In office 8 May 1989 – 18 February 1995 Serving with Berry, Collaery, Connolly, Duby, Follett, Grassby, Humphries, Jensen, Kaine, Kinloch, Maher, Moore, Nolan, Prowse, Stefaniak, Wood, Whalan
- Preceded by: new constituency
- Succeeded by: multi-member constituencies

Personal details
- Born: Dennis Ross Stevenson; 12 November 1946 (age 79) Newcastle, New South Wales
- Party: Abolish Self-Government Coalition
- Profession: Policeman, soldier, manager, politician

Military service
- Allegiance: Australia
- Branch/service: Citizen's Military Forces
- Years of service: 1966 – 1973
- Unit: 1st/19th Battalion Royal NSW Regiment

Dennis Ross Stevenson (born 12 November 1946) is an Australian politician. He was elected in the inaugural 1989 general election to serve in the Australian Capital Territory Legislative Assembly, on a platform of abolishing self-government in the Australian Capital Territory (ACT). Stevenson was re-elected at the 1992 general election and resigned from the ACT Legislative Assembly in 1995.

== Biography ==
Stevenson was born in Newcastle, New South Wales and worked as a photogrammatist, company director, an operator of health centres and trainer in sales, marketing, public speaking and motivation. He has also worked as a life coach, business consultant, counselor and laborer. Immediately prior to his parliamentary career he served in the NSW Police Force from 1965 to 1973, primarily training personnel in intelligence matters. Stevenson served in the reserve forces of the Australian Army between 1966 and 1973.

Following his election to the ACT Legislative Assembly, Stevenson worked on many issues including abolishing the newly established self-government in the Australian Capital Territory, campaigning against the Hare-Clark voting system, for the introduction of citizens' initiated referendums, banning computer porn and the fledgling pornography industry in the ACT and other human-rights issues. After resigning from the assembly in 1995 he traveled extensively before returning to Canberra.

Since his political career Stevenson moved to Queensland and campaigned on civil-liberties issues including against the water fluoridation and highlighting the decline of Australian democracy. Stevenson was the compere at the Inverell Forum between 1992 and 2008.

Australian Capital Territory Legislative Assembly
New title	Member of the ACT Legislative Assembly; 1989–1995; Served alongside: Berry, Collaery, Connolly, Duby, Follett, Grassby, Humphries, Jensen, Kaine, Kinloch, Maher, Moore, Nolan, Prowse, Stefaniak, Wood, Whalan	Multi-member constituencies
