= Trevor Kaine =

Australian politician (1928–2008)

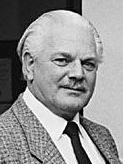
- Kaine in 1990

2nd Chief Minister of the Australian Capital Territory
- In office 5 December 1989 – 6 June 1991
- Deputy: Bernard Collaery
- Preceded by: Rosemary Follett
- Succeeded by: Rosemary Follett

Member of ACT Legislative Assembly
- In office 4 March 1989 – 18 February 1995 Serving with Berry, Collaery, Connolly, Duby, Follett, Grassby, Humphries, Jensen, Kinloch, Maher, Moore, Nolan, Prowse, Stefaniak, Stevenson, Wood, Whalan

Member of ACT Legislative Assembly
- In office 18 February 1995 – 20 October 2001 Serving with Wood, Hargreaves, Smyth, Osborne
- Succeeded by: Steve Pratt
- Constituency: Brindabella

Personal details
- Born: Trevor Thomas Kaine; 17 February 1928 Penguin, Tasmania, Australia
- Died: 3 June 2008 (aged 80)
- Party: Liberal (until 1998); Canberra Liberals (1998) (Note: This was a predecessor name to the United Canberra Party that was changed after the ACT Electoral Commission rejected the party's registration due to its name being too similar to the Liberal Party (which is today known as the Canberra Liberals).); United Canberra Party (1998–2001); Independent (from 2001)
- Cabinet: Kaine Ministry

Military service
- Allegiance: Australia
- Branch/service: Royal Australian Air Force
- Rank: Wing Commander

Trevor Thomas Kaine (17 February 1928 – 3 June 2008) was an Australian politician who served as the first male Chief Minister of the Australian Capital Territory from 1989 to 1991. Kaine was elected into a multi-member electorate in the unicameral Australian Capital Territory Legislative Assembly, from 1989 to 2001, initially as a member of the Liberal Party and later as an independent.

== Early career ==
Kaine was born in the town of Penguin in Tasmania, and was educated in Victoria and Queensland. He moved to Canberra in the 1950s whilst stationed with the Royal Australian Air Force.

== Political career ==
Kaine was a member of the ACT House of Assembly as a member for Fraser from 1975 to 1977, and again from 1985 until that House was dissolved. He was elected to the first Australian Capital Territory Legislative Assembly at the 1989 general election and, at the first sitting of the Assembly, became the first Leader of the Opposition of the ACT, leading the Liberal Party. The life of the first Assembly was characterised by a hung parliament and significant political instability. Confidence was waning in the minority Follett Labor government. On 5 December 1989, Bernard Collaery, leader of the Residents Rally group (with four members in the Assembly) moved the following motion in the Assembly:

That this Assembly no longer has confidence in the Chief Minister of the ACT and the minority Labor Government and has confidence in the ability of Mr Kaine to form a government.

The vote was resolved in the affirmative (10 votes to 7), and Kaine was elected as the second Chief Minister as leader of an Alliance Government, comprising members of both the Liberal Party and some (but not all) members of the Residents Rally in the Assembly.

On 29 May 1991, Kaine announced to the Assembly that members of the Residents Rally had met the previous evening and decided to dissolve the Alliance, due to an internal split in the Rally party, where two of the four members chose to align themselves with the Kaine government. The remaining two members chose to not align themselves with the Kaine government. On 6 June 1991, a motion of no confidence in Kaine, as Chief Minister, was passed. The Follett Labor government resumed power, and Kaine again became Leader of the Opposition.

The ACT Liberal Party lost the 1992 election, again, with a hung parliament. Kaine continued as Leader of the Opposition. In 1993, Kate Carnell took over leadership of the Liberal Party. Kaine stayed on with the Liberal Party after losing the leadership, and was appointed Urban Services Minister when the party won the 1995 election under Carnell. At the 1995 election, three multi-member electorates were created, and Kaine was one of the five representatives of the Brindabella electorate. Kaine was re-elected at the 1998 election.

== United Canberra Party ==
United Canberra party Canberra Liberals
- Leader: Trevor Kaine
- Founder: Trevor Kaine
- Founded: 28 May 1998
- Registered: 30 July 1998
- Dissolved: 30 June 2001 (deregistered)
- Split from: Liberal Party
- Legislative Assembly: 1 / 17 (1998–2001)

On 13 May 1998, he resigned from the Liberal Party and on 28 May 1998, announced his intention to form a party called Canberra Liberals. On 30 July 1998, the United Canberra Party was registered. The party was deregistered on 30 June 2001, and Kaine unsuccessfully contested the 2001 ACT election as an independent candidate.

== Life after politics ==
Trevor Kaine died on 3 June 2008, aged 80, after a long illness following a stroke he had suffered four years earlier. He was the first ACT Chief Minister to die.

== Notes ==
Political offices
Preceded by Rosemary Follett	Chief Minister of the Australian Capital Territory; 1989–1991	Succeeded by Rosemary Follett
Party political offices
Preceded by none	Opposition Leader of the Australian Capital Territory; 1989	Succeeded by Rosemary Follett
Preceded by Rosemary Follett	Opposition Leader of the Australian Capital Territory; 1991–1993	Succeeded by Kate Carnell
Australian Capital Territory Legislative Assembly
New parliament	Member for the Australian Capital Territory Legislative Assembly; 1989–1995; Served alongside: Berry, Collaery, Connolly, Duby, Follett, Grassby, Humphries, Jensen, Kinloch, Maher, Moore, Nolan, Prowse, Stefaniak, Stevenson, Wood, Whalan	Succeeded by Multi-member multiple constituencies
Preceded by Multi-member single constituency	Member for Brindabella; 1995–2001; Served alongside: Wood, Hargreaves, Smyth, Osborne	Succeeded by Steve Pratt
