= David Prowse (disambiguation) =

David Prowse MBE (1935–2020) was an English bodybuilder, weightlifter, Darth Vader actor in Star Wars and the Green Cross Man.

David Prowse may also refer to:

- David Prowse (politician) (born 1941), the first Speaker of the Australian Capital Territory Legislative Assembly
- David Prowse, a Canadian musician, drummer and vocalist for rock band Japandroids
