= Andrew Whitecross =

Australian politician

Andrew Whitecross (born 25 May 1963) is an Australian former politician who was a member of the Australian Capital Territory Legislative Assembly from 1995 to 1998, elected to the multi-member electorate of Brindabella for the Labor Party. Whitecross was elected the third ACT Legislative Assembly at the 1995 general election as a Labor member. He succeeded former Chief Minister Rosemary Follett as Leader of the Opposition in March 1996, and continued in that position until his replacement by Wayne Berry in August 1997. He recontested the seat at the 1998 general election, but was unsuccessful.

Whitecross and his successor Berry are the only ALP leaders who did not become Chief Ministers and Whitecross is the only ALP leader who did not lead the party into an election.

With a caucus of six members Whitecross was able to replace Follett as leader when he and two caucus colleagues tapped Follett on the shoulder which convinced her to stand down as leader.
