= Australian Food and Grocery Council =

Australian Food and Grocery Council (AFGC) is an independent industry association of Australia's food, drink, and grocery manufacturing sector. The (AFGC) was founded in 1995 to represent and support the food and grocery supply industry in Australia to inform government on issues facing the industry and members needs.

== Political influence ==
Past chief executive officer of the Australian Food and Grocery Council was former Liberal party politician Kate Carnell, who was Chief Minister of the Australian Capital Territory (ACT) from 1995 to 2000.

In November 2009, the AFGC successfully lobbied the coalition to exempt agriculture and food processing from their emissions trading scheme negotiations. Dr. Rosemary Stanton has argued this was a lost opportunity to reform the food industry and the health of Australians.

The AFGC has also supported advertisements for a business lobby group describing itself as "Responsible Recycling" that criticise the Northern Territory container deposit scheme as a variety of it.
