= Fair Elections Coalition =

Defunct Australian political party

- Abbreviation: FEC
- Leader: Tony Fleming
- President: Miko Kirschbaum
- Spokesperson: Moira Rowland
- Founded: 11 August 1988; 36 years ago
- Registered: 16 January 1989; 36 years ago
- Dissolved: 26 July 1991; 33 years ago
- Headquarters: 15 Grey Street; Deakin, Canberra

The Fair Elections Coalition (FEC) was an Australian political party that contested the first election for the Australian Capital Territory Legislative Assembly in 1989.

== History ==
The FEC was formed on 11 August 1988 as a lobby group in opposition to the modified D'Hondt electoral system that was introduced for the first ACT election under self-government. Under this system, any party that did not win at least 5.56% of the vote was unable to win a seat or receive preferences from other parties. The FEC also opposed single-member electoral districts, which were proposed (although failed to pass) at a 1992 referendum.

Although its members, including president Miko Kirschbaum, did not initially want to be a political party, the FEC applied for registration with the Australian Electoral Commission (AEC) on 5 January 1989 and was registered 11 days later.

In February 1989, Tony Fleming (who had planned to contest the election as part of his own "Tony Fleming Independent Group" party), former Australian Democrats candidate Julie McCarron-Benson and three members of the Rainbow Alliance joined the FEC to contest the election, in order to best maximise their chances under the D'Hondt system. This meant the Rainbow Alliance withdrew from the election as a separate party.

The FEC received second preferences from a majority of the minor parties that were contesting the election. Opinion polling published throughout the election campaign showed the party with between 1.1% and 2.8% of the vote, which was not enough to win a seat. Fleming's campaign was endorsed by Tasmanian Independent Greens MP Bob Brown, who said Fleming was "part of the fresh wave of Australian politics" and "a brilliant candidate".

The election was held on 4 March, but counting took almost two months to complete. Around three weeks after the election, Fleming conceded that he had narrowly missed out on being elected, with the FEC winning 99.92% of the quota needed and thus falling just 117 votes (or 0.08%) short of gaining a seat. This was despite Fleming having the third-highest personal vote of any candidate in the ACT.

On 26 July 1991, the FEC was deregistered by the AEC.
