= 1989 Australian Capital Territory election =

- 4 March 1989

All 17 seats in the Australian Capital Territory Legislative Assembly 9 seats needed for a majority
- Opinion polls
- Turnout: 88.8%
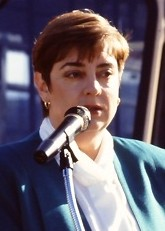

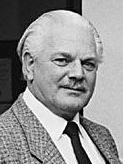

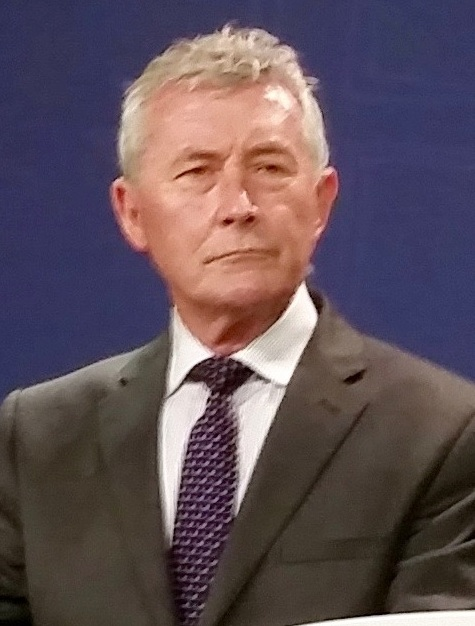
| | First party | Second party | Third party |
|---|---|---|---|
| Leader | Rosemary Follett | Trevor Kaine | Bernard Collaery |
| Party | Labor | Liberal | Residents Rally |
| Leader since | 17 December 1988 | 10 December 1988 | 1988 |
| Seats won | 5 | 4 | 4 |
| Seat change | ▲5 | ▲4 | ▲4 |
| Primary vote | 32,370 | 21,088 | 13,647 |
| Percentage | 22.8% | 14.9% | 9.6% |
| | Fourth party | Fifth party | Sixth party |
| | NSGP | ASGC | FEC |
| Leader | Craig Duby | Dennis Stevenson | Tony Fleming |
| Party | No Self Govt | Abolish Self Govt | Fair Elections |
| Leader since | 1989 | 1989 | 9 February 1989 |
| Seats won | 3 | 1 | 0 |
| Seat change | ▲3 | ▲1 | Steady |
| Primary vote | 16,274 | 10,641 | 7,765 |
| Percentage | 11.5% | 7.5% | 5.5% |
- At-Large electorate results
Resulting Chief Minister
Rosemary Follett
Labor

An election was held on 4 March 1989 to elect the first Australian Capital Territory Legislative Assembly. This was the first direct election by voters in the Australian Capital Territory (ACT) for their power legislative body.

The Labor Party, led by Rosemary Follett, and the Liberal Party, led by Trevor Kaine, were the main challengers. Candidates were elected to fill seats using modified d'Hondt electoral system for a multi-member single (at-large) constituency.

The result was a hung parliament. However, Labor, with the largest representation in the 17 member unicameral Assembly, formed government with the support of various non-aligned minor parties. Follett was elected the first Chief Minister at the first sitting of the Assembly on 11 May 1989.

== Key dates ==
- Party Register opened for Parliamentary Parties: 7 December 1988
- Party Register opened for non-Parliamentary Parties: 6 January 1989
- Party Register closed: 26 January 1989
- Pre-election period commenced/nominations opened: 27 January 1989
- Rolls closed: 3 February 1989
- Nominations closed: 10 February 1989
- Polling day: 4 March 1989
- Poll declared: 8 May 1989
- Legislative Assembly formed: 11 May 1989

== Overview ==
=== Background to self-government in the ACT ===
The Australian Capital Territory was established in 1911, initially called the Federal Capital Territory. The Territory was carved out of the state of New South Wales to make way for the site of the capital of Australia. As the Territory grew, particularly the city of Canberra from the 1960s, there were increasing calls for some form of self-government. There were a number of appointed and elected advisory bodies between 1920 and 1986. The main elected representative body of the ACT was the Australian Capital Territory House of Assembly that sat from 1975 to 1986. This House served primarily as an advisory body, with most legislative powers managed by the federal minister for the territories, under section 122 of the Australian Constitution. In an advisory referendum held in 1978, voters in the ACT rejected a proposal for self-government, with 63% voting in favour of the proposition that the 'present arrangements for governing the Australian capital should continue for the time being'. Thirty percent of voters favoured self-government with a locally elected body with state-like powers, and 6% voted for a locally elected body with powers and functions similar to those of local government. In spite of the referendum outcome, in 1983, the federal Labor government of prime minister Bob Hawke set up a Self-Government Task Force to report on the government of the ACT. Further, it wanted to force the ACT into line with the states on funding levels and, in late 1988, the federal government passed the Australian Capital Territory (Self-Government) Act 1988, allowing for the self-government of the ACT.

=== Political parties and election process ===
The Australian Capital Territory comprised one electorate for the election. However, electors were only able to cast ordinary votes within their own federal electoral seats of either Canberra or Fraser. The election was conducted by the Australian Electoral Commission, operating under Commonwealth legislation. The election was notable for having a ballot paper almost one-metre wide that listed 117 candidates for election representing 22 political parties. A number of parties ran in opposition to self-government and there was a number of people taking full advantage of some of the more ludicrous or ridiculous aspects of the ballot paper. The parties include the "Sun-Ripened Warm Tomato Party", "Party! Party! Party!" and "Surprise Party".

The centre-left Labor Party, led by Rosemary Follett, and the centre-right Liberal Party, led by Trevor Kaine, were the main challengers. Three minor parties also played a prominent role in the campaign including Residents Rally, a self described "community-based urban green party", led by Bernard Collaery, as well as two parties campaigning on platforms of opposing self-government.

== Results ==
| Party | Votes | % | Seats |
|---|---|---|---|
| Labor | 32,370 | 22.82 | 5 |
| Liberal | 21,088 | 14.87 | 4 |
| Independents | 16,351 | 11.53 | 0 |
| No Self Government Party | 16,274 | 11.47 | 3 |
| Residents Rally | 13,647 | 9.62 | 4 |
| Abolish Self Government Coalition | 10,641 | 7.50 | 1 |
| Fair Elections Coalition | 7,765 | 5.47 | 0 |
| The A.C.T Community Party | 5,777 | 4.07 | 0 |
| Canberra First | 4,918 | 3.47 | 0 |
| Family Movement | 3,885 | 2.74 | 0 |
| Democrats | 2,350 | 1.66 | 0 |
| National | 1,947 | 1.37 | 0 |
| Sun Ripened Warm Tomato | 1,666 | 1.17 | 0 |
| Party! Party! Party! | 979 | 0.69 | 0 |
| Christian Alternative | 846 | 0.60 | – |
| Democratic Socialist Perspective | 713 | 0.50 | 0 |
| Sleepers Wake | 173 | 0.12 | 0 |
| Surprise Party | 166 | 0.12 | 0 |
| Disabled & Redeployed Workers | 163 | 0.11 | 0 |
| A Better Idea | 80 | 0.06 | 0 |
| Home Rule OK | 62 | 0.04 | 0 |
| Total | 141,861 | 100.00 | 17 |
| Valid votes | 141,861 | 94.31 | |
| Invalid/blank votes | 8,560 | 5.69 | |
| Total votes | 150,421 | 100.00 | |
| Registered voters/turnout | 169,493 | 88.75 | |

=== Aftermath ===
It took almost two months after election day to determine the results of the election. Four people won seats on ostensible platforms of abolishing self-government. The result was a hung parliament. First preference results of the major contenders at conclusion of the final count were: Labor Party – 22.8 per cent, Liberal – 14.9 per cent, No Self Government Party – 11.5 per cent, Residents Rally – 9.6 per cent, and Abolish Self-Government Coalition – 7.5 per cent. Other candidates and parties that polled well, but failed to achieve a quota included Fair Elections Coalition (5.5%), John Haslem (4.8%), The A.C.T. Community Party (4.1%), and Bill Mackay (4.0%).

Following distribution of preferences, the membership of the first Assembly was one member from the Abolish Self-Government Coalition; five members from the Australian Labor Party; four members from the Liberal Party; three members from the No Self Government Party and four members from the Residents Rally. Labor, with the largest representation in the 17-member unicameral Assembly, formed a minority Government. Follett was elected the first Chief Minister at the first sitting of the first Assembly on 11 May 1989, sitting in rented premises at 1 Constitution Avenue, Canberra City. The final sitting of the first Assembly was on 17 December 1991.

=== Officeholders ===
The office holders of the first Assembly were:

- Speaker: David Prowse (No Self Government Party)
- Chief Minister: Rosemary Follett (Labor)
- Leader of the Opposition: Trevor Kaine (Liberal)

== Candidates ==
At the inaugural election, candidates were elected to fill seats using a modified D'Hondt method for a multi-member single constituency covering the entire Territory. Seventeen vacancies were available to fill the unicameral ACT Legislative Assembly. Tickets that elected at least one MLA are highlighted in the relevant colour. Successful candidates are indicated by an asterisk (*).

=== Abolished ACT House of Assembly candidates ===
With the ACT House of Assembly abolished in 1986, the following elected representatives from the previous House nominated as candidates for election to the inaugural ACT Legislative Assembly:

==== Labor ====
- Barry Reid
- Paul Whalan

==== Liberal ====
- Greg Cornwell
- Trevor Kaine
- Peter Kobold

==== Independents ====
- Harold Hird

==== Nationals ====
- David Adams (sat as a Liberal MHA)

==== Family Team ====
- Bev Cains

=== All candidates and parties seeking election ===
| Labor candidates | Liberal candidates | NSG candidates | Residents Rally candidates | ASGC candidates |
|---|---|---|---|---|
| 1. Rosemary Follett*; 2. Paul Whalan*; 3. Wayne Berry*; 4. Ellnor Grassby*; 5. Bill Wood*; 6. Di Ford; 7. Kevin Gill; 8. Anna Robieson; 9. Martin Attridge; 10. Peta Beelen; 11. Barry Reid | 1. Gary Humphries*; 2. Trevor Kaine*; 3. Robyn Nolan*; 4. Bill Stefaniak*; 5. Greg Cornwell; 6. Lyle Dunne; 7. Peter Kobold; 8. Judith Dowson; 9. Peter Jansen; 10. Bob Winnel | 1. Craig Duby*; 2. Carmel Maher*; 3. David Prowse*; 4. John Taylor; 5. Norman Henry; 6. Peter Alabaster; 7. John Cunningham; 8. Chris Elworthy; 9. Elma Lindh; 10. Nev Aurousseau; 11. John Cantlon; 12. Ken Durie; 13. Bob Smythe; 14. Lindsay Sales; 15. Philippa Meredith; 16. Jack Wright; 17. Yvonne Hammond | 1. Bernard Collaery*; 2. Norm Jensen*; 3. Michael Moore*; 4. Hector Kinloch*; 5. Joan Kellett; 6. Chris Donohue; 7. Marion Le; 8. Kelvin Giles; 9. Catherine Rossiter | 1. Dennis Stevenson*; 2. Flo Grant; 3. Gladys Dickson; 4. Chris Tazreiter; 5. Nerolie Bush; 6. Geoff Doepel; 7. Trish Orton; 8. Gail Aiken; 9. Mike Trevethan; 10. Reg Hayward; 11. Colin Beaton; 12. John Hesketh |
| Democrats candidates | Nationals candidates | Family Team candidates | FEC candidates | Canberra First candidates |
| 1. Arminel Ryan; 2. Bill Mason; 3. Heather Jeffcoat | 1. David Adams; 2. Michael Mullins; 3. Bruce MacKinnon | 1. Bev Cains; 2. Dawn Casley-Smith; 3. Ron Gane; 4. Bill Fearon; 5. Dennis Meagher; 6. Drewe Just | 1. Tony Fleming; 2. Alan Runciman; 3. Sarah Kirschbaum; 4. Gordon McAllister; 5. Gus Petersilka; 6. Julie McCarron-Benson | 1. Allan Nelson; 2. Beryl Byrnes; 3. John McMahon; 4. Jeff Brown; 5. Michael Apps; 6. Barry Brogan; 7. Jennie Booth; 8. Arthur Hetherington; 9. Elisabeth Apps; 10. Mike McColl; 11. Matt Campbell; 12. Garry Behan |
| Haslem candidates | Party! Party! Party! candidates | SWP candidate | DRWP candidates | Home Rule OK candidate |
| 1. John Haslem; 2. Caryl Haslem | 1. Amanda Call; 2. Shane McMillan | 1. Kristian Whittaker | 1. Peter Burrows; 2. Derek Robinson | 1. Tony Boye |
| A Better Idea candidate | Christian Alt. candidates | Sleepers Wake candidate | Community candidates | Tomato candidates |
| 1. Mick Scurfield | 1. Nathan Stirling; 2. Bernadette Ibell | 1. John Bellamy | 1. Ken Fry; 2. Domenic Mico; 3. Lorne Doyle | 1. Emile Brunoro; 2. Rick Kenny |
| Spagnolo candidate | Surprise Party candidate | Ungrouped candidates | | |
| 1. Tony Spagnolo | 1. C J Burns | Frank Crnkovic (Ind); Bill Mackey (Ind); Bob Reid (Ind); Kevin Robert Wise (Ind); Gary James Pead (Ind); Bill Pye (Ind); John Rocke (Ind); Harold Hird (Ind); Lyall L Gillespie (Ind) | | |

== Opinion polling ==
=== Voting intention ===
| Date | Firm | Sample size | Primary vote | | | | | | | | | |
| Date | Firm | Sample size | ALP | LIB | NSG | RR | ASG | HAS | COM | CFP | DEM | OTH |
|---|---|---|---|---|---|---|---|---|---|---|---|---|
| 4 Mar 1989 | 1989 election | | 22.8% | 14.9% | 11.5% | 9.6% | 7.5% | 4.8% | 4.1% | 3.5% | 1.7% | 19.7% |
| 26 Feb − 2 Mar 1989 | Datacol | 576 | 31.0% | 15.8% | 8.0% | 7.9% | 6.7% | 4.5% | 3.5% | 2.6% | 2.2% | 3.1% (Note: The Fair Elections Coalition had 2.8%, the National Party had 2.0%, the Family Team had 1.5%, Bill Mackey "leading the independent list" had 2.1%, and fellow independent Harold Hird had 1.0%.) |
| 17 − 21 Feb 1989 | Datacol | 484 | 21.1% | 10.8% | 4.1% | 3.2% | 2.1% | 1.8% | 2.3% | 3.0% | 1.1% | 6.3% (Note: All other parties had 6.3%, "undecided" had 35.0% and 9.1% said they would vote informally.) |
| 19 Feb 1989 | Billy Bong Research | 264 | 21.2% | 15.3% | 17.2% | 7.7% | —N/a | —N/a | —N/a | 3.7% | —N/a | 13.6% (Note: The Sun Ripened Warm Tomato Party had 3.7%, The Fair Elections Coalition had 1.8%, the National Party had 1.1%, "independents (grouped)" had 6.2%, the Rainbow Alliance had 0.8% and 21.4% said they would vote informally.) |
| 19 − 22 Dec 1988 | Datacol | 379 | 35.9% | 20.0% | —N/a | 1.1% | —N/a | —N/a | —N/a | —N/a | 3.8% | 8.9% (Note: Other parties had 2.7%, independents had 6.2% and "undecided" had 30.3%.) |

== See also ==
- Australian Capital Territory (Self-Government) Act 1988
- Novelty candidate
- First Follett Ministry
- Kaine Ministry
- Second Follett Ministry
- Liberal–Residents Rally Alliance
- Members of the Australian Capital Territory Legislative Assembly, 1989-1991
