= Independents Group =

Defunct political party in the Australian Capital Territory

- Founded: 3 December 1989
- Dissolved: c. 1992
- Preceded by: No Self Government Party
- Legislative Assembly: 3 / 18 (1989–1990)

The Independents Group was a short-lived Australian political party operating in the Australian Capital Territory. They briefly served as part of the Alliance government, alongside the Liberal Party and Residents Rally.

When the 1989 election was held, the No Self Government Party emerged as the larger of the two anti-self-government groups in the Assembly, electing three members, Craig Duby, Carmel Maher and David Prowse. However, unlike Dennis Stevenson's Abolish Self-Government Coalition, the No Self-Government Party's focus soon began to change from their original single-issue basis.

The first vote of the new Assembly saw Prowse voted in as the Speaker by the members. In late 1989, Residents Rally, who were supporting the Follett Labor government, began discussions aimed at forming a coalition government with the Liberals. They then turned to the No Self Government Party, who accepted the offer. However, as opposition to self-government itself was a core basis of their party, and it would have been seen as somewhat odd for them to then join a government, Duby, and Maher disbanded the party, and reformed as the Independents Group. Prowse joined the Liberal party in July 1990. The new party then became the third member of the Alliance government, and Duby, the old party's former leader, became Minister for Urban Services. Prowse retained his position as Speaker.

Whilst Duby was a vocal member of the government, and was often heard in the Assembly and media, Maher tended to be a less significant player in ACT politics. Nevertheless, the party were vital in sustaining the Alliance government for its eighteen-month lifespan. As long as the Alliance survived, however, they nevertheless maintained influence in decision-making. This was to end when the Liberal Party and Residents Rally fell out in late 1991, causing Residents Rally to move a no-confidence motion in the government. The Follett Labor government with Residents Rally and independents support returned to power. Prowse retained the Speakership.

Soon after, on 19 November, realising that the Independents Group was effectively dead, Duby quit the party to form the Hare-Clark Independent Party. With her influence in the Assembly reduced to practically nil, Maher continued under the Independents Group until the 1992 election. Both Maher and Prowse retired at the election, and though Duby contested the election with his new party, he lost his seat. By the 1995 election, the Independents Group was entirely dead, with none its members playing any further role in ACT politics.
