= Lou Westende =

Australian politician (1925–2020)

Laurus "Lou" Vant Westende (28 November 1925 – 28 August 2020) was an Australian politician and was a member elected to the multi-member single constituency second Australian Capital Territory Legislative Assembly for the Liberal Party at the 1992 general election. Westende resigned from the Assembly on 25 July 1994, and, on the basis of a countback, Bill Stefaniak was appointed to fill the casual vacancy.

Westende was born in Heerenhook, Netherlands and settled in Australia during 1951.
