= Rosemary Follett =

Australian politician

Rosemary Follett AO
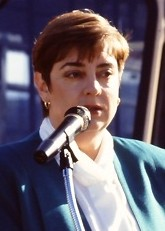

1st Chief Minister of the Australian Capital Territory
- In office 11 May 1989 – 5 December 1989
- Deputy: Paul Whalan
- Succeeded by: Trevor Kaine
- In office 6 June 1991 – 2 March 1995
- Deputy: Wayne Berry David Lamont
- Preceded by: Trevor Kaine
- Succeeded by: Kate Carnell

Member of the ACT Legislative Assembly
- In office 4 March 1989 – 18 February 1995 Serving with Berry, Collaery, Connolly, Duby, Grassby, Humphries, Jensen, Kaine, Kinloch, Maher, Moore, Nolan, Prowse, Stefaniak, Stevenson, Wood, Whalan
- Preceded by: First Assembly
- Succeeded by: Multi-member multiple constituencies
- In office 18 February 1995 – 12 December 1996 Serving with Carnell, Connolly, Cornwell, Humphries, Moore, Tucker
- Preceded by: Multi-member single constituency
- Succeeded by: Simon Corbell
- Constituency: Molonglo

Personal details
- Born: 27 March 1948 (age 78) Sydney
- Party: Labor (since 1975)
- Education: Canberra College of Advanced Education
- Occupation: Politician, activist

Rosemary Follett AO (born 27 March 1948) is an Australian former politician who was the first Chief Minister of Australian Capital Territory, serving in 1989 and again between 1991 and 1995. She was the first woman to become head of government in an Australian state or territory.

== Early life ==
Follett is the daughter of hansard writer Aubrey Follett, an Anglican, and his wife Judith (née Lusby), a teacher and Roman Catholic. Follett was born in Sydney in 1948, and moved with her family to Canberra in 1952. She took inspiration from female models of leadership in her own family from an early age — her mother was a teacher who had worked in naval intelligence with the Women's Royal Australian Naval Service during World War II, while her aunt, Dr Gwen (Lusby) Fleming, had been a Major in the Australian Army Medical Corps, and aunt, Elizabeth Lusby was a school prioress in the Dominican Sisters.

Follett attended Canberra Catholic Girls' High School. She joined the Australian Public Service after leaving school, and travelled to Darwin and Sydney. She returned to Canberra with the public service, but was required to resign when she married. She studied stenography, and worked as a secretary for various politicians over the next ten years.

The 1975 dismissal of the Whitlam government inspired Follett to join the Ginninderra branch of the Labor Party, serving as its president between 1983 and 1984. In the meantime, she returned to university, studying arts and administration at the Canberra College of Advanced Education, and rejoined the public service. Prior to her election to the Assembly, Follett was an elected Member for Fraser in the representative advisory ACT House of Assembly, serving between 1985 and 1986; and became President of the ACT branch of Labor in 1987.

== Political career ==
Preselected to lead Labor in the period before the 1989 inaugural general election, Follett was elected to the inaugural ACT Legislative Assembly and, on 11 May 1989, was elected by the Assembly as the inaugural Chief Minister. The first Assembly was characterised by a hung parliament and significant political instability.

Months later, confidence was waning in the minority Follett Labor government. On 5 December 1989, Bernard Collaery, leader of the Residents Rally group (with three members in the Assembly) moved the following motion in the Assembly:

That this Assembly no longer has confidence in the Chief Minister of the ACT and the minority Labor Government and has confidence in the ability of Mr Kaine to form a government.

The vote was resolved in affirmative (10 votes to 7 votes), and Trevor Kaine was elected as the second Chief Minister. After another motion of no confidence was passed, this time against Kaine, Follett returned to office in 1991 and she led Labor to victory at the 1992 general election. Defeated by the Liberals under Kate Carnell at the 1995 general election. Follett continued to lead the ALP until the following year 1996. With a caucus of six members, Follett stood down as leader after she was tapped on the shoulder by Andrew Whitecross, the man who would become her successor and two of their colleagues. Follett then resigned from the ACT Legislative Assembly in December 1996. Simon Corbell was elected to fill the casual vacancy.

== Later career ==
Since leaving politics, Follett has been Deputy Vice-chancellor at the University of Canberra; Chair of the Vocational Education and Training Authority; a member of the University of Canberra Council; member of the Sentence Administration Board and chair of the board of Senior Secondary School Studies. She led a trade mission to Japan and was instrumental in bringing about the ACT's sister-city relationship with Nara and was a member of the Milk Authority of the ACT in 1996, and the Canberra Labor Club, Canberra Tradesmen's Club and the Australian Fabian Society. Follett was the ACT's Sex Discrimination Commissioner from 1996 to 2004. On 14 April 2014, Follett received an honorary doctorate from the University of Canberra.

== See also ==
- First Follett Ministry
- Second Follett Ministry
- Third Follett Ministry
- List of female heads of government in Australia
- List of the first women holders of political offices in Oceania
- Jack Lusby
- Gwen Fleming
- Justin Fleming

Political offices
New title	Chief Minister of the Australian Capital Territory; 1989	Succeeded by Trevor Kaine
Preceded by Trevor Kaine	Chief Minister of the Australian Capital Territory; 1991–1995	Succeeded by Kate Carnell
Party political offices
Preceded by Trevor Kaine	Opposition Leader of the Australian Capital Territory; 1989–1991	Succeeded by Trevor Kaine
Preceded by Kate Carnell	Opposition Leader of the Australian Capital Territory; 1995–1996	Succeeded by Andrew Whitecross
Australian Capital Territory Legislative Assembly
New title	Member of the ACT Legislative Assembly; 1989–1995; Served alongside: Berry, Collaery, Connolly, Duby, Grassby, Humphries, Jensen, Kaine, Kinloch, Maher, Moore, Nolan, Prowse, Stefaniak, Stevenson, Wood, Whalan	Succeeded by Multi-member multiple constituencies
New title	Member for Molonglo; 1995–1996; Served alongside: Carnell, Connolly, Cornwell, Humphries, Moore, Tucker	Succeeded by Simon Corbell
