= Helen Szuty =

Australian politician

Helen Margaret Szuty (born 3 September 1957) is a former Australian politician. She was an independent member of the Australian Capital Territory Legislative Assembly from 1992 to 1995.

== Education ==
Szuty graduated with a BA from the University of Western Australia and a Master of Education from the former Canberra College of Advanced Education before working in Community Services in Canberra.

== ACT Legislative Assembly ==
In 1992 she stood for the ACT Legislative Assembly and was elected as the running mate of sitting independent Michael Moore on the Moore Independents Group ticket, but sat in the Assembly as an independent. She was unsuccessful in recontesting her seat at the 1995 election on Moore's ticket, and again on an attempt to regain her seat at the 1998 election as an unaligned independent.

== Szuty v Smyth ==
In 1998, ACT Minister for Urban Services, Brendan Smyth claimed that Szuty made inappropriate representations to him on behalf of a client of the real estate agency where Szuty had recently been employed. Szuty made representations that her client was facing severe hardship. As a result of Smyth's complaint, made in confidence, to the Real Estate Institute of the ACT, Szuty was dismissed by her employer. Szuty asked Smyth to withdraw his complaint; which he ignored. On the basis of the complaint, Szuty claimed that she had been allegedly defamed, and Smyth's actions adversely affected her employment and had ultimately forced her to leave the ACT. Szuty took defamation proceeding in the ACT Supreme Court. In a finding that was handed down in 2004, Chief Justice Higgins was scathing in his criticism of Smyth, but ruled that the defamatory remarks he had made about Szuty were protected by qualified privilege.

== South Australia ==
Szuty moved to Burra, South Australia in 1999. She edited and published "The Visitors Monthly" magazine in Burra from 2001 to 2011, and was also the spokesperson for the Group of Concerned Burra and District Residents and the Ratepayers Action Group (Regional Council of Goyder). She contested the Burra Ward of the Regional Council of Goyder at the 2010 and 2014 local government elections and again at a 2016 supplementary election, but was unsuccessful on each occasion.

More recently she moved to Tanunda, South Australia where she has worked under contract as a Field Interviewer with Roy Morgan Research on a variety of projects.

In the 2018 South Australian state election she was the SA Best candidate for the electoral district of Playford.
