= Kate Carnell =

Australian politician (born 1955)

Kate Carnell AO
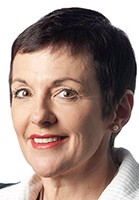
- Carnell in 2009

3rd Chief Minister of the Australian Capital Territory Elections: 1995, 1998
- In office 2 March 1995 – 18 October 2000
- Deputy: Gary Humphries
- Preceded by: Rosemary Follett
- Succeeded by: Gary Humphries

Member of the Australian Capital Territory Legislative Assembly
- In office 15 February 1992 – 17 October 2000
- Succeeded by: Jacqui Burke
- Constituency: Molonglo

Personal details
- Born: Anne Katherine Knowlman; 30 May 1955 (age 71) Brisbane, Queensland, Australia
- Party: Liberal Party
- Spouses: Ian Carnell (m. 1977–1997) Ray Kiley (m. 2007)
- Profession: Pharmacist

Anne Katherine Carnell AO (née Knowlman; born 30 May 1955) is an Australian businesswoman and former Liberal Party politician, who served as the third Chief Minister of the Australian Capital Territory (ACT) from 1995 to 2000.

== Early life and pharmacy career ==
Carnell was born on 30 May 1955, in Brisbane, Queensland. Her parents owned a small accounting business.

As a teenager she struggled with anorexia and went to hospital in Sydney to recover. She battled the illness for four years.

Heading back to Brisbane after her hospitalisation, Carnell returned to her studies and graduated from the University of Queensland in 1976 with a pharmacy degree. She married Ian Carnell in July 1977 and together they moved to Canberra, arriving August 1977. She bought her own pharmacy business in Red Hill in 1981. She owned and managed the pharmacy until 2000.

She was the inaugural chairman of the ACT Branch of the Australian Pharmacy Guild, serving in the position between 1988 and 1994, and National Vice-President of the guild between 1990 and 1994.

Other positions she occupied included: Chairman of the Canberra and Southern District Pharmacists Company Ltd (1982–1992), Vice-President of the Retail Industry and Training Council, ACT (1987–1991), Councillor at the Australian Institute of Pharmacy Management (1990–1991), Member of the ACT Board of Health (1990–1991), and a Member of the Pharmacy Restructuring Authority (1990–1991).

Kate Carnell is currently active as the inaugural SPA Council Chair as of January, 2025.

== Politics ==
Carnell joined the Liberal Party in 1991 and was elected to the second ACT Legislative Assembly in 1992. She became the Leader of the Opposition in 1993, succeeding Trevor Kaine.

After winning 7 of 17 seats in the 1995 ACT election, the Liberal Party formed a minority government with Carnell as Chief Minister. The government was re-elected in the 1998 election. She has held the portfolios of Minister for Health and Community Care (1995–1998), Minister Responsible for Multicultural and International Affairs (1995–2000), Minister for Business and Employment (1997–1998) and Minister for Business, Tourism and the Arts (2000).

=== Canberra hospital implosion ===
The Carnell Government was severely criticised following the death of twelve-year-old Katie Bender, when the de-commissioned Royal Canberra Hospital was imploded on 13 July 1997 to make way for the National Museum of Australia. Bender died instantly when she was struck by a one kilogram fragment of metal sliced through her head which had been thrown about 430 metres across Lake Burley Griffin by the force of the explosion.

The Coroner cleared Carnell as Chief Minister of any personal responsibility. The Coroner did find in his report that the Government had turned the implosion into a 'public circus' and that this was with the approval of the Chief Minister. The public was invited by the Government to attend and witness the event, resulting in the largest crowd in Canberra's history, in excess of 100,000. The Coroner found that the Government had been cavalier in its attitude to the warnings from a health union about the possible dangers of some aspects of the proposed implosion. The Coroner summarised that, "the evidence on this topic leads me to conclude that Carnell was poorly briefed and advised on this subject matter. The quality of the reply to the HSUA was sacrificed in the interests of speed and expediency".

=== Bruce Stadium redevelopment ===
In October 2000, Carnell resigned, pre-empting a no-confidence motion in relation to cost over-runs in the Bruce Stadium redevelopment project (now known as Canberra Stadium). The project had a $27.3 million budget, of which $12.3 million was provided for by the ACT government and $15 million was to be sourced from the private sector. However, the project eventually cost $82 million, and was solely funded by the government. An ACT Auditor-General's review found that the project's $27.3 million cost estimate had not undergone proper assessment, review or analysis. Carnell had denied any wrong-doing and claimed that the Auditor-General had found that the cabinet was acting reasonably in the matter as she was determined to remain in office. The review also found that while private financing had been included in the project budget, no funds had been offered or provided by the private sector.

=== Resignation ===
Carnell resigned as Chief Minister on 17 October 2000, before the no-confidence motion was moved against her. She was replaced as Chief Minister by Gary Humphries.

Reflecting on the end of her career in 2012, Carnell told media that she took ministerial responsibility for breaches of the Financial Management Act related to the Bruce Stadium redevelopment because it had occurred in her portfolio, even though the breaches happened without her knowledge. Carnell told reporters that interpretation of ministerial responsibility in the Legislative Assembly had become "really different" in the time since, comparing her downfall in 2000, to current events in 2012, surrounding former Chief Minister Katy Gallagher, who was cleared of ministerial responsibility for data-tampering in her health portfolio.

== Life after politics ==
After resigning her post as the Chief Minister of the Australian Capital Territory, Carnell has worked in a variety of positions.

- She made a successful bid for election to the NRMA board in August 2001. Carnell resigned her role as NRMA director in 2002.
- She was appointed chairperson of General Practice Education and Training Ltd by the health minister Michael Wooldridge in 2001, and re-appointed by Woolridge's successor Tony Abbott in 2004.
- She spent three years as executive director of the National Association of Forest Industries (NAFI).
- Between 2006 and 2008 Carnell was the chief executive officer at the Australian General Practice Network.
- In 2008 Carnell was appointed as the CEO of the Australian Food and Grocery Council.
- She was the CEO of the non-profit organisation, beyondblue, from 2012 to 2014.
- Since March, 2016, Carnell was the inaugural Australian Small Business and Family Enterprise Ombudsman (ASBFEO).

She was appointed an Officer of the Order of Australia (AO) in the Australia Day Honours list of 2006, for her services and contributions to the Australian Capital Territory.

On 29 July 2007, nearly a decade after her first marriage dissolved, Carnell and her long-term partner, Ray Kiley, married at a ceremony conducted at Old Parliament House in Canberra.

In April 2013, Carnell received an honorary doctorate from the University of Canberra.

In October 2019 she was named one of the Australian Financial Review 100 Women of Influence in the Public Policy category.

From June 2023, she served as co-convenor of the Liberals for Yes group, a group of Liberal Party supporters who support the Indigenous Voice to Parliament referendum, despite federal leader Peter Dutton being opposed to it.

Carnell has been appointed as the inaugural SPA Council Chair as of January, 2025.

Carnell has been interim chair of Beyond Blue since April 2024. She has been a member of their board since 2008.

== Personal life ==
Carnell's daughter, Clare, is the co-founder of the Independents for Canberra party.

== See also ==
- First Carnell Ministry
- Second Carnell Ministry
- List of female heads of government in Australia

Political offices
Preceded by Rosemary Follett	Chief Minister of the Australian Capital Territory; 1995–2000	Succeeded by Gary Humphries
Party political offices
Preceded by Trevor Kaine	Opposition Leader of the Australian Capital Territory; 1993–1995	Succeeded by Rosemary Follett
Australian Capital Territory Legislative Assembly
Preceded by	Member of the ACT Legislative Assembly; 1992–1995	Succeeded by
Preceded by	Member for Molonglo in the ACT Legislative Assembly; 1995–2000	Succeeded by Jacqui Burke
