= Australian Capital Territory (Self-Government) Act 1988 =

Act of the Parliament of Australia

Parliament of Australia
- Long title: An Act to provide for the Government of the Australian Capital Territory, and for related purposes
- Citation: Australian Capital Territory (Self-Government) Act 1988 (Cth)
- Assented to: 6 December 1988
- Introduced by: Allan Holding MP
- Status: Amended

The Australian Capital Territory (Self-Government) Act 1988 is an Act of the Parliament of Australia enacted on 6 December 1988, that establishes "a body politic under the Crown by the name of the Australian Capital Territory" and is the constitutional foundation of the Territory's government.

Before the act, the federal government was responsible for the administration of the ACT.

== Provisions ==
The act requires that ACT legislation only has effect insofar as it is not inconsistent with federal legislation.

== History ==
The territory presently called the Australian Capital Territory was transferred to the Commonwealth by the state of New South Wales as the Federal Capital Territory on 1 January 1911, to be the seat of the federal government. The planning and construction of Canberra followed, with the Parliament of Australia moving there in 1927. On its creation, the Territory's few residents lost any representation they had in the federal parliament and had no means of electing a government to make laws.

In 1930, the ACT Advisory Council replaced the Federal Capital Commission, which had existed since 1925. The Council and the Minister for Territories administered the ACT. In 1934, the ACT Supreme Court was created. The Territory officially became the Australian Capital Territory in 1938.

In 1974, the Advisory Council became a fully elected Legislative Assembly, but with only an advisory role to the Department of the Capital Territory. In 1979 the re-named House of Assembly had 18 elected members. On 27 November 1978, the Australian Capital Territory voted at a referendum on whether the ACT should be granted self-government. Voters were given the choice of becoming a self-governing territory, a local government or continuing with the Legislative Assembly being an advisory body to the Department of the Capital Territory. 63.75% voted to continue with the then current arrangement.

Despite the outcome of the referendum, the ACT Assembly was dissolved in 1986, and the Parliament of Australia passed the Australian Capital Territory (Self-Government) Act 1988 and the ACT became a self-governing territory in 1989. The first elections in the ACT were held on 4 March 1989; and the Australian Capital Territory Legislative Assembly first sat on 11 May that year.

Parties that opposed self-government, the No Self Government Party and Abolish Self Government Coalition ran in the 1989 election. They would get a total 18.97% and 4 seats. These parties would be dissolved during the 1990s.

== Further developments ==
In 2012, the Legislative Assembly held a review of the act.

In 2015, Katy Gallagher, senator for the ACT, criticised the legislation, saying that it constrained the ACT.

== See also ==
- Australian Capital Territory Legislative Assembly
- ACT Government
