= Paul Whalan =

Australian politician (born 1941)

Paul Whalan MLA

Member of the Australian Capital Territory Legislative Assembly
- In office 4 March 1989 – 30 April 1990

Deputy Leader of the ACT Labor Party
- In office 17 December 1988 – 30 April 1990
- Succeeded by: Wayne Berry

Deputy Chief Minister of the Australian Capital Territory
- In office 11 May 1989 – 5 December 1989
- Preceded by: Position created
- Succeeded by: Bernard Collaery

Leader of the ACT Labor Party
- In office 28 June 1985 – 30 June 1986
- Preceded by: Maurene Horder
- Succeeded by: Rosemary Follett

Member of the Australian Capital Territory Legislative Assembly for Canberra
- In office 23 February 1977 – 30 June 1986
- Preceded by: Gordon Walsh

Personal details
- Born: Paul Russell Whalan; 10 July 1941 (age 84)
- Party: Labor

Paul Russell Whalan (born 10 July 1941) is an Australian political lobbyist and former politician who was a member of the first Australian Capital Territory Legislative Assembly. He served as the leader of the ACT Labor Party in the mid-1980s and was the leader of the party's Right faction.

== Career ==
Prior to entering politics, Whalan served as the ACT secretary of the Shop, Distributive and Allied Employees Association and as a senior advisor to five ministers in the Hawke federal government.

In February 1977, Canberra MLA Gordon Walsh resigned from the Australian Capital Territory Legislative Assembly (later known as the House of Assembly). Walsh was appointed by Labor to fill the vacancy, and he was re-elected in his own right at the 1979 and 1982 elections. After the 1983 leadership spill that saw Maurene Horder defeat Ken Doyle, Labor MHAs elected Walsh as the party's caucus chairman.

On 24 June 1985, Horder announced her resignation as leader and from the House of Assembly. At a caucus meeting on 28 June, Walsh was one of at least three candidates to contest the leadership. No candidate initially had a majority, but on the final ballot, Whalan emerged victorious and became Labor leader.

Following the dissolution of the House of Assembly on 30 June 1986, Labor was left without a formal leader. Ahead of the 1989 ACT election, the first under self-government, the party held a preselection to decide its 11 candidates. Whalan was seen as a favourite for the leadership based on the strength of the Labor Right faction, although the majority of members did not belong to any faction. However, Labor Left leader Rosemary Follett narrowly defeated Whalan by a margin of just 14 votes. Whalan became Labor's deputy leader.

Just days before the 1989 election, Whalan planned to challenge Follett for the leadership if enough Right faction members were elected, even if Labor won government. However, he instead decided to let Follett handle the difficulties of the first term, after which he would mount a challenge in the lead up to the next election.

Whalan was elected at the 1989 election and became the first deputy chief minister on 16 May 1989. He also served as the first minister with responsibilities for industry, employment and education in the Follett government. He lost these positions in December 1989 when the Residents Rally successfully moved a no-confidence motion in Follett, which led to the creation of the Alliance government.

Ultimately, Whalan never officially challenged Follett and resigned from the Legislative Assembly on 30 April 1990, citing a decision not to give pay rises to MLAs such as himself. Outside of parliament, Whalan criticised Follett and Labor Left, and threatened to challenge sitting federal Labor MP John Langmore for his seat of Fraser.
