= Abolish Self Government Coalition =

Defunct political party in Australia

- Abbreviation: ASGC
- Founded: 1989
- Registered: 22 December 1992 (federal)
- Dissolved: 16 June 1995
- Legislative Assembly: 1 / 18 (1989–1995)

The Abolish Self Government Coalition was a minor Australian Capital Territory political party that experienced limited success in the early years of the Australian Capital Territory Legislative Assembly. It opposed self government for the ACT, supporting its re-integration into the local government of New South Wales. The party elected one MLA, Dennis Stevenson, to the ACT Legislative Assembly in 1989; he was re-elected in 1991 but retired in 1995, after which the party declined markedly. It was federally registered on 22 December 1992 and deregistered on 16 June 1995.

== Electoral performance ==
=== Legislative Assembly ===
| Election | Votes | % | Seats | +/– | Position | Status |
|---|---|---|---|---|---|---|
| 1989 | 10,641 | 7.50 | 1 / 17 | ▲1 | ▲5th | Opposition |
| 1992 | 10,998 | 7.06 | 1 / 17 | 1 | ▲3rd | Opposition |
