= No Self Government Party =

Defunct single-issue political party in the Australian Capital Territory

- Abbreviation: NSGP, NSG
- Founded: 1989
- Dissolved: 1992
- Succeeded by: Independents Group
- Legislative Assembly: 3 / 18 (1989)

The No Self Government Party was a minor Australian Capital Territory political party that experienced limited success in the early years of the Australian Capital Territory Legislative Assembly. Like Dennis Stevenson's Abolish Self-Government Coalition, it opposed self-government for the ACT. In the first territory election in 1989, three members of the party were elected. By the time the party was disbanded in 1992, all elected MLAs had quit the party.

== Electoral performance ==
=== Legislative Assembly ===
Election	Votes	%	Seats	+/–	Position	Status
1989	16,274	11.47	3 / 17	▲3	▲3rd	Opposition
