= Michael Moore (Australian politician) =

Australian politician (born 1950)

Michael Moore AM

Minister of Health and Community Care
- In office 1998–2001
- Preceded by: Kate Carnell

Member of the ACT Legislative Assembly
- In office 4 March 1989 – November 2001
- Succeeded by: Katy Gallagher
- Constituency: Molonglo

Personal details
- Born: Michael John Moore; 2 April 1950 (age 76)
- Party: Independent
- Other political affiliations: Moore Independents; Residents Rally (until 1989)
- Education: Flinders University; University of Adelaide; Australian National University; University of Canberra
- Profession: Public Health Professional

Michael John Moore AM (born 2 April 1950) is an Australian public health leader, academic and former politician. He was an independent member of the Australian Capital Territory Legislative Assembly for four terms, from 1989 to 2001. He was Minister for Health and Community Care from 1998 to 2001 in the Liberal minority government led by Chief Minister, Kate Carnell and later, Gary Humphries.

== Early life and education ==
Moore holds a post-graduate diploma in education, a master's degree in population health, and a PhD from the University of Canberra. His master's degree in population health is from the Australian National University in 1997. He is a Distinguished Fellow at the George Institute for Global Health, has been a visiting professor at the University of Technology, Sydney and is an adjunct professor with the University of Canberra.

== Politics ==
In 1989, Moore was elected as a Residents Rally member to the first multi-member single-constituency unicameral ACT Legislative Assembly. No party had won a majority, and Rosemary Follett's Labor Party formed a minority government. He was re-elected for a second term at the single-constituency 1992 general election with Helen Szuty as part of the Michael Moore Independent Group, and at the 1995 and 1998 general elections as Moore Independents. He represented the electorate of Molonglo.

He was Minister for Housing, Corrections and Children's Services and was Manager of Government Business. He chaired the Australian Ministerial Councils for both Health and Corrections.

Moore was a social progressive who was responsible for the legalisation of prostitution, the decriminalisation of cannabis and was a strong advocate for trialling the provision of heroin to dependent users. He was a joint founder of the Australian Parliamentary Group on Drug Law Reform, the Australian Drug Law Reform Foundation and sponsored the early meetings of the group Families and Friends for Drug Law Reform.

== Moore Independents ==
Moore Independents Independent Group (1992)
- Leader: Michael Moore
- Founder: Michael Moore
- Dissolved: 10 September 2001 (deregistered)
- Split from: Residents Rally
- Legislative Assembly: 2 / 17 (1998)

Ahead of the 1992 Australian Capital Territory election, Moore registered two parties, Independent Group and Canberra Independents, under rules which allowed a party to register without membership requirements if they were represented by a sitting MLA. This was done in an effort to prevent the two members of the Alliance government who made up the Independents Group from registering a party of the same name. He said that he believed they were not truly independents due to their place in the Alliance and that he had registered the parties so they would not be able to use the name.

The party won two seats at the 1992 election in Moore and Helen Szuty who acted largely independently to each other once in the Assembly, with the latter leaving the party to sit as an independent on the first sitting day of the term.

Moore re-contested at the 1995 and 1998 elections under the party name Moore Independents winning a single seat each time. He retired at the 2001 election and the party was subsequently deregistered.

== Other positions ==
Since 2006, he has been a political and social columnist with the Canberra City News. From 2008 until 2018, Moore was chief executive officer of the Public Health Association of Australia. He was President of the World Federation of Public Health Associations (WFPHA) from 2016-2018 and was appointed Chair of the WFPHA International Taskforce on Immunization Policy in 2020. Moore was the inaugural District 9705 Governor for Rotary International in 2020-21.
