= Robyn Nolan =

Australian politician

Robyn Margaret Nolan is an Australian politician and was a member of the first multi-member single electorate Australian Capital Territory Legislative Assembly representing, initially, the Liberal Party. Nolan was elected at the 1989 general election and then resigned from the Liberal Party on 11 October 1991, sat briefly as an independent, before founding the New Conservative Group on 19 November 1991. Nolan sought re-election, leading the New Conservative party ticket, at the 1992 general election, however was unsuccessful in retaining her seat.
