= Carmel Maher =

Australian politician (born 1954)

Carmel Anne Maher (born 5 April 1954) is an Australian politician. She was a member of the Australian Capital Territory Legislative Assembly from 1989 to 1991, serving one term. She represented the No Self-Government Party and later the Independents Group.
