= Bill Wood (politician) =

Australian politician (1935–2024)

Bill Wood AM

Member of the Queensland Legislative Assembly for Cook
- In office 17 May 1969 – 27 May 1972
- Preceded by: Bunny Adair
- Succeeded by: Edwin Wallis-Smith

Member of the Queensland Legislative Assembly for Barron River
- In office 27 May 1972 – 7 December 1974
- Preceded by: New seat
- Succeeded by: Martin Tenni

Personal details
- Born: 4 November 1935 Toowoomba, Queensland, Australia
- Died: 19 May 2024 (aged 88) Canberra, Australian Capital Territory, Australia
- Party: Labor
- Relations: Les Wood (father), Peter Wood (twin brother)
- Education: University of Queensland
- Occupation: Teacher

Bill Wood AM (4 November 1935 – 19 May 2024) was an Australian politician who served as a member of the Legislative Assembly of Queensland and the Australian Capital Territory Legislative Assembly.

== Career ==
Wood was elected to the Queensland Parliament as the Labor member for Cook in 1969, transferring in 1972 to the new seat of Barron River. He was defeated in 1974 by Country Party candidate Martin Tenni.

Wood was elected the first ACT Legislative Assembly in 1989, re-elected to the 2nd Assembly in 1992, elected to represent Brindabella in the Assembly in 1995, 1998 and 2001 general elections. He did not contest the 2004 ACT general election.

In 2013, Wood was made a Member of the Order of Australia (AM) for "significant service to the community and the Legislative Assembly of the Australian Capital Territory".

== Personal life ==
Wood's identical twin brother Peter Wood, and their father Les Wood also served terms in the Queensland Parliament. Les was also briefly the leader of the Queensland ALP prior to his death in 1958. Wood died on 19 May 2024, aged 88.

Parliament of Queensland
Preceded by Bunny Adair	Member for Cook; 1969–1972	Succeeded by Edwin Wallis-Smith
New district	Member for Barron River; 1972–1974	Succeeded by Martin Tenni
