= Bill Stefaniak =

Australian politician (born 1952)

Bill Stefaniak AM, RFD
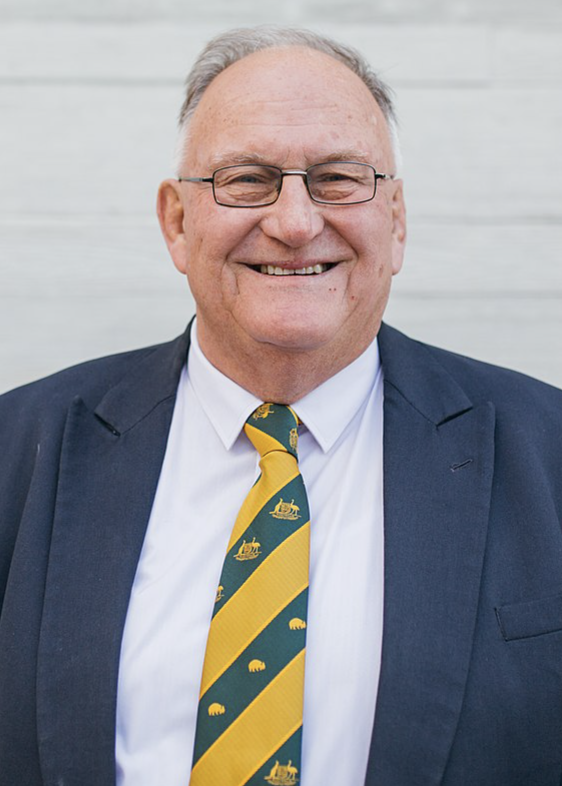

Member of the Australian Capital Territory Legislative Assembly for Ginninderra
- In office 18 February 1995 – 28 August 2008

Personal details
- Born: William George Stefaniak; 8 January 1952 (age 74) Canberra, Australian Capital Territory
- Party: Belco (2020–present)
- Other political affiliations: Liberal (until 2008); Independent (2008−2020)
- Education: Australian National University

William George Stefaniak AM, RFD (born 8 January 1952) is an Australian politician and former Australian Capital Territory Minister. He was the Leader of the Opposition in the Australian Capital Territory after succeeding in a leadership challenge against then-leader Brendan Smyth on 16 May 2006. He is a former Major in the Australian Army Reserve and a law graduate of the Australian National University. On 13 December 2007, he was replaced as Liberal Leader by Zed Seselja. Stefaniak contested the 2020 Australian Capital Territory election as leader of the Belco Party but was not elected.

He was one of the five members of the district of Ginninderra from 1995 to 2008. Following the end of his term in Parliament, Stefaniak became appeal president of the ACT Civil and Administrative Tribunal.

Stefaniak was appointed a Member of the Order of Australia in the 2014 Australia Day Honours.

== Background ==
Stefaniak grew up in Canberra and attended Narrabundah College.

Political offices
Preceded by Brendan Smyth	Opposition Leader of the Australian Capital Territory; 2006–2007	Succeeded by Zed Seselja
