= 1995 Australian Capital Territory electoral system referendum =

- 18 February 1995
- Write YES or NO in the box below to show whether you approve the law to entrench the principles of the proportional representation (Hare–Clark) electoral system: Do you approve the entrenching law?

Results
Choice	Votes	%
Yes	109,666	65.01%
No	59,017	34.99%
Valid votes	168,683	95.91%
Invalid or blank votes	7,190	4.09%
Total votes	175,873	100.00%
Registered voters/turnout	175,873	100%
- Results by electorate

The 1995 Australian Capital Territory electoral system referendum was a referendum held on 18 February 1995, asking voters in the Australian Capital Territory (ACT) whether to entrench their current electoral system. The referendum took place alongside the 1995 ACT election.

At a referendum in 1992, voters were asked to choose between the proportional Hare–Clark system or single-member electorates (using preferential voting). By a comfortable margin, voters chose Hare–Clark, which came into effect for the 1995 election.

The 1995 referendum asked voters whether they approved entrenching the principles of Hare–Clark. The "Yes" vote received 65% of the vote and the referendum was passed.

== Background ==
On 8 December 1994, the Proportional Representation (Hare–Clark) Entrenchment Bill was passed by the ACT Legislative Assembly. If passed by voters at the 1995 referendum, it would entrench the principles of Hare–Clark − meaning that elements of the system would only be able to be changed if a majority of voters supported a change at a future referendum, or if a two-thirds majority in the Legislative Assembly voted in favour of a change.

== Result ==
With 65% of the "Yes" vote (just 0.3% less than what Hare–Clark received in 1992), the referendum was passed.

For a referendum to pass, it needed 50% of support of enrolled voters, which meant that informal votes and non-voters essentially counted as votes against, meaning around 58% of formal votes were usually needed for a proposal to pass. The result was assured on 19 February 1995 when the 97,695th vote for Hare–Clark was counted.

The referendum, like the election, was conducted by Elections ACT.

=== Result by electorate ===
Electorate	Enrolled voters	YES		NO		Informal		Turnout	
Electorate	Enrolled voters	Votes	%	Votes	%	Votes	%	Total	%
Brindabella	58,327	30,330	60.89	19,485	39.11	2,250	4.32	52,065	89.26
Ginninderra	56,749	30,916	64.17	17,259	35.83	2,077	4.13	50,252	88.55
Molonglo	81,883	48,420	68.49	22,273	31.51	2,863	3.89	73,556	89.83
Total	196,959	109,666	65.01	59,017	34.99	7,190	4.09	175,873	89.29

== Endorsements ==
=== Yes campaign ===
==== Political parties ====
- ACT Labor Party
- ACT Liberal Party

==== Individuals ====
- Ted Mack (federal independent MP)
- Malcolm Mackerras (psephologist)
- Bob Brown (former Tasmanian Greens leader)

==== Organisations ====
- Proportional Representation Society of Australia

=== No campaign ===
==== Political parties ====
- Abolish Self Government Coalition

== Opinion polling ==
=== Voting intention ===
Date	Firm	Interview mode	Sample size	Voting intention		
Date	Firm	Interview mode	Sample size	YES	NO	DK
18 February 1992	1995 referendum	—	175,873	65%	35%	—
28 January−7 February 1995	Canberra Times/Datacol	Telephone	916	58%	26%	17%

=== Results by party affiliation ===
Date	Firm	Interview mode	Sample size	Labor			Liberal			Others		
Date	Firm	Interview mode	Sample size	Y	N	DK	Y	N	DK	Y	N	DK
28 January−7 February 1995	Canberra Times/Datacol	Telephone	916	56%	23%	21%	64%	24%	12%	61%	23%	16%
