= 1992 Australian Capital Territory electoral system referendum =

Territorial referendum in Australia

- 15 February 1992
- Please put the number '1' in one of the boxes below to show which electoral system you believe should be used to elect members of the Australian Capital Territory Legislative Assembly. EITHER; A proportional representation (Hare–Clark) system OR; A single member electorates system

Results
| Choice | Votes | % |
|---|---|---|
| Proportional Representation (Hare–Clark) | 101,936 | 65.30% |
| Single-member electorates | 54,165 | 34.70% |
| Valid votes | 156,101 | 94.43% |
| Invalid or blank votes | 9,203 | 5.57% |
| Total votes | 165,304 | 100.00% |
| Registered voters/turnout | 184,405 | 89.64% |

A referendum was held on 15 February 1992, asking voters in the Australian Capital Territory (ACT) to choose their electoral system. The referendum took place alongside the 1992 ACT election.

Voters were asked to choose between the proportional Hare–Clark system (a form of single transferable voting) or Alternative Voting (single-member electorates using ranked voting). The winning option would replace the list PR system using d'Hondt, which had been introduced at the 1989 election).

By a comfortable margin, voters chose Hare–Clark, which came into effect at the 1995 ACT election. A second referendum, also held in 1995, saw voters support entrenching the principles of Hare–Clark.

== Background ==
Under Hare–Clark, the ACT would be divided into two five-member electorates and one seven-member electorate (these became Brindabella, Ginninderra and Molonglo respectively). The only other Australian jurisdiction using Hare–Clark was Tasmania, which used the system for its lower house.

Under single-member electorates, 17 different seats would be created, each electing one MLA. This was the system used in the lower houses of all Australian states (excluding Tasmania, which used it for its upper house) and the federal House of Representatives.

== Campaign ==
Beginning in 1990, ongoing debate took place about the ACT's electoral system. Opinion polling in 1990 and 1991 showed single-member seats with a significant lead, including as high as 53% compared to 27% for Hare–Clark. However, this began to change as the referendum date approached. A January 1992 poll showed single-member seats with only a one-point lead, and in the final Canberra Times/Datacol poll conducted just days before the vote, Hare–Clark had taken the lead with 51% compared to 29% for single-member seats.

== Result ==
Hare–Clark was comfortably chosen as the preferred system, with 65.3% of voters supporting it, while 34.7% voted in favour of single-member electorates. The result was projected on the night of the referendum, with Hare–Clark supporters declaring it as a victory for "people power".

The referendum, like the election, was conducted by the Australian Electoral Commission (AEC).

== Endorsements ==
=== Hare–Clark ===
==== Political parties ====
- ACT Liberal Party
- Australian Democrats
- Better Management Team
- Fair Elections Coalition
- Michael Moore Independent Group
- New Conservative Group
- New Left Party
- Residents Rally

==== Organisations ====
- Australian Conservation Foundation
- Proportional Representation Society of Australia
- The Wilderness Society

==== Individuals ====
- Ted Mack (federal independent MP)
- Malcolm Mackerras (political analyst and psephologist)

==== Newspapers ====
- The Canberra Times

=== Single-member ===
==== Political parties ====
- ACT Labor Party

== Opinion polling ==
=== Voting intention ===
| Date | Firm | Interview mode | Sample size | Voting intention | | |
| Date | Firm | Interview mode | Sample size | PR (Hare–Clark) | Single-member | Undecided |
|---|---|---|---|---|---|---|
| 15 February 1992 | 1992 referendum | | | 63.3% | 34.7% | — |
| 14 February 1992 | Michael Moore Independent Group | Telephone | 275 | 48% | 29% | 23% |
| 6−11 February 1992 | Canberra Times/Datacol | Telephone | 1,333 | 51% | 29% | 20% |
| 26 January 1992 | Canberra Times/Datacol | Telephone | | 38% | 39% | 23% |
| 15−20 December 1991 | Canberra Times/Datacol | Telephone | 915 | 31% | 41% | 28% |
| 30 April−16 May 1991 | Canberra Times/Datacol | Telephone | 808 | 27% | 53% | 20% |
| May 1991 | ABC Television | Telephone (call-in) | 600 | 67% | 33% | —N/a |
| 18−24 August 1990 | Canberra Times/Datacol | Telephone | 601 | 20% | 47% | 33% |

=== Results by party affiliation ===
| Date | Firm | Interview mode | Sample size | Labor | | | Liberal | | | Others | | |
| Date | Firm | Interview mode | Sample size | HC | SM | DK | HC | SM | DK | HC | SM | DK |
|---|---|---|---|---|---|---|---|---|---|---|---|---|
| 6−11 February 1992 | Canberra Times/Datacol | Telephone | 1,333 | 39% | 44% | 18% | 61% | 24% | 15% | 70% | 19% | 12% |
| 26 January 1992 | Canberra Times/Datacol | Telephone | | 32.6% | 48.0% | 19.0% | 44.0% | 37.0% | 18.0% | 46.4% | 33.5% | 20.0% |
| 15−20 December 1991 | Canberra Times/Datacol | Telephone | 915 | 25% | 53% | 22% | 37% | 43% | 20% | 42% | 33% | 25% |
| 30 April−16 May 1991 | Canberra Times/Datacol | Telephone | 808 | 28% | 59% | 14% | 28% | 51% | 21% | 39% | 46% | 14% |
