= Wright system =

Single transferable vote counting rule

The Wright system is a refinement of rules associated with proportional representation by means of the single transferable vote (PR-STV) electoral system. It was developed and written by Anthony van der Craats, a system analyst and life member of the Proportional Representation Society of Australia. It is described in a submission into a parliamentary review of the 2007 Australian federal election.

The aim of the system is to provide an alternative to various methods of segmentation and distribution of preferences associated with the exclusion of a candidate from the count.

It is named after Jack Wright, former president of the Proportional Representation Society of Australia.

== Overview ==
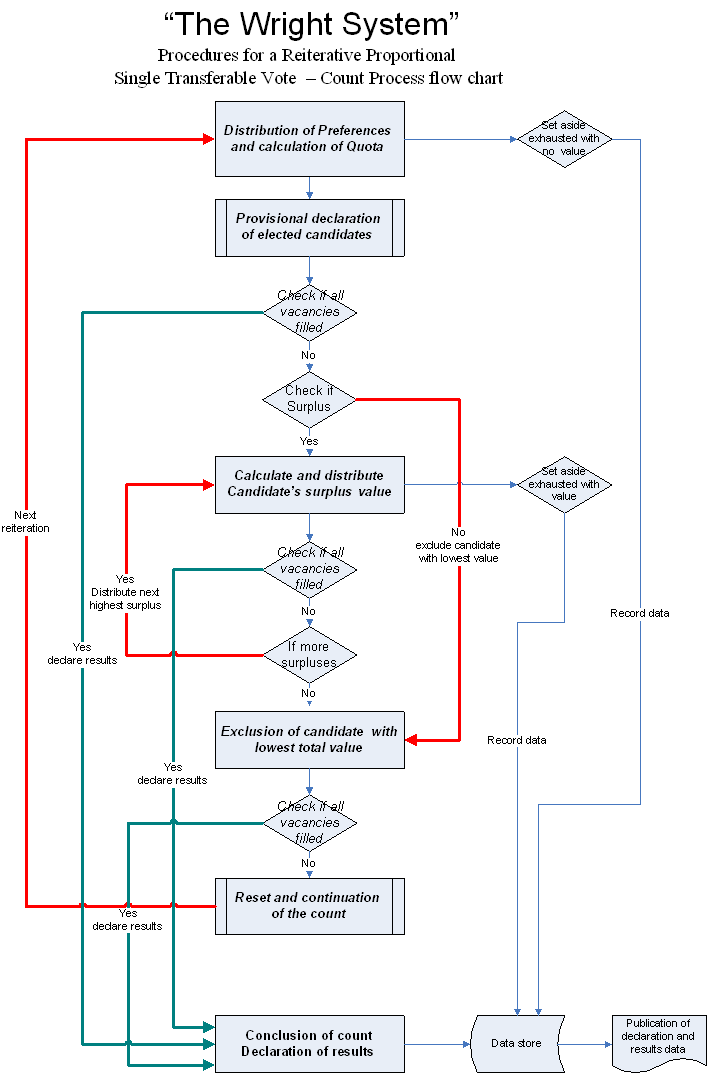
The Wright System - Count Process Flow Chart

The Wright System fulfills the first of the two principles identified by Brian Meek:

- Principle 1. If a candidate is excluded from the count, all ballots are treated as if that candidate had never stood.
- Principle 2. If a candidate has achieved the quota, they retain a fixed proportion of the value of every vote received, and transfers the remainder to the next non-excluded continuing candidate, the value of the retained total equaling the quota.

As regards the second principle it differs in not transferring surpluses to already-elected candidates, a procedure criticized by Meek, but which does make hand-counting more practical.

The system uses the Droop quota (Although this is not an integral part of the system and the author advocates it removal and replacement with a pure proportional quota (x/y)) and the Gregory method of weighted surplus transfer value of the vote in calculating a candidate's surplus transfer value which is then multiplied by the value of each vote received by the candidates whose votes are to be redistributed, as is the case in the Western Australian upper-house elections.

Unlike the Western Australian upper-house electoral system, the Wright System uses a reiterative counting process that differs from the Meek's method as an alternative to the method of segmentation and distribution of excluded candidates' votes.

On every exclusion of a candidate from the count, the counting of the ballot is reset and all valid votes are redistributed to candidates remaining in the count initially at full value.

In each iteration of the count, votes are first distributed according to the voter's first available preference, with each vote assigned a value of one and the total number of votes tabulated for each candidate and the quota calculated on the value of the total number of valid votes.

Any candidate that has a total value equal or greater than the quota is provisionally declared elected and their surplus value distributed according to the voter's nominated subsequent preference. If the number of vacancies are filled on the first distribution the results of the election are declared with all provisionally declared candidates being declared the winner of the election.

If the number of candidates provisionally declared elected is less than the number of vacancies and all candidates' surplus votes have been distributed then the candidate with the lowest value of votes is excluded from the count. The ballot is reset and the process of redistribution restarted with ballot papers being redistributed again according to the voters next available preference allocated to any continuing candidate. This process repeats itself until all vacancies are filled in a single count without the need for any further exclusions.

The Wright System takes into account optional preferential voting in that any votes that do not express a valid preference for a continuing candidate are set aside without-value and the quota is recalculated on each iteration of the count following the distribution of the first available preference. Votes that exhaust as a result of a candidate's surplus transfer are set aside with the value associated with the transfer in which they exhausted.

The main advantage of the Wright System is that it limits the distortion and bias in the vote that arises from the adopted methods of segmentation and distribution of preferences of excluded candidates. Each vote has proportionally equal weight and is treated in the same manner as every other vote.

Under the current system used in the Australian Senate a voter whose first preference is for a minor candidate and their subsequent second preference for a major candidate that has been declared elected earlier in the count is denied the opportunity to have their second preference vote allocated to the candidate of their choice. With the reiterative counting system the voter's second preference forms part of the voter's alternative chosen candidate's surplus and is redistributed according to the voters nominated preference allocation.

Media Report Crikey: Casey Briggs ABC Electoral Analyst

== Definitions ==
Continuing Candidate means a candidate that has not been excluded from or declared not-elected in the process of the count

Total Vote (TV) is the total number of ballot papers that express a valid preference allocated to candidates remaining in the count

Value of the Vote (Vv) means the value allocated to each ballot paper as it progresses though the count.

Candidate’s Total Value of votes (Ctvv) means the aggregated sum of the value of each ballot paper allocated to the candidate.

Surplus Value (Sv) means the value calculated by subtracting the Quota (Q) from the Candidates Total Value’ of votes (Sv = Ctvv-Q)

Surplus Transfer Value (Stv) means the value calculated by the Surplus value (Sv) divided by the Candidate’s Total Value of votes (Ctvv) and then multiplied by the Value of vote (Vv) allocated to each ballot paper ((Stv = Sv/Ctvv)*Vv)

Ballot Paper means a record of a voter’s intention and allocation, in ascending order of preference, of support for a nominated candidate for election. It also refers to a vote which is a record in electronic format representing information and preference allocations of a ballot paper.

Vote means a mathematical representation and record of a ballot paper

Preference means the number in ascending order that represents the order of voter’s preference attributed to a candidate for election as recorded on a ballot paper or data file.

Electronic preference data file means an electronic data file representing the allocation and record of preferences and all votes/ballot papers used in the calculation, distribution and determination of the results of the election.

Remainders represent the fractional part arising from a mathematical division recorded in double precision and are to be retained with and form part of the value of the vote and/or the total value attributed to a candidate

Exhausted Votes means the aggregated value attributed to any votes that do not express a valid preference for a candidate remaining within the count. The ballot paper and its attributed value are declared exhausted and a tally of all exhausted votes recorded.

Bulk exclusion means the method of determining the number of candidates which can be simultaneously excluded from the count

Running Sum means the progressive calculation the sum of all candidates total votes from lowest to highest in descending order

Quota Breakpoint means highest running sum value that is less than half of the Quota

Running Breakpoint means the candidate with a total vote value that is greater than the associated running sum of all candidates with a lower total vote.

Applied Breakpoint means the candidate with a highest total vote that is less than the associated running sum of all candidates with a lower total vote and less than the difference between the Quota and the value of the highest scoring candidate that is below Quota.

== Process of calculation of the results of the election ==
All ballot papers must be checked for formality and reconciled with the electoral roll and polling place returns following the completion of the data-entry process and prior to the commencement of the counting procedure outlined below. Any informal ballot papers must be set aside and recorded with no value.

=== Distribution of Preferences and calculation of Quota ===
Ballot Papers are distributed according to the first available preference in ascending order that corresponds to a Continuing Candidate.

1. Any ballot paper that does not express a transferable preference for a continuing candidate is declared exhausted-without-value and recorded with a value of zero.
2. Assign each ballot paper allocated to a Continuing Candidate a Vote value of one.
3. Ascertain and assign the Candidate’s Total Value of the Vote (Ctvv) for each Continuing Candidate by aggregating the value of the votes allocated to each Continuing Candidate.
4. Ascertain and assign the Total Vote (TV) value by aggregating the total value of votes allocated to each candidate outlined in (c) above.
5. Calculate the Quota required to elect a candidate by dividing the Total Vote (TV) by the number of candidatesrequired to be elected and by increasing the quotient (disregarding any remainder)

=== Provisional declaration of elected candidates ===
Any candidate who has received a Total value of votes (Ctvv) equal to or greater than the Quota (Q) is to be provisionally declared elected.

=== Number of vacancies filled ===
If the number of candidates provisionally declared elected equals the number of vacancies to be filled then the count is concluded (Goto Conclusion of the count)

=== Number of elected candidates less than vacancies ===
If the number of candidates provisionally declared elected is less than the number of vacancies to be elected and the number of all other Continuing Candidates is greater than the number of vacancies still remaining then the procedure of the count is as follows:-

=== Calculation of the Candidate’s Surplus Value ===
In descending order of the Candidates' Total value of votes (Ctvv) for each provisionally elected candidate, starting from the candidate with the highest total value of votes whose surplus is to be distributed, calculate the Surplus value (Sv) of the candidate by subtracting the Quota from the Candidate’s Total Value of the Vote and then determine, distribute and allocate the Candidate's Surplus Transfer value according to the procedure outlined below (2.6 and 2.7 inclusive)

=== Calculation of the Surplus Transfer Value and value of the vote ===
The candidate’s Surplus Transfer Value (Stv) is determined by calculating the quotient of the candidate’s Surplus value (Sv) divided by the Candidate’s Total Value of the Vote (Ctvv) and multiplying the result by the value of each ballot paper (Vv) allocated to the Candidate whose surplus is being considered. The resultant becomes the new Value of the vote allocated to each ballot paper the sum of which equals the Surplus value (Sv).

=== Distribution of Candidate’s Surplus votes ===
All ballot papers allocated to the Candidate whose surplus is under consideration are to be redistributed according to the following procedure:

All ballot papers that express a preference greater than the preference allocated to the candidate whose surplus is to be distributed shall be distributed and re-allocated to the candidate that remains in the count (excluding any candidate that has already been provisionally declared elected) according to the next available sequentially highest preference recorded on the ballot paper.

==== Exhausted Ballot papers to be set aside ====
Any ballot paper that does not express a valid preference for a continuing candidate greater than the preference allocated to the candidates whose surplus is to be distributed shall be set aside and declared exhausted-with-value and its value added to the total value of exhausted ballot papers recorded for the relevant transaction in the count. Exhausted votes that form part of a candidates surplus remain in the count and form part of the initial candidate’s Total Vote and surplus.

==== Allocate value of quota to candidate whose surplus has been distributed ====
The Candidate whose Surplus has been distributed is allocated a Candidate’s Total Value of votes equal to the Quota.

==== Ascertain if any Candidates are to be provisionally elected as a result of the surplus transfer distribution ====
Any Continuing Candidate who has received a total value of votes equal to or greater than the quota on the completion of the transfer and distribution of all ballot papers associated with the surplus distribution shall be provisionally declared elected.

==== Number of Candidates provisionally elected equal the number of vacancies ====
If as a result of the completed surplus transfer the number of candidates provisionally declared elected equals the number of vacancies to be filled then the count is concluded (Goto Conclusion of the count)

==== Distribution of additional surplus votes ====
If the number of candidates provisionally declared elected is less than the number of vacancies to be filled and there remain candidates who have a surplus value that has not been transferred and distributed then the votes allocated to the candidate with the next highest surplus value is to be transferred and redistributed according to the procedure outlined above (2.6 and 2.7 inclusive)

=== Exclusion of candidates ===
If the number of candidates provisionally declared elected is less than the number of vacancies to be filled and there are no further candidate surpluses to be distributed then the candidate with the lowest total value of votes is to be declared not-elected and excluded from the count.

==== Bulk Exclusion (option) ====
Two or more candidates may be excluded simultaneously by determining the Applied Breakpoint, if the aggregated value of all candidates to be excluded is less than the value of the next lowest candidate or the value required by a candidate to obtain a quota. The calculation of Quota Break point or the highest associated Running Break Point values associated with a continuing candidate. Breakpoints assists in the determination of applying a Bulk Exclusion process. If the Quota, Applied and Running Breakpoints converge then it is generally safe to apply a Bulk Exclusion process to the count. Careful consideration needs to be given to ensure that candidates with a lower total value are not capable of securing a higher total vote than the candidates remaining in the count.

==== Tie in the value of a candidates the vote ====
If there are two or more candidates of equal value with the lowest total value of the vote then the candidate to be excluded from the count shall be determined by lot and declared not-elected.

=== Number of candidates declared elected and remaining in the count equal the number of vacancies ===
If as a result of any exclusion the number of candidates provisionally declared elected plus the number of remaining candidates equals the number of vacancies to be filled then the count is concluded and all candidates that remain in the count are all declared provisionally elected (Goto Conclusion of the count)

=== Reset and continuation of the count ===
If the number of Continuing Candidates, including candidates that have been provisionally elected, is greater than the number of vacancies plus one following the exclusion of any candidate, the ballot shall be reset and the distribution of preferences shall be restarted according to the procedures outlined above in sections 2.1 to 2.10 excluding all candidates that have been declared not-elected and excluded from the count.

=== Reiteration of the count ===
The count continues to proceed according to the procedures outlined above until either the number of provisionally declared elected candidates or the number of candidates remaining in the count equals the number of vacancies to be filled in which case all Continuing Candidates are declared provisionally elected.

=== Conclusion of the count ===
At the conclusion of the reiterative count all candidates that have been provisionally elected in the final count reiteration are declared elected following the publication of the election results and a certified copy of the detailed electronic preference data file used in tabulating the results of the election.
