= Counting single transferable votes =

How choices are tallied under multi-winner ranked-choice voting

The single transferable vote (STV) is a proportional representation system and also a ranked vote system that elects multiple winners. Under STV, an elector's vote is initially allocated to their first-ranked candidate. Candidates are elected (winners) if their vote tally exceeds the electoral quota. Surplus votes (those exceeding quota) may be transferred from winners to the remaining candidates (hopefuls) according to the surplus ballots' next usable back-up preference.

The system attempts to ensure factions are represented proportionally, without the need for official party lists, by having each winner elected with roughly the same number of votes. There are several variants of the single transferable vote. Each may produce different results.

== Voting ==
When using an STV ballot, the voter ranks candidates on the ballot. For example:

Andrea	2
Carter	1
Brad	4
Delilah	3
Sam	

Some, but not all, single transferable vote systems require a preference to be expressed for every candidate, or for the voter to express at least a minimum number of preferences. Others allow a voter just to mark one preference if that is the voter's desire.

The vote will be used to elect just one candidate at the most, in the end.

== Quota ==
The quota (sometimes called the threshold) is the number of votes that guarantees election of a candidate. Some candidates may be elected without reaching the quota, but any candidate who receives quota is elected.

The Hare quota and the Droop quota are the common types of quota.

The quota is typically set based on the number of valid votes cast, and even if the number of votes in play decreases through the vote count process, the quota remains as set throughout the process.

Meek's counting method recomputes the quota on each iteration of the count, as described below.

=== Hare quota ===
When Thomas Hare originally conceived his version of single transferable vote, he envisioned using the quota:

$\frac{\text{votes}}{\text{seats}}$

The Hare quota is mathematically simple. Its large size means that elected members have fewer surplus votes and thus other candidates do not benefit from as many vote transfers as they would in other systems. Some candidates may be eliminated in the process who may not have been eliminated under systems that transfer more surplus votes. Their elimination may cause a degree of disproportionality that would be less likely with a lower quota, such as the Droop quota.

=== Droop quota ===
The most common quota formula is the Droop quota, which is a number larger than this amount:

$\frac{\text{votes}}{\text{seats}+1}$

The Droop quota is always a smaller number of votes than computed by the Hare method.

Because of this difference, under Droop it is more likely that winners achieve the quota rather than being elected as the last remaining candidate after other candidates are eliminated or elected. But in real-life elections, if valid ballots do not require every candidate to be ranked, it is common even under Droop for one or two candidates to be elected with partial quota at the end, as the field of candidates is thinned to the number of remaining open seats and as the valid votes still in play become scarcer.

The use of Droop leaves out about a full quota's worth of votes, either declared exhausted or held by unsuccessful candidates, and thus to be ignored. Unlike a system using the Hare quota and mandatory full marking of the ballot, with STV variants that use optional preferential voting and the Droop quota, a certain percentage of ballots are not used to elect anyone. As a result, the Droop quota is said by some to tend towards disproportionality and to be biased in favor of large parties.

The Droop quota and Hare–Clark electoral system were designed to facilitate a manual counting system. With the introduction of computer-based counting systems, some consider them to be outdated and flawed, failing to reflect the intentions of voters. With the adoption of computer-based technology, a reiterative vote-counting system such as the Wright system may be preferred as it more accurately reflects voters' intentions. Under a reiterative system, there is no need or justification for the use of the Droop quota.

However, most STV systems used in the world use Droop. Many say it is more fair to large parties than Hare. Under Droop, a group consisting of at least half of all voters is guaranteed to win control of at least half of all seats, which is not always the case using the Hare quota. As well, Droop – being smaller than Hare – may give a seat to a smaller party, which is not achieved under Hare.

== Counting rules ==
Until all seats have been filled, votes are successively transferred to one or more "hopeful" candidates (those who are not yet elected or eliminated) from two sources:

- Surplus votes (i.e. those in excess of the quota) of elected candidates (whole votes or all votes at fractional values)
- All votes of eliminated candidates

In either case, some votes may be non-transferable as they bear no marked back-up preferences for any non-elected, non-eliminated candidate.

The possible algorithms for effecting these transfer differ in detail, e.g., in the order of the steps. There is no general agreement on which is best, and the choice of method used may affect the outcome. The steps are:

1. Compute the quota.
2. Assign votes to candidates by first preferences.
3. Declare as winners all candidates who have achieved at least the quota.
4. Transfer the excess votes from winners, if any, to hopefuls.
5. Repeat 3–4 until no new candidates are elected. (Under some systems, votes could initially be transferred in this step to prior winners or losers. This might affect the outcome.)
6. If these steps result in all the seats being filled, the process is complete. Otherwise:
7. Eliminate one or more candidates, typically either the candidate with the fewest votes or all candidates whose combined votes are less than the votes attained by the next highest candidate.
8. Transfer the votes of the eliminated candidates to remaining hopeful candidates.
9. Return to step 3 and go through the loop until all seats are filled. (The last seat or seats might have to be filled by the few remaining candidates when the field of candidates thins to the number of remaining open seats, even if the remaining candidates have not achieved quota.)

== Surplus vote transfers ==
To minimize wasted votes, surplus votes are transferred to other candidates if possible. The number of surplus votes is known, but none of the various allocation methods is universally preferred. Alternatives exist for deciding which votes to transfer, how to weight the transfers, who receives the votes and the order in which surpluses from two or more winners are transferred. Transfers are attempted when a candidate receives more votes than the quota. Excess votes are transferred to remaining candidates, where possible.

A winner's surplus votes are transferred according to their next usable marked preference. Transfers are only done if there are still seats to fill. In some systems, surplus votes are transferred only if they could possibly re-order the ranking of the two least-popular candidates.

In systems where exhausted votes can exist, such as optional preferential voting, if the number of votes bearing a next usable marked preference are fewer than the surplus votes, then the transferable votes are simply transferred based on the next usable preference.

If the transferable votes surpass the surplus, then the transfer is done using a formula (p/t)*s, where s is a number of surplus votes to be transferred, t is a total number of transferable votes (that have a usable next preference) and p is a number of usable next preferences for the given candidate. This is the whole-vote method used in the national elections of Ireland and Malta. Transfers are done using whole votes, with some of the votes that are directed to another candidate left behind with the winner and others of the same sort of votes moved in whole to the indicated candidate. Lower preferences piggybacked on the ballots may not be perfectly random and this may affect later transfers. This method can be made easier if only the last incoming parcel of votes is used to determine the transfer, rather than all of the successful candidate's votes. Such a method is used to elect the lower houses in the Australian Capital Territory (ACT) and in Tasmania.

Under some systems, a fraction of the vote is transferred, with a fraction left behind with the winner. As all votes are transferred (but at fractional value), there is no randomness and exact reduction of the successful candidate's votes are guaranteed. However the fractions may be tedious to work with.

=== Hare STV and the whole-vote method of transferring surplus votes ===
If the transfer is of surplus received in the first count, transfers are done in reference to all the votes held by the successful candidate.

If the transfer is of surplus received after the first count through transfer from another candidate, transfers are done in reference to all the votes held by the successful candidate or merely in reference to the most recent transfer received by the successful candidate.

Reallocation ballots are drawn at random from those most recently received. In a manual count of paper ballots, this is the easiest method to implement.

Votes are transferred as whole votes. Fractional votes are not used.

This system is close to Thomas Hare's original 1857 proposal. It is used in elections in the Republic of Ireland to Dáil Éireann (the lower chamber), to local government, to the European Parliament, and to the university constituencies in Seanad Éireann (the upper chamber).

This is sometimes described as "random" because it does not consider later back-up preferences but only the next usable one. Through random drawing of the votes to make up the transfer, statistically the transfers often reflect the make-up of the votes held by the successful candidate.

Sometimes, ballots of the elected candidate are manually mixed. In Cambridge, Massachusetts, votes are counted one precinct at a time, imposing a spurious ordering on the votes. To prevent all transferred ballots coming from the same precinct, every $n$th ballot is selected, where
$$\begin{matrix} \frac {1} {n} \end{matrix}$$
is the fraction to be selected.

=== Wright system ===
The Wright system is a reiterative linear counting process where on each candidate's exclusion, the quota is reset and the votes recounted, distributing votes according to the voters' nominated order of preference, excluding candidates removed from the count as if they had not been nominated.

For each successful candidate that exceeds the quota threshold, calculate the ratio of that candidate's surplus votes (i.e., the excess over the quota) divided by the total number of votes for that candidate, including the value of previous transfers. Transfer that candidate's votes to each voter's next preferred hopeful. Increase the recipient's vote tally by the product of the ratio and the ballot's value as the previous transfer (1 for the initial count.)

Every preference continues to count until the choices on that ballot have been exhausted or the election is complete. Its main disadvantage is that given large numbers of votes, candidates, or seats, counting is administratively burdensome for a manual count due to the number of interactions. This is not the case with the use of computerized distribution of preference votes.

=== Hare–Clark ===
This variation is used in Tasmanian and ACT lower house elections in Australia. The Gregory method (transferring fractional votes) is used, but the allocation of transfers is based just on the next usable preference marked on the votes of the last bundle transferred to the successful candidate.

The last bundle transfer method has been criticized as being inherently flawed in that only one segment of votes is used to transfer the value of surplus votes, denying the other voters who contributed to a candidate's success a say in the surplus distribution. In the following explanation, Q is the quota required for election.

1. Count the first preferences votes.
2. Declare as winners those candidates whose total is at least Q.
3. For each winner, compute the surplus (total number of votes minus Q).
4. For each winner, in order of descending surplus:
  1. Assign that winner's ballots to candidates according to the next usable preference on each ballot of the last parcel received, setting aside exhausted ballots.
  2. Calculate the ratio of surplus to the number of reassigned ballots or 1 if the number of such ballots is less than surplus.
  3. For each candidate, multiply the ratio by the number of that candidate's reassigned votes and add the result (rounded down) to the candidate's tally.
5. Repeat 3–5 until winners fill all seats, or all ballots are exhausted.
6. If more winners are needed, declare as loser the candidate with the fewest votes, and reassign that candidate's ballots according to each ballot's next preference.

=== Example ===
Two seats need to be filled among four candidates: Andrea, Brad, Carter, and Delilah. 57 voters cast ballots with the following preference orderings:

1st	Andrea	Andrea	Delilah
2nd	Brad	Carter	Andrea
3rd	Carter	Brad	Brad
4th	Delilah	Delilah	Carter
Total	23	16	17

The quota is calculated as ${57 \over 2+1} = 19$. In the first round, Andrea is elected, and her 20 surplus votes are transferred. In the second, Carter, the candidate with the fewest votes, is excluded. His 8 votes have Brad as the next choice. This gives Brad 20 votes (exceeding the quota), electing him to the second seat:

Count:	Andrea	Brad	Carter	Delilah	Result
1st	39	0	0	17	Andrea elected
2nd	19	12	~~8~~	17	Carter eliminated
3rd	19	20	~~0~~	17	Brad elected

Other systems, such as the ones used in Ashtabula, Kalamazoo, Sacramento and Cleveland, prescribe that the votes to be transferred will be drawn at random but in equal numbers from each polling place. In the STV system used in Cincinnati (1924–1957) and in Cambridge city elections, votes received by a winning candidate were numbered sequentially; then, if the surplus votes made up one quarter of the votes held by the successful candidate, each vote that was numbered a multiple of four was extracted and moved to the next usable marked preference on each of those votes. (In British, Irish and Canadian uses of STV, the whole-vote method outlined above was used.)

=== Gregory ===
The Gregory method, known as Senatorial rules (after its use for most seats in Irish Senate elections), or the Gregory method (after its inventor in 1880, J. B. Gregory of Melbourne) eliminates all randomness. Instead of transferring a fraction of votes at full value, it transfers each of the relevant votes at a fractional value.

In the above example, the relevant fraction is $\textstyle\frac{72}{272 - 92} = \frac{4}{10}$. Note that part of the 272 vote result may be from earlier transfers; e.g., perhaps Y had been elected with 250 votes, 150 with X as next preference, so that the previous transfer of 30 votes was actually 150 ballots at a value of $\textstyle \frac15$. In this case, these 150 ballots would now be retransferred with a compounded fractional value of $\textstyle \frac15 \times \frac{4}{10} = \frac{4}{50}$.

In the Republic of Ireland, the Gregory Method is used for elections to the 43 seats on the vocational panels in Seanad Éireann, whose franchise is restricted to 949 members of local authorities and members of the Oireachtas (the Irish Parliament). In Northern Ireland, the Gregory Method has been used since 1973 for all STV elections, with up to 7 fractional transfers (in 8-seat district council elections), and up to 700,000 votes counted (in 3-seat European Parliament elections for the Northern Ireland EU constituency from 1979 to 2020).

An alternative means of expressing Gregory in calculating the surplus transfer value applied to each vote is
$$\text{surplus transfer value} = \left({{\text{total value of candidate's votes} - \text{quota}} \over \text{total value of candidate's votes}} \right)\times \text{value of each vote}$$

The unweighted inclusive Gregory method is used for the Australian Senate. This method weights all ballot papers for the elected candidate equally. This can have the effect of distorting the transfer values where a significant number of ballot papers have been transferred at a low rate.
$$\text{surplus transfer value} = {{\text{total value of candidate's votes} - \text{quota}} \over \text{ballot papers for candidate}}$$

That problem is overcome in the weighted inclusive Gregory method.

Some Gregory methods in use transfer only whole numbers composed by totalling the various fractional votes. This simplifies the math.

=== Transfer using a party-list allocation method ===
The effect of the Gregory system can be replicated without using fractional values by a party-list proportional allocation method, such as D'Hondt, Webster/Sainte-Laguë or Hare–Niemeyer. A party-list proportional representation electoral system allocates a share of the seats in a legislature to a political party in proportion to its share of the votes, a task which is mathematically equivalent to establishing a share of surplus votes to be transferred to a hopeful candidate based on the overall vote for an eliminated candidate.

Example: If the quota is 200 and a winner has 272 first-choice votes, then the surplus is 72 votes. If 92 of the winner's 272 votes have no other hopeful listed, then the remaining 180 votes have a second-choice selection and can be transferred.

Of the 180 votes which can be transferred, 75 have hopeful X as their second choice, 43 have hopeful Y as their second choice, and 62 have hopeful Z as their second choice. The D'Hondt system is applied to determine how the surplus votes would be transferred – successive quotients are calculated for each hopeful candidate, one surplus vote is transferred to the hopeful candidate with the largest quotient, and the hopeful candidate's quotient is recalculated; this is repeated until all surplus votes have been transferred.

Divisor	1	2	3–16	17	18	19–24	25	26	27–29	30	31
X	75	37.5	...	4.411765	4.166667	...	3	2.884615	...	2.5	2.419355
Y	43	21.5	...	2.529412	2.388889	...	1.72	1.653846	...	1.433333	1.387097
Z	62	31	...	3.647059	3.444444	...	2.48	2.384615	...	2.066667	2

As a result of this process, 30 surplus votes have been transferred to hopeful X, 17 to hopeful Y, and 25 to hopeful Z.

== Secondary preferences for prior winners ==
Suppose a ballot is to be transferred and its next preference is for a winner in a prior round. Hare and Gregory ignore such preferences and transfer the ballot to the next usable marked preference if any.

In other systems, the vote could be transferred to that winner and the process continued. For example, a prior winner X could receive 20 transfers from second round winner Y. Then select 20 at random from the 220 for transfer from X. However, some of these 20 ballots may then transfer back from X to Y, creating recursion. In the case of the Senatorial rules, since all votes are transferred at all stages, the recursion is infinite, with ever-decreasing fractions.

=== Meek ===
In 1969, B. L. Meek devised a vote counting algorithm based on the Senatorial (Gregory) vote counting rules. The Meek algorithm uses an iterative approximation to short-circuit the infinite recursion that results when there are secondary preferences for prior winners. This system is currently used for some local elections in New Zealand, and for elections of moderators on some internet websites, e.g. Stack Exchange portals.

All candidates are allocated one of three statuses – hopeful, elected, or excluded. Hopeful is the default. Each status has a weighting, or keep value, which is the fraction of the vote a candidate will receive for any preferences allocated to them while holding that status.

The weightings are:

Hopeful	$1$
Excluded	$0$
Elected	$w_\text{new} = w_\text{old} \times \frac{\text{Quota}}{\text{Candidate's votes}}$ which is repeated until $\text{Candidate's votes} = \text{Quota}$ for all elected candidates

Thus, if a candidate is hopeful, they retain the whole of the remaining preferences allocated to them, and subsequent preferences are worth 0.

If a candidate is elected, they retain the portion of the value of the preferences allocated to them that is the value of their weighting; the remainder is passed fractionally to subsequent preferences depending on their weighting. For example, consider a ballot with top preferences A, B, C, and D in that order, where the weightings of the candidates are $a$, $b$, $c$, and $d$, respectively. From this ballot A will retain $r_A = a$, B will retain $r_B = (1-a) b$, C will retain $r_C = (1-a) (1-b) c$, and D will retain $r_D = (1-a) (1-b) (1-c) d$.

If no candidate on a ballot has a weight of 1 then the sum total retained by the candidates on the ballot will be strictly less than 1. The amount by which 1 exceeds the ballot's total is called the "excess", and the total excess from all ballots is disposed of by altering the quota. Meek's method is the only method to change quota mid-process. The quota is found by

$${{\text{votes} - \text{excess}} \over \text{seats}+1},$$
a variation on Droop. This has the effect of also altering the weighting for each candidate.

This process continues until all the elected candidates' vote values closely match the quota (plus or minus 0.0001%).

=== Warren ===
In 1994, C. H. E. Warren proposed another method of passing surplus votes to previously elected candidates. Warren is identical to Meek except in the numbers of votes retained by winners. Under Warren, rather than retaining that proportion of each vote's value given by multiplying the weighting by the vote's value, the candidate retains that amount of a whole vote given by the weighting, or else whatever remains of the vote's value if that is less than the weighting.

Consider again a ballot with top preferences A, B, C, and D where the weightings are a, b, c, and d. Under Warren's method, A will retain r_{A} = a, B will retain r_{B} = min(b, 1−r_{A}), C will retain r_{C} = min(c, 1−r_{A}−r_{B}), and D will retain r_{D} = min(d, 1−r_{A}−r_{B}−r_{C}).

Because candidates receive different values of votes, the weightings determined by Warren are in general different from Meek.

Under Warren, every vote that contributes to a candidate contributes, as far as it is able, the same portion as every other such vote.

== Distribution of excluded candidate preferences ==
The method used in determining the order of exclusion and distribution of a candidates' votes can affect the outcome, and multiple such systems are in use. Most systems (with the exception of an iterative count) were designed for manual counting processes and can produce different outcomes.

The general principle that applies to each method is to exclude the candidate that has the lowest tally. Systems must handle ties for the lowest tally. Alternatives include excluding the candidate with the lowest score in the previous round and choosing by lot.

Exclusion methods commonly in use:

- Single transaction—Transfer all votes for a loser in a single transaction without segmentation.
- Segmented distribution—Split distributed ballots into small, segmented transactions. Consider each segment a complete transaction, including checking for candidates who have reached quota. Generally, a smaller number and value of votes per segment reduces the likelihood of affecting the outcome.
  - Value-based segmentation—Each segment includes all ballots that have the same value.
  - Aggregated primary vote and value segmentation—Separate the primary vote (full-value votes) to reduce distortion and limit the subsequent value of a transfer from a candidate elected as result of a segmented transfer.
  - FIFO (first in first out – last bundle)—Distribute each parcel in the order in which it was received. This method produces the smallest size and impact of each segment at the cost of requiring more steps to complete a count.
- Iterative count—After excluding a loser, reallocate the loser's ballots and restart the count. An iterative count treats each ballot as though that loser had not stood. Ballots can be allocated to prior winners using a segmented distribution process. Surplus votes are distributed only within each iteration. Iterative counts are usually automated to reduce costs. The number of iterations can be limited by applying a method of bulk exclusion.

=== Bulk exclusions ===
Bulk exclusion rules can reduce the number of steps required within a count. Bulk exclusion requires the calculation of breakpoints. Any candidates with a tally less than a breakpoint can be included in a bulk exclusion process provided the value of the associated running sum is not greater than the difference between the total value of the highest hopeful's tally and the quota.

To determine a breakpoint, list in descending order each candidate's tally and calculate the running tally of all candidates' votes that are less than the associated candidate's tally. The four types are:

- Quota breakpoint—The highest running total value that is less than half of the quota
- Running breakpoint—The highest candidate's tally that is less than the associated running total
- Group breakpoint—The highest candidate's tally in a group that is less than the associated running total of group candidates whose tally is less than the associated candidate's tally. (This only applies where there are defined groups of candidates, such as in Australian public elections, which use an above-the-line group voting method.)
- Applied breakpoint—The highest running total that is less than the difference between the highest candidate's tally and the quota (i.e. the tally of lower-scoring candidates votes does not affect the outcome). All candidates above an applied breakpoint continue in the next iteration.

Quota breakpoints may not apply with optional preferential ballots or if more than one seat is open. Candidates above the applied breakpoint should not be included in a bulk exclusion process unless it is an adjacent quota or running breakpoint (see 2007 Tasmanian Senate count example below).

==== Example ====
Quota breakpoint (based on the 2007 Queensland Senate election results just prior to the first exclusion):

Candidate	Ballot position	GroupAb	Group name	Score	Running sum	Breakpoint / status
Macdonald, Ian Douglas	J-1	LNP	Liberal	345559		Quota
Hogg, John Joseph	O-1	ALP	Australian Labor Party	345559		Quota
Boyce, Sue	J-2	LNP	Liberal	345559		Quota
Moore, Claire	O-2	ALP	Australian Labor Party	345559		Quota
Boswell, Ron	J-3	LNP	Liberal	284488	1043927	Contest
Waters, Larissa	O-3	ALP	Australian Labor Party	254971	759439	Contest
Furner, Mark	M-1	GRN	The Greens	176511	504468	Contest
Hanson, Pauline	R-1	HAN	Pauline	101592	327957	Contest
Buchanan, Jeff	H-1	FFP	Family First	52838	226365	Contest
Bartlett, Andrew	I-1	DEM	Democrats	45395	173527	Contest
Smith, Bob	G-1	AFLP	The Fishing Party	20277	128132	Quota breakpoint
Collins, Kevin	P-1	FP	Australian Fishing and Lifestyle Party	19081	107855	Contest
Bousfield, Anne	A-1	WWW	What Women Want (Australia)	17283	88774	Contest
Feeney, Paul Joseph	L-1	ASP	The Australian Shooters Party	12857	71491	Contest
Johnson, Phil	C-1	CCC	Climate Change Coalition	8702	58634	Applied Breakpoint
Jackson, Noel	V-1	DLP	Democratic Labor Party	7255	49932	
Others				42677	42677	

Running breakpoint (based on the 2007 Tasmanian Senate election results just prior to the first exclusion):

Candidate	Ballot position	GroupAb	Group name	Score	Running sum	Breakpoint / status
Sherry, Nick	D-1	ALP	Australian Labor Party	46693		Quota
Colbeck, Richard M	F-1	LP	Liberal	46693		Quota
Brown, Bob	B-1	GRN	The Greens	46693		Quota
Brown, Carol	D-2	ALP	Australian Labor Party	46693		Quota
Bushby, David	F-2	LP	Liberal	46693		Quota
Bilyk, Catryna	D-3	ALP	Australian Labor Party	37189		Contest
Morris, Don	F-3	LP	Liberal	28586		Contest
Wilkie, Andrew	B-2	GRN	The Greens	12193	27607	Running breakpoint
Petrusma, Jacquie	K-1	FFP	Family First	6471	15414	Quota breakpoint
Cashion, Debra	A-1	WWW	What Women Want (Australia)	2487	8943	Applied breakpoint
Crea, Pat	E-1	DLP	Democratic Labor Party	2027	6457	
Ottavi, Dino	G-1	UN3		1347	4430	
Martin, Steve	C-1	UN1		848	3083	
Houghton, Sophie Louise	B-3	GRN	The Greens	353	2236	
Larner, Caroline	J-1	CEC	Citizens Electoral Council	311	1883	
Ireland, Bede	I-1	LDP	LDP	298	1573	
Doyle, Robyn	H-1	UN2		245	1275	
Bennett, Andrew	K-2	FFP	Family First	174	1030	
Roberts, Betty	K-3	FFP	Family First	158	856	
Jordan, Scott	B-4	GRN	The Greens	139	698	
Gleeson, Belinda	A-2	WWW	What Women Want (Australia)	135	558	
Shackcloth, Joan	E-2	DLP	Democratic Labor Party	116	423	
Smallbane, Chris	G-3	UN3		102	307	
Cook, Mick	G-2	UN3		74	205	
Hammond, David	H-2	UN2		53	132	
Nelson, Karley	C-2	UN1		35	79	
Phibbs, Michael	J-2	CEC	Citizens Electoral Council	23	44	
Hamilton, Luke	I-2	LDP	LDP	21	21	

== See also ==
- Electoral quota
- IRV implementations in United States#Independence Party of Minnesota (2004 Presidential poll)
- Voting matters, journal comparing and critiquing actual and theoretical varieties of STV and related voting systems.
