= Political groups (Australia) =

In Australia, Political Groups (also known as Group Tickets, or simply Groups) are temporary associations made for the purpose of forming a ticket for elections to the upper houses of Australia, most notably the Australian Senate. In most upper houses and the ACT Legislative Assembly, elections are done under a special form of the Single Transferable Voting system in which a voter can vote for each candidate or a one political group of candidates. These groups tend to dissolve after the election is over, especially if one is made by an independent candidate or a group of independents. They are very similar to parties in many respects except the name. Political parties usually form their own group tickets under the party name, with changes ranging from major (replacing an entire group with new candidates) to minor (replacing one or two, or raising the position of a lower listed candidate to a higher position in the group) after each election.

== Example: 2013 federal election ==
An example of groups are those running for the Australia Senate in the 2013 election. They are as follows:

=== New South Wales ===
- Group F (Andrew Whalan)
- Group AG (Tom Wang)

=== Victoria ===
- Group T (Joseph Toscano)
- Group AJ (Bob Nicholls)

=== Queensland ===
- Keioskie/Taylor
- Rudd/Dinsey

=== Western Australia ===
None in this election

=== South Australia ===
- Nick Xenophon Group (Ticket 1)
- Nick Xenophon Group (Ticket 2)
- Group I (Ribnga Green)
- Group L (Dianah Mielgich)

=== Tasmania ===
None in this election

== Example: 2016 Federal Election ==
The 2016 Australian federal election was the first held under new Senate voting reforms that abolished Group Voting Tickets (GVTs). Voters were required to number at least six boxes above the line or twelve below the line.

Despite the end of GVTs, candidate groups still appeared as columns on the Senate ballot papers. In New South Wales, for example, groups included:

Group A- Liberal/National Coalition

Group B- Australian Labor Party

Group C- The Greens

Group D- Christian Democratic Party (Fred Nile Group)

Group E- Shooters, Fishers, and Farmers Party

Group F- Australian Cyclists Party

Group G- Voluntary Eunthanasia Party

Group T- Independents

These groups functioned as aligned slates of candidates, often affiliated with political parties or single-issue movements.

== See also ==
- Politics of Australia
