= Proportional Representation Society of Australia =

Australian electoral reform organisation

Proportional Representation Society of Australia Inc. (PRSA Inc.) is an electoral reform organisation in Australia. Its membership includes people that have successfully promoted electoral reform.

The Society regularly reviews and makes submissions on electoral reform within Australia with a focus on implementing proportional representation through the single transferable vote. It has made submissions to international organizations including the United Nations and the New Zealand Parliament.

== History ==
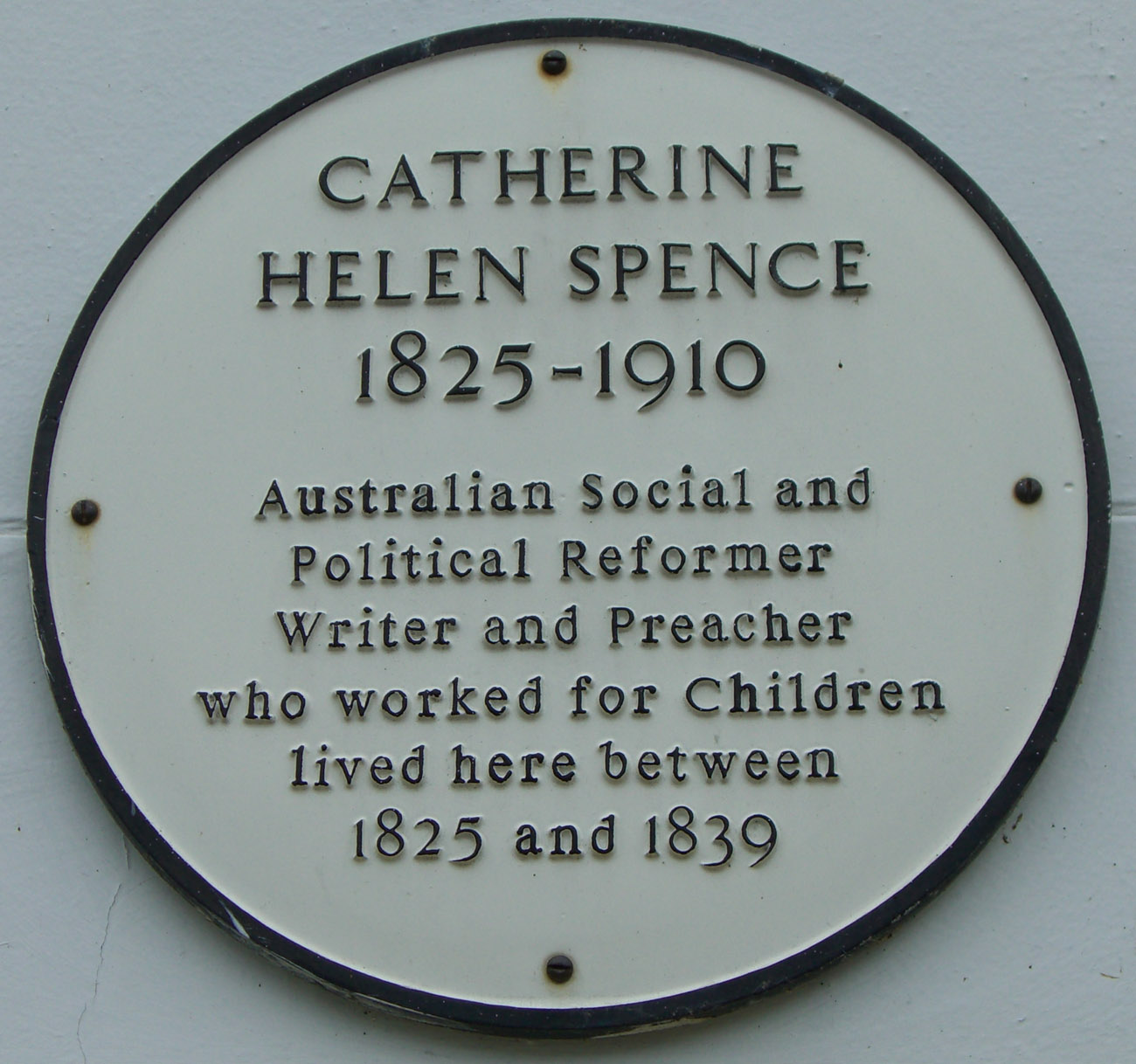
A wall plaque at the Townhouse Hotel in Melrose, Scotland, dedicated to Catherine Helen Spence

Forerunners of the Society began before Australian Federation with Catherine Helen Spence as one of their founding members. See details of the growth and success of quota-preferential proportional representation (PR-STV)in Australia, particularly at the national level.

Catherine Helen Spence's 1861 booklet, A Plea for Pure Democracy, and her other writings and activism encouraged the 1895 formation of a proportional representation group called the 'Effective Voting League of South Australia'. (Spence was the first female candidate at a public election in the then British Empire when she stood unsuccessfully (under the quite unfair multiple vote) for election to the 1897 Australasian Federal Convention.)

A statue in Light Square in Adelaide, unveiled on 10 March 1986 by Queen Elizabeth II, commemorates Miss Spence. PRSA Inc. reprinted her 1861 booklet. Her memory is also preserved in her published autobiography and the novels she wrote. In some places, even outside Australia, PR-STV (and its single-winner version, instant-runoff voting) was referred to as Hare-Spence in honour of her work.

She was depicted on the Australian $5 banknote issued for the Centenary of Federation, in 2001.

PRSA Inc's SA members (in the Electoral Reform Society of South Australia) influenced the replacement of the only party-list system used, briefly, for Australian parliamentary elections, introduced by South Australia's Dunstan Labor Government in 1973, by direct election before the change to the present quota-preferential form of proportional representation (PR-STV) that the SA Electoral Act 1985 prescribes for elections for SA's Legislative Council. (The SA Constitution Act 1934 requires a referendum before either House can be abolished, but it does not specify or entrench the electoral system.)

== Advocacy ==
The Society advocates the use of Hare-Clark proportional voting, a form of the Single Transferable Vote method (PR-STV) currently in use for elections in Tasmania and the Australian Capital Territory.

It publishes a quarterly newsletter entitled Quota Notes.

The Society has also published educational documents and aids such as

- Rules for Counting Single Transferable Votes
- The Gerrymander Wheel, a simple calculator to demonstrate the perceived futility of drawing geographical boundaries in a single-member electorate system.

=== Issues ===
The Society has raised issues in relation to the conduct of public elections in Australia, which include:

- Robson Rotation, the need to randomly order candidates' listings in the printing of ballot papers so as to minimize the effect of donkey voting
- The rules for the calculation of the surplus transfer value in the distribution of preferences in proportional representation counts.
- Opposition to the Group Voting Ticket device still imposed on certain Australian proportional representation elections
- Filling casual vacancies by countback, which is a form of direct election, rather than by the party appointment system used to fill Senate and Legislative Council casual vacancies, except for Western Australia's Legislative Council.
- Electronic voting, and the introduction and use of computer technology in the conduct of elections

=== Submissions to Government ===
Proportional Representation Society of Australia Inc. has made submissions to governments that have influenced the development and formation of Australia's electoral systems.

=== Public discussion and forums ===
The Society holds and participates in public meetings and forums on electoral reform in various parts of Australia. There is a 2009 presentation by Malcolm Mackerras AO, an electoral analyst and political journalist.

== Vote-counting Service ==
PRSA Inc. also provides services in counting votes or fully conducting elections for corporate and community organizations in Australia including economical computations of results by email.

== Associations ==
The Society maintains a connection with:

- The Electoral Reform Society
- STV Action UK
- The Center for Voting and Democracy USA
- Fair Vote Canada
- Fair Voting British Columbia
