= First Gallagher ministry =

First Gallagher Ministry
- 11th Ministry of the Australian Capital Territory
- Date formed: 16 May 2011

People and organisations
- Chief Minister: Katy Gallagher
- Deputy Chief Minister: Andrew Barr
- No. of ministers: 5
- Member party: Labor
- Status in legislature: Minority government 7 / 17
- Opposition party: Liberal
- Opposition leader: Zed Seselja

History
- Legislature term: 7th
- Predecessor: Third Stanhope Ministry
- Successor: Second Gallagher Ministry

The First Gallagher Ministry was the 11th ministry of the Government of the Australian Capital Territory, and was led by Labor Chief Minister Katy Gallagher and her deputy Andrew Barr. It was initially appointed as a transitional ministry on 16 May 2011 following the resignation of Jon Stanhope as Chief Minister and the subsequent election of Katy Gallagher as his replacement by the Australian Capital Territory Legislative Assembly. Gallagher had stated that, once the 2011-12 ACT Budget was passed by the assembly, she would appoint her deputy Andrew Barr to the Treasury portfolio in her place. This was implemented on 1 July 2011.

The new ministry was the first step in aligning ministerial appointments with the new structure of the ACT public service as recommended by the Hawke Review and adopted by the government. To this end, a number of ministerial appointments from the final Stanhope ministry had been consolidated or removed in the new appointments.

The final Stanhope ministry contained five ministers including Stanhope. With Stanhope resigning his ministerial posts, the cabinet was reduced to four ministers. This was increased back to five ministers following the appointment of Chris Bourke to the ministry on 23 November 2011.

The ministry was replaced by the Second Gallagher Ministry after the Labor government's re-election at the 2012 election.

== First arrangement ==
Following Gallagher's election as Chief Minister, a new ministry of 4 ministers was appointed on 16 May 2011.

Office	Minister	Party affiliation
Chief Minister; Treasurer; Minister for Health; Minister for Industrial Relations	Katy Gallagher	Labor
Deputy Chief Minister; Minister for Economic Development; Minister for Education and Training; Minister for Tourism, Sport and Recreation	Andrew Barr	Labor
Attorney-General; Minister for the Environment and Sustainable Development; Minister for Territory and Municipal Services; Minister for Police and Emergency Services	Simon Corbell	Labor
Minister for Community Services; Minister for the Arts; Minister for Multicultural Affairs; Minister for Ageing; Minister for Women; Minister for Aboriginal and Torres Strait Islander Affairs	Joy Burch	Labor

=== Transfer of Treasury portfolio ===
On 1 July 2011, Deputy Chief Minister Andrew Barr was appointed as Treasurer, as announced by Gallagher in May 2011. There were no other changes to ministerial appointments.

== Second arrangement ==
On 23 November 2011, Chris Bourke was appointed to the Ministry, increasing the Ministry size back to 5. The arrangement lasted until 6 November 2012 when it was replaced by the Second Gallagher Ministry following the 2012 election.

Office	Minister	Party affiliation
Chief Minister; Minister for Health; Minister for Territory and Municipal Services	Katy Gallagher	Labor
Deputy Chief Minister; Treasurer; Minister for Economic Development; Minister for Tourism, Sport and Recreation	Andrew Barr	Labor
Attorney-General; Minister for Police and Emergency Services; Minister for the Environment and Sustainable Development	Simon Corbell	Labor
Minister for Community Services; Minister for the Arts; Minister for Multicultural Affairs; Minister for Ageing; Minister for Women; Minister for Gaming and Racing	Joy Burch	Labor
Minister for Education and Training; Minister for Aboriginal and Torres Strait Islander Affairs; Minister for Industrial Relations; Minister for Corrections	Chris Bourke	Labor

Preceded by Third Stanhope Ministry	First Gallagher Ministry; 2011-2012	Succeeded by Second Gallagher Ministry
