= Second Gallagher ministry =

Second Gallagher Ministry
- 12th Ministry of the Australian Capital Territory
- Date formed: 7 November 2012
- Date dissolved: 15 December 2014

People and organisations
- Chief Minister: Katy Gallagher
- Deputy Chief Minister: Andrew Barr
- No. of ministers: 6
- Member parties: Labor-Greens coalition
- Status in legislature: Coalition majority government 9/17
- Opposition party: Liberal
- Opposition leader: Jeremy Hanson

History
- Legislature term: 8th
- Predecessor: First Gallagher Ministry
- Successor: First Barr Ministry

The Second Gallagher Ministry was the 12th ministry of the Government of the Australian Capital Territory, and was led by Labor Chief Minister Katy Gallagher and her deputy Andrew Barr. It was appointed on 7 November 2012, following the 2012 general election held two weeks earlier.

The previous First Gallagher Ministry contained only members of the ACT Labor Party. In the 2012 general election, neither of the territory's two major parties (Labor and Liberals) had won sufficient number of seats to form government in their own right and would need the support of the sole Greens representative Shane Rattenbury. Rattenburry came to a formal parliamentary agreement with the Labor Party in order to form a coalition government, which meant that he would be appointed to the cabinet, and implement nearly 100 policies and reforms.

== First arrangement ==
Following the 2012 general election, the Greens-Labor agreement allowed Labor to retain government and guaranteed Shane Rattenbury's position in the Ministry. Gallagher appointed herself, her deputy Andrew Barr, Rattenbury and two other incumbent ministers into the Ministry without portfolio on 7 November 2012. Incumbent minister Chris Bourke was not reappointed to the Ministry.

Portfolios were allocated two days later on 9 November 2012. The arrangement lasted until 6 July 2014.

Portfolio	Minister	Party affiliation
Chief Minister; Minister for Regional Development; Minister for Health; Minister for Higher Education	Katy Gallagher MLA	Labor
Deputy Chief Minister; Treasurer; Minister for Economic Development; Minister for Sport and Recreation; Minister for Tourism and Events; Minister for Community Services	Andrew Barr MLA	Labor
Attorney-General; Minister for Police and Emergency Services; Minister for Workplace Safety and Industrial Relations; Minister for the Environment and Sustainable Development	Simon Corbell MLA	Labor
Minister for Education and Training; Minister for Disability, Children and Young People; Minister for the Arts; Minister for Women; Minister for Multicultural Affairs; Minister for Racing and Gaming	Joy Burch MLA	Labor
Minister for Territory and Municipal Services; Minister for Corrections; Minister for Housing; Minister for Aboriginal and Torres Strait Islander Affairs; Minister for Ageing	Shane Rattenbury MLA	Greens

== Second arrangement ==
On 7 July 2014, Mick Gentleman was appointed to the Ministry, increasing the Ministry size to 6. The arrangement lasted until Gallagher resigned as Chief Minister in December 2014, and her successor Andrew Barr formed the First Barr Ministry on 15 December 2014.

Portfolio	Minister	Party affiliation
Chief Minister; Minister for Health; Minister for Higher Education; Minister for Regional Development	Katy Gallagher MLA	Labor
Deputy Chief Minister; Treasurer; Minister for Economic Development; Minister for Housing; Minister for Tourism and Events	Andrew Barr MLA	Labor
Attorney-General; Minister for Police and Emergency Services; Minister for the Environment; Minister for Capital Metro	Simon Corbell MLA	Labor
Minister for Education and Training; Minister for Disability; Minister for Multicultural Affairs; Minister for Racing and Gaming; Minister for Women; Minister for the Arts	Joy Burch MLA	Labor
Minister for Territory and Municipal Services; Minister for Corrective Services; Minister for Aboriginal and Torres Strait Islander Affairs; Minister for Sport and Recreation	Shane Rattenbury MLA	Greens
Minister for Planning; Minister for Community Services; Minister for Workplace Safety and Industrial Relations; Minister for Children and Young People; Minister for Ageing	Mick Gentleman MLA	Labor

Preceded by First Gallagher Ministry	Second Gallagher Ministry; 2012-2014	Succeeded by First Barr Ministry
