= Third Stanhope ministry =

The Third Stanhope Ministry was the tenth ministry of the Government of the Australian Capital Territory and was led by Labor Chief Minister Jon Stanhope and his deputy Katy Gallagher. It was sworn in on 11 November 2008, following the Stanhope government's re-election for a third term in the 2008 election. It ended on 16 May 2011 with the appointment of the First Gallagher Ministry following the resignation of Jon Stanhope and subsequent election of Katy Gallagher as Chief Minister.

The new ministry saw no change in personnel from the previous ministry, but major changes to the portfolios of respective ministers. These included Jon Stanhope's assumption of responsibilities for territory and municipal services, including a new distinct transport ministry; Katy Gallagher taking the difficult corrections portfolio from Simon Corbell; Corbell taking the environment ministry from Stanhope and the police ministry from John Hargreaves, and Hargreaves taking the industrial relations portfolio from Andrew Barr.

== First arrangement ==
This covers the period from 11 November 2008 (when the Ministry was sworn in) until 9 November 2009.

Office	Minister	Party affiliation
Chief Minister; Minister for Transport; Minister for Territory and Municipal Services; Minister for Business and Economic Development; Minister for Indigenous Affairs; Minister for the Arts and Heritage	Jon Stanhope	Labor
Deputy Chief Minister; Treasurer; Minister for Health; Minister for Women	Katy Gallagher	Labor
Attorney-General; Minister for the Environment, Climate Change and Water; Minister for Energy; Minister for Police and Emergency Services	Simon Corbell	Labor
Minister for Disability and Housing; Minister for Ageing; Minister for Multicultural Affairs; Minister for Industrial Relations; Minister for Corrections	John Hargreaves	Labor
Minister for Education and Training; Minister for Children and Young People; Minister for Planning; Minister for Tourism, Sport and Recreation	Andrew Barr	Labor

== Second arrangement ==
The year-old government initiated a significant reshuffle of the ministry on 9 November 2009, coinciding with the resignation of John Hargreaves and the appointment of a replacement minister in Joy Burch. There was one minor change after this point, when, one month later, on 1 December 2009, an additional ministry for land and property services was added to Stanhope's responsibilities, and an additional ministry for children and young people was restored (held by Andrew Barr in the first arrangement) to Joy Burch.

Office	Minister	Party affiliation
Chief Minister; Minister for Transport; Minister for Territory and Municipal Services; Minister for Business and Economic Development; Minister for Land and Property Services (from 1 December 2009); Minister for Aboriginal and Torres Strait Islander Affairs; Minister for the Arts and Heritage	Jon Stanhope	Labor
Deputy Chief Minister; Treasurer; Minister for Health; Minister for Industrial Relations	Katy Gallagher	Labor
Attorney-General; Minister for the Environment, Climate Change and Water; Minister for Energy; Minister for Police and Emergency Services	Simon Corbell	Labor
Minister for Education and Training; Minister for Planning; Minister for Tourism, Sport and Recreation Minister for Gaming and Racing	Andrew Barr	Labor
Minister for Disability, Housing and Community Services; Minister for Children and Young People (from 1 December 2009); Minister for Ageing; Minister for Multicultural Affairs; Minister for Women	Joy Burch	Labor

Preceded by Second Stanhope Ministry	Third Stanhope Ministry; 2008–2011	Succeeded by First Gallagher Ministry
