= First Stanhope ministry =

The First Stanhope Ministry was the seventh ministry of the Government of the Australian Capital Territory, and was led by Labor Chief Minister Jon Stanhope and his deputy Ted Quinlan. It was sworn in on 13 November 2001 after the Labor victory at the 2001 election. It had only one remaining one member from the previous Labor ministry under Rosemary Follett in 1995, Bill Wood. It operated until 4 November 2004, when a new ministry was sworn in following Labor's re-election at the 2004 election.

== First arrangement ==
This covers the period from 13 November 2001 (when the Ministry was sworn in) until 23 December 2002. There was one change during this time, when, on 26 June 2002, Bill Wood was appointed to the new portfolio of Minister for Disability, Housing and Community Services.

Office	Minister	Party affiliation
Chief Minister; Attorney-General; Minister for Health; Minister for Community Affairs; Minister for Women	Jon Stanhope	Labor
Deputy Chief Minister; Treasurer; Minister for Economic Development, Business and Tourism; Minister for Sport, Racing and Gaming; Minister for Police, Emergency Services and Corrections	Ted Quinlan	Labor
Minister for Urban Services; Minister for the Arts; Minister for Disability, Housing and Community Services (from 26 June 2002)	Bill Wood	Labor
Minister for Education, Youth and Family Services; Minister for Planning; Minister for Industrial Relations	Simon Corbell	Labor

== Second arrangement ==
The year-old government initiated a significant reshuffle of the ministry 23 December 2002, coinciding with the appointment of a fifth minister in Katy Gallagher. There was one minor change after this point, when, on 26 May 2004, Gallagher's ministry for education, youth and family services was divided into separate responsibilities.

Office	Minister	Party affiliation
Chief Minister; Attorney-General; Minister for Environment; Minister for Community Affairs	Jon Stanhope	Labor
Deputy Chief Minister; Treasurer; Minister for Economic Development, Business and Tourism; Minister for Sport, Racing and Gaming	Ted Quinlan	Labor
Minister for Disability, Housing and Community Services; Minister for Urban Services; Minister for Police and Emergency Services; Minister for Arts and Heritage	Bill Wood	Labor
Minister for Health; Minister for Planning	Simon Corbell	Labor
Minister for Education, Youth and Family Services (until 26 May 2004); Minister for Women; Minister for Industrial Relations; Minister for Education and Training (from 26 May 2004); Minister for Children, Youth and Family Support (from 26 May 2004)	Katy Gallagher	Labor

Preceded by Humphries Ministry	First Stanhope Ministry; 2001-2004	Succeeded by Second Stanhope Ministry
