= Second Follett ministry =

The Second Follett Ministry was the third ministry of the Government of the Australian Capital Territory, and was led by Labor Chief Minister Rosemary Follett and her deputy, Wayne Berry. It was sworn in on 18 June 1991, after a successful resolution of no confidence in the Trevor Kaine led Liberal Party was passed in the Australian Capital Territory Legislative Assembly. Following the 1989 ACT general election, Labor, with a plurality of seats, led a minority government following the failure of an Alliance government between the Liberals and Residents Rally.

This ministry covers the period from 18 June 1991 (when the Ministry was sworn in) until the 1992 ACT general election. There was one minor change during this period when, on 20 December 1991, a new ministry for industrial relations was created with Berry as minister and the ministries of education and arts divided into separate ministries, with Woods remaining as minister.

Paul Whalan, Follett's Deputy in the First Follett Ministry resigned from the Assembly on 30 April 1990 and was replaced by Terry Connolly.

== First Arrangement ==
This arrangement lasted from 7 June 1991 to 18 June 1991.

| Office | Minister | Party affiliation |
|---|---|---|
| Chief Minister; Treasurer; Attorney-General; Minister for Housing and Community Services; Minister for Finance and Urban Services; Minister for Health, Education and the Arts | Rosemary Follett | Labor |

== Second Arrangement ==
This arrangement lasted from 18 June 1991 to 20 December 1991.

| Office | Minister | Party affiliation |
|---|---|---|
| Chief Minister; Treasurer | Rosemary Follett | Labor |
| Deputy Chief Minister; Minister for Health; Minister for Sport | Wayne Berry | Labor |
| Minister for Education and the Arts; Minister for the Environment, Land and Planning | Bill Wood | Labor |
| Attorney-General; Minister for Housing and Community Services; Minister for Urban Services | Terry Connolly | Labor |

== Third Arrangement ==
This arrangement lasted from 20 December 1991 to 6 April 1992.

| Office | Minister | Party affiliation |
|---|---|---|
| Chief Minister; Treasurer | Rosemary Follett | Labor |
| Deputy Chief Minister; Minister for Health; Minister for Industrial Relations; Minister for Sport | Wayne Berry | Labor |
| Minister for Education; Minister for the Arts; Minister for the Environment, Land and Planning | Bill Wood | Labor |
| Attorney-General; Minister for Housing and Community Services; Minister for Urban Services | Terry Connolly | Labor |

| Preceded by Kaine Ministry | Second Follett Ministry; 1991–1992 | Succeeded by Third Follett Ministry |
