= Second Carnell ministry =

The Second Carnell Ministry was the sixth ministry of the Government of the Australian Capital Territory, and was led by Liberal Chief Minister Kate Carnell and her deputy, Gary Humphries. It was sworn in on 31 March 1998, after the Carnell government's re-election for a second term at the 1998 election. The ministry operated until 9 October 2000, when Carnell resigned as chief minister after being informed by key independent members, Paul Osborne and Dave Rugendyke, that they would no longer support her leadership due to her handling of the Bruce Stadium affair. Deputy Chief Minister Humphries was sworn in as her replacement, and Carnell subsequently left politics.

The new ministry contained two major changes from the previous ministry: the second chief minister, Trevor Kaine (who subsequently quit the party), and a minister in the first Carnell Ministry were dumped in favour of Brendan Smyth, a member of the House of Representatives for the electorate of Canberra (from 1995 to 1996) and newly elected to the assembly, and the consolidation of most ministries into a series of larger portfolios.

On 31 March 1998, one month after the initial ministry was sworn in, veteran independent member, Michael Moore, was appointed minister. Moore continued to sit as an independent in the assembly, despite serving as health minister in the Carnell Liberal government; an appointment that increased the number of ministers to five.

A further change occurred on 7 August 1999, when Carnell divested the position of Treasurer to her deputy, Humphries, in response to mounting pressure due to her handling of the Bruce Stadium affair.

Ministerial Title	Minister	Party affiliation
Chief Minister; Treasurer (until 7 August 1999)	Kate Carnell	Liberal
Deputy Chief Minister; Treasurer (from 7 August 1999); Attorney-General; Minister for Justice and Community Safety; Minister for Health and Community Care (until 27 April 1998)	Gary Humphries	Liberal
Minister for Urban Services	Brendan Smyth	Liberal
Minister for Education	Bill Stefaniak	Liberal
Minister for Health and Community Care (from 27 April 1998)	Michael Moore	Independent

Preceded by First Carnell Ministry	Second Carnell Ministry; 1998-2000	Succeeded by Humphries Ministry
