= First Carnell ministry =

The First Carnell Ministry was the fifth ministry of the Government of the Australian Capital Territory, and was led by Liberal Chief Minister Kate Carnell and her three successive deputies, Tony De Domenico, Gary Humphries and Trevor Kaine. It was sworn in on 15 March 1995 after Carnell led the Liberal Party to its first ever election victory in the 1995 Australian Capital Territory election. (The party had previously held office in an Alliance with Residents Rally from 1989 to 1991, with Kaine as Chief Minister, brought about as the result of a successful no-confidence motion in the Follett Labor government.)

Having won office with a clear majority, Carnell appointed a full ministry comprising Liberal member. Fellow newcomer Tony De Domenico was sworn in as Carnell's deputy, along with Bill Stefaniak as education minister. Gary Humphries was the sole returning minister from the Kaine government, appointed Attorney-General; Kaine himself, a factional opponent of Carnell, was left on the backbenches.

The ministry saw one major change, when in January 1997, Deputy Chief Minister Tony De Domenico suddenly resigned from parliament in order to take up an offer of a position in the private sector. Humphries, who had the support of Carnell, was sworn in as an interim deputy on 9 January, but was defeated by Kaine for the permanent position after fierce lobbying from Kaine and his allies within the party. Kaine subsequently returned to the ministry, taking on De Domenico's former portfolios as well as a role Minister Assisting the Treasurer (who at the time was Carnell).

The ministry lasted until 31 March 1998, when the Second Carnell Ministry was sworn in after the Carnell government's re-election at the 1998 election.

== First arrangement ==
This covers the period from 15 March 1995 (when the Ministry was sworn in) until 31 January 1997 when a significant reshuffle occurred. There were two minor changes during this period. Firstly, when, on 28 June 1996, Tony De Domenico was appointed to the new portfolio of Minister for Regulatory Reform. There were two slight changes with merging of ministries covering police and emergency service for Humphries and education and training for Steganiak. The second changed occurred on 9 January 1997, when Gary Humphries assumed responsibility as Deputy Chief Minister following the sudden announcement by Domenico that he was taking up an offer of a position in the private sector.

Ministerial Title	Minister	Party affiliation
Chief Minister; Treasurer; Minister for Health and Community Care	Kate Carnell	Liberal
Deputy Chief Minister (until 9 January 1997); Minister for Urban Services; Minister for Industrial Relations; Minister for Business, Employment and Tourism; Minister for Regulatory Reform (from 28 June 1996)	Tony De Domenico	Liberal
Deputy Chief Minister (from 9 January 1997); Attorney-General; Minister for the Arts and Heritage; Minister for the Environment, Land and Planning; Minister for Police (until 28 June 1996); Minister for Emergency Services (until 28 June 1996); Minister for Consumer Affairs; Minister for Police and Emergency Services (from 28 June 1996)	Gary Humphries	Liberal
Minister for Education (until 28 June 1996); Minister for Education and Training (from 28 June 1996); Minister for Housing and Family Services; Minister for Sport and Recreation; Minister for Children's and Youth Services	Bill Stefaniak	Liberal

== Second arrangement ==
This covers the period from 31 January 1997 until 31 March 1998, when the Second Carnell Ministry was sworn in. During this period, the position of Deputy Chief Minister was hotly contested in a public factional battle between the opposing Carnell and Kaine factions. Humprhries was the Carnell faction candidate for Deputy Chief Minister. He was appointed initially by Carnell, on the resignation of De Domenico, but Kaine defeated Humphries in a party room vote. Carnell was forced to get Humprhries to stand aside for nearly three weeks until 17 February 1997, when they organised the factional numbers to roll Kaine. The only change in the ministry during this period was the position of Deputy Chief Minister.

Ministerial Title	Minister	Party affiliation
Chief Minister; Treasurer; Minister for Health and Community Care; Minister for Business and Employment	Kate Carnell	Liberal
Deputy Chief Minister (until 17 February 1997); Minister Assisting the Treasurer; Minister for Industrial Relations; Minister for Urban Services; Minister for Tourism; Minister for Regulatory Reform	Trevor Kaine	Liberal
Deputy Chief Minister (from 17 February 1997); Attorney-General; Minister for the Arts and Heritage; Minister for the Environment, Land and Planning; Minister for Fair Trading; Minister for Police and Emergency Services	Gary Humphries	Liberal
Minister for Education and Training; Minister for Housing and Family Services; Minister for Sport and Recreation; Minister for Children's and Youth Services	Bill Stefaniak	Liberal

Preceded by Third Follett Ministry	First Carnell Ministry; 1995-1998	Succeeded by Second Carnell Ministry
