= Second Stanhope ministry =

The Second Stanhope Ministry was the ninth ministry of the Government of the Australian Capital Territory, and was led by Labor Chief Minister Jon Stanhope and his deputies Ted Quinlan (2004–2006) and Katy Gallagher (2006–2008). It was sworn in on 4 November 2004, following the Labor government's landslide re-election at the 2004 election. The retirement of veteran member Bill Wood at the election created a vacancy in the ministry, and backbencher John Hargreaves, who had polled exceptionally well at the election, was appointed to fill the position.

There were several changes during the term of this ministry. The first, albeit minor, changes in March 2005 saw Deputy Chief Minister Quinlan pick up several new portfolios. A much greater change occurred in April 2006 when Quinlan's retirement from politics sparked a major reshuffle and the appointment of a new minister in Andrew Barr. A final change occurred in April 2007, when Simon Corbell was stripped of his responsibilities for planning after publicly criticising Chief Minister Stanhope over his handling of the area, and Stanhope chose to reactivate an environment and climate change ministry.

The ministry was replaced by the Third Stanhope Ministry after the Labor government's re-election at the 2008 election.

== First arrangement ==
This covers from the period from 4 November 2004 (when the ministry was sworn in) until 20 April 2006. There was one minor change during this term when, six months later on 2 March 2005, additional ministries were added to Quinlan's responsibilities, covering the ministries of business, tourism, sport and recreation and racing and gaming. This arrangement continued until the retirement of Ted Quinlan that resulted in a major reshuffle of the ministry, and the appointment of Andrew Barr to fill the subsequent vacancy, as outlined in the second arrangement.

Office	Minister	Party affiliation
Chief Minister; Attorney-General; Minister for Environment; Minister for Arts, Heritage and Indigenous Affairs	Jon Stanhope	Labor
Deputy Chief Minister; Treasurer; Minister for Economic Development (until 2 March 2005); Minister for Economic Development and Business (from 2 March 2005); Minister for Tourism (from 2 March 2005); Minister for Sport and Recreation (from 2 March 2005); Minister for Racing and Gaming (from 2 March 2005)	Ted Quinlan	Labor
Minister for Health; Minister for Planning	Simon Corbell	Labor
Minister for Education and Training; Minister for Children, Youth and Family Support; Minister for Women; Minister for Industrial Relations	Katy Gallagher	Labor
Minister for Disability, Housing and Community Services; Minister for Urban Services; Minister for Police and Emergency Services	John Hargreaves	Labor

== Second arrangement ==
This covers the period from 20 April 2006, when Andrew Barr was sworn in following the retirement of Ted Quinlan, through until the swearing in of the Third Stanhope Ministry following the Labor government's re-election at the 2008 election. There was one minor change during this term when, twelve months later on 17 April 2007, Stanhope assumed the expanded ministry of environment, water and climate change; the ministry for children and young people was restored to Gallagher's responsibilities; and the planning ministry transferred from Corbell to Barr.

Office	Minister	Party affiliation
Chief Minister; Treasurer; Minister for Business and Economic Development; Minister for Indigenous Affairs; Minister for the Arts; Minister for the Environment, Water and Climate Change (from 17 April 2007)	Jon Stanhope	Labor
Deputy Chief Minister; Minister for Health; Minister for Disability and Community Services; Minister for Women; Minister for Children and Young People (from 17 April 2007)	Katy Gallagher	Labor
Attorney-General; Minister for Police and Emergency Services; Minister for Planning (until 17 April 2007)	Simon Corbell	Labor
Minister for Territory and Municipal Services; Minister for Housing; Minister for Multicultural Affairs	John Hargreaves	Labor
Minister for Education and Training; Minister for Tourism, Sport and Recreation; Minister for Industrial Relations; Minister for Planning (from 17 April 2007)	Andrew Barr	Labor

Preceded by First Stanhope Ministry	Second Stanhope Ministry; 2004-2008	Succeeded by Third Stanhope Ministry
