= Minister for Transport (Australian Capital Territory) =

Minister for Transport of the Australian Capital Territory
- Coat of arms of the Australian Capital Territory
- Incumbent; Chris Steel since 1 July 2019
- City and Environment Directorate
- Member of: Legislative Assembly; Cabinet
- Seat: 1 Constitution Avenue, Canberra
- Nominator: Chief Minister
- Formation: 16 May 1989
- First holder: Ellnor Grassby (as Minister for Housing and Urban Services)
- Website: Transport Canberra

The Minister for Transport (Australian Capital Territory) is the title held by the Cabinet minister who is responsible for the management of the ACT Government's public transport network, including ACTION bus services, light rail services and public transport infrastructure.

The current minister is Chris Steel of the Labor Party, who was appointed to the portfolio by Chief Minister Andrew Barr on 1 July 2019.

Historically, the transport portfolio has formed part of the municipal or city services portfolios. Upon the establishment of self-government in 1989, it was originally known as the Minister for Housing and Urban Services. For much of the 1990s and early 2000s, the role was titled Minister for Urban Services, later transitioning to Minister for Territory and Municipal Services under the Stanhope and Gallagher ministries. Since 2018, the portfolio has generally been known as Minister for Transport with responsibility for public transport services and infrastructure.

== List of ministers ==
The following individuals have served as the minister responsible for transport in the Australian Capital Territory. The exact title of the portfolio has fluctuated and has additional responsibilities attached to it.

No.	Minister	Party	Portfolio title	Assumed office	Left office	Term length
1	Ellnor Grassby	Labor	Minister for Housing and Urban Services	16 May 1989	5 December 1989	203 days
2	Trevor Kaine	Liberal	Minister for Housing and Urban Services	5 December 1989	13 December 1989	8 days
3	Craig Duby	Independents Group	Minister for Finance and Urban Services	13 December 1989	6 June 1991	1 year, 175 days
4	Terry Connolly	Labor	Minister for Urban Services	18 June 1991	13 April 1994	2 years, 299 days
5	David Lamont	Labor	Minister for Urban Services	13 April 1994	15 March 1995	336 days
6	Tony De Domenico	Liberal	Minister for Urban Services	15 March 1995	9 January 1997	1 year, 300 days
(2)	Trevor Kaine	Liberal	Minister for Urban Services	9 January 1997	31 March 1998	1 year, 81 days
7	Brendan Smyth	Liberal	Minister for Urban Services	31 March 1998	13 November 2001	3 years, 227 days
8	Bill Wood	Labor	Minister for Urban Services	13 November 2001	4 November 2004	2 years, 357 days
9	John Hargreaves	Labor	Minister for Urban Services	4 November 2004	20 April 2006	4 years, 7 days
9	John Hargreaves	Labor	Minister for Territory and Municipal Services	20 April 2006	11 November 2008	4 years, 7 days
10	Jon Stanhope	Labor	Minister for Transport; Minister for Territory and Municipal Services	11 November 2008	16 May 2011	2 years, 186 days
11	Simon Corbell	Labor	Minister for Territory and Municipal Services	16 May 2011	7 November 2012	1 year, 175 days
12	Shane Rattenbury	Greens	Minister for Territory and Municipal Services	7 November 2012	22 January 2016	3 years, 76 days
13	Meegan Fitzharris	Labor	Minister for Transport and Municipal Services	22 January 2016	1 July 2016	3 years, 160 days
13	Meegan Fitzharris	Labor	Minister for Transport and City Services	1 July 2016	24 August 2018	3 years, 160 days
13	Meegan Fitzharris	Labor	Minister for Transport	24 August 2018	1 July 2019	3 years, 160 days
14	Chris Steel	Labor	Minister for Transport	1 July 2019	4 November 2020	7 years, 68 days
14	Chris Steel	Labor	Minister for Transport and City Services	4 November 2020	11 December 2023	7 years, 68 days
14	Chris Steel	Labor	Minister for Transport	11 December 2023	Incumbent	7 years, 68 days

== See also ==
- Government of the Australian Capital Territory
- Transport Canberra & City Services
- Canberra light rail
