= Humphries ministry =

The Humphries Ministry was the seventh ministry of the Government of the Australian Capital Territory, and was led by Liberal Chief Minister Gary Humphries and his deputy, Brendan Smyth. It was sworn in on 19 October 2000, after the forced resignation of Humphries' predecessor Kate Carnell over the Bruce Stadium affair, and the elevation of Deputy Chief Minister Humphries and new deputy Smyth.

Though Carnell resigned from parliament upon losing the Chief Minister position, she was initially sworn into an interim junior portfolio in the ministry of her successor, until a full ministry could be sworn in during December. The ministry operated until 13 November 2001, when the Labor First Stanhope Ministry was sworn in after the Liberal defeat in the 2001 election.

== First arrangement ==
This covers the period from 19 October 2000 (when the Ministry was sworn in) until the reshuffle on 15 December forced by the resignation from politics of Kate Carnell. Carnell had technically continued to hold a number of minor ministerial portfolios after her resignation as Chief Minister, despite her also resigning from parliament at the same time.

Office	Minister	Party affiliation
Chief Minister; Minister for Community Affairs; Attorney-General; Treasurer	Gary Humphries	Liberal
Deputy Chief Minister; Minister for Urban Services	Brendan Smyth	Liberal
Minister for Health, Housing and Community Care	Michael Moore	Independent
Minister for Education; Minister Assisting the Attorney-General	Bill Stefaniak	Liberal
Minister for Business, Tourism and the Arts	Kate Carnell	Liberal

== Second arrangement ==
This covers the period from 15 December 2000, until the until 13 November 2001 and was brought about following the resignation from the Assembly from the earlier deposed former Chief Minister Carnell. Carnell was not replaced in the ministry, and Humphries decided to continue to the election with only four ministers after distributing Carnell's portfolios among the remaining members. The reporting of Moore in the list of ministers, in terms of hierarchy, shifted to the bottom of the ministerial list.

Office	Minister	Party affiliation
Chief Minister; Minister for Community Affairs; Treasurer	Gary Humphries	Liberal
Deputy Chief Minister; Minister for Urban Services; Minister for Business, Tourism and the Arts; Minister for Police and Emergency Services	Brendan Smyth	Liberal
Minister for Education; Attorney-General	Bill Stefaniak	Liberal
Minister for Health, Housing and Community Services	Michael Moore	Independent

Preceded by Second Carnell Ministry	Humphries Ministry; 2000-2001	Succeeded by First Stanhope Ministry
