= Kaine ministry =

The Kaine Ministry was the second ministry of the Government of the Australian Capital Territory, and was a coalition led by Liberal Chief Minister Trevor Kaine and his deputy, Residents Rally party leader Bernard Collaery. It was sworn in on 5 December 1989, when Collaery moved the following motion:

That this Assembly no longer has confidence in the Chief Minister of the ACT and the minority Labor Government and has confidence in the ability of Mr Kaine to form a government.

The vote was resolved in the affirmative (10 votes to 7), and the Follett led Labor government was forced to hand over government to Kaine as leader of an Alliance Government, comprising members of both the Liberal Party and some (but not all) members of the Residents Rally in the Assembly.

This ministry covers the period from 5 December 1989 until 6 June 1991, when Kaine himself lost a no confidence vote in the Assembly following unpopular decisions to close schools, close the Royal Canberra Hospital and amend planning laws that led to the collapse of the Kaine led Liberal Alliance Government with Residents Rally. Follett moved the following motion:

That this Assembly has no confidence in the Chief Minister, Mr Kaine, and his minority Government.

The vote was resolved in affirmative (9 votes to 7, with one abstention), and the Follett led Labor Party resumed government.

== First arrangement ==
This covers the period from 5 December 1989, when Kaine assumed all ministerial responsibilities, until 13 December 1989, when ministerial responsibilities were determined with the Alliance government. During this period of eight days, there was no Deputy Chief Minister.

Office	Minister	Party affiliation
Chief Minister; Treasurer; Attorney-General; Minister for Industry, Employment and Education; Minister for Community Services and Health; Minister for Housing and Urban Services	Trevor Kaine	Liberal

== Second arrangement ==
This covers the period from 13 December 1989, when Kaine distributed ministerial responsibilities in the Alliance government, until 29 May 1991, when Kaine announced to the Assembly that members of Residents Rally had met the previous evening and decided to dissolve the Alliance, due to an internal split in the Rally party, where two of the four members chose to align themselves with the Kaine government. The remaining two members chose to not align themselves with the Kaine government. Collaery stood down as Attorney-General and as Deputy Chief Minister.

Office	Minister	Party affiliation
Chief Minister; Treasurer	Trevor Kaine	Liberal
Deputy Chief Minister; Attorney-General; Minister for Housing and Community Services	Bernard Collaery	Residents Rally
Minister for Finance and Urban Services	Craig Duby	Independents Group
Minister for Health, Education and the Arts	Gary Humphries	Liberal

== Third arrangement ==
This covers the period from 29 May 1991, when Collaery stood down as Deputy Chief Minister and Attorney-General and ministerial responsibilities were shared across Kaine, Duby and Humphries, until 6 June 1991, when a motion of no confidence in Kaine, as Chief Minister, was passed. The arrangement ended on 7 June 1991. During this period, there was no Deputy Chief Minister.

Office	Minister	Party affiliation
Chief Minister; Treasurer; Attorney-General	Trevor Kaine	Liberal
Minister for Housing and Community Services; Minister for Finance and Urban Services	Craig Duby	Independents Group
Minister for Health, Education and the Arts	Gary Humphries	Liberal

Preceded by First Follett Ministry	Kaine Ministry; 1989–1991	Succeeded by Second Follett Ministry
