= Environment, Planning and Sustainable Development Directorate =

Agency of an Australian territory government

Directorate overview
- Formed: 17 May 2011
- Preceding agencies: Department of Environment, Climate Change, Energy and Water (DECCEW); ACT Planning and Land Authority (ACTPLA)
- Jurisdiction: Australian Capital Territory
- Headquarters: 16 Challis Street, Dickson
- Ministers responsible: Mick Gentleman, Minister for the Environment and Heritage, Minister for Planning and Land Management; Shane Rattenbury, Minister for Climate Change and Sustainability
- Directorate executive: Ben Ponton, Director-General
- Child agencies: ACT Conservator of Flora and Fauna; ACT Heritage Council; ACT Parks and Conservation Service (PCS)
- Key document: Administrative Arrangements 2018 (No. 2) NI2018-523
- Website: https://www.environment.act.gov.au (Environment) https://www.planning.act.gov.au/home (Planning)

The Environment, Planning and Sustainable Development Directorate (EPSDD) is a directorate of the Australian Capital Territory government. It was formed from the merger of the Department of Environment, Climate Change, Energy and Water (DECCEW) and the ACT Planning and Land Authority (ACTPLA) on 17 May 2011, after Katy Gallagher was elected by the Legislative Assembly as Chief Minister the day before.

== History ==
The directorate was formed on 17 May 2011 as the Environment and Sustainable Development Directorate (ESDD), replacing and taking over:

- Department of Environment, Climate Change, Energy and Water (DECCEW)
- ACT Planning and Land Authority (ACTPLA)
- transport and conservation planning functions from the Department of Territory and Municipal Services (now Transport Canberra and City Services Directorate)
- heritage functions and the ACT Government Architect from the Chief Minister's Department (now Chief Minister, Treasury and Economic Development Directorate)

The directorate was later renamed Environment and Planning Directorate (EPD) before it was finally renamed to its current name in late 2016.

== Structure ==
The directorate is responsible for developing and implementing a wide range of policies and programs across city planning and development, climate change and the environment. As of September 2019, it reports to a number of ministers:

- Minister for Housing and Suburban Development, currently Yvette Berry
- Minister for Employment and Workplace Safety, currently Suzanne Orr
- Minister for the Environment and Heritage, currently Mick Gentleman
- Minister for Climate Change and Sustainability, currently Shane Rattenbury
- Minister for Building Quality Improvement, currently Gordon Ramsay
- Minister for Planning and Land Management, currently Mick Gentleman
- Minister for Urban Renewal, currently Rachel Stephen-Smith.

As of September 2019, the Director-General is Ben Ponton.

=== Activities ===
==== Former ACT Planning and Land Authority ====
Under the Planning and Development Act 2007, the former ACTPLA was required to:

- administer the Territory Plan;
- continually assess the Territory Plan and propose amendments as necessary;
- plan and regulate the development of land;
- advise on planning and land policy, including the broad spatial planning framework for the ACT;
- implement sustainable transport planning;
- maintain the digital cadastral database;
- make available land information;
- grant, administer, vary and end leases on behalf of the Executive;
- grant licenses over unleased Territory land;
- decide applications for approval to undertake development;
- regulate the building industry;
- make orders under the ACT Land (Planning and Environment) Act 1991, part 6 (approvals and orders);
- provide planning services, including services to entities outside the ACT;
- review its own decisions;
- provide administrative support and facilities for the Planning and Land Council;
- ensure community consultation and participation in planning decisions; and
- promote public education and understanding of the planning process, including by providing easily accessible public information and documentation on planning and land use.

The Authority stated that it performed its functions independently, free from day-to-day political influences. However, in practice under the then Minister for Planning, Simon Corbell, the Authority often followed direct instruction from the Minister.
