= Third Follett ministry =

About

The Third Follett Ministry was the fourth ministry of the Government of the Australian Capital Territory and was led by Labor Chief Minister Rosemary Follett and her deputy, Wayne Berry. It was sworn in on 6 April 1992 following the incumbent Labor minority government winning a plurality of seats in the Australian Capital Territory Legislative Assembly at the 1992 election.

== First arrangement ==
This covers the period from 6 April 1992 (when the Ministry was sworn in) until 13 April 1994 when Wayne Berry stood down as Deputy Chief Mnisiter and was replaced by David Lamont.

Office	Minister	Party affiliation
Chief Minister; Treasurer	Rosemary Follett	Labor
Deputy Chief Minister; Minister for Health; Minister for Industrial Relations; Minister for Sport	Wayne Berry	Labor
Minister for Education and Training; Minister for the Arts; Minister for the Environment, Land and Planning	Bill Wood	Labor
Attorney-General; Minister for Housing and Community Services; Minister for Urban Services	Terry Connolly	Labor

== Second arrangement ==
This covers the period from 13 April 1994 to 20 May 1994.

Office	Minister	Party affiliation
Chief Minister; Treasurer	Rosemary Follett	Labor
Deputy Chief Minister; Minister for Housing and Community Services; Minister for Urban Services; Minister for Industrial Relations; Minister for Sport	David Lamont	Labor
Minister for Education and Training; Minister for the Arts; Minister for the Environment, Land and Planning	Bill Wood	Labor
Attorney-General; Minister for Health	Terry Connolly	Labor

== Third arrangement ==
This covers the period from 20 May 1994 to 15 March 1995.

Office	Minister	Party affiliation
Chief Minister; Treasurer	Rosemary Follett	Labor
Deputy Chief Minister; Minister for Housing and Community Services; Minister for Urban Services; Minister for Industrial Relations; Minister for Sport	David Lamont	Labor
Minister for Education and Training; Minister for the Arts and Heritage; Minister for the Environment, Land and Planning	Bill Wood	Labor
Attorney-General; Minister for Health	Terry Connolly	Labor

Preceded by Second Follett Ministry	Third Follett Ministry; 1992-1995	Succeeded by First Carnell Ministry
