= Stanhope ministry =

Stanhope ministry may refer to:

- First Stanhope–Sunderland ministry, the British government under Lord Stanhope and Lord Sunderland (1717–1718)
- Second Stanhope–Sunderland ministry, the British government under Lord Stanhope and Lord Sunderland (1718–1721)
- First Stanhope ministry, the Australian Capital Territory government under Jon Stanhope (2001–2004)
- Second Stanhope ministry, the Australian Capital Territory government under Jon Stanhope (2004–2008)
- Third Stanhope ministry, the Australian Capital Territory government under Jon Stanhope (2008–2011)
