= Chief Minister, Treasury and Economic Development Directorate =

Directorate overview
- Formed: 7 July 2014
- Preceding agencies: Chief Minister and Cabinet Directorate (CMCD); Treasury Directorate; Economic Development Directorate (EDD)
- Jurisdiction: Australian Capital Territory
- Headquarters: 3 Constitution Ave, Canberra
- Minister responsible: Andrew Barr, Chief Minister, Treasurer, Minister for Climate Action, Economic Development, Tourism
- Directorate executives: Kathy Leigh, Head of Service and Director-General; David Nicol, Under Treasurer
- Key document: Administrative Arrangements 2020 (No. 2) NI2020-707
- Website: https://www.cmtedd.act.gov.au/

The Chief Minister, Treasury and Economic Development Directorate (CMTEDD) is a directorate of the Australian Capital Territory government, which advises the ACT Chief Minister, currently Andrew Barr.

== History ==
The directorate originated from a few defunct separate directorates, mainly the Chief Minister and Cabinet Directorate (CMCD), Treasury Directorate and the Economic Development Directorate (EDD). These directorates were created on 17 May 2011 after Katy Gallagher was elected by the Legislative Assembly as Chief Minister the day before.

=== The original directorates ===
==== Chief Minister and Cabinet Directorate ====
Prior to May 2011, the Chief Minister and Cabinet Directorate (CMCD) was previously known as the Chief Minister's Department. At the time, the department provided leadership and advice to all ACT government departments for the planning, development, co-ordination and implementation of key government policies and strategies.

The administrative arrangements in May 2011 resulted in:

- renaming of Chief Minister’s Department to the Chief Minister and Cabinet Directorate (CMCD)
- transferring Business and Industry Development, Australian Capital Tourism, Live in Canberra and Special Events to the Economic Development Directorate (EDD)
- transferring Heritage and the Government Architect to the Environment and Sustainable Development Directorate (ESDD)
- transferring artsACT to the Community Services Directorate
- renaming of the Governance Division to the People and Performance Division

The People and Performance Division was further renamed Workforce Capability and Governance Division on 22 July 2011.

==== Treasury Directorate ====
The Treasury Directorate was renamed from the Department of Treasury on 17 May 2011. It was headed by the Treasurer, and provided strategic financial and economic advice and services to the ACT Government with the aim of improving the Territory’s financial position and economic management.

==== Economic Development Directorate ====
The Economic Development Directorate was a brand new directorate formed on 17 May 2011, bringing together elements of ACT Government operations (ACT Public Service) that have a focus on economic activity which included working with the business community in relation to economic development and business support programs, the design and delivery of the government's land release program, tourism and events and sport and recreation.

=== Mergers ===
On 10 November 2012, the Treasury Directorate along with its Finance and Budget and Investment division and Economics division were merged into the CMCD, which was renamed Chief Minister and Treasury Directorate (CMTD). This started the history of the Chief Minister and Treasury streams within the directorate.

On 7 July 2014, further administrative arrangements resulted in:

- formation of Chief Minister, Treasury and Economic Development Directorate (CMTEDD) from the merger of the CMTD, the Commerce and Works Directorate and the Economic Development Directorate (EDD)
- artsACT, community concessions and community facilities were transferred from the Community Services Directorate into the CMTEDD
- ACT Property Group was transferred from the Territory and Municipal Services Directorate (TAMS) into the CMTEDD

== Structure ==
The directorate is split into two streams, with following divisions and functions:

- Chief Minister stream
  - Office of the Head of Service
  - Policy and Cabinet
  - Chief Financial Officer
  - Communications and Engagement
  - Economic Development
  - Workforce Capability and Governance
  - Access Canberra
  - Corporate
  - Chief Digital Officer
- Treasury stream
  - Economic, Budget and Industrial Relations
    - Finance and Budget
    - Revenue Management
    - Workplace Safety and industrial Relations
    - Economic and Financial
  - Commercial Services and Infrastructure
    - Shared Services
    - Procurement ACT
    - Property and Venues
    - ACT Insurance Authority (ACTIA)

As of 7 December 2020, the Chief Minister stream is headed by the Head of service and Director-General, Kathy Leigh, while the Treasury stream is headed by the Under Treasurer, David Nicol.

The two streams report to the following ministers:

- ACT Chief Minister, currently Andrew Barr
- Treasurer, currently Andrew Barr
- Minister for Climate Action, currently Andrew Barr
- Minister for Economic Development, currently Andrew Barr
- Minister for Tourism, currently Andrew Barr
- Minister for Sport and Recreation, currently Yvette Berry
- Minister for Industrial Relations and Workplace Safety, currently Mick Gentleman
- Minister for Skills, currently Chris Steel
- Special Minister of State, currently Chris Steel
- Assistant Minister for Economic Development, currently Tara Cheyne
- Minister for the Arts, currently Tara Cheyne
- Minister for Business and Better Regulation, currently Tara Cheyne
