= Members of the Australian Capital Territory Legislative Assembly, 2012–2016 =

Members of the Australian Capital Territory Legislative Assembly, 2012–2016

This is a list of members of the eighth Australian Capital Territory Legislative Assembly, as elected at and subsequent to the October 2012 election.

Name	Party	Electorate	Term in office
Andrew Barr	ALP	Molonglo	2006–present
Yvette Berry	ALP	Ginninderra	2012–present
Chris Bourke	ALP	Ginninderra	2011–2016
Joy Burch	ALP	Brindabella	2008–2024
Alistair Coe	Liberal	Ginninderra	2008–2021
Simon Corbell	ALP	Molonglo	1996–2016
Steve Doszpot	Liberal	Molonglo	2008–2017
Vicki Dunne	Liberal	Ginninderra	2001–2020
Meegan Fitzharris ^{[2]}	ALP	Molonglo	2015–2019
Katy Gallagher ^{[2]}	ALP	Molonglo	2001–2014
Mick Gentleman	ALP	Brindabella	2004–2008, 2012–2024
Jeremy Hanson	Liberal	Molonglo	2008–present
Jayson Hinder ^{[3]}	ALP	Ginninderra	2016
Val Jeffery ^{[4]}	Liberal	Brindabella	2016
Giulia Jones	Liberal	Molonglo	2012–2022
Nicole Lawder ^{[1]}	Liberal	Brindabella	2013–2024
Mary Porter ^{[3]}	ALP	Ginninderra	2004–2016
Shane Rattenbury	Green	Molonglo	2008–present
Zed Seselja ^{[1]}	Liberal	Brindabella	2004–2013
Brendan Smyth ^{[4]}	Liberal	Brindabella	1998–2016
Andrew Wall	Liberal	Brindabella	2012–2020

== See also ==
- 2012 Australian Capital Territory election

== Notes ==
^{1} Brindabella Liberal MLA Zed Seselja resigned on 11 June 2013 to contest a Senate seat at the 2013 federal election. Nicole Lawder was elected to the casual vacancy in a countback on 24 June.
^{2} Molonglo Labor MLA Katy Gallagher resigned on 23 December 2014 after announcing her intention to contest Labor preselection for a Senate vacancy. Meegan Fitzharris was elected to the casual vacancy in a countback on 15 January 2015.
^{3} Ginninderra Labor MLA Mary Porter resigned on 19 February 2016 for health reasons. Jayson Hinder was elected to the casual vacancy in a countback on 3 March 2016.
^{4} Brindabella Liberal MLA Brendan Smyth resigned on 15 July 2016 to take up the role of Commissioner for International Engagement for the ACT. Val Jeffery was elected to the casual vacancy in a countback on 28 July 2016.
