= First Follett ministry =

The First Follett Ministry was the first ministry of the Government of the Australian Capital Territory, and was led by Labor Chief Minister Rosemary Follett and her deputy, Paul Whalan. It was sworn in on 16 May 1989, after the 1989 election when a hung parliament was the outcome. Labor, with a plurality of seats, led a minority government in the Australian Capital Territory Legislative Assembly.

This ministry covers the period from 16 May 1989 (when the Ministry was sworn in) until on 5 December 1989, when Bernard Collaery, the leader of Residents Rally, a minor party in the Assembly, moved the following motion

That this Assembly no longer has confidence in the Chief Minister of the ACT and the minority Labor Government and has confidence in the ability of Mr Kaine to form a government.

The vote was resolved in affirmative (10 to 7 votes), and Trevor Kaine elected Chief Minister as leader of an Alliance Government, comprising members of both the Liberal Party and some (but not all) members of the Residents Rally in the Assembly and the Kaine Ministry formed.

== Arrangement ==
This arrangement lasted from 16 May 1989 to 5 December 1989.

Office	Minister	Party affiliation
Chief Minister; Treasurer; Attorney-General	Rosemary Follett	Labor
Deputy Chief Minister; Minister for Industry, Employment and Education	Paul Whalan	Labor
Minister for Community Services and Health	Wayne Berry	Labor
Minister for Housing and Urban Services	Ellnor Grassby	Labor

Preceded by	First Follett Ministry; 1989	Succeeded by Kaine Ministry
