= Marguerite McKinnon =

Australian journalist

Marguerite McKinnon (born July 1970), is an Australian journalist and television reporter for Seven News in Sydney, New South Wales, Australia.

== Personal life ==
Born at the Mater Hospital in North Sydney, McKinnon was the sixth child to Eric and Rosemary McKinnon, she has four brothers and three sisters. Eric McKinnon, a Korean War veteran, was also a teacher at several schools including St Paul's College, Manly where he taught ceramics. Rosemary McKinnon, a former flight attendant for Qantas prior to her marriage to Eric, has a degree in Rehabilitation Counseling from University of Sydney.

McKinnon, is a Catholic, and along with her brothers and sisters, she attended St Kieran's School in Manly Vale for primary education, and Stella Maris College, Manly for secondary education. In Year 12 (senior year) McKinnon was named School Captain. McKinnon completed a BA Communications degree at Charles Sturt University. Mitchell campus, in Bathurst,

== Career ==
McKinnon began her career at Network Ten in Sydney, she then became a snow reporter at the ski resort Thredbo. She also worked at Radio 2XL in Cooma, Radio FM 104.7 Canberra, WIN Television in Orange and Canberra and in Radio 2UE's Federal Parliament bureau, before moving to Channel Seven Sydney where she worked as a news journalist for five years. She currently works for Channel Seven's current affairs program Today Tonight. McKinnon is also a columnist for small business publication, NETT# Magazine.

She is an ambassador for Life Changing Experiences mentoring program, member of the Cancer Council, and a regular blood, platelets and plasma donor.

When McKinnon left her reporting position for WIN in 2002, covering the Australian Capital Territory Legislative Assembly (to move to 2UE), MLA Labor Party member John Hargreaves lamented her departure:

"Mr Speaker, I will be brief. I just want to make sure the record shows that this Assembly appreciates the services of Marguerite McKinnon. Marguerite has had heaps of years with WIN. She was dogged, fair and entertaining. She gave us a tough time and a good time, and she added an enormous amount to the quality of media representation in this place. It will be sad to see her go.

We wish Marguerite very well when she goes to 2UE. I would like the record to show that every member in this chamber will miss her smiling face at the camera."

McKinnon received a police citation for bravery in 2003, for trying to help save two men trapped in a burning car. Sadly both died.

In 2007 she helped rescue a drowning American tourist, from Boston, caught in a rip current in the waters of Manly Beach.

McKinnon resigned from Channel Seven in June 2009 – prior to getting married and moving to the country. Marguerite continued her journalism in a senior role with WIN Television and is now a freelance writer for several business and lifestyle magazines.
