= Members of the Australian Capital Territory Legislative Assembly =

Following are lists of members of the Australian Capital Territory Legislative Assembly:

- Members of the Australian Capital Territory Legislative Assembly, 1989–1991
- Members of the Australian Capital Territory Legislative Assembly, 1992–1995
- Members of the Australian Capital Territory Legislative Assembly, 1995–1998
- Members of the Australian Capital Territory Legislative Assembly, 1998–2001
- Members of the Australian Capital Territory Legislative Assembly, 2001–2004
- Members of the Australian Capital Territory Legislative Assembly, 2004–2008
- Members of the Australian Capital Territory Legislative Assembly, 2008–2012
- Members of the Australian Capital Territory Legislative Assembly, 2012–2016
- Members of the Australian Capital Territory Legislative Assembly, 2016–2020
- Members of the Australian Capital Territory Legislative Assembly, 2020–2024
- Members of the Australian Capital Territory Legislative Assembly, 2024–2028
