= Members of the Australian Capital Territory Legislative Assembly, 1992–1995 =

Members of the Australian Capital Territory Legislative Assembly, 1992–1995

This is a list of the members of the second parliament of the Australian Capital Territory Legislative Assembly, which operated from 1992 to 1995. It was the last to be elected under the one-electorate modified D'Hondt method, before the Territory was divided up into three electorates, as it would remain until 2016.

Name	Party	Term in office
Wayne Berry	ALP	1989–2008
Kate Carnell	Liberal	1992–2000
Terry Connolly	ALP	1990–1996
Greg Cornwell	Liberal	1992–2004
Tony De Domenico	Liberal	1992–1997
Annette Ellis	ALP	1992–1995
Rosemary Follett	ALP	1989–1996
Ellnor Grassby	ALP	1989–1995
Gary Humphries	Liberal	1989–2002
Trevor Kaine	Liberal	1989–2001
David Lamont	ALP	1992–1995
Roberta McRae	ALP	1992–1998
Michael Moore	Moore Independents Group	1989–2001
Bill Stefaniak^{[2]}	Liberal	1989–1992, 1994–2008
Dennis Stevenson	Abolish Self-Government Coalition	1989–1995
Helen Szuty	Moore Independents Group^{[1]}	1992–1995
Lou Westende^{[2]}	Liberal	1992–1994
Bill Wood	ALP	1989–2004

^{1} Helen Szuty was elected on the Moore Independents Group ticket, but sat in the Assembly as an independent.
^{2} Liberal member Lou Westende resigned on 25 July 1994. The vacancy was filled by Liberal Bill Stefaniak.

== See also ==
- 1992 Australian Capital Territory election
