= David Lamont =

Australian politician

Colin David Lamont (born 24 August 1953) is an Australian politician and was a member of the second Australian Capital Territory Legislative Assembly, elected to the multi-member single constituency Assembly for the Labor Party in 1992. Lamont was a senior minister in the Third Follett Ministry; and held the following titles: Deputy Chief Minister, Minister for Housing and Community Services, Minister for Urban Services, Minister for Industrial Relations, and Minister for Sport. He sought election to represent the multi-member electorate of Molonglo in the Assembly at the 1995 general election, however was unsuccessful at retaining his seat.
