= Chris Bourke =

Australian politician

Member of the ACT Legislative Assembly
- In office 1 June 2011 – 15 October 2016
- Preceded by: Jon Stanhope
- Constituency: Ginninderra

Personal details
- Party: Labor Party
- Education: Melbourne University
- Profession: Dentist
- Website: chrisbourke.com.au

Christopher John Bourke is an Australian politician, a Labor member of the Australian Capital Territory Legislative Assembly representing the electorate of Ginninderra from 2011 to 2016. He was the first Indigenous Australian elected to the ACT Legislative Assembly. He filled the casual vacancy created by the resignation of former Chief Minister Jon Stanhope.

Bourke grew up in country Australia. He graduated from Melbourne University in 1982, where he was the first Indigenous Australian to complete a dentistry degree. He undertook graduate studies at the University of Adelaide and the University of Sydney. Prior to being elected in 2011, Bourke worked as a dentist, performing locum dentistry work in remote areas of Australia after a period of private practice in Canberra. He is President of the Indigenous Dentists' Association of Australia.

== Political career ==
Bourke was elected to the Australian Capital Territory Legislative Assembly following the resignation of former Chief Minister Jon Stanhope. His election was the result of a countback of ballots cast for Stanhope in the 2008 Australian Capital Territory election. Following his election, Mr Bourke was made Minister of Education, Minister for Aboriginal and Torres Strait Islander Affairs, Minister for Industrial Relations, and Minister for Corrections until the 2012 election, when he was not reappointed as a minister.

On 22 January 2016, Bourke was reappointed as a minister, and was made Minister for Aboriginal and Torres Strait Islander Affairs, Minister for Children and Young People, Minister for Disability, Minister for Small Business and the Arts and Minister for Veterans and Seniors. Bourke was defeated at the 2016 election in October.
