= List of Australian Capital Territory ministries =

The ministries of the Australian Capital Territory are appointed by the government each term from the members of the Australian Capital Territory Legislative Assembly. The current ministry is the Fourth Barr Ministry since 2024.

#	Name	Party	Coalition Partners	Date appointed	Date replaced
1	First Follett Ministry	Labor	—	16 May 1989	5 December 1989
2	Kaine Ministry	Liberal	Residents Rally / Independents Group	5 December 1989	18 June 1991
3	Second Follett Ministry	Labor	—	18 June 1991	6 April 1992
4	Third Follett Ministry	Labor	—	6 April 1992	15 March 1995
5	First Carnell Ministry	Liberal	—	15 March 1995	31 March 1998
6	Second Carnell Ministry	Liberal	Moore Independents	31 March 1998	19 October 2000
7	Humphries Ministry	Liberal	Moore Independents	19 October 2000	13 November 2001
8	First Stanhope Ministry	Labor	—	13 November 2001	4 November 2004
9	Second Stanhope Ministry	Labor	—	4 November 2004	11 November 2008
10	Third Stanhope Ministry	Labor	—	11 November 2008	16 May 2011
11	First Gallagher Ministry	Labor	—	16 May 2011	6 November 2012
12	Second Gallagher Ministry	Labor	Greens	7 November 2012	14 December 2014
13	First Barr Ministry	Labor	Greens	15 December 2014	31 October 2016
14	Second Barr Ministry	Labor	Greens	1 November 2016	3 November 2020
15	Third Barr Ministry	Labor	Greens	3 November 2020	6 November 2024
15	Fourth Barr Ministry	Labor	—	7 November 2024	Incumbent

== See also ==
- Members of the Australian Capital Territory Legislative Assembly
- Chief Ministers of the Australian Capital Territory
