= Katy Gallagher =

Australian politician (born 1970)

Senator The Honourable Katy Gallagher
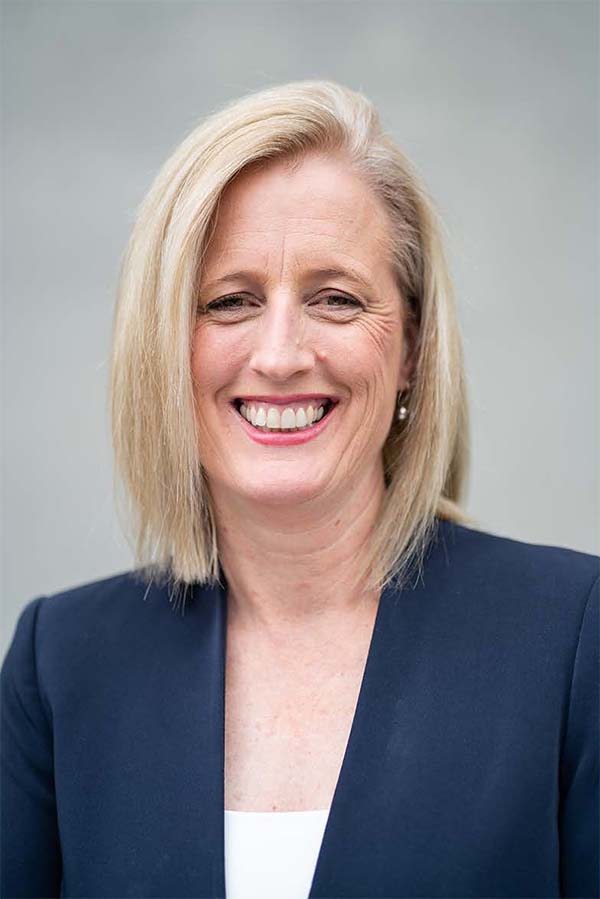
- Official portrait, 2022

Minister for Government Services
- Incumbent
- Assumed office 20 January 2025
- Prime Minister: Anthony Albanese
- Preceded by: Bill Shorten

Vice-President of the Executive Council
- Incumbent
- Assumed office 23 May 2022
- Prime Minister: Anthony Albanese
- Preceded by: Simon Birmingham

Minister for Finance
- Incumbent
- Assumed office 23 May 2022
- Prime Minister: Anthony Albanese
- Preceded by: Simon Birmingham

Minister for Women
- Incumbent
- Assumed office 23 May 2022
- Prime Minister: Anthony Albanese
- Preceded by: Marise Payne

Minister for the Public Service
- Incumbent
- Assumed office 1 June 2022
- Prime Minister: Anthony Albanese
- Preceded by: Ben Morton

Manager of Government Business in the Senate
- Incumbent
- Assumed office 31 May 2022
- Prime Minister: Anthony Albanese
- Preceded by: Anne Ruston

Senator for the Australian Capital Territory
- Incumbent
- Assumed office 21 May 2019
- Preceded by: David Smith
- In office 25 March 2015 – 9 May 2018
- Preceded by: Kate Lundy
- Succeeded by: David Smith
ACT Legislative Assembly
6th Chief Minister of the Australian Capital Territory Elections: 2012
In office 16 May 2011 – 11 December 2014
Deputy	Andrew Barr
Preceded by	Jon Stanhope
Succeeded by	Andrew Barr
10th Deputy Chief Minister of the Australian Capital Territory
In office 20 April 2006 – 16 May 2011
Preceded by	Ted Quinlan
Succeeded by	Andrew Barr
7th Treasurer of the Australian Capital Territory
In office 11 November 2008 – 30 June 2011
Preceded by	Jon Stanhope
Succeeded by	Andrew Barr
Member of the ACT Legislative Assembly for Molonglo
In office 20 October 2001 – 23 December 2014
Preceded by	Jacqui Burke
Succeeded by	Meegan Fitzharris

Personal details
- Born: Katherine Ruth Gallagher; 18 March 1970 (age 56) Weston Creek, Australian Capital Territory, Australia
- Citizenship: Australia; British (until 2016)
- Party: Labor
- Children: 3
- Education: Australian National University
- Profession: Community worker, union organiser
- Cabinet: Gallagher ministry I; II
- Website: www.katygallagher.com.au

Katherine Ruth Gallagher (/'gæləhər/ GAL-ə-her; born 18 March 1970) is an Australian politician who has been serving as the Minister for Finance, Minister for Women, Minister for the Public Service and Vice-President of the Executive Council in the Albanese Government since 2022 and since 2025 as Minister for Government Services. She also formerly served as the 6th Chief Minister of the Australian Capital Territory from 2011 to 2014. She has been a Senator for the Australian Capital Territory since the 2019 federal election, as a member of the Australian Labor Party (ALP) having previously served in the Senate from 2015 to 2018.

Gallagher grew up in Canberra and was a social worker and union organiser with the Community and Public Sector Union (CPSU) before entering politics. She was elected to the Australian Capital Territory Legislative Assembly in 2001, representing the electorate of Molonglo. She was made a minister under Jon Stanhope in 2002, and appointed Deputy Chief Minister in 2006. Gallagher became Chief Minister in 2011 after Stanhope's retirement, and led her party to a fourth consecutive term at the 2012 general election. She resigned in 2014 to seek preselection to the Senate.

In March 2015, Gallagher was appointed to fill the casual vacancy caused by the retirement of Senator Kate Lundy. She was appointed to Bill Shorten's shadow ministry later in the year, and elected to the Senate in her own right at the 2016 federal election. She was subsequently elected Manager of Opposition Business in the Senate. In December 2017, during the parliamentary eligibility crisis, Gallagher was referred to the High Court. The court ruled in May 2018 that she was disqualified from sitting in the Senate for failing to renounce her British citizenship before nomination for election in 2016. She returned to her previous Senate seat at the 2019 federal election.

== Early years and education ==
Katherine Ruth Gallagher was born on 18 March 1970 in Waramanga, a suburb in the Weston Creek district of Canberra, to Betsy and Charles Gallagher. Her father was born in Stoke-on-Trent, England, and her mother in Guayaquil, Ecuador. Both were British citizens who later became Australian citizens after their arrival from England via New Zealand in 1969. She has an elder sister, Clare, along with two younger brothers who were adopted, Richard and Matthew. Her father died in 1995 of lung cancer and her mother in 2005 with peritoneal cancer .

Educated at Duffy Primary School, Melrose High School and Canberra College (previously known as Phillip College), Gallagher completed her studies by obtaining a Bachelor of Arts in Political Science and Sociology at the Australian National University in 1990.

She also had training as a cellist, and played with the Canberra Youth Orchestra.

== Early career ==
Gallagher was initially employed as a social worker, assisting with a community life skills project and working with children with disabilities. From 1994 to 1997, she worked as an advocate for People First ACT, a support and advocacy organisation for the intellectually disabled.

On 30 January 1997, Gallagher's fiancé, Brett Seaman, was killed in a cycling accident in Merimbula. At the time, Gallagher was 13 weeks pregnant with her first daughter. An 86-year-old female pensioner narrowly escaped a jail term for dangerous and irresponsible driving for the crash. The union movement assisted Gallagher with the funeral and court case that followed the accident.

Gallagher left her previous employment and was offered an administrative job at the Community and Public Sector Union (CPSU), where Seaman had worked. The job offer was made by Margaret Gillespie, who later went on to become Gallagher's chief of staff during her time as a politician. It was during this time she became involved in the labour movement, going on to become a national organiser with the union after her pregnancy.

== ACT politics ==
=== Early career ===
The support provided to Gallagher by the Labor Party and union movement inspired her to run for pre-selection as one of the Labor candidates for the electorate of Molonglo for the 2001 ACT general election. At the time, Labor had two incumbent members in the Assembly representing Molonglo. Long-serving independent Michael Moore retired at the election. The election saw Labor come to power, led by Jon Stanhope. Despite Gallagher winning just 4.38% of the first preference vote, following distribution of preferences, Gallagher was elected as the fifth member to the seven member seat, behind Humphries, Tucker, Corbell, and Quinlan.

Gallagher was appointed to the second arrangement of the first Stanhope ministry on 23 December 2002, when she was given the portfolios of education, youth and family services; women; and industrial relations. A minor change on 26 May 2004 saw Gallagher's ministry for education, youth and family services divided into separate responsibilities.

At the 2004 ACT general election, Gallagher polled strongly, generating 11.59% of the first preference vote and was the first candidate elected to represent Molonglo in the Assembly, ahead of both Labor colleagues, Quinlan and Corbell.

=== Deputy Chief Minister ===
Gallager's ministerial responsibilities were unchanged in the first arrangement of the second Stanhope ministry and, on 20 April 2006, following the retirement of Ted Quinlan, she was promoted to Deputy Chief Minister with ministerial responsibilities including health, disability and community services, and women. The ministry for children and young people was restored to Gallagher's responsibilities on 17 April 2007.

At the 2008 ACT general election, Gallagher again polled strongly, generating 15.78% of the first-preference vote and was the second candidate elected to represent Molonglo in the Assembly, behind Liberal leader, Seselja. In the third Stanhope ministry, Gallagher took on ministerial responsibility for treasury, in addition to retaining both health and women; whilst a subsequent reshuffle on 9 November 2009 saw her resume ministerial responsibility for industrial relations and lose the portfolio of women.

==== Health portfolio ====
Amid allegations of bullying, it was reported in early 2010 that nine obstetricians had resigned from Canberra Hospital in the preceding 13 months. The Royal College of Obstetricians and Gynaecologists called on Gallagher to conduct an external, transparent review of the hospital; and, although initially denying the claims, Gallagher agreed to two external reviews, one to look at workplace issues and the other to investigate patient outcomes. The patient outcome review, when handed down in August 2010, sharply criticised hospital management with regards to workload, but stated that patient care was adequate. A number of months earlier, Gallagher faced pressure from the Catholic Church, following an agreement that the ACT Government would purchase Calvary Hospital (in Bruce) from the Little Company of Mary Health Care (LCMHC) – an independent arm of the Church – for $77m. Catholic Archbishop of Sydney, Cardinal George Pell claimed that the Government's motives were ideological and driven by anti-Christian elements. Gallagher denied the claims. A dispute subsequently arose between LCMHC and the Government over an accounting concession and the government withdrew from the purchase. The culmination of these matters led the Liberal leader, Zed Seselja, on 17 August 2010, to move a no confidence vote in the Assembly against Gallagher as Minister for Health as follows:

That this Assembly no longer has confidence in the Minister for Health, Katy Gallagher, for her continued neglect of the Health portfolio, most particularly... management failure, staff bullying, over working, and poor processes; ... complete failure in the Calvary Hospital purchase; ... and many instances of attacking those who made complaints, ignoring those who gave advice, and dealing with the problems through denial and neglect; ... and the ongoing poor performance of the ACT health system ...

The motion was defeated (five in favour, nine against), with the ACT Greens supporting the government.

=== Chief Minister ===
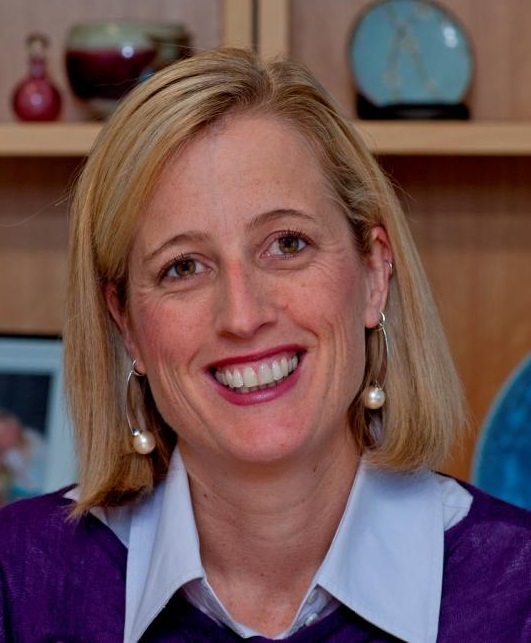
Gallagher in 2011

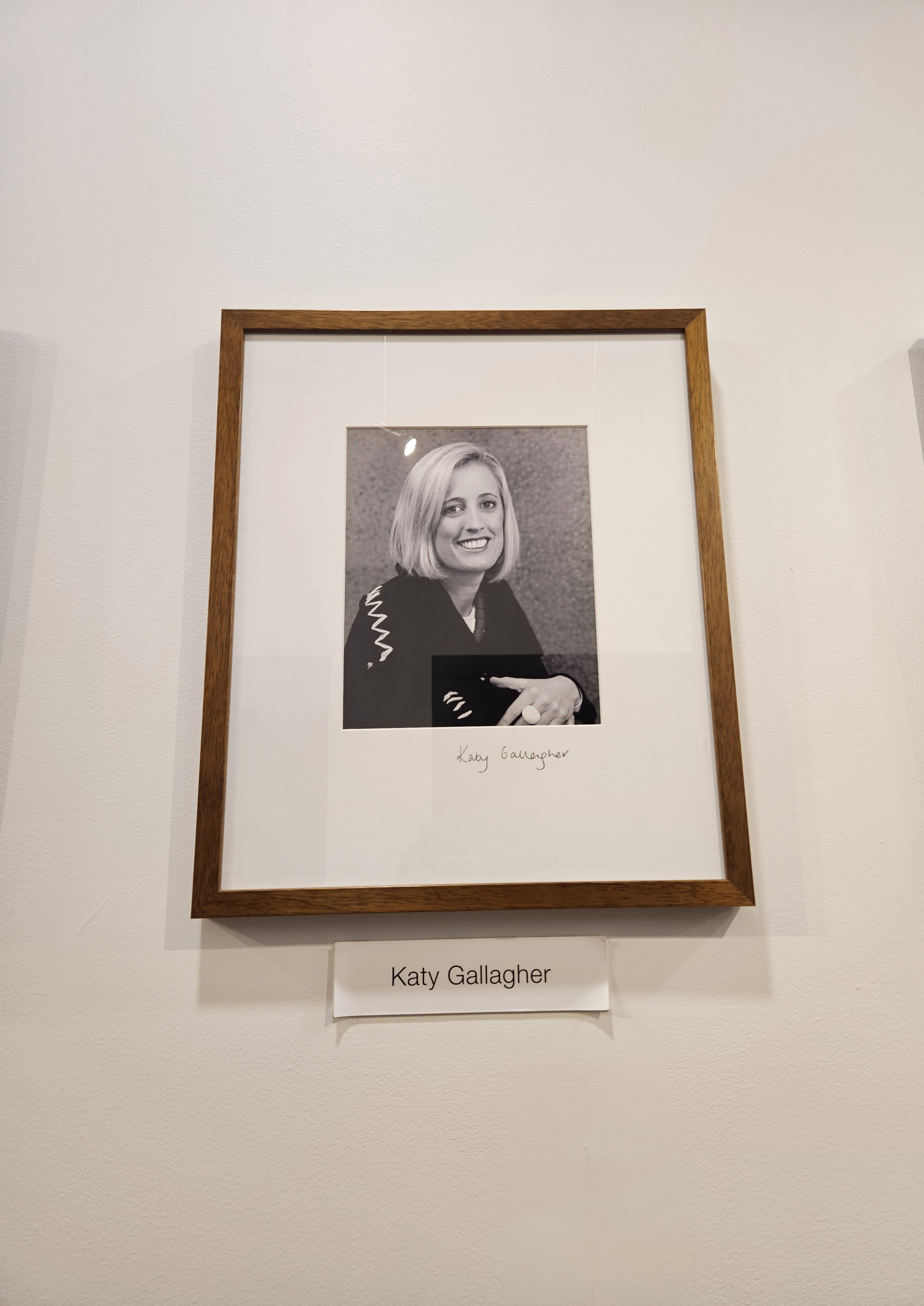
Gallagher's portrait on display at the Assembly

On 12 May 2011, while Gallagher was deputy chief minister, the current chief minister at the time, Jon Stanhope, resigned. On 16 May 2011, Gallagher was elected by the Assembly as the ACT's 6th Chief Minister and 3rd female Chief Minister. The ALP won an additional seat in the 2012 election, and remained in government after securing the support of the sole remaining Green MLA, Shane Rattenbury.

Gallagher is a supporter of same-sex marriage and on 22 October 2013, she oversaw the ACT becoming the first jurisdiction in Australia to pass a law allowing couples of the same sex to marry. This was later overturned by the High Court on 12 December, just days after the first marriages took place. The court ruled only the Commonwealth has the power to make changes to the Marriage Act.

During her term as Chief Minister, Gallagher welcomed The Queen during her 16th tour to Australia in October 2011 along with the Duke and Duchess of Cambridge in April 2014.

On 5 December 2014, Gallagher announced that she would resign as chief minister to pursue the upcoming Senate vacancy left by the resignation of Kate Lundy. She resigned as Chief Minister and her deputy Andrew Barr was elected as her replacement on 11 December 2014. As of 2026, Katy Gallagher is the only A.C.T. Chief Minister that was born in Canberra.

== Federal politics ==
=== Opposition ===
Gallagher is a member of Labor Left. She was sworn in as a Senator on 26 March 2015 and on 25 September 2015 nominated to join the Shadow Ministry in the Labor Party Caucus. She was elected by the caucus alongside Jim Chalmers unopposed.

On 13 October 2015, Gallagher was appointed to the Shadow Cabinet in the roles of Shadow Minister for Mental Health, Shadow Minister for Housing and Homelessness, and Shadow Minister Assisting the Leader on State and Territory Relations. She held those positions until 23 July 2016 when she was promoted to Shadow Minister for Small Business and Financial Services after the 2016 election. On 12 September 2016, Gallagher was also appointed as Manager of Opposition Business in the Senate.

In 2016, Gallagher accused fellow senator Mitch Fifield of "mansplaining" during a debate in a Senate committee hearing regarding social services legislation, which subsequently went viral.

On 6 December 2017, at her own request, the Senate referred Gallagher to the High Court of Australia to determine her eligibility for election in the 2016 federal election as a part of the 2017–18 Australian parliamentary eligibility crisis.

On 9 May 2018, in a unanimous decision, the full bench of the High Court of Australia found that Gallagher was not eligible for election at the 2016 federal election given that she had still been a British citizen when nominating as a candidate on 31 May 2016 for the election which was held on 2 July 2016. Gallagher completed her Form RN declaration of renunciation of British citizenship on 20 April and the ACT Labor Party lodged it with the UK Home Office on 26 April, the court finding "Senator Gallagher retained that status until 16 August 2016, when her declaration of renunciation of that citizenship was registered by the Home Office of the United Kingdom."

=== Return to politics ===
After her disqualification from the Senate, Gallagher worked as a consultant at Calvary Hospital and joined the board of the RSPCA ACT division. In June 2018, Gallagher announced that she would seek nomination for an ACT seat in the Senate at the next federal election. She successfully sought re-election at the 2019 federal election and took on the role of Shadow Minister for Finance and the Public Service in the Albanese shadow ministry.

In April 2020, she was appointed chair of the parliamentary committee into the government's response to the Coronavirus pandemic. In August 2021, she criticised the rollout of the vaccine program after her youngest daughter Evie tested positive to the virus. At the conclusion of the parliamentary term, the committee handed down its report which included recommending a royal commission into the government's handling of the pandemic.

Gallagher also introduced a bill to parliament to amend the Public Governance, Performance and Accountability Act 2013 titled The Public Governance, Performance and Accountability Amendment (Improved Grants Reporting) Bill 2021, in response to the grant programs being administered by the Morrison government which had resulted in criticism from both the Productivity Commission and through various ANAO reports.

=== Albanese Government (2022–present) ===
On 23 May 2022 after Labor's victory at the federal election, Gallagher was sworn in as Minister for Finance, Minister for Health, Minister for Women, Minister for Social Services and Attorney-General. The portfolios of health, social services and attorney-general were only interim until the full Albanese ministry could be sworn in. She is the only holder of the Attorney-General portfolio to have had no prior legal experience, as she was appointed on the basis of holding the office for an interim period and act to "take care" of issues. On 1 June with the swearing in of the full cabinet, Gallagher was also sworn in as Minister for the Public Service. She was additionally appointed Manager of Government Business in the Senate.

In October 2022 with Jim Chalmers overseas for meetings, Gallagher became Acting Treasurer, only the second woman to do so.

As part of her election platform, Gallagher campaigned for the repeal of the Euthanasia Laws Act 1997 which prevented the territories from passing legislation to legalise euthanasia and secured a commitment from Albanese to have it as one of the new government's first order of business if elected. The bill was introduced into parliament and passed the lower house on 3 August and voted into law on 1 December with Gallagher managing the debate in the Senate.

In June 2023 Gallagher was accused of misleading parliament after private text messages were released suggesting she may have had prior knowledge of Brittany Higgins' alleged sexual assault before the allegations became public. She subsequently made a speech in parliament clarifying this knowledge and denied any wrongdoing.

In January 2025 with the resignation of Bill Shorten from parliament, Gallagher was additionally sworn in as Minister for Government Services.

== Personal life ==
Gallagher was previously engaged to Brett Seaman, who died in a road accident in 1997 when she was pregnant with her first child. She and her partner Dave Skinner are raising three children.

Gallagher is a vegetarian and is a classically trained cellist, who used to play with the Canberra Youth Orchestra.

== See also ==
- First Gallagher ministry
- Second Gallagher ministry
- Albanese ministry
- List of female heads of government in Australia
- List of the first women holders of political offices in Oceania

Political offices
Preceded by Simon Birmingham	Vice-President of the Executive Council; 2022–present	Incumbent
Preceded by Simon Birmingham	Minister for Finance; 2022–present	Incumbent
Preceded by Ben Morton	Minister for the Public Service; 2022–present	Incumbent
Preceded by Marise Payne	Minister for Women; 2022–present	Incumbent
Preceded by Bill Shorten	Minister for Government Services; 2025–present	Incumbent
Preceded by Ted Quinlan	Deputy Chief Minister of the Australian Capital Territory; 2006–2011	Succeeded by Andrew Barr
Preceded by Simon Corbell	Minister for Health; 2006–2014	Succeeded by Simon Corbell
Preceded by Jon Stanhope	Treasurer of the Australian Capital Territory; 2008–2011	Succeeded by Andrew Barr
Preceded by Jon Stanhope	Chief Minister of the Australian Capital Territory; 2011–2014	Succeeded by Andrew Barr
Parliament of Australia
Preceded by Kate Lundy; David Smith	Senator for the Australian Capital Territory; 2015–2018; 2019–present	Succeeded by David Smith; Incumbent
Preceded by Sam Dastyari; Jacinta Collins	Manager of Opposition Business in the Senate; 2016–2017; 2019–2022	Succeeded by Jacinta Collins; Anne Ruston
