= Joy Burch =

Australian politician

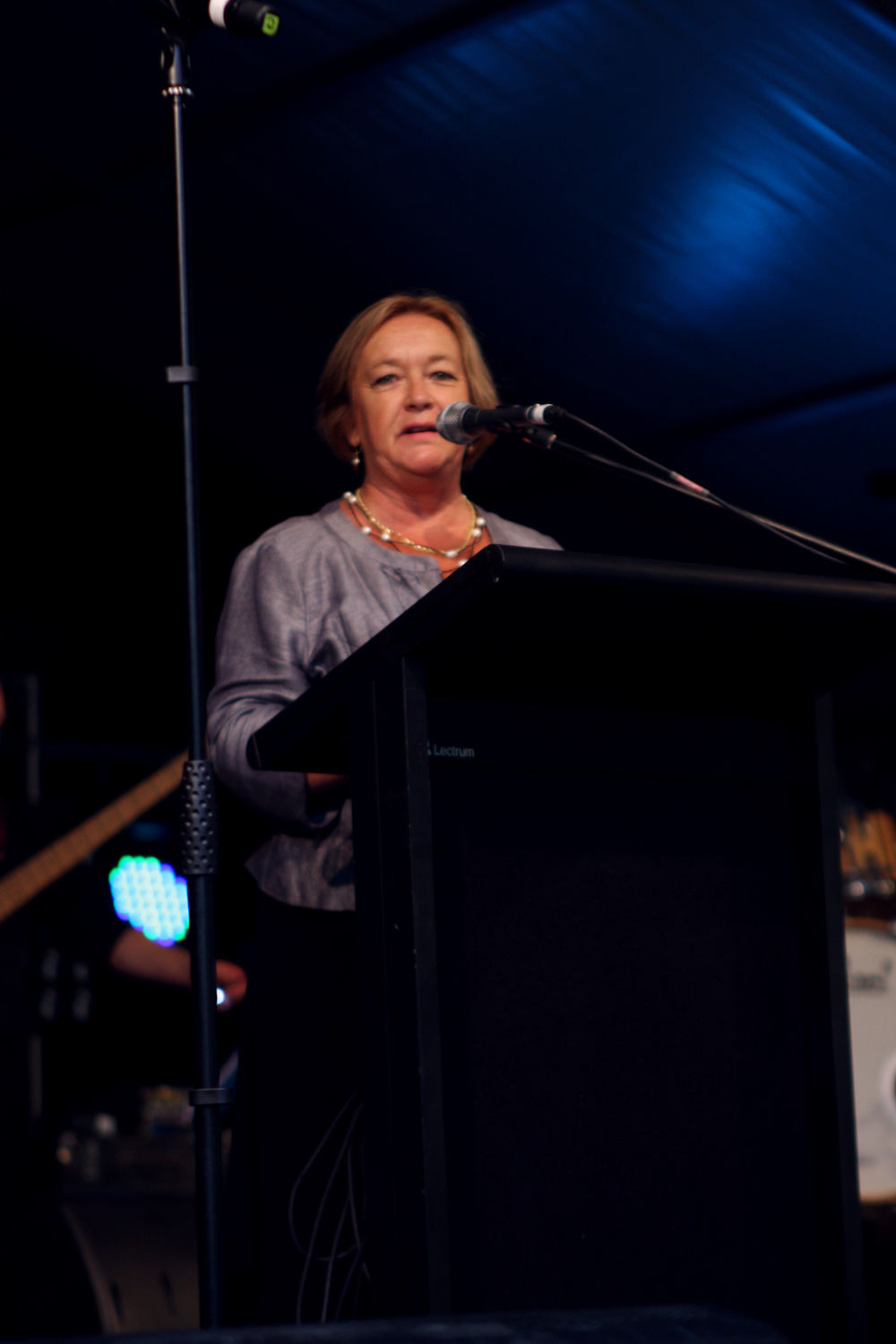

7th Speaker of the Australian Capital Territory Legislative Assembly
- In office 31 October 2016 – 6 November 2024
- Deputy: Vicki Dunne; Mark Parton
- Preceded by: Vicki Dunne
- Succeeded by: Mark Parton

Minister for Education and Training, Minister for Multiculturalism, Minister for Disability, Minister for Women, Minister for Arts, Minister for Gaming and Racing
- In office December 2015 – January 2016

Member of the Australian Capital Territory Legislative Assembly for Brindabella
- In office November 2008 – October 2024

Personal details
- Born: Sydney, New South Wales, Australia
- Party: Labor Party
- Children: Three
- Profession: Registered nurse, politician

Joy Marie Burch is an Australian former politician who served as a Labor member of the ACT Legislative Assembly for Brindabella from 2008 to 2024. She served in various ministerial portfolios between 2009 and 2016 and Speaker of the Assembly from 2016 to 2024.

== Biography ==
Prior to being elected to the Legislative Assembly, Burch was a registered nurse. She worked for several years as a community nurse across southern NSW and the ACT.

Burch lived for several years in Alice Springs, as the executive director of the Australian Rural Health Education Network, as executive director of the Northern Territory Remote Workforce Agency and as the CEO of the Rural Health and Community Support Services. She also was the owner and operator of a Childcare Centre.

Burch has formal tertiary education, with a Bachelor of Arts in Liberal Studies, and Post-Graduate qualifications in Health Administration and Information Systems Management.

== Political career ==
Burch was first elected to the Australian Capital Territory Legislative Assembly in the Brindabella electorate at the 2008 election. Upon entering the Assembly, Burch was appointed Government Whip, Assistant Speaker and ALP Caucus Secretary.

A year later, Burch was appointed to Cabinet. Over the next seven years, she held a number of Ministerial positions, including:

• Minister for Education and Training (November 2012 – January 2016)
• Minister for Police and Emergency Services (December 2014 – December 2015)
• Minister for Disability (November 2012 – January 2016)
• Minister for Racing and Gaming (May 2011 – January 2016)
• Minister for Arts (May 2011 – January 2016)
• Minister for Aboriginal and Torres Strait Islanders Affairs (May 2011 – October 2012)
• Minister for Ageing (November 2009 – October 2012)
• Minister for Children and Young People (November 2012 – July 2014)
• Minister for Community Services (November 2009 – October 2012)
• Minister for Multicultural Affairs (November 2009 – January 2015)
• Minister for Women (November 2009 – January 2015)

She was re-elected at the 2012 election.

Burch faced controversy when it was alleged that her chief of staff briefed the Construction, Forestry, Maritime, Mining and Energy Union (CFMEU) on matters regarding ACT Policing which are still under investigation. She resigned as Minister for Police and Emergency Services in December 2015 before resigning from all other ministerial positions a month later in January 2016. She then became Deputy Speaker and Government Whip.

Burch was again re-elected at the 2016 election, and was subsequently elected Speaker of the ACT Legislative Assembly. and she was elected Speaker of the Australian Capital Territory Legislative Assembly.

Burch was again re-elected at the 2020 Australian Capital Territory election, receiving the highest vote of any candidate in the Brindabella Electorate, and obtaining a significant swing towards her. She was re-elected Speaker of the ACT Legislative Assembly for the tenth parliament.

Burch is a member of the Centre Coalition (Labor Right) faction.

== Personal life ==
Burch is married with three sons and lives in Tuggeranong. Her hobbies include spending time with her family, community events and volunteering, swimming, gardening, walking, reading, and listening to music.

Australian Capital Territory Legislative Assembly
Preceded by Mick Gentleman	Member for Brindabella in the ACT Legislative Assembly; 2008–2024	Succeeded by Caitlin Tough
Preceded by Vicki Dunne	Speaker of the Australian Capital Territory Legislative Assembly; 2016–2024	Succeeded by Mark Parton
