= Chief Minister of the Australian Capital Territory =

Head of government of the Australian Capital Territory, in Australia

- Coat of arms of the Australian Capital Territory

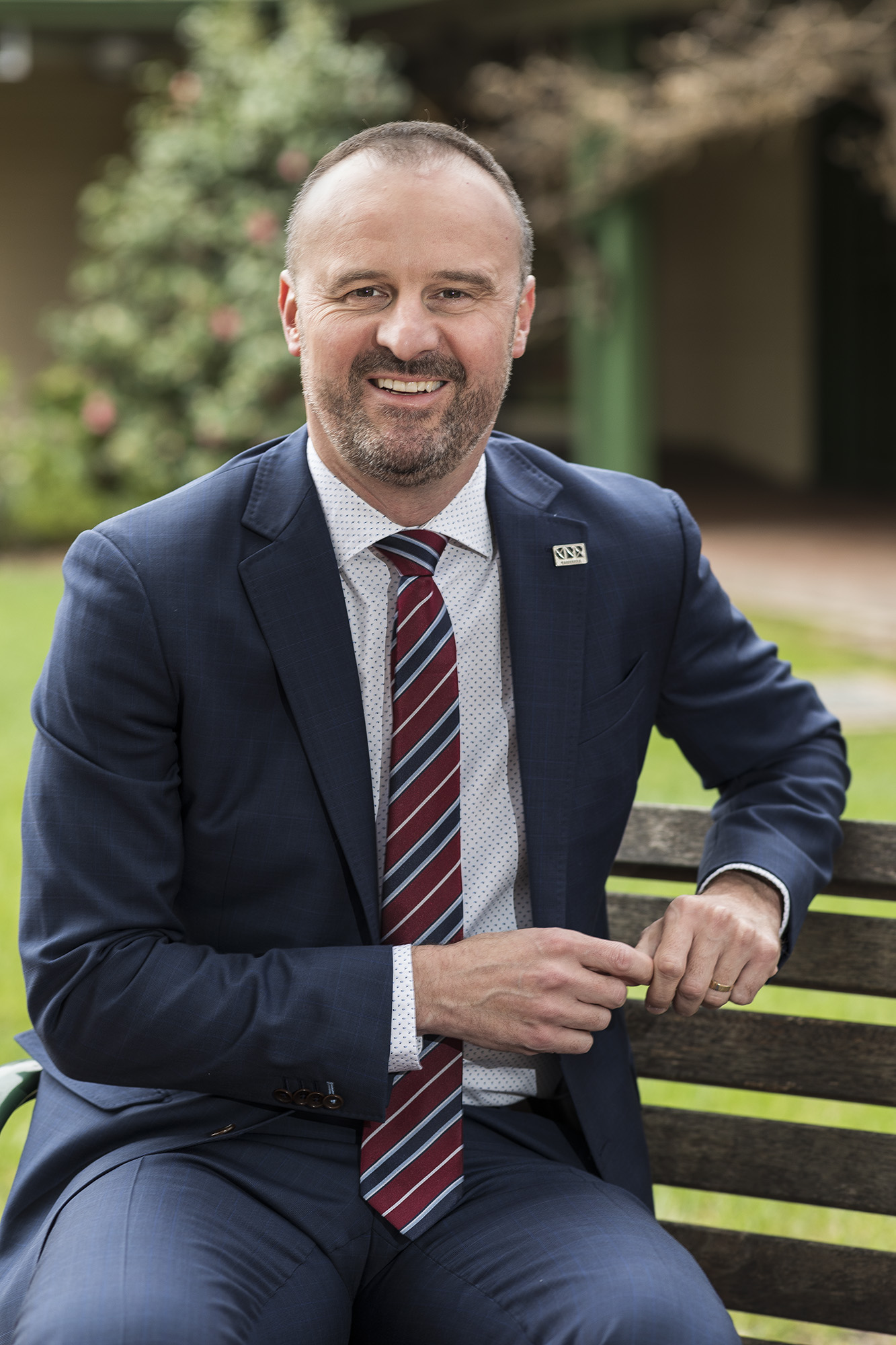
- Incumbent; Andrew Barr since 11 December 2014
- Chief Minister, Treasury and Economic Development Directorate
- Style: The Honourable
- Status: Head of government
- Abbreviation: CM
- Member of: ACT Cabinet (Barr IV); National Cabinet
- Reports to: Legislative Assembly
- Seat: 1 Constitution Avenue, Canberra
- Appointer: Australian Capital Territory Legislative Assembly
- Constituting instrument: Australian Capital Territory (Self-Government) Act 1988 (Cth), section 40
- Formation: 11 May 1989
- First holder: Rosemary Follett
- Deputy: Deputy Chief Minister of the Australian Capital Territory
- Salary: A$416,538

The chief minister of the Australian Capital Territory is the head of government of the Australian Capital Territory (ACT). The leader of the party with the largest number of seats in the unicameral Australian Capital Territory Legislative Assembly usually takes on the role. Unlike other states and territories, the chief minister is not appointed by a governor or administrator, but elected directly by the Assembly.

The chief minister is the rough equivalent of the state premiers, and has been a member of the National Cabinet since its creation in 2020. The chief minister previously also represented the ACT on the Council of Australian Governments (COAG). Since there are no local governments in the territory, the chief minister's role is also similar to that of the mayor of a local government area. The chief minister sits on the Council of Capital City Lord Mayors.

The current chief minister is Andrew Barr of the Australian Labor Party (ALP), who was first elected by the Assembly on 11 December 2014 following the resignation of Katy Gallagher. Barr is also the longest serving Chief Minister in the ACT.

== List of officeholders ==
No.	Portrait	Name Electorate (Birth–death)	Election	Term of office			Political party	Ministry
No.	Portrait	Name Electorate (Birth–death)	Election	Took office	Left office	Time in office	Political party	Ministry
1		Rosemary Follett; MLA (born 1948)	1989	11 May 1989	5 December 1989	208 days	Labor	Follett I
2		Trevor Kaine; MLA (1928–2008)	—	5 December 1989	6 June 1991	1 year, 183 days	Liberal	Kaine
(1)		Rosemary Follett; MLA (born 1948)	—	6 June 1991	2 March 1995	3 years, 269 days	Labor	Follett II
(1)		Rosemary Follett; MLA (born 1948)	1992	6 June 1991	2 March 1995	3 years, 269 days	Labor	Follett III
3		Kate Carnell; MLA for Molonglo (born 1955)	1995	2 March 1995	18 October 2000	5 years, 230 days	Liberal	Carnell I
3		Kate Carnell; MLA for Molonglo (born 1955)	1998	2 March 1995	18 October 2000	5 years, 230 days	Liberal	Carnell II
4		Gary Humphries; MLA for Molonglo (born 1958)	—	18 October 2000	5 November 2001	1 year, 18 days	Liberal	Humphries
5		Jon Stanhope; MLA for Ginninderra (born 1951)	2001	5 November 2001	12 May 2011	9 years, 188 days	Labor	Stanhope I
5		Jon Stanhope; MLA for Ginninderra (born 1951)	2004	5 November 2001	12 May 2011	9 years, 188 days	Labor	Stanhope II
5		Jon Stanhope; MLA for Ginninderra (born 1951)	2008	5 November 2001	12 May 2011	9 years, 188 days	Labor	Stanhope III
6		Katy Gallagher; MLA for Molonglo (born 1970)	—	16 May 2011	11 December 2014	3 years, 209 days	Labor	Gallagher I
6		Katy Gallagher; MLA for Molonglo (born 1970)	2012	16 May 2011	11 December 2014	3 years, 209 days	Labor	Gallagher II
7		Andrew Barr; MLA for Kurrajong (born 1973)	—	11 December 2014	Incumbent	11 years, 331 days	Labor	Barr I
7		Andrew Barr; MLA for Kurrajong (born 1973)	2016	11 December 2014	Incumbent	11 years, 331 days	Labor	Barr II
7		Andrew Barr; MLA for Kurrajong (born 1973)	2020	11 December 2014	Incumbent	11 years, 331 days	Labor	Barr III
7		Andrew Barr; MLA for Kurrajong (born 1973)	2024	11 December 2014	Incumbent	11 years, 331 days	Labor	Barr IV

== Rank by time in office ==
This is a list of chief ministers of the Australian Capital Territory by time in office. The basis of the list is the inclusive number of days between dates.

Parties

Australian Labor Party Liberal Party of Australia

Rank	Portrait	Officeholder	Party	District	Assumed office	Left office	Time in office (term)	Time in office (total)	Election wins
1.		Andrew Barr (1973–)	Labor	MLA for Molonglo (2006–2016); MLA for Kurrajong (2016- )	11 December 2014	Incumbent		11 years, 331 days	2016; 2020; 2024
2.		Jon Stanhope (1951–); AO	Labor	MLA for Ginninderra (1998–2011)	12 November 2001	12 May 2011		9 years, 181 days	2001; 2004; 2008
3.		Kate Carnell (1955–); AO	Liberal	MLA for Molonglo (1992–2000)	9 March 1995	17 October 2000		5 years, 222 days	1995; 1998
4.		Rosemary Follett (1948–); AO	Labor	MLA for Molonglo (1995–1996)	11 May 1989	5 December 1989	208 days	4 years, 122 days	1989; 1992
4.		Rosemary Follett (1948–); AO	Labor	MLA for Molonglo (1995–1996)	6 June 1991	9 March 1995	3 years, 276 days	4 years, 122 days	1989; 1992
5.		Katy Gallagher (1970–)	Labor	MLA for Molonglo (2001–2014)	16 May 2011	10 December 2014		3 years, 208 days	2012
6.		Trevor Kaine (1928–2008)	Liberal	MLA for Brindabella (1995–2001)	5 December 1989	6 June 1991		1 year, 183 days	
7.		Gary Humphries (1958–)	Liberal	MLA for Molonglo (1995–2002)	18 October 2000	12 November 2001		1 year, 25 days	

== Total time in office of political parties in Australian Capital Territory ==
Australian Capital Territory Assembly – 13694 days as of 7 November 2026

=== Labor ===
- 10706 days as of 7 November 2026.

=== Liberal ===
- 2990 days.

== See also ==
- States and territories of Australia (includes some information about the role of the chief minister)
- Deputy Chief Minister of the Australian Capital Territory
- Australian Capital Territory ministries
- List of Australian heads of government by time in office
- List of prime ministers of Australia by time in office
- List of premiers of New South Wales by time in office
- List of premiers of Queensland by time in office
- List of premiers of South Australia by time in office
- List of premiers of Tasmania by time in office
- List of premiers of Victoria by time in office
- List of premiers of Western Australia by time in office
- List of chief ministers of the Northern Territory by time in office
