= Jon Stanhope =

Australian politician

Jon Stanhope AO
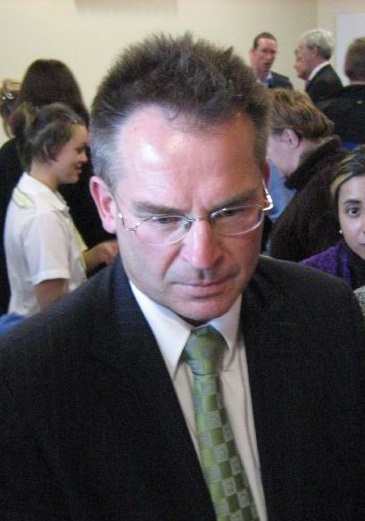
- Stanhope in 2006

Administrator of the Australian Indian Ocean Territories
- In office 5 October 2012 – 5 October 2014
- Monarch: Elizabeth II
- Governors General: Quentin Bryce; Peter Cosgrove
- Preceded by: Brian Lacy
- Succeeded by: Barry Haase

5th Chief Minister of the Australian Capital Territory Elections: 2001, 2004, 2008
- In office 5 November 2001 – 12 May 2011
- Deputy: Ted Quinlan (2001–2006); Katy Gallagher (2006–2011)
- Preceded by: Gary Humphries
- Succeeded by: Katy Gallagher

Leader of the Opposition of the Australian Capital Territory Elections: 2001
- In office 19 March 1998 – 12 November 2001
- Preceded by: Wayne Berry
- Succeeded by: Gary Humphries

Member of the Australian Capital Territory Legislative Assembly for Ginninderra
- In office 21 February 1998 – 16 May 2011
- Preceded by: Roberta McRae
- Succeeded by: Chris Bourke

Personal details
- Born: 29 April 1951 (age 75) Gundagai, New South Wales
- Party: Labor Party
- Children: Four children
- Education: Australian National University
- Profession: Lawyer; Political activist

Jonathan Donald Stanhope AO (born 29 April 1951) is a former Australian politician who was Labor Chief Minister of the Australian Capital Territory from 2001 to 2011. Stanhope represented the Ginninderra electorate in the ACT Legislative Assembly from 1998 until 2011. He is the only ACT Chief Minister to have governed with a majority in the ACT Assembly. From 2012 to 2014 Stanhope was Administrator of the Australian Indian Ocean Territories, which consists of Christmas Island and Cocos (Keeling) Islands.

== Early years and background ==
Stanhope was born in Gundagai, New South Wales. He was one of nine children of schoolteacher parents who had emigrated from England. At age 5 he injured his knee, which developed into osteomyelitis, resulting in one leg being 2.5 inches longer than the other. He walked with a pronounced limp until the issue was corrected surgically at age 16. Much of his junior education was spent at one-teacher schools in country NSW. He attended Mullumbimby Public School and Bega High School before coming to Canberra to undertake studies at the Australian National University, graduating as a Bachelor of Laws.

Between 1979 and 1987, Stanhope held a range of community roles including:

- President ACT Council for Civil Liberties
- Original co-convener of Racial Respect in the ACT
- President ACT Hospice and Palliative Care Society
- ACT convener of the National Coalition for Gun Control

Between 1987 and 1991, Stanhope was Secretary of the House of Representatives Standing Committee on Legal and Constitutional Affairs; and between 1991 and 1993, Deputy Administrator and Official Secretary of Norfolk Island. From 1993 to 1996, Stanhope worked as Senior Adviser and Chief of Staff for the Federal Attorney-General, Michael Lavarch, and between 1996 and 1998, advised the then Federal Opposition Leader, Kim Beazley, on native title.

== Political career ==
Stanhope was elected to the ACT Legislative Assembly representing the Ginninderra electorate at the 1998 ACT general election and was immediately elected Opposition Leader by the Labor caucus.

At the 2001 ACT general election, Stanhope defeated the Liberal government of Gary Humphries, although with a hung parliament, and was elected Chief Minister. In the lead-up to the election, Stanhope played a major role in the Bruce Stadium affair that led to the resignation of the then Chief Minister, Kate Carnell.

On 13 January 2003, Stanhope helped rescue a helicopter pilot who had crashed in a dam during a firefighting operation. Stanhope, who was in a second helicopter with crew and the ACT head of the bushfire services, Peter Lucas-Smith, had responded to the stricken pilot's Mayday call. The man had suffered serious head injuries and was taken to the Canberra Hospital in a critical condition. After the rescue Stanhope praised the emergency services: "It provided to me a very stark awareness of the enormous risks that many in our community take, the extent to which so many people put their lives on their line to ensure the protection of our communities".

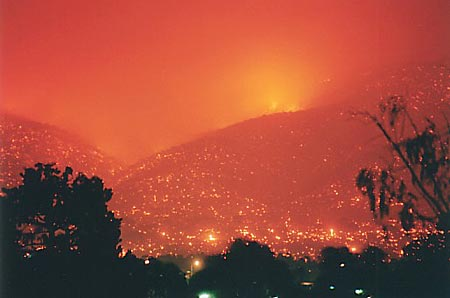
Hills near suburban Canberra engulfed in flames

Canberra was hit by bushfires in January 2003. Four people died and 500 houses were destroyed. Stanhope faced a no-confidence motion in the Assembly from the Liberal opposition, which if passed meant he would have been forced to resign as Chief Minister. Instead, the motion was downgraded to a censure motion by the combined vote of the ALP and the Democrats and passed in the Assembly. The coronial inquest into the bushfire was released in mid-December 2006, and found significant bureaucratic failings contributed to the devastation, although it also claimed shortcomings at a political level.

At the 2004 ACT general election, Stanhope led the Labor Party to win sufficient seats to form a majority government, the first such government in the Territory's history.

As Chief Minister, he introduced a Human Rights Act, in 2004, the first jurisdiction in Australia to do so. In 2005, Stanhope published the confidential draft of the Federal Anti-Terrorism Bill 2005 on his website. Citing concerns about the removal of basic human rights, Stanhope later refused to sign a revised version of the legislation, becoming the only state or territory leader to do so.

In June 2006 Stanhope came under fire over the 2006–07 ACT Budget which was crafted to address ongoing budget deficits. The budget included massive rate rises, across the board fee hikes, a change in the ACT's emergency services management and the proposed closure of 38 schools and colleges through consolidation. The budget outcome led to ratings agency Standard & Poor's having to add qualification before reaffirming the ACT's AAA credit rating. Additionally the decision regarding distribution of the education budget prompted outcry in one Australian newspaper, with the Sydney-based Daily Telegraph labelling him "Stanhope-less" and an "economic vandal" on the front page of a special ACT edition.

Soon after the budget the ACT's Civil Unions Act, to allow formal recognition of same-sex relationships, was overturned by the Federal Howard government despite the objections of the ACT Government and its federal senators. The Rudd Government had advised it was not Labor policy to stifle state legislation, and that it would not block attempts by the ACT government on this issue. Despite this, the Rudd Government later threatened to override any laws introduced in the ACT that legislated for same-sex ceremonies. As a result, the Stanhope Government removed provisions for ceremonies in its proposal, and ultimately allowed for civil partnerships that did not include legislated ceremonies. The Stanhope Government reported that the number of new civil partnerships entered into "exceeded expectations".

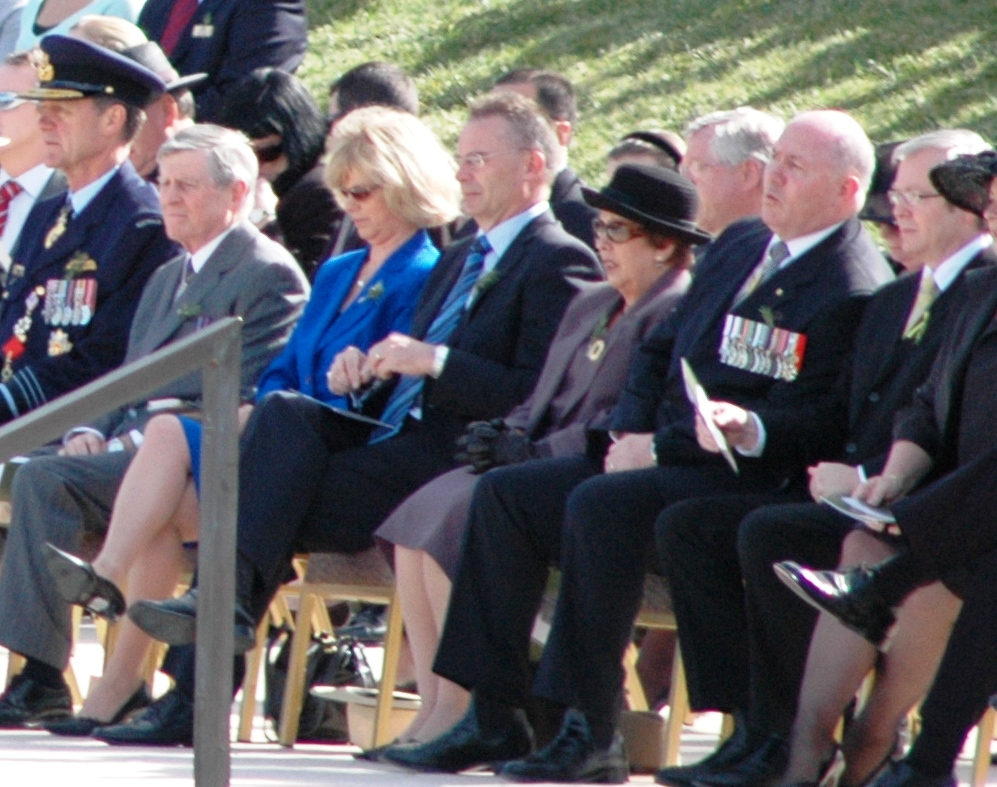
In attendance at the 2008 Anzac Day National Service at the Australian War Memorial in Canberra are Angus Houston, Chief of the Defence Force (Australia) (left) Jon Stanhope, Chief Minister of the Australian Capital Territory (centre), Peter Cosgrove, immediate past Chief of the Defence Force (Australia) (second from right), and Kevin Rudd, Prime Minister of Australia (right).

In 2006 Stanhope became the ACT's longest serving Chief Minister, exceeding the record previously held by Kate Carnell.

On 26 November 2007, following the resignation of the Northern Territory's Clare Martin, Stanhope became Australia's longest-serving incumbent state or territory leader. When Kevin Rudd was sworn in as Prime Minister of Australia on 3 December 2007, replacing John Howard, Stanhope became the country's longest-serving incumbent head of government.

At the 2008 ACT general election, Stanhope led the Labor Party to win sufficient seats to form a minority government, again with a hung parliament. After almost two weeks of deliberations, the Greens chose to support a minority Labor government.

During his time in office, Stanhope also held the office of Attorney-General from 14 November 2001 to 18 April 2006. During this period, he sponsored a significant rewrite of the civil law of the ACT - including the passage of the Civil Law (Wrongs) Act 2002, the Civil Law (Sale of Residential Property) Act 2003 and the Civil Law Property Act 2006.

On 9 May 2011, Stanhope announced his intention to resign as Chief Minister and as a member for Ginninderra. He formally resigned as Chief Minister on 12 May, and as a Member of the Legislative Assembly on 16 May 2011. The casual vacancy in the Assembly, caused by Stanhope's resignation, was filled by Chris Bourke.

== After politics ==
Stanhope accepted a professorial fellowship in the Australia and New Zealand School of Government, based at the University of Canberra, commencing in August 2011.

On 17 August 2012, Stanhope was appointed Administrator of the Indian Ocean Territories (Cocos (Keeling) Islands and Christmas Island) by Governor-General Quentin Bryce. His two-year term ended in October 2014, and he was replaced by Barry Haase.

== See also ==
- First Stanhope Ministry
- Second Stanhope Ministry
- Third Stanhope Ministry

Australian Capital Territory Legislative Assembly
Preceded by Roberta McRae	Member of the Legislative Assembly for Ginninderra; 1998–2011	Succeeded by Chris Bourke
Political offices
Preceded by Wayne Berry	Leader of the Opposition of the Australian Capital Territory; 1998–2001	Succeeded by Gary Humphries
Preceded by Gary Humphries	Chief Minister of the Australian Capital Territory; 2001–2011	Succeeded by Katy Gallagher
Party political offices
Preceded by Wayne Berry	Leader of the Labor Party in the Australian Capital Territory; 1998–2011	Succeeded by Katy Gallagher
Government offices
Preceded by Brian Lacy	Administrator of the Australian Indian Ocean Territories; 2012–2014	Succeeded by Barry Haase
