= Simon Corbell =

Australian politician

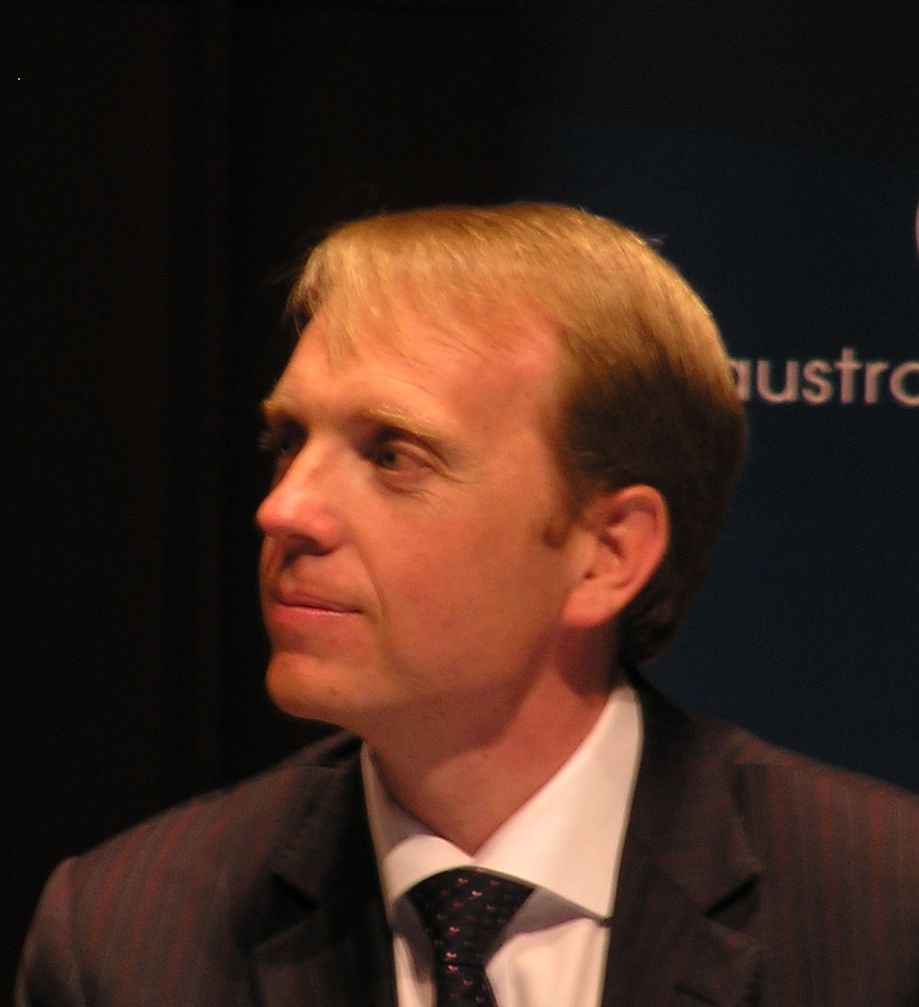
- Corbell at the Make It Count event in 2008

12th Deputy Chief Minister of the Australian Capital Territory
- In office 11 December 2014 – 31 October 2016
- Leader: Andrew Barr
- Preceded by: Andrew Barr
- Succeeded by: Yvette Berry

Deputy Leader of the Australian Labor Party (ACT Branch)
- In office 11 December 2014 – 31 October 2016
- Leader: Andrew Barr
- Preceded by: Andrew Barr
- Succeeded by: Yvette Berry

Attorney-General
- In office 20 April 2006 – 31 October 2016
- Leader: Jon Stanhope; Katy Gallagher; Andrew Barr
- Preceded by: Jon Stanhope
- Succeeded by: Gordon Ramsay

Minister for Health
- In office 20 January 2015 – 31 October 2016
- Leader: Andrew Barr

Minister for the Environment
- In office 16 May 2011 – 31 October 2016
- Leader: Katy Gallagher; Andrew Barr
- Succeeded by: Mick Gentleman

Minister for Capital Metro
- In office 11 December 2014 – 31 October 2016
- Leader: Andrew Barr

Member of the Australian Capital Territory Legislative Assembly for Molonglo
- In office 9 January 1997 – 11 August 2016

Personal details
- Born: 21 November 1970 (age 55)
- Party: Australian Labor Party
- Education: University of Canberra
- Profession: Political advisor

Simon Corbell (born 21 November 1970) is a former Australian politician and Deputy Chief Minister of the Australian Capital Territory. He was also Attorney-General, Minister for Health, Minister for the Environment and Minister for the Capital Metro.

== Early life ==
Corbell grew up in Weston Creek. He attended the local primary and high school before studying at the University of Canberra where he completed a Bachelor of Arts in communication.

Before his election to the Assembly, Corbell worked for John Langmore, the Member for Fraser in the Australian House of Representatives, until Langmore's departure from parliament.

== Political career ==
Corbell was first elected to the Australian Capital Territory Legislative Assembly in 1997 as a member for the electorate of Molonglo in a countback following the resignation of former Chief Minister Rosemary Follett.

As attorney-general, he was involved in the establishment of the Human Rights Act 2004 (ACT) and the Human Rights Commission, and legislating for gay marriage in the ACT after legislation called the Civil Union Act 2006 (of the Australian Capital Territory) was overturned by federal intervention. In 2013, he introduced the bill for the Marriage Equality (Same Sex) Act 2013 (ACT), which the Legislative Assembly passed by a single vote but which was soon overturned in the High Court.

On 14 August 2015, Simon Corbell announced his decision to retire from politics at the 2016 Australian Capital Territory election.

=== List of ministerial positions held in ACT government ===
- Deputy Chief Minister (December 2014 - 31 October 2016)
- Attorney-General (20 April 2006 - 31 October 2016)
- Minister for Health (20 January 2015 - 31 October 2016), (23 December 2002 - 20 April 2006)
- Minister for the Environment and Climate Change (May 2011 -31 October 2016)
- Minister for Capital Metro (December 2014 - 30 June 2016)
- Minister for Police and Emergency Services (December 2015 - 31 October 2016)
- Minister for Education, Youth and Family Services (13 November 2001 - 23 December 2002)
- Minister for Energy (10 November 2008 - 16 May 2011)
- Minister for the Environment, Climate Change and Water (10 November 2008 – 16 May 2011)
- Minister for Industrial Relations (13 November 2001 - 23 December 2002)
- Minister for Planning (13 November 2001 - 17 April 2007)
- Minister for Police and Emergency Services (20 April 2006 - December 2014)
- Minister for Sustainable Development (16 May 2011 - December 2014)
- Minister for Workplace Safety and Industrial Relations (9 November 2012 - July 2014)

== Later career ==
In April 2024, Corbell was appointed chairman of the State Electricity Commission of Victoria.

== See also ==
- Marriage Equality (Same Sex) Act 2013 (ACT)

Australian Capital Territory Legislative Assembly
Preceded by Rosemary Follett	Member of the Legislative Assembly for Molonglo; 1997–2016	Electorate abolished
Political offices
Preceded by Jon Stanhope	ACT Attorney General; 2006–present	Incumbent
Preceded by John Hargreaves	ACT Minister for Police and Emergency Services; 2006–present	Incumbent
Preceded by Himself as Minister for the Environment, Climate Change and Water	ACT Minister for the Environment and Sustainable Development; 2011–present	Incumbent
Preceded by Katy Gallagher as Minister for Industrial Relations	ACT Minister for Workplace Safety and Industrial Relations; 2012–present	Incumbent
Preceded by Jon Stanhope	ACT Minister for Health; 2002–2006	Succeeded by Katy Gallagher
Preceded by Brendan Smyth as Minister for Urban Services	ACT Minister for Planning; 2001–2007	Succeeded by Andrew Barr
Preceded by Jon Stanhope as Minister for the Environment	ACT Minister for the Environment, Climate Change and Water; 2008–2011	Succeeded by Himself as Minister for the Environment and Sustainable Development
Preceded by Bill Stefaniak as Minister for Education	ACT Education, Youth and Family Services; 2001–2002	Succeeded by Katy Gallagher
Preceded by Brendan Smyth as Minister for Business, Tourism and the Arts	ACT Minister for Industrial Relations; 2001–2002	Succeeded by Katy Gallagher
