= Minister for Health (Australian Capital Territory) =

The Minister for Health of the Australian Capital Territory is the head of the ACT Health Directorate and appointed by the Chief Minister of the Australian Capital Territory.

The current Minister for Health is Rachel Stephen-Smith.

== List of ministers for health ==
#	Name	Title	Party	Term start	Term end	Timespan
1	Wayne Berry	Minister for Community Services and Health	Labor	16 May 1989	5 December 1989	203 days
2	Trevor Kaine	Minister for Community Services and Health	Liberal	5 December 1989	13 December 1989	8 days
3	Gary Humphries	Minister for Health, Education and the Arts	Liberal	13 December 1989	6 June 1991	1 year, 175 days
(1)	Wayne Berry	Minister for Health	Labor	6 June 1991	13 April 1994	2 years, 311 days
4	Terry Connolly	Minister for Health	Labor	13 April 1994	15 March 1995	336 days
5	Kate Carnell	Minister for Health and Community Care	Liberal	15 March 1995	31 March 1998	3 years, 16 days
(3)	Gary Humphries	Minister for Health and Community Care	Liberal	31 March 1998	27 April 1998	27 days
6	Michael Moore	Minister for Health and Community Care^{1}	Independent^{2}	27 April 1998	13 November 2001	3 years, 200 days
7	Jon Stanhope	Minister for Health	Labor	13 November 2001	23 December 2002	1 year, 40 days
8	Simon Corbell	Minister for Health	Labor	23 December 2002	20 April 2006	3 years, 118 days
9	Katy Gallagher	Minister for Health	Labor	20 April 2006	11 September 2014	8 years, 144 days
(8)	Simon Corbell	Minister for Health	Labor	11 September 2014	1 November 2016	2 years, 51 days
10	Meegan Fitzharris	Minister for Health	Labor	1 November 2016	1 July 2017	2 years, 242 days
10	Meegan Fitzharris	Minister for Health and Wellbeing	Labor	1 July 2017	1 July 2019	2 years, 242 days
11	Rachel Stephen-Smith	Minister for Health	Labor	1 July 2019	Incumbent	7 years, 54 days

^{1} Ministerial role expanded on 19 October 2000 to include Housing, as well as Health and Community Care. Ministerial role expanded again on 15 December 2000 to include Health, Housing and Community Services.
^{2} Moore sat as an independent member in the Carnell and Humphries led Liberal governments.
