= Deputy Chief Minister of the Australian Capital Territory =

- Coat of arms of the Australian Capital Territory
- Incumbent; Rachel Stephen-Smith since 23 July 2026
- Style: None
- Member of: Legislative Assembly; Cabinet
- Seat: 1 Constitution Avenue, Canberra
- Nominator: Chief Minister of the Australian Capital Territory
- Formation: 16 May 1989
- First holder: Paul Whalan

The Deputy Chief Minister of the Australian Capital Territory is the second-most senior officer in the government of the Australian Capital Territory. The position has been a ministerial portfolio since its establishment in 1989. Unlike in other states and territories, the deputy chief minister of the ACT is not nominally appointed by an administrator or vice-regal, but by the chief minister.

The current deputy chief minister is the Labor Party's Rachel Stephen-Smith who took over from former Labor deputy leader Simon Corbell on 31 October 2016, following Corbell's retirement at the 2016 Australian Capital Territory election.

== History ==
The 1989 ACT election, which was the first under self-government, resulted in Labor emerging as the largest party in the Legislative Assembly with five seats. Following the formation of the inaugural government ministry under chief minister Rosemary Follett, deputy Labor leader Paul Whalan was appointed to the position.

When a no-confidence motion resulted in the end of the Follett government, new chief minister and Liberal Party leader Trevor Kaine briefly held all portfolios after becoming chief minister, before the new ministry was sworn in on 13 December 1988.

There was no deputy chief minister between 29 May 1991 and 18 June 1991 after Kaine sacked the Residents Rally (including its leader, deputy chief minister Bernard Collaery) from the Alliance government. Independents Group leader Craig Duby expected to be elevated to the position, but this never occurred.

Gary Humphries, Katy Gallagher and Andrew Barr are the only deputy chief ministers who have gone on to become chief minister. Trevor Kaine is the only chief minister who has taken a 'backward' step to become deputy chief minister.

== Duties ==
The duties of the deputy chief minister are to act on behalf of the chief minister of the Australian Capital Territory in his or her absence overseas or on leave. The deputy chief minister has always been a member of the Cabinet, and has always held at least one substantive portfolio (it would be technically possible for a minister to hold only the portfolio of deputy chief minister, but this has never happened).

If the chief minister were to die, become incapacitated or resign, the Assembly would normally elect the deputy chief minister as chief minister. If the governing or majority party had not yet elected a new leader, that appointment would be on an interim basis. Should a different leader emerge, that person would then be appointed chief minister.

== List of deputy chief ministers ==
#	Deputy Chief Minister (birth–death)	Party	Term start	Term end	Time in office	Chief Minister (term)
1	Paul Whalan (born 1941)	Labor	16 May 1989	5 December 1989	203 days	Follett (1989–1989)
2	Bernard Collaery (born 1944)	Residents Rally	13 December 1989	29 May 1991	1 year, 167 days	Kaine (1989–1991)
3	Wayne Berry (born 1942)	Labor	18 June 1991	13 April 1994	2 years, 299 days	Follett (1991–1995)
4	David Lamont (born 1953)	Labor	13 April 1994	15 March 1995	336 days	Follett (1991–1995)
5	Tony De Domenico (born 1950)	Liberal	15 March 1995	9 January 1997	1 year, 300 days	Carnell (1995–2000)
6	Gary Humphries (born 1958)	Liberal	9 January 1997	31 January 1997	22 days	Carnell (1995–2000)
7	Trevor Kaine (1928–2009)	Liberal	31 January 1997	17 February 1997	17 days	Carnell (1995–2000)
(6)	Gary Humphries (born 1958)	Liberal	17 February 1997	18 October 2000	3 years, 244 days	Carnell (1995–2000)
8	Brendan Smyth (born 1959)	Liberal	18 October 2000	13 November 2001	1 year, 25 days	Carnell (1995–2000)
9	Ted Quinlan (born 1942)	Labor	13 November 2001	20 April 2006	4 years, 158 days	Stanhope (2001–2011)
10	Katy Gallagher (born 1970)	Labor	20 April 2006	16 May 2011	5 years, 26 days	Stanhope (2001–2011)
11	Andrew Barr (born 1973)	Labor	16 May 2011	11 December 2014	3 years, 209 days	Gallagher (2011–2014)
12	Simon Corbell (born 1970)	Labor	11 December 2014	31 October 2016	1 year, 325 days	Barr (2014–present)
13	Yvette Berry (born 1968)	Labor	31 October 2016	23 July 2026	9 years, 265 days	Barr (2014–present)
14	Rachel Stephen-Smith	Labor	23 July 2026	Incumbent	119 days	Barr (2014–present)

== See also ==
- Chief Minister of the Australian Capital Territory
- List of Australian Capital Territory ministries
