= Attorney-General of the Australian Capital Territory =

Chief law officer for the state of Australian Capital Territory, Australia

- Coat of arms of the Australian Capital Territory

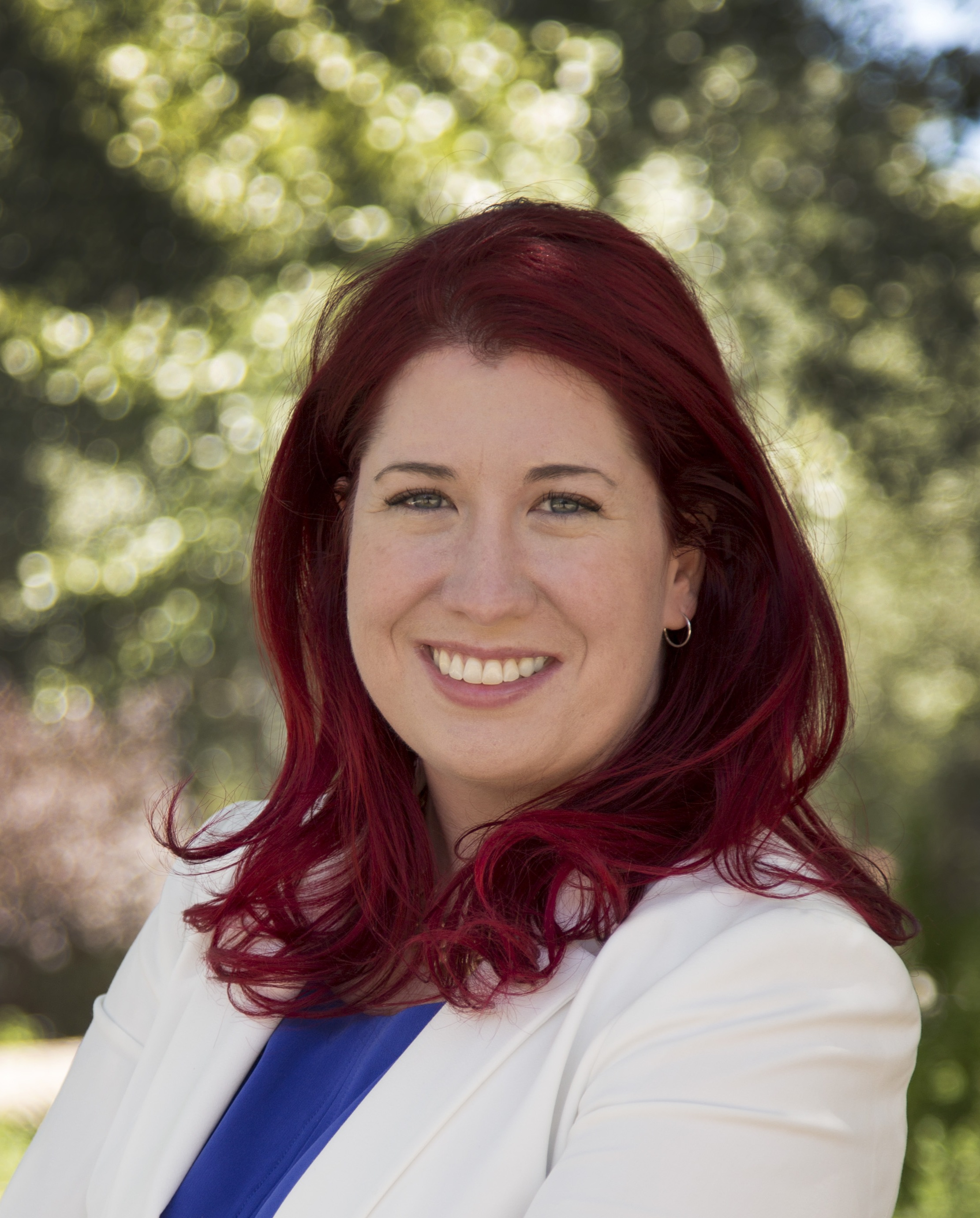
- Incumbent; Tara Cheyne since 8 November 2024
- Justice and Community Safety Directorate
- Style: The Honourable
- Member of: Legislative Assembly; Cabinet
- Reports to: Chief Minister of the Australian Capital Territory
- Seat: Canberra
- Nominator: Chief Minister of the Australian Capital Territory
- Appointer: ACT Legislative Assembly
- Formation: 18 May 1989
- First holder: Rosemary Follett
- Deputy: ACT Government Solicitor
- Website: www.justice.act.gov.au

The Attorney-General of the Australian Capital Territory, in formal contexts also Attorney-General or Attorney General for the Australian Capital Territory, is the primary Law Officer of the Crown in the Australian Capital Territory. The Attorney General serves as the chief legal and constitutional adviser of the ACT Government and is the head of the Justice and Community Safety Directorate. Its constitutional role was established in 1989 with the enactment by the Federal Parliament of the Australian Capital Territory (Self-Government) Act 1988.

Tara Cheyne, MLA, a representative of the ACT Labor Party, became Attorney-General on 8 November 2024.

== List of attorneys-general ==
#	Name	Took office	Left office	Timespan	Party
1	Rosemary Follett	18 May 1989	14 December 1989	210 days	Labor
2	Bernard Collaery	14 December 1989	18 June 1991	1 year, 186 days	Residents Rally
3	Terry Connolly	18 June 1991	17 March 1995	3 years, 272 days	Labor
4	Gary Humphries	17 March 1995	15 December 2000	5 years, 273 days	Liberal
5	Bill Stefaniak	15 December 2000	14 November 2001	334 days	Liberal
6	Jon Stanhope	14 November 2001	18 April 2006	5 years, 158 days	Labor
7	Simon Corbell	18 April 2006	31 October 2016	10 years, 196 days	Labor
8	Gordon Ramsay	31 October 2016	3 November 2020	4 years, 3 days	Labor
9	Shane Rattenbury	4 November 2020	7 November 2024	5 years, 307 days	Greens
10	Tara Cheyne	8 November 2024	incumbent	1 year, 304 days	Labor

== See also ==
- Australian Capital Territory ministries
- Government of the Australian Capital Territory
- Justice ministry
