= Treasurer of the Australian Capital Territory =

- Coat of arms of the Australian Capital Territory

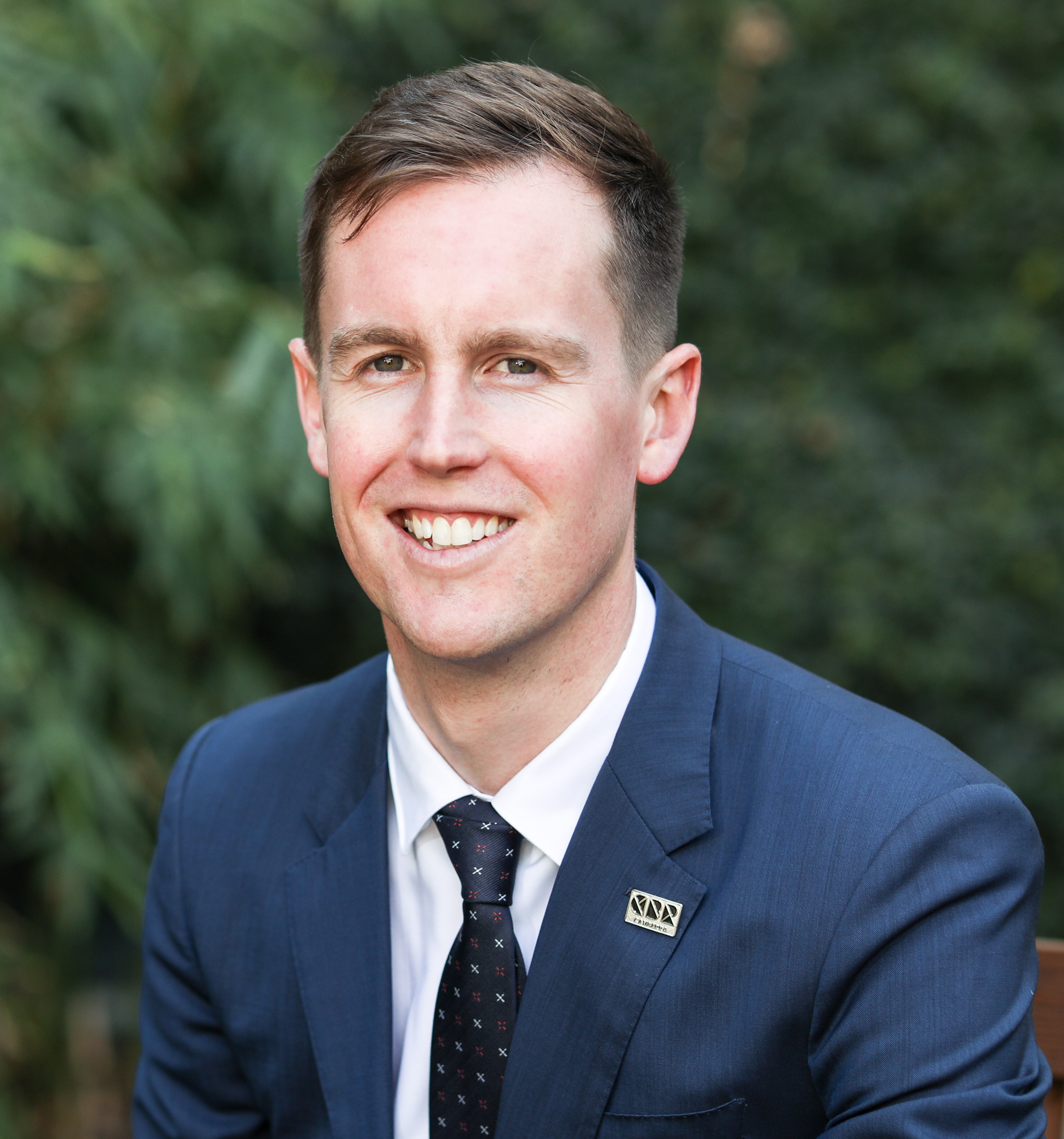
- Incumbent; Chris Steel since 7 November 2024
- Department of Treasury
- Style: The Honourable
- Member of: Legislative Assembly; Cabinet
- Seat: 1 Constitution Avenue, Canberra
- Nominator: Chief Minister of the Australian Capital Territory
- Formation: 16 May 1989
- First holder: Rosemary Follett

The Treasurer of the Australian Capital Territory is the title held by the Cabinet Minister who is responsible for the management of the Government of the Australian Capital Territory's public sector finances, and for preparing and delivering the annual Territory Budget.

The current ACT Treasurer is Chris Steel.

== List of treasurers of the Australian Capital Territory ==
Treasurer	Party	Assumed office	Left office	Term
Rosemary Follett	Labor	16 May 1989	5 December 1989	203 days
Trevor Kaine	Liberal	5 December 1989	6 June 1991	1 year, 183 days
Rosemary Follett	Labor	18 June 1991	15 March 1995	3 years, 270 days
Kate Carnell	Liberal	15 March 1995	7 August 1999	4 years, 145 days
Gary Humphries	Liberal	7 August 1999	13 November 2001	2 years, 98 days
Ted Quinlan	Labor	13 December 2001	20 April 2006	4 years, 128 days
Jon Stanhope	Labor	20 April 2006	11 November 2008	2 years, 205 days
Katy Gallagher	Labor	11 November 2008	30 June 2011	2 years, 231 days
Andrew Barr	Labor	1 July 2011	7 November 2024	13 years, 129 days
Chris Steel	Labor	7 November 2024	Incumbent	1 year, 305 days
