= Government of the Australian Capital Territory =

Australian territorial government

Overview
- Established: 1 January 1911; as a territory; 4 March 1989; with self-government
- Polity: Australian Capital Territory
- Leader: Chief Minister (Andrew Barr)
- Appointed by: Legislative Assembly
- Main organ: Cabinet
- Ministries: 8 government directorates
- Responsible to: Legislative Assembly
- Annual budget: A$8.4 billion (2023–2024)
- Headquarters: 220 London Circuit, Canberra
- Website: act.gov.au

The Government of the Australian Capital Territory, also known as the Australian Capital Territory Government or ACT Government, is the executive branch of the Australian Capital Territory. The leader of the party or coalition that holds the confidence of the Australian Capital Territory Legislative Assembly forms government. Unlike the Australian states and the Northern Territory, the Legislative Assembly directly elects one of its number to serve as Chief Minister as the head of the government, rather than being appointed by a Governor or Administrator.

Since December 2014, the Chief Minister has been Andrew Barr, leader of the Labor Party. Following the 2024 ACT election, Labor formed a minority government of 10 members, after the Greens moved to the crossbench and, dissolving the coalition that had been in place since 2012.

Ministers are appointed by the Chief Minister. The current ministry of the Australian Capital Territory (Fourth Barr Ministry) consists of eight of the 25 members of the Legislative Assembly.

== Constitutional framework ==
The ACT has internal self-government, but Australia's Constitution does not afford the territory government the full legislative independence provided to Australian states. Government for the Australian Capital Territory is outlined in Commonwealth legislation; the Australian Capital Territory (Self-Government) Act 1988. Nonetheless, the ACT is governed according to the principles of the Westminster System, a form of parliamentary government based on the model of the United Kingdom.

Legislative power rests with the unicameral Australian Capital Territory Legislative Assembly.

Executive power rests formally with the executive, which consists of the chief minister and ministers, and is informally called the Cabinet.

Judicial power is exercised by the Supreme Court of the Australian Capital Territory and a system of subordinate courts, but the High Court of Australia and other federal courts have overriding jurisdiction on matters which fall under the ambit of the Australian Constitution.

The ACT does not have a separate system of local government such as that seen in the Australian States and the Northern Territory. In the ACT, government functions that would usually be handled by local government are instead directly handled by the territory government.

== Current ministry ==
The current arrangement of the incumbent ministry (Fourth Barr Ministry) of the ACT was appointed on 27 July 2026, comprising eight Labor Party members. The current arrangement of the incumbent shadow ministry was announced on 4 December 2025, comprising eight Liberal Party members, with a minor reshuffle on 16 April 2026 to add a Men and Men's Health portfolio.

Party	Portrait	Minister	Portfolio	Opposition counterpart	Portfolio	Portrait	Party
Labor		Andrew Barr	Chief Minister; Minister for Trade, Investment and the Knowledge Economy; Minister for Tourism and Events; Minister for Major Projects	Mark Parton MLA	Leader of the Opposition; Shadow Minister for Health and Mental Health (since 16 April 2026); Shadow Minister for Men and Men's Health (since 16 April 2026); Shadow Minister for Transport; Shadow Minister for Gaming and Racing; Shadow Minister for Aboriginal and Torres Strait Islander Affairs		Liberal
Labor		Rachel Stephen-Smith	Deputy Chief Minister; Minister for Education; Minister for Child Development and Wellbeing; Minister for Finance; Minister for the Public Service; Minister for Health Infrastructure	Deborah Morris MLA	Deputy Leader of the Opposition; Shadow Minister for Planning; Shadow Minister for Police, Emergency Services and Community Safety; Shadow Minister for Home Ownership and Housing Affordability; Shadow Minister for Corrections		Liberal
Labor		Marisa Paterson	Minister for Health; Minister for Mental Health; Minister for Police, Fire and Emergency Services; Minister for Gaming Reform	Leanne Castley MLA	Shadow Minister for City Services; Shadow Minister for Women and Women’s Health (since 16 April 2026); Shadow Minister for Prevention of Family and Domestic Violence		Liberal
Labor		Chris Steel	Treasurer; Minister for Planning and Sustainable Development; Minister for Sport and Recreation; Minister for Heritage	Ed Cocks MLA	Shadow Treasurer; Shadow Minister for Private Sector Employment and Industrial Relations; Shadow Minister for Youth Affairs		Liberal
Labor		Tara Cheyne	Manager of Government Business; Attorney-General; Minister for City and Government Services; Minister for Transport	Chiaka Barry MLA	Shadow Attorney-General; Shadow Minister for Social Housing and Homelessness; Shadow Minister for Multicultural Affairs		Liberal
Labor		Suzanne Orr	Minister for Aboriginal and Torres Strait Islander Affairs; Minister for Housing and Homelessness; Minister for Climate Change, Environment, Energy and Water; Minister for Disability, Autism and Neurodiversity; Minister for Equality	Peter Cain MLA	Shadow Minister for Community Services and Disability; Shadow Minister for Government Services; Shadow Minister for Veterans; Shadow Minister for Seniors		Liberal
Labor		Michael Pettersson	Minister for Business and Industry; Minister for Skills, Training and Industrial Relations; Minister for Arts, Creative Industries and the Night-Time Economy; Minister for Children, Youth and Families; Minister for Multicultural Affairs	James Milligan MLA	Shadow Minister for Business Innovation and Economic Development; Shadow Minister for Skills and Vocational Training; Shadow Minister for Sport and Recreation; Shadow Minister for Arts and Creative Industries		Liberal
Labor		Caitlin Tough	Minister for Human Rights; Minister for Community Services; Minister for Corrections; Minister for Women, Seniors and Veterans; Minister for the Prevention of Family and Domestic Violence	Elizabeth Lee MLA	Shadow Minister for Education; Shadow Minister for Environment and Climate Change; Shadow Minister for Tourism and Events		Liberal

== ACT Government directorates ==
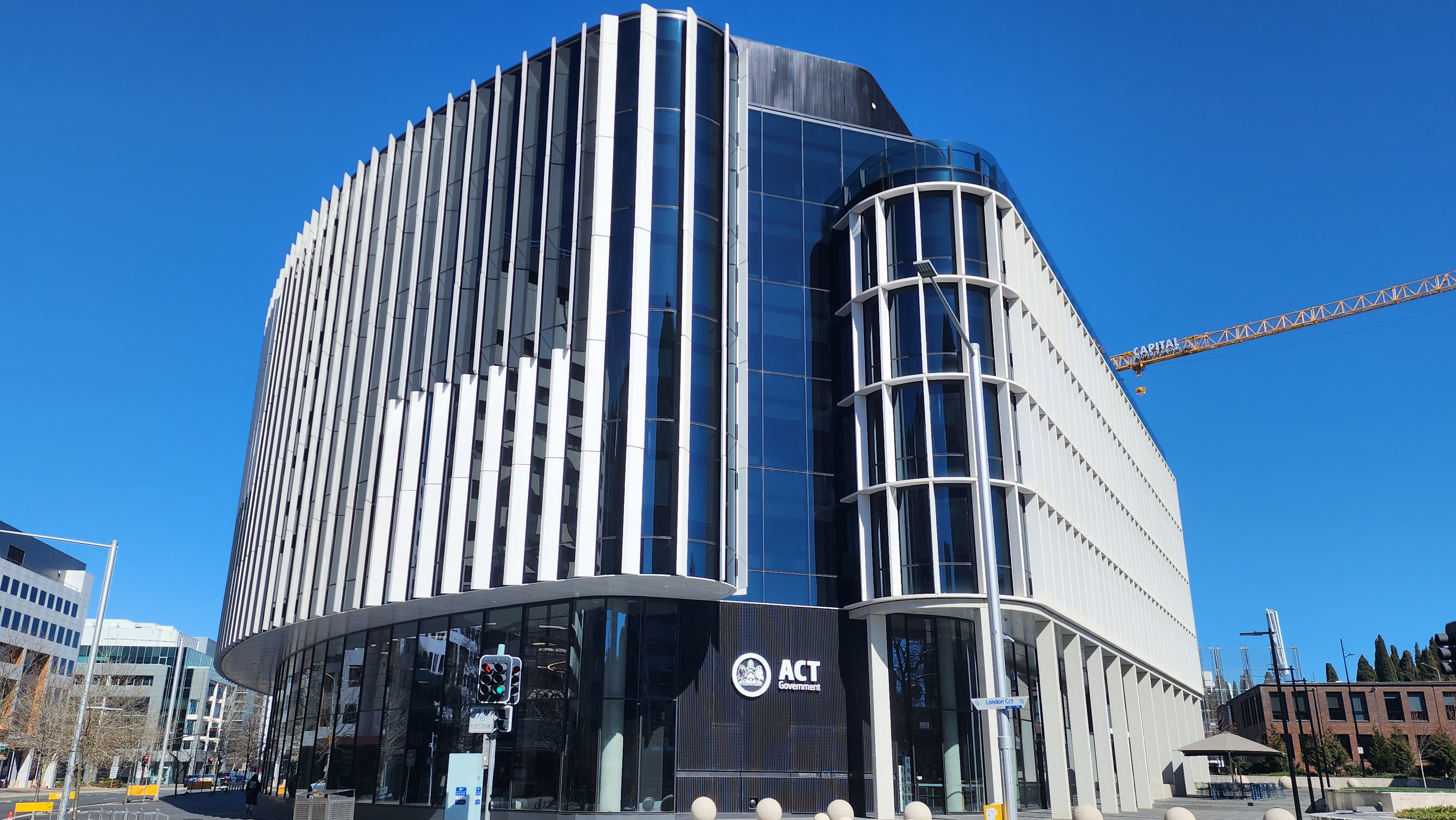
220 London Circuit in Civic, which houses the main offices of the ACT Government

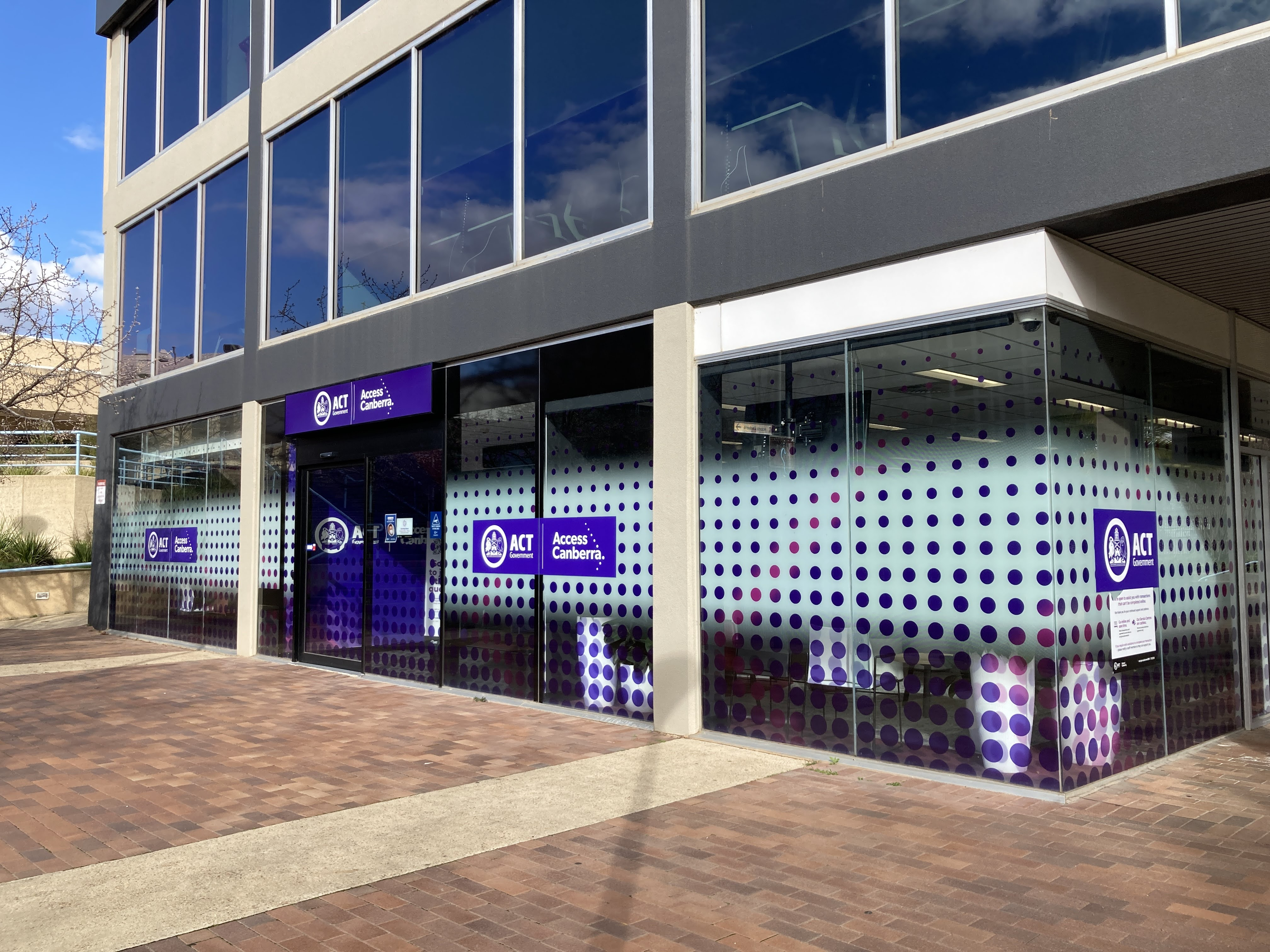
The Access Canberra service centre in Belconnen

The ACT Government is served by a unified ACT Public Service agency, reporting to a single Head of Service.

Administrative units, known as directorates, are grouped under areas of portfolio responsibility. Each directorate is led by a director-general who reports to one or more ministers.

As of July 2025, there are eight directorates:

- Canberra Health Services
- Chief Minister, Treasury and Economic Development Directorate (CMTEDD)
- City and Environment Directorate
- Digital Canberra
- Education Directorate
- Health and Community Services Directorate
- Justice and Community Safety Directorate
- Infrastructure Canberra

=== Agencies and authorities ===
- City Renewal Authority
- Suburban Land Agency

=== Independent authorities ===
- Independent Competition and Regulatory Commission
- Office of the Work Health and Safety Commissioner

=== Public authorities and territory-owned corporations ===
The ACT Government also has a number of public authorities and territory-owned corporations:

- ACT Building & Construction Industry Training Fund Board: providing funding for the training of eligible workers in the ACT building and construction industry.
- ACT Long Service Leave Authority: administers portable long service leave schemes.
- ACT Teacher Quality Institute: an independent statutory authority established to build the professional standing of ACT teachers and to enhance the community's confidence in the teaching profession through professional regulation and practical initiatives to raise teacher quality.
- Canberra Institute of Technology (CIT) is the ACT Government operated vocational educational provider.
- Cultural Facilities Corporation: manages the Canberra Theatre Centre; the Canberra Museum and Gallery (CMAG).
- EvoEnergy: owns and operates the ACT electricity and gas networks as well as gas networks in Queanbeyan and Palerang shires and Nowra.
- Icon Water Limited: providing drinking water and wastewater services to the ACT and surrounding regions.

The following are officers of the Australian Capital Territory Legislative Assembly:

- ACT Audit Office: responsible for the audit of all ACT public sector agencies.
- ACT Electoral Commission: an independent statutory authority responsible for conducting elections and referendums for the Legislative Assembly.
- ACT Integrity Commission: responsible for investigating alleged corrupt conduct in the Legislative Assembly and the ACT Public Sector.
- ACT Ombudsman: manages complaints about unfair treatment by ACT Government agencies.

== See also ==
- Australian Capital Territory Legislative Assembly
- Australian Capital Territory Ministry
- List of Australian Capital Territory ministries
