= Electoral results for the district of Hampden =

Australian district election results

This is a list of electoral results for the electoral district of Hampden in Victorian state elections.

== Members for Hampden ==
Member	Party	Term
David Oman	Commonwealth Liberal	1904–1927
David Oman	Nationalist	1904–1927
Arthur Hughes	Labor	1927–1929
Chester Manifold	Nationalist	1929–1935
Chester Manifold	United Australia	1929–1935
William Cumming	United Australia	1935–1945
Raymond Hyatt	Labor	1945–1947
Henry Bolte	Liberal / LCP ^{[a]}	1947–1972
Tom Austin	Liberal	1972–1976

== Election results ==
=== Elections in the 1970s ===
1973 Victorian state election: Hampden
Party	Candidate	Votes	%	±%
Liberal	Tom Austin	7,948	44.4	+1.5
Labor	Raymond Blizzard	6,309	35.3	+4.2
Country	Alan Plant	2,491	13.9	−2.3
Democratic Labor	Francis O'Brien	1,132	6.3	−3.5
Total formal votes		17,880	98.9	+0.6
Informal votes		196	1.1	−0.6
Turnout		18,076	95.7	−0.4
Two-party-preferred result
Liberal	Tom Austin	11,086	62.0	−3.8
Labor	Raymond Blizzard	6,794	38.0	+3.8
Liberal hold		Swing	−3.8	

1972 Hampden state by-election
Party	Candidate	Votes	%	±%
Labor	Raymond Blizzard	5,872	36.6	+5.5
Liberal	Tom Austin	5,616	35.0	−7.9
Country	Alan Plant	3,278	20.4	+4.2
Democratic Labor	Francis O'Brien	1,113	6.9	−2.9
Independent	I T Maddern	172	1.1	+1.1
Total formal votes		16,051	98.8	+0.5
Informal votes		191	1.2	−0.5
Turnout		16,242	91.6	−4.5
Two-party-preferred result
Liberal	Tom Austin	9,672	60.3	−5.5
Labor	Raymond Blizzard	6,379	39.7	+5.5
Liberal hold		Swing	−5.5	

1970 Victorian state election: Hampden
Party	Candidate	Votes	%	±%
Liberal	Henry Bolte	7,292	42.9	−1.7
Labor	Vincent Ayres	5,288	31.1	+6.3
Country	Gilbert Anderson	2,746	16.2	−0.8
Democratic Labor	Francis O'Brien	1,668	9.8	+0.2
Total formal votes		16,994	98.3	+1.2
Informal votes		295	1.7	−1.2
Turnout		17,289	96.1	−0.5
Two-party-preferred result
Liberal	Henry Bolte	11,181	65.8	−6.0
Labor	Vincent Ayres	5,813	34.2	+6.0
Liberal hold		Swing	−6.0	

=== Elections in the 1960s ===
1967 Victorian state election: Hampden
Party	Candidate	Votes	%	±%
Liberal	Henry Bolte	7,564	44.6	−9.1
Labor	Fred Rowe	4,201	24.8	−5.9
Country	Gilbert Anderson	2,876	17.0	+14.5
Democratic Labor	Francis O'Brien	1,629	9.6	−3.4
Liberal Reform Group	Ian McQuie	491	2.9	+2.9
Independent	Glynne Wheler	186	1.1	+1.1
Total formal votes		16,947	97.1	
Informal votes		508	2.9	
Turnout		17,455	96.6	
Two-party-preferred result
Liberal	Henry Bolte	12,164	71.8	+5.0
Labor	Fred Rowe	4,783	28.2	−5.0
Liberal hold		Swing	+5.0	

1964 Victorian state election: Hampden
Party	Candidate	Votes	%	±%
Liberal and Country	Henry Bolte	11,538	57.2	+4.9
Labor	Arthur Solly	5,539	27.5	−2.8
Democratic Labor	Francis O'Brien	3,100	15.4	−2.0
Total formal votes		20,177	99.0	+0.1
Informal votes		206	1.0	−0.1
Turnout		20,383	96.4	0.0
Two-party-preferred result
Liberal and Country	Henry Bolte	14,173	70.2	+3.1
Labor	Arthur Solly	6,004	29.8	−3.1
Liberal and Country hold		Swing	+3.1	

1961 Victorian state election: Hampden
Party	Candidate	Votes	%	±%
Liberal and Country	Henry Bolte	10,442	52.3	−6.1
Labor	George Price	6,058	30.3	+3.4
Democratic Labor	Francis O'Brien	3,480	17.4	+2.7
Total formal votes		19,980	98.9	−0.2
Informal votes		231	1.1	+0.2
Turnout		20,211	96.4	−0.2
Two-party-preferred result
Liberal and Country	Henry Bolte	13,400	67.1	−3.8
Labor	George Price	6,580	32.9	+3.8
Liberal and Country hold		Swing	−3.8	

=== Elections in the 1950s ===
1958 Victorian state election: Hampden
Party	Candidate	Votes	%	±%
Liberal and Country	Henry Bolte	11,648	58.4	
Labor	Fred Levin	5,367	26.9	
Democratic Labor	Leo O'Brien	2,944	14.7	
Total formal votes		19,959	99.1	
Informal votes		175	0.9	
Turnout		20,134	96.6	
Two-party-preferred result
Liberal and Country	Henry Bolte	14,151	70.9	
Labor	Fred Levin	5,808	29.1	
Liberal and Country hold		Swing		

- Two party preferred vote was estimated.

1955 Victorian state election: Hampden
Party	Candidate	Votes	%	±%
Liberal and Country	Henry Bolte	10,968	58.7	
Labor	Ernie Morton	7,703	41.3	
Total formal votes		18,671	98.8	
Informal votes		231	1.2	
Turnout		18,902	96.2	
Liberal and Country hold		Swing		

1952 Victorian state election: Hampden
Party	Candidate	Votes	%	±%
Labor	Robert Balcombe	6,703	48.0	+5.2
Liberal and Country	Henry Bolte	6,358	45.6	−11.6
Independent	Keith McGarvie	891	6.4	+6.4
Total formal votes		13,952	98.6	−0.5
Informal votes		192	1.4	+0.5
Turnout		14,144	94.7	−0.7
Two-party-preferred result
Liberal and Country	Henry Bolte	7,012	50.3	−6.9
Labor	Robert Balcombe	6,940	49.7	+6.9
Liberal and Country hold		Swing	−6.9	

1950 Victorian state election: Hampden
Party	Candidate	Votes	%	±%
Liberal and Country	Henry Bolte	7,830	57.2	+7.3
Labor	Patrick Denigan	5,856	42.8	+0.9
Total formal votes		13,686	99.1	−0.2
Informal votes		127	0.9	+0.2
Turnout		13,813	95.4	+0.4
Liberal and Country hold		Swing	+0.5	

=== Elections in the 1940s ===
1947 Victorian state election: Hampden
Party	Candidate	Votes	%	±%
Liberal	Henry Bolte	6,796	49.9	+31.2
Labor	Raymond Hyatt	5,700	41.9	−2.1
Independent Country	Alfred Matthey	1,114	8.2	+8.2
Total formal votes		13,610	99.3	+1.3
Informal votes		93	0.7	−1.3
Turnout		13,703	95.0	+5.3
Two-party-preferred result
Liberal	Henry Bolte	7,722	56.7	+9.1
Labor	Raymond Hyatt	5,888	43.3	−9.1
Liberal gain from Labor		Swing	+9.1	

1945 Victorian state election: Hampden
Party	Candidate	Votes	%	±%
Labor	Raymond Hyatt	5,458	44.0	
Country	Harold McLennan	2,417	19.5	
Liberal	Henry Bolte	2,317	18.7	
Ministerial Liberal	William Cumming	2,224	17.9	
Total formal votes		12,416	98.0	
Informal votes		254	2.0	
Turnout		12,670	89.7	
Two-party-preferred result
Labor	Raymond Hyatt	6,506	52.4	
Liberal	Henry Bolte	5,910	47.6	
Labor gain from Liberal		Swing		

1943 Victorian state election: Hampden
Party	Candidate	Votes	%	±%
United Australia	William Cumming	5,617	61.0	+12.4
Labor	Walter Kervin	3,591	39.0	+6.4
Total formal votes		9,208	99.1	+0.4
Informal votes		79	0.9	−0.4
Turnout		9,287	86.5	−8.4
United Australia hold		Swing	−1.3	

1940 Victorian state election: Hampden
Party	Candidate	Votes	%	±%
United Australia	William Cumming	5,045	48.6	+5.6
Labor	Walter Kervin	3,382	32.6	+0.3
Country	Thomas Moore	1,957	18.9	−5.8
Total formal votes		10,384	98.7	−0.4
Informal votes		138	1.3	+0.4
Turnout		10,522	94.9	0.0
Two-party-preferred result
United Australia	William Cumming	6,197	59.7	+0.6
Labor	Walter Kervin	4,187	40.3	−0.6
United Australia hold		Swing	+0.6	

=== Elections in the 1930s ===
1937 Victorian state election: Hampden
Party	Candidate	Votes	%	±%
United Australia	William Cumming	4,516	43.0	+10.1
Labor	Michael Nolan	3,394	32.3	−5.7
Country	Thomas Moore	2,599	24.7	+24.7
Total formal votes		10,509	99.1	+0.2
Informal votes		92	0.9	−0.2
Turnout		10,601	94.9	0.0
Two-party-preferred result
United Australia	William Cumming	6,219	59.1	+1.3
Labor	Michael Nolan	4,290	40.9	−1.3
United Australia hold		Swing	+1.3	

1935 Victorian state election: Hampden
Party	Candidate	Votes	%	±%
Labor	Harry McCorkell	3,977	38.0	+38.0
United Australia	William Cumming	3,439	32.9	−67.1
United Australia	Roderick McRae	3,042	29.1	+29.1
Total formal votes		10,458	98.9	
Informal votes		113	1.1	
Turnout		10,571	94.9	
Two-party-preferred result
United Australia	William Cumming	6,045	57.8	−42.2
Labor	Harry McCorkell	4,413	42.2	+42.2
United Australia hold		Swing	N/A	

1932 Victorian state election: Hampden
Party	Candidate	Votes	%	±%
United Australia	Thomas Manifold	unopposed		
United Australia hold		Swing		

=== Elections in the 1920s ===
1929 Victorian state election: Hampden
Party	Candidate	Votes	%	±%
Nationalist	Chester Manifold	5,336	52.6	+6.2
Labor	Arthur Hughes	4,811	47.4	−6.2
Total formal votes		10,147	99.4	+0.4
Informal votes		65	0.6	−0.4
Turnout		10,212	95.4	+3.1
Nationalist gain from Labor		Swing	+6.2	

1927 Victorian state election: Hampden
Party	Candidate	Votes	%	±%
Labor	Arthur Hughes	5,071	53.6	
Nationalist	David Oman	4,396	46.4	
Total formal votes		9,467	99.0	
Informal votes		96	1.0	
Turnout		9,563	92.3	
Labor gain from Nationalist		Swing		

1924 Victorian state election: Hampden
Party	Candidate	Votes	%	±%
Nationalist	David Oman	3,860	60.6	+5.4
Labor	John Coustley	2,509	39.4	+12.7
Total formal votes		6,369	99.3	+0.8
Informal votes		45	0.7	−0.8
Turnout		6,414	55.4	−5.3
Nationalist hold		Swing	−8.2	

1921 Victorian state election: Hampden
Party	Candidate	Votes	%	±%
Nationalist	David Oman	3,743	55.2	−5.7
Labor	Hugh Meagher	1,812	26.7	+26.7
Victorian Farmers	Martin Brennan	1,231	18.1	−21.0
Total formal votes		6,786	98.5	+4.1
Informal votes		107	1.5	−4.1
Turnout		6,893	60.7	−0.4
Two-party-preferred result
Nationalist	David Oman		68.8	
Labor	Hugh Meagher		31.2	
Nationalist hold		Swing	N/A	

- Two party preferred vote was estimated.

1920 Victorian state election: Hampden
Party	Candidate	Votes	%	±%
Nationalist	David Oman	3,992	60.9	−2.1
Victorian Farmers	George Hucker	2,561	39.1	+39.1
Total formal votes		6,553	94.4	−0.9
Informal votes		390	5.6	+0.9
Turnout		6,943	61.1	+5.1
Nationalist hold		Swing	N/A	

=== Elections in the 1910s ===
1917 Victorian state election: Hampden
Party	Candidate	Votes	%	±%
Nationalist	David Oman	3,889	63.0	+2.9
Labor	Patrick McMahon	2,283	37.0	−2.9
Total formal votes		6,172	95.3	−2.2
Informal votes		307	4.7	+2.2
Turnout		6,479	56.0	−3.7
Nationalist hold		Swing	+2.9	

1914 Victorian state election: Hampden
Party	Candidate	Votes	%	±%
Liberal	David Oman	4,296	60.1	+7.3
Labor	Patrick McMahon	2,850	39.9	0.0
Total formal votes		7,146	97.5	−1.4
Informal votes		183	2.5	+1.4
Turnout		7,329	59.7	−7.3
Liberal hold		Swing	+0.7	

1911 Victorian state election: Hampden
Party	Candidate	Votes	%	±%
Liberal	David Oman	3,853	52.8	−8.2
Labor	Charles Cairns	2,906	39.9	+0.9
Independent Liberal	Archibald Hannah	532	7.3	+7.3
Total formal votes		7,291	98.9	−0.6
Informal votes		85	1.1	+0.6
Turnout		7,376	67.0	+16.7
Two-party-preferred result
Liberal	David Oman		59.4	−1.6
Labor	Charles Cairns		40.6	+1.6
Liberal hold		Swing	−1.6	

- Two party preferred vote was estimated.
