= Electoral results for the district of Warrenheip =

Australian district election results

This is a list of electoral results for the electoral district of Warrenheip in Victorian state elections.

== Members for Warrenheip ==
Member	Party	Term
Edward Murphy	none	1889–1900
George Holden	none	1900–1913
Edmond Hogan	Labor	1913–1927

== Election results ==
=== Elections in the 1920s ===
1924 Victorian state election: Warrenheip
Party	Candidate	Votes	%	±%
Labor	Edmond Hogan	unopposed		
Labor hold		Swing		

1921 Victorian state election: Warrenheip
Party	Candidate	Votes	%	±%
Labor	Edmond Hogan	2,325	63.6	−36.4
Nationalist	James Ryan	1,330	36.4	+36.4
Total formal votes		3,655	98.8	
Informal votes		44	1.2	
Turnout		3,699	65.4	
Labor hold		Swing	N/A	

1920 Victorian state election: Warrenheip
Party	Candidate	Votes	%	±%
Labor	Edmond Hogan	unopposed		
Labor hold		Swing		

=== Elections in the 1910s ===
1917 Victorian state election: Warrenheip
Party	Candidate	Votes	%	±%
Labor	Edmond Hogan	2,426	62.4	+9.4
Nationalist	Garnett Durham	1,460	37.6	−9.4
Total formal votes		3,886	98.1	+0.6
Informal votes		76	1.9	−0.6
Turnout		3,962	62.4	−10.2
Labor hold		Swing	+9.4	

1914 Victorian state election: Warrenheip
Party	Candidate	Votes	%	±%
Labor	Edmond Hogan	2,327	53.0	+15.4
Liberal	William Clark	2,062	47.0	−15.4
Total formal votes		4,389	97.5	−1.2
Informal votes		115	2.5	+1.2
Turnout		4,504	72.6	+9.5
Labor gain from Liberal		Swing	+15.4	

1911 Victorian state election: Warrenheip
Party	Candidate	Votes	%	±%
Liberal	George Holden	2,252	62.4	+8.5
Labor	Daniel McNamara	1,357	37.6	+14.5
Total formal votes		3,609	98.7	−1.0
Informal votes		49	1.3	+1.0
Turnout		3,658	63.1	+2.2
Liberal hold		Swing	N/A	
