= Electoral results for the district of Warrenheip and Grenville =

Australian district election results

This is a list of electoral results for the electoral district of Warrenheip and Grenville in Victorian state elections.

== Members for Warrenheip and Grenville ==
| Member | Party | Term |
|---|---|---|
| Edmond Hogan | Labor Party | 1927–1932 |
| Edmond Hogan | Independent | 1932–1935 |
| Edmond Hogan | United Country Party | 1935–1943 |
| Raymond Hyatt | Labor Party | 1943–1945 |

== Election results ==
=== Elections in the 1940s ===
1943 Victorian state election: Warrenheip and Grenville
| Party | Candidate | Votes | % | ±% |
|---|---|---|---|---|
| Labor | Raymond Hyatt | 3,263 | 36.5 | +36.5 |
| Country | Edmond Hogan | 3,256 | 36.4 | −15.3 |
| Independent | Albert Woodward | 2,428 | 27.1 | −8.0 |
| Total formal votes | | 8,947 | 98.4 | +0.2 |
| Informal votes | | 145 | 1.6 | −0.2 |
| Turnout | | 9,092 | 89.8 | −4.6 |
Two-party-preferred result
| Labor | Raymond Hyatt | 4,987 | 55.7 | |
| Country | Edmond Hogan | 3,960 | 44.3 | |
| Labor gain from Country | | Swing | N/A | |

1940 Victorian state election: Warrenheip and Grenville
| Party | Candidate | Votes | % | ±% |
|---|---|---|---|---|
| Country | Edmund Hogan | 4,981 | 51.7 | −4.4 |
| Independent | Albert Woodward | 3,379 | 35.1 | +35.1 |
| Independent | James Ryan | 1,278 | 13.3 | +13.3 |
| Total formal votes | | 9,638 | 98.2 | +0.6 |
| Informal votes | | 175 | 1.8 | −0.6 |
| Turnout | | 9,813 | 94.4 | −1.1 |
Two-candidate-preferred result
| Country | Edmund Hogan | | 55.0 | −1.1 |
| Independent | Albert Woodward | | 45.0 | +45.0 |
| Country hold | | Swing | N/A | |

- Two candidate preferred vote was estimated.

=== Elections in the 1930s ===
1937 Victorian state election: Warrenheip and Grenville
| Party | Candidate | Votes | % | ±% |
|---|---|---|---|---|
| Country | Edmond Hogan | 5,560 | 56.1 | +56.1 |
| United Australia | Fred Edmunds | 4,356 | 43.9 | +43.9 |
| Total formal votes | | 9,916 | 97.6 | −0.5 |
| Informal votes | | 244 | 2.4 | +0.5 |
| Turnout | | 10,160 | 95.5 | +0.7 |
| Country gain from Independent | | Swing | N/A | |

1935 Victorian state election: Warrenheip and Grenville
| Party | Candidate | Votes | % | ±% |
|---|---|---|---|---|
| Independent Labor | Edmond Hogan | 5,578 | 55.9 | −44.1 |
| Labor | Ernest Kent | 4,404 | 44.1 | +44.1 |
| Total formal votes | | 9,982 | 98.1 | |
| Informal votes | | 195 | 1.9 | |
| Turnout | | 10,177 | 94.8 | |
| Independent Labor hold | | Swing | | |

1932 Victorian state election: Warrenheip and Grenville
| Party | Candidate | Votes | % | ±% |
|---|---|---|---|---|
| Premiers' Plan Labor | Edmond Hogan | unopposed | | |
| Premiers' Plan Labor gain from Labor | | Swing | N/A | |

=== Elections in the 1920s ===
1929 Victorian state election: Warrenheip and Grenville
| Party | Candidate | Votes | % | ±% |
|---|---|---|---|---|
| Labor | Edmond Hogan | 5,609 | 60.0 | +1.7 |
| Nationalist | Tom Hartrey | 3,739 | 40.0 | −1.7 |
| Total formal votes | | 9,348 | 99.2 | 0.0 |
| Informal votes | | 73 | 0.8 | 0.0 |
| Turnout | | 9,421 | 96.8 | +1.7 |
| Labor hold | | Swing | +1.7 | |

1927 Victorian state election: Warrenheip and Grenville
| Party | Candidate | Votes | % | ±% |
|---|---|---|---|---|
| Labor | Edmond Hogan | 5,359 | 58.3 | |
| Nationalist | Robert McGregor | 3,828 | 41.7 | |
| Total formal votes | | 9,187 | 99.2 | |
| Informal votes | | 78 | 0.8 | |
| Turnout | | 9,265 | 95.1 | |
| Labor hold | | Swing | | |
