= List of premiers of Victoria by time in office =

This is a list of premiers of Victoria by time in office. The basis of the list is the inclusive number of years and days between dates.

== Rank by time in office ==
Parties

Labor Liberal / Liberal & Country Country Nationalists / Deakinite Liberal / United Australia / Non-Party Conservatism Non-Party Liberalism

Rank	No.	Officeholder	Portrait	Party	District	Assumed office	Left office	Time in office (term)	Time in office (total)	Election wins
1.	38th	Sir Henry Bolte (1908–1990)		Liberal & Country / Liberal	MLA for Hampden (1947–1972)	7 June 1955	23 August 1972	17 years, 77 days		1955 1958; 1961 1964; 1967 1970
2.	33rd	Sir Albert Dunstan (1882–1950)		Country	MLA for Korong and Eaglehawk (1927–1945)	2 April 1935	14 September 1943	8 years, 165 days	10 years, 179 days	1937 1940; 1943
2.	33rd	Sir Albert Dunstan (1882–1950)		Country	MLA for Korong and Eaglehawk (1927–1945)	18 September 1943	2 October 1945	2 years, 14 days	10 years, 179 days	1937 1940; 1943
3.	5th	Sir James McCulloch (1819–1893)		No Party Alignment	MLA for Mornington (1862–1872); Warrnambool (1874–1878)	27 June 1863	6 May 1868	4 years, 314 days	8 years, 304 days	1864 1866; 1868
3.	5th	Sir James McCulloch (1819–1893)		No Party Alignment	MLA for Mornington (1862–1872); Warrnambool (1874–1878)	11 July 1868	20 September 1869	1 year, 71 days	8 years, 304 days	1864 1866; 1868
3.	5th	Sir James McCulloch (1819–1893)		No Party Alignment	MLA for Mornington (1862–1872); Warrnambool (1874–1878)	9 April 1870	19 June 1871	1 year, 71 days	8 years, 304 days	1864 1866; 1868
3.	5th	Sir James McCulloch (1819–1893)		No Party Alignment	MLA for Mornington (1862–1872); Warrnambool (1874–1878)	20 October 1875	21 May 1877	1 year, 213 days	8 years, 304 days	1864 1866; 1868
4.	48th	Daniel Andrews (1972– )		Labor	MLA for Mulgrave (2002–2023)	4 December 2014	27 September 2023	8 years, 297 days		2014 2018 2022
5.	39th	Sir Rupert Hamer (1916–2004)		Liberal	MLA for Kew (1971–1981)	23 August 1972	5 June 1981	8 years, 286 days		1973 1976; 1979
6.	41st	John Cain Jr. (1931–2019)		Labor	MLA for Bundoora (1976–1992)	8 April 1982	10 August 1990	8 years, 124 days		1982 1985; 1988
7.	44th	Steve Bracks (1954– )		Labor	MLA for Williamstown (1994–2007)	19 October 1999	30 July 2007	7 years, 284 days		1999 2002; 2006
8.	43rd	Jeff Kennett (1948– )		Liberal	MLA for Burwood (1976–1999)	6 October 1992	19 October 1999	7 years, 13 days		1992 1996
9.	27th	Sir Harry Lawson (1875–1952)		Nationalist	MLA for Castlemaine and Maldon (1904–1927)	21 March 1918	28 April 1924	6 years, 39 days		1920 1921
10.	18th	Sir George Turner (1851–1916)		Non-Party; Liberalism	MLA for St Kilda (1889–1901)	27 September 1894	5 December 1899	5 years, 69 days	5 years, 154 days	1894 1897; 1900
10.	18th	Sir George Turner (1851–1916)		Non-Party; Liberalism	MLA for St Kilda (1889–1901)	19 November 1900	12 February 1901	85 days	5 years, 154 days	1894 1897; 1900
11.	20th	Sir Alexander Peacock (1861–1933)		Non-Party; Liberalism	MLA for Clunes and Allandale (1889–1904)	12 February 1901	10 June 1902	1 year, 118 days	4 years, 363 days	1914
11.	20th	Sir Alexander Peacock (1861–1933)		Commonwealth Liberal	MLA for Allandale (1904–1933)	18 June 1914	29 November 1917	3 years, 164 days	4 years, 363 days	1914
11.	20th	Sir Alexander Peacock (1861–1933)		Nationalist	MLA for Allandale (1904–1933)	18 June 1914	29 November 1917	3 years, 164 days	4 years, 363 days	1914
11.	20th	Sir Alexander Peacock (1861–1933)		Nationalist	MLA for Allandale (1904–1933)	28 April 1924	18 July 1924	81 days	4 years, 363 days	1914
12.	22nd	Sir Thomas Bent (1838–1909)		Non-Party; Conservatism (Electoral Reform)	MLA for Brighton (1900–1909)	16 February 1904	8 January 1909	4 years, 327 days		1904 1907; 1908
13.	14th	Duncan Gillies (1834–1903)		Non-Party; Conservatism	MLA for Rodney (1877–1889); Eastern Suburbs (1889–1894)	18 February 1886	5 November 1890	4 years, 260 days		1886 1889
14.	34th	John Cain Snr. (1882–1957)		Labor	MLA for Northcote (1927–1957)	14 September 1943	18 September 1943	4 days	4 years, 175 days	1945 1952
14.	34th	John Cain Snr. (1882–1957)		Labor	MLA for Northcote (1927–1957)	21 November 1945	20 November 1947	1 year, 364 days	4 years, 175 days	1945 1952
14.	34th	John Cain Snr. (1882–1957)		Labor	MLA for Northcote (1927–1957)	17 December 1952	7 June 1955	2 years, 172 days	4 years, 175 days	1945 1952
15.	30th	Edmond Hogan (1883–1964)		Labor	MLA for Warrenheip and Grenville (1927–1945)	20 May 1927	22 November 1928	1 year, 192 days	3 years, 345 days	1927 1929
15.	30th	Edmond Hogan (1883–1964)		Labor	MLA for Warrenheip and Grenville (1927–1945)	12 December 1929	19 May 1932	2 years, 159 days	3 years, 345 days	1927 1929
16.	11th	Sir Graham Berry (1822–1904)		No Party Alignment	MLA for Geelong West (1869–1877)	7 August 1875	20 October 1875	74 days	3 years, 338 days	1877
16.	11th	Sir Graham Berry (1822–1904)		No Party Alignment	MLA for Geelong (1877–1886)	21 May 1877	5 March 1880	2 years, 289 days	3 years, 338 days	1877
16.	11th	Sir Graham Berry (1822–1904)		No Party Alignment	MLA for Geelong (1877–1886)	3 August 1880	9 July 1881	340 days	3 years, 338 days	1877
17.	2nd	Sir John O'Shanassy (1818–1883)		No Party Alignment	MLA for Kilmore (1856–1865)	11 March 1857	29 April 1857	49 days	3 years, 140 days	1861
17.	2nd	Sir John O'Shanassy (1818–1883)		No Party Alignment	MLA for Kilmore (1856–1865)	10 March 1858	27 October 1859	1 year, 231 days	3 years, 140 days	1861
17.	2nd	Sir John O'Shanassy (1818–1883)		No Party Alignment	MLA for Kilmore (1856–1865)	14 November 1861	27 June 1863	1 year, 225 days	3 years, 140 days	1861
18.	12th	James Service (1823–1899)		No Party Alignment	MLA for Maldon (1874–1881)	5 March 1880	3 August 1880	151 days	3 years, 133 days	1883
18.	12th	James Service (1823–1899)		No Party Alignment	MLA for Castlemaine (1883–1886)	8 March 1883	18 February 1886	2 years, 347 days	3 years, 133 days	1883
19.	45th	John Brumby (1953– )		Labor	MLA for Broadmeadows (1993–2011)	30 July 2007	2 December 2010	3 years, 125 days		
20.	23rd	John Murray (1851–1916)		Commonwealth Liberal	MLA for Warrnambool (1884–1916)	8 January 1909	18 May 1912	3 years, 125 days		1911
21.	32nd	Sir Stanley Argyle (1867–1940)		United Australia	MLA for Toorak (1920–1940)	19 May 1932	2 April 1935	2 years, 318 days		1932 1935
22.	49th	Jacinta Allan (1973–)		Labor	MLA for Bendigo East (1999–)	27 September 2023	28 July 2026	2 years, 304 days		
23.	36th	Thomas Hollway (1906–1971)		Liberal / Liberal & Country	MLA for Ballarat (1932–1952)	20 November 1947	27 June 1950	2 years, 219 days	2 years, 222 days	1947 1950
23.	36th	Thomas Hollway (1906–1971)		Electoral Reform	MLA for Ballarat (1932–1952)	28 October 1952	31 October 1952	3 days	2 years, 222 days	1947 1950
24.	29th	John Allan (1866–1936)		Country	MLA for Rodney (1917–1936)	18 November 1924	20 May 1927	2 years, 183 days		
25.	37th	Sir John McDonald (1898–1977)		Country	MLA for Shepparton (1945–1955)	27 June 1950	28 October 1952	2 years, 123 days	2 years, 170 days	
25.	37th	Sir John McDonald (1898–1977)		Country	MLA for Shepparton (1945–1955)	31 October 1952	17 December 1952	47 days	2 years, 170 days	
26.	1st	Dr William Haines (1810–1866)		No Party Alignment	MLA for South Grant (1856–1858)	30 November 1855	11 March 1857	1 year, 101 days	2 years, 149 days	1856
26.	1st	Dr William Haines (1810–1866)		No Party Alignment	MLA for South Grant (1856–1858)	29 April 1857	10 March 1858	315 days	2 years, 149 days	1856
27.	46th	Ted Baillieu (1953– )		Liberal	MLA for Hawthorn (1999–2014)	2 December 2010	6 March 2013	2 years, 94 days		2010
28.	42nd	Joan Kirner (1938–2015)		Labor	MLA for Williamstown (1988–1994)	10 August 1990	6 October 1992	2 years, 57 days		
29.	9th	James Francis (1819–1884)		No Party Alignment	MLA for Richmond (1859–1874)	10 June 1872	31 July 1874	2 years, 51 days		
30.	24th	William Watt (1871–1946); PC		Commonwealth Liberal	MLA for Essendon (1904–1914)	18 May 1912	9 December 1913	1 year, 205 days	2 years, 18 days	
30.	24th	William Watt (1871–1946); PC		Commonwealth Liberal	MLA for Essendon (1904–1914)	22 December 1913	18 June 1914	178 days	2 years, 18 days	
31.	47th	Denis Napthine (1952– )		Liberal	MLA for Portland (1988–2002); MLA for South-West Coast (2002–2015)	6 March 2013	4 December 2014	1 year, 273 days		
32.	24th	Sir William Irvine (1858–1943)		Non-Party; Conservatism (Electoral Reform)	MLA for Lowan (1894–1906)	10 June 1902	16 February 1904	1 year, 251 days		1902
33.	17th	Sir James Patterson (1833–1895)		Non-Party; Conservatism	MLA for Castlemaine (1870–1895)	23 January 1893	27 September 1894	1 year, 247 days		
34.	13th	Sir Bryan O'Loghlen, 3rd Baronet (1828–1905)		No Party Alignment	MLA for West Bourke (1880–1883)	9 July 1881	8 March 1883	1 year, 242 days		
35.	15th	James Munro (1832–1908)		Non-Party; Liberalism (National Liberal)	MLA for Geelong (1886–1892)	5 November 1890	16 February 1892	1 year, 103 days		
36.	3rd	William Nicholson (1816–1865)		No Party Alignment	MLA for Sandridge (1859–1864)	27 October 1859	26 November 1860	1 year, 30 days		1859
37.	31st	Sir William McPherson (1865–1932)		Nationalist	MLA for Hawthorn (1913–1930)	22 November 1928	12 December 1929	1 year, 20 days		
38.	10th	George Kerferd (1831–1889)		No Party Alignment	MLA for Ovens (1864–1886)	31 July 1874	7 August 1875	1 year, 7 days		1874
39.	8th	Sir Charles Duffy (1816–1903)		No Party Alignment	MLA for Dalhousie (1867–1874)	19 June 1871	10 June 1872	357 days		1871
40.	4th	Richard Heales (1821–1864)		No Party Alignment	MLA for East Bourke Boroughs (1859–1864)	26 November 1860	14 November 1861	353 days		1859
41.	19th	Allan McLean (1840–1911)		Non-Party; Liberalism	MLA for Gippsland North (1880–1901)	5 December 1899	19 November 1900	349 days		
42.	16th	William Shiels (1848–1904)		Non-Party; Liberalism	MLA for Normanby (1880–1904)	16 February 1892	23 January 1893	342 days		1892
43.	40th	Lindsay Thompson (1923–2008)		Liberal	MLA for Malvern (1970–1982)	5 June 1981	8 April 1982	307 days		
44.	7th	John MacPherson (1833–1894)		No Party Alignment	MLA for Dundas (1866–1878)	20 September 1869	9 April 1870	201 days		
45.	28th	George Prendergast (1854–1937)		Labor	MLA for North Melbourne (1900–1926)	18 July 1924	18 November 1924	123 days		
46.	50th	Ben Carroll (1975–)		Labor	MLA for Niddrie (2012–)	28 July 2026	Incumbent	114 days		
47.	26th	Sir John Bowser (1856–1936)		Nationalist	MLA for Wangaratta (1904–1927)	29 November 1917	21 March 1918	112 days		1917
48.	6th	Sir Charles Sladen (1816–1884)		No Party Alignment	MLC for Western (1864–1868)	6 May 1868	11 July 1868	66 days		
49.	35th	Ian Macfarlan (1881–1964)		Liberal	MLA for Brighton (1928–1945)	2 October 1945	21 November 1945	50 days		
50.	25th	George Elmslie (1861–1918)		Labor	MLA for Albert Park (1902–1918)	9 December 1913	22 December 1913	13 days		

== See also ==
- Premier of Victoria
- List of premiers of Victoria
- List of prime ministers of Australia by time in office
- List of Australian heads of government by time in office
- List of premiers of New South Wales by time in office
- List of premiers of Queensland by time in office
- List of premiers of South Australia by time in office
- List of premiers of Tasmania by time in office
- List of premiers of Western Australia by time in office
- List of chief ministers of the Northern Territory by time in office
- List of chief ministers of the Australian Capital Territory by time in office
