= Chester Manifold =

Chester Manifold may refer to:

- James Chester Manifold (1867–1918), member of the Australian Parliament
- Sir Thomas Chester Manifold (1897–1979), his son, member of the Victorian Parliament
