= List of premiers of New South Wales by time in office =

This is a list of premiers of New South Wales by time in office. The basis of the list is the inclusive number of days between dates.

== Rank by time in office ==
Rank	No.	Officeholder	Portrait	Party	District	Assumed office	Left office	Time in office (term)	Time in office (total)	Election wins
1	7th	Sir Henry Parkes (1815–1896)		Non-Party; Liberalism	MLA for East Sydney (1872–1877); Canterbury (1877–1880); Tenterfield (1882–1884)	14 May 1872	8 February 1875	2 years, 270 days	11 years, 278 days	1872 1880; 1882; 1887 1889
1	7th	Sir Henry Parkes (1815–1896)		Non-Party; Liberalism	MLA for East Sydney (1872–1877); Canterbury (1877–1880); Tenterfield (1882–1884)	22 March 1877	16 August 1877	147 days	11 years, 278 days	1872 1880; 1882; 1887 1889
1	7th	Sir Henry Parkes (1815–1896)		Non-Party; Liberalism	MLA for East Sydney (1872–1877); Canterbury (1877–1880); Tenterfield (1882–1884)	21 December 1878	4 January 1883	4 years, 14 days	11 years, 278 days	1872 1880; 1882; 1887 1889
1	7th	Sir Henry Parkes (1815–1896)		Free Trade	MLA for East Sydney (1872–1877); Canterbury (1877–1880); Tenterfield (1882–1884)	25 January 1887	16 January 1889	1 year, 357 days	11 years, 278 days	1872 1880; 1882; 1887 1889
1	7th	Sir Henry Parkes (1815–1896)		Free Trade	MLA for East Sydney (1872–1877); Canterbury (1877–1880); Tenterfield (1882–1884)	8 March 1889	23 October 1891	2 years, 229 days	11 years, 278 days	1872 1880; 1882; 1887 1889
2	39th	Bob Carr (1947– )		Labor	MLA for Maroubra (1983–2005)	4 April 1995	3 August 2005		10 years, 121 days	1995 1999; 2003
3	35th	Neville Wran (1926–2014)		Labor	MLA for Bass Hill (1973–1986)	14 May 1976	4 July 1986		10 years, 81 days	1976 1978; 1981; 1984
4	32nd	Sir Robert Askin (1907–1981)		Liberal	MLA for Collaroy (1950–1973); Pittwater (1973–1975)	13 May 1965	3 January 1975		9 years, 235 days	1965 1968; 1971; 1973
5	29th	Joseph Cahill (1891–1959)		Labor	MLA for Cook's River (1941–1959)	2 April 1952	22 October 1959		7 years, 203 days	1953 1956; 1959
6	25th	Sir Bertram Stevens (1889–1973)		United Australia	MLA for Croydon (1927–1940)	16 May 1932	5 August 1939		7 years, 81 days	1932 1935; 1938
7	2nd	Sir Charles Cowper (1807–1875)		No Party Alignment	MLA for Sydney City (1856–1859); East Sydney (1859–1867)	26 August 1856	2 October 1856	37 days	6 years, 352 days	1865
7	2nd	Sir Charles Cowper (1807–1875)		No Party Alignment	MLA for Sydney City (1856–1859); East Sydney (1859–1867)	7 September 1857	26 October 1859	2 years, 49 days	6 years, 352 days	1865
7	2nd	Sir Charles Cowper (1807–1875)		No Party Alignment	MLA for Sydney City (1856–1859); East Sydney (1859–1867)	10 January 1861	15 October 1863	2 years, 278 days	6 years, 352 days	1865
7	2nd	Sir Charles Cowper (1807–1875)		No Party Alignment	MLA for Sydney City (1856–1859); East Sydney (1859–1867)	3 February 1865	21 January 1866	352 days	6 years, 352 days	1865
7	2nd	Sir Charles Cowper (1807–1875)		No Party Alignment	MLA for Liverpool Plains (1869–1870)	13 January 1870	15 December 1870	336 days	6 years, 352 days	1865
8	19th	William Holman (1871–1934)		Labor	MLA for Cootamundra (1904–1920)	30 June 1913	15 November 1916	3 years, 138 days	6 years, 287 days	1913 1917
8	19th	William Holman (1871–1934)		Nationalist	MLA for Cootamundra (1904–1920)	15 November 1916	12 April 1920	3 years, 149 days	6 years, 287 days	1913 1917
9	27th	Sir William McKell (1891–1985)		Labor	MLA for Redfern (1927–1947)	16 May 1941	6 February 1947		5 years, 266 days	1941 1944
10	6th	Sir James Martin (1820–1886)		No Party Alignment	MLA for Tumut (1863–1864); Lachlan (1864–1869); East Sydney (1869–1872)	16 October 1863	2 February 1865	475 days	5 years, 171 days	
10	6th	Sir James Martin (1820–1886)		No Party Alignment	MLA for Tumut (1863–1864); Lachlan (1864–1869); East Sydney (1869–1872)	22 January 1866	26 October 1868	2 years, 278 days	5 years, 171 days	
10	6th	Sir James Martin (1820–1886)		No Party Alignment	MLA for Tumut (1863–1864); Lachlan (1864–1869); East Sydney (1869–1872)	16 December 1870	13 May 1872	1 year, 149 days	5 years, 171 days	
11	28th	James McGirr (1890–1957)		Labor	MLA for Bankstown (1927–1950); Liverpool (1950–1952)	6 February 1947	2 April 1952		5 years, 56 days	1947 1950
12	12th	Sir George Reid (1845–1918)		Free Trade	MLA for Sydney-King (1894–1901)	3 August 1894	13 September 1899		5 years, 41 days	1894 1895; 1898
13	45th	Gladys Berejiklian (1970–)		Liberal	MLA for Willoughby (2003–2021)	23 January 2017	5 October 2021		4 years, 255 days	2019
14	5th	Sir John Robertson (1816–1891)		No Party Alignment	MLA for Upper Hunter (1859–1861)	9 March 1860	9 January 1861	306 days	4 years, 242 days	1860 1874; 1877
14	5th	Sir John Robertson (1816–1891)		No Party Alignment	MLA for Clarence (1866–1869); West Sydney (1869–1877)	27 October 1868	12 January 1870	1 year, 77 days	4 years, 242 days	1860 1874; 1877
14	5th	Sir John Robertson (1816–1891)		No Party Alignment	MLA for Clarence (1866–1869); West Sydney (1869–1877)	9 February 1875	21 March 1877	2 years, 12 days	4 years, 242 days	1860 1874; 1877
14	5th	Sir John Robertson (1816–1891)		No Party Alignment	MLA for East Macquarie (1877–1878)	17 August 1877	17 December 1877	122 days	4 years, 242 days	1860 1874; 1877
14	5th	Sir John Robertson (1816–1891)		No Party Alignment	MLA for Mudgee (1882–1886)	22 December 1885	22 February 1886	62 days	4 years, 242 days	1860 1874; 1877
15	30th	Bob Heffron (1890–1978)		Labor	MLA for Maroubra (1950–1968)	23 October 1959	30 April 1964		4 years, 190 days	1962
16	37th	Nick Greiner (1947– )		Liberal	MLA for Ku-ring-gai (1980–1992)	25 March 1988	24 June 1992		4 years, 91 days	1988 1991
17	23rd	Jack Lang (1876–1975)		Labor	MLA for Parramatta (1920–1927)	17 June 1925	18 October 1927	2 years, 123 days	3 years, 314 days	1925 1930
17	23rd	Jack Lang (1876–1975)		Labor	MLA for Auburn (1927–1946)	4 November 1930	15 October 1931	345 days	3 years, 314 days	1925 1930
17	23rd	Jack Lang (1876–1975)		Labor (NSW)	MLA for Auburn (1927–1946)	15 October 1931	13 May 1932	211 days	3 years, 314 days	1925 1930
18	47th	Chris Minns (1979– )		Labor	MLA for Kogarah (2015–present)	28 March 2023	Incumbent		3 years, 153 days	2023
19	14th	Sir John See (1844–1907)		Progressive	MLA for Grafton (1880–1904)	28 March 1901	14 June 1904		3 years, 78 days	1901
20	22nd	Sir George Fuller (1861–1940)		Nationalist	MLA for Wollondilly (1920–1927)	20 December 1921	20 December 1921	1 day	3 years, 66 days	1922
20	22nd	Sir George Fuller (1861–1940)		Nationalist	MLA for Wollondilly (1920–1927)	13 April 1922	17 June 1925	3 years, 65 days	3 years, 66 days	1922
21	10th	Sir George Dibbs (1834–1904)		Non-Party; Conservatism	MLA for Murrumbidgee (1885–1894)	7 October 1885	21 December 1885	75 days	3 years, 42 days	1885 1891
21	10th	Sir George Dibbs (1834–1904)		Protectionist	MLA for Murrumbidgee (1885–1894)	17 January 1889	7 March 1889	49 days	3 years, 42 days	1885 1891
21	10th	Sir George Dibbs (1834–1904)		Protectionist	MLA for Murrumbidgee (1885–1894)	23 October 1891	2 August 1894	2 years, 283 days	3 years, 42 days	1885 1891
22	40th	Morris Iemma (1961– )		Labor	MLA for Lakemba (1999–2008)	3 August 2005	5 September 2008		3 years, 33 days	2007
23	16th	Sir Joseph Carruthers (1857–1922)		Liberal Reform	MLA for St George (1894–1908)	29 August 1904	1 October 1907		3 years, 33 days	1904 1907
24	43rd	Barry O'Farrell (1959– )		Liberal	MLA for Ku-ring-gai (1999–2015)	28 March 2011	23 April 2014		3 years, 26 days	2011
25	24th	Sir Thomas Bavin (1874–1941)		Nationalist	MLA for Gordon (1927–1935)	18 October 1927	4 November 1930		3 years, 17 days	1927
26	17th	Sir Charles Wade (1863–1922)		Liberal Reform	MLA for Gordon (1904–1917)	2 October 1907	1 October 1910		2 years, 364 days	
27	38th	John Fahey (1945–2020)		Liberal	MLA for Southern Highlands (1988–1996)	24 June 1992	4 April 1995		2 years, 284 days	
28	44th	Mike Baird (1968– )		Liberal	MLA for Manly (2007–2017)	17 April 2014	23 January 2017		2 years, 275 days	2015
29	9th	Sir Alexander Stuart (1824–1886)		No Party Alignment	MLA for Illawarra (1880–1885)	5 January 1883	7 October 1885		2 years, 275 days	
30	18th	James McGowen (1855–1922)		Labor	MLA for Redfern (1891–1917)	21 October 1910	29 June 1913		2 years, 251 days	1910
31	26th	Alexander Mair (1889–1969)		United Australia	MLA for Albury (1932–1946)	5 August 1939	16 May 1941		1 year, 284 days	
32	36th	Barrie Unsworth (1934– )		Labor	MLA for Rockdale (1986–1991)	4 July 1986	25 March 1988		1 year, 265 days	
33	13th	Sir William Lyne (1844–1913)		Protectionist	MLA for Hume (1880–1901)	14 September 1899	27 March 1901		1 year, 194 days	
34	20th	John Storey (1869–1921)		Labor	MLA for Balmain (1907–1921)	13 April 1920	5 October 1921		1 year, 175 days	1920
35	46th	Dominic Perrottet (1982–)		Liberal	MLA for Castle Hill (2011–2015); Hawkesbury (2015–2019); Epping (2019–2024)	5 October 2021	28 March 2023		1 year, 174 days	
36	42nd	Kristina Keneally (1968– )		Labor	MLA for Heffron (2003–2012)	4 December 2009	28 March 2011		1 year, 114 days	
37	41st	Nathan Rees (1968– )		Labor	MLA for Toongabbie (2007–2015)	5 September 2008	4 December 2009		1 year, 90 days	
38	33rd	Tom Lewis (1922–2016)		Liberal	MLA for Wollondilly (1957–1978)	3 January 1975	23 January 1976		1 year, 20 days	
39	31st	Jack Renshaw (1909–1987)		Labor	MLA for Castlereagh (1941–1980)	30 April 1964	13 May 1965		1 year, 13 days	
40	8th	James Farnell (1825–1888)		No Party Alignment	MLA for St Leonards (1874–1882)	18 December 1877	20 December 1878		1 year, 2 days	
41	3rd	Sir Henry Parker (1808–1881)		No Party Alignment	MLA for Parramatta (1856–1857)	3 October 1856	7 September 1857		339 days	
42	11th	Sir Patrick Jennings (1831–1897)		Non-Party; Conservatism	MLA for Bogan (1880–1887)	26 February 1886	19 January 1887		327 days	
43	21st	James Dooley (1877–1950)		Labor	MLA for Hartley (1907–1920); Bathurst (1920–1927)	5 October 1921	20 December 1921	76 days	190 days	
43	21st	James Dooley (1877–1950)		Labor	MLA for Hartley (1907–1920); Bathurst (1920–1927)	20 December 1921	13 April 1922	114 days	190 days	
44	4th	William Forster (1818–1882)		No Party Alignment	MLA for Queanbeyan (1859–1860)	27 October 1859	9 March 1860		134 days	1859
45	34th	Sir Eric Willis (1922–1999)		Liberal	MLA for Earlwood (1950–1978)	23 January 1976	14 May 1976		112 days	
46	1st	Sir Stuart Donaldson (1812–1867)		No Party Alignment	MLA for Sydney Hamlets (1856)	6 June 1856	25 August 1856		80 days	1856
47	15th	Thomas Waddell (1854–1940)		Progressive	MLA for Cowra (1998–1904)	15 June 1904	29 August 1904		75 days	

== Total time in office of Australian political parties ==
New South Wales Parliament – 62174 days as of 28 August 2026

- Before Parties – 10716 days
- Liberalism – 6787 days

Since 7 October 1885

- Labor Party – 24553 days as of 28 August 2026
- Liberal Party – 10973 days
- Protectionist Party – 1987 days
- Progressive Party – 1251 days
- Liberal Reform Party – 1129 days
- Liberal Reform Party – 1096 days
- Liberalism (Non Party) – 63 days

== See also ==
- Premier of New South Wales
- List of prime ministers of Australia by time in office
- List of Australian heads of government by time in office
- List of premiers of Queensland by time in office
- List of premiers of South Australia by time in office
- List of premiers of Tasmania by time in office
- List of premiers of Western Australia by time in office
- List of premiers of Victoria by time in office
- List of chief ministers of the Northern Territory by time in office
- List of chief ministers of the Australian Capital Territory by time in office
