= List of premiers of Western Australia by time in office =

This is a list of premiers of Western Australia by time in office. The basis of the list is the inclusive number of days between dates.

== Rank by time in office ==
Rank	No.	Officeholder	Portrait	Party	District	Assumed office	Left office	Time in office (term)	Time in office (total)	Election wins
1.	19th	Sir David Brand (1912–1979)		Liberal	MLA for Greenough (1945–1975)	2 April 1959	3 March 1971		11 years, 335 days	1959 1962; 1965; 1968
2.	1st	Sir John Forrest (1847–1918)		Pro-Forrest	MLA for Bunbury (1890–1901)	29 December 1890	15 February 1901		10 years, 48 days	1890 1894; 1897
3.	14th	Philip Collier (1873–1948)		Labor	MLA for Boulder (1905–1948)	16 April 1924	24 April 1930	6 years, 8 days	9 years, 126 days	1924 1927; 1933; 1936
3.	14th	Philip Collier (1873–1948)		Labor	MLA for Boulder (1905–1948)	24 April 1933	20 August 1936	3 years, 118 days	9 years, 126 days	1924 1927; 1933; 1936
4.	15th	John Willcock (1879–1956)		Labor	MLA for Geraldton (1917–1947)	20 August 1936	31 July 1945		8 years, 345 days	1939 1943
5.	29th	Colin Barnett (1950– )		Liberal	MLA for Cottesloe (1990–2018)	23 September 2008	17 March 2017		8 years, 175 days	2008 2013
6.	26th	Richard Court (1947– )		Liberal	MLA for Nedlands (1982–2001)	16 February 1993	10 February 2001		7 years, 360 days	1993 1996
7.	13th	Sir James Mitchell (1866–1951)		Nationalist	MLA for Northam (1905–1933)	17 May 1919	16 April 1924	4 years, 335 days	7 years, 335 days	1921 1930
7.	13th	Sir James Mitchell (1866–1951)		Nationalist	MLA for Northam (1905–1933)	24 April 1930	24 April 1933	3 years, 0 days	7 years, 335 days	1921 1930
8.	21st	Sir Charles Court (1911–2007)		Liberal	MLA for Nedlands (1953–1982)	8 April 1974	25 January 1982		7 years, 292 days	1974 1977; 1980
9.	30th	Mark McGowan (1967– )		Labor	MLA for Rockingham (1996–2023)	17 March 2017	8 June 2023		6 years, 83 days	2017 2021
10.	18th	Albert Hawke (1900–1986)		Labor	MLA for Northam (1933–1968)	23 February 1953	2 April 1959		6 years, 37 days	1953 1956
11.	17th	Sir Ross McLarty (1891–1962)		Liberal	MLA for Murray-Wellington (1930–1950); Murray (1950–1962)	1 April 1947	23 February 1953		5 years, 328 days	1947 1950
12.	23rd	Brian Burke (1947– )		Labor	MLA for Balga (1983–1988)	25 February 1983	25 February 1988		5 years, 0 days	1983 1986
13.	27th	Dr Geoff Gallop (1951– )		Labor	MLA for Victoria Park (1986–2006)	16 February 2001	25 January 2006		4 years, 343 days	2001 2005
14.	10th	John Scaddan (1876–1934)		Labor	MLA for Brown Hill-Ivanhoe (1911–1916)	7 October 1911	27 July 1916		4 years, 294 days	1911 1914
15.	8th	Sir Newton Moore (1870–1936)		Ministerial	MLA for Bunbury (1904–1911)	7 May 1906	16 September 1910		4 years, 132 days	1908
16.	31st	Roger Cook (1965– )		Labor	MLA for Kwinana (2008–)	8 June 2023	Incumbent		3 years, 84 days	2025
17.	20th	John Tonkin (1902–1995)		Labor	MLA for Melville (1950–1977)	3 March 1971	8 April 1974		3 years, 66 days	1971
18.	25th	Dr Carmen Lawrence (1948– )		Labor	MLA for Glendalough (1989–1994)	12 February 1990	16 February 1993		3 years, 4 days	
19.	28th	Alan Carpenter (1957– )		Labor	MLA for Willagee (1996–2009)	25 January 2006	23 September 2008		2 years, 242 days	
20.	5th	Sir Walter James (1863–1943)		Opposition	MLA for East Perth (1894–1904)	1 July 1902	10 August 1904		2 years, 40 days	
21.	9th	Frank Wilson (1866–1951)		Nationalist	MLA for Sussex (1904–1917)	16 September 1910	7 October 1911	1 year, 21 days	1 year, 357 days	
21.	9th	Frank Wilson (1866–1951)		Liberal (WA)	MLA for Sussex (1904–1917)	27 July 1916	28 June 1917	336 days	1 year, 357 days	
22.	24th	Peter Dowding (1943– )		Labor	MLA for Maylands (1986–1990)	25 February 1988	12 February 1990		1 year, 352 days	1989
23.	11th	Sir Henry Lefroy (1854–1930)		Nationalist	MLA for Moore (1911–1921)	28 June 1917	17 April 1919		1 year, 293 days	1917
24.	16th	Frank Wise (1897–1986)		Labor	MLA for Gascoyne (1933–1951)	31 July 1945	1 April 1947		1 year, 244 days	
25.	22nd	Ray O'Connor (1926–2013)		Liberal	MLA for Mount Lawley (1962–1984)	25 January 1982	25 February 1983		1 year, 31 days	
26.	6th	Henry Daglish (1866–1920)		Labor	MLA for Subiaco (1901–1911)	10 August 1904	25 August 1905		1 year, 15 days	
27.	3rd	George Leake (1856–1902)		Opposition	MLA for West Perth (1901–1902)	27 May 1901	21 November 1901	178 days	1 year, 3 days	1901
27.	3rd	George Leake (1856–1902)		Opposition	MLA for West Perth (1901–1902)	23 December 1901	1 July 1902	190 days	1 year, 3 days	1901
28.	7th	Sir Cornthwaite Rason (1858–1927)		Ministerial	MLA for Guildford (1901–1906)	25 August 1905	7 May 1906		255 days	1905
29.	2nd	George Throssell (1840–1910)		Pro-Forrest	MLA for Northam (1890–1904)	15 February 1901	27 May 1901		101 days	
30.	4th	Alf Morgans (1850–1933)		Ministerial	MLA for Coolgardie (1897–1904)	21 November 1901	23 December 1901		32 days	
31.	12th	Sir Hal Colebatch (1872–1953)		Nationalist	Member of the Legislative Council (1912–1923)	17 April 1919	17 May 1919		30 days	

== See also ==
- Premier of Western Australia
- List of prime ministers of Australia by time in office
- List of Australian heads of government by time in office
- List of premiers of New South Wales by time in office
- List of premiers of Queensland by time in office
- List of premiers of Tasmania by time in office
- List of premiers of South Australia by time in office
- List of premiers of Victoria by time in office
- List of chief ministers of the Northern Territory by time in office
- List of chief ministers of the Australian Capital Territory by time in office
