= List of premiers of Queensland by time in office =

This is a list of premiers of Queensland by time in office. The basis of the list is the inclusive number of days between dates.

== Rank by time in office ==
| Rank | No. | Officeholder | Portrait | Party | District | Assumed office | Left office | Time in office (term) | Time in office (total) | Election wins |
|---|---|---|---|---|---|---|---|---|---|---|
| 1. | 31st | Sir; Joh Bjelke-Petersen (1911–2005) | | Country & National | Barambah (1950–1987) | 8 August 1968 | 1 December 1987 | 19 years, 115 days | | 1969 1972; 1974; 1977 1980; 1983; 1986 |
| 2. | 28th | Sir; Frank Nicklin (1895–1978) | | Country | Landsborough (1950–1968) | 12 August 1957 | 17 January 1968 | 10 years, 158 days | | 1957 1960; 1963; 1966 |
| 3. | 24th | William Forgan Smith (1887–1953) | | Labor | Mackay (1915–1942) | 17 June 1932 | 16 September 1942 | 10 years, 91 days | | 1932 1935; 1938; 1941 |
| 4. | 36th | Peter Beattie (1952–) | | Labor | Brisbane Central (1989–2007) | 20 June 1998 | 13 September 2007 | 9 years, 85 days | | 1998 2001; 2004; 2006 |
| 5. | 39th | Annastacia Palaszczuk (1969–) | | Labor | Inala (2006–2023) | 14 February 2015 | 15 December 2023 | 8 years, 304 days | | 2015 2017; 2020 |
| 6. | 9th | Sir; Samuel Griffith (1845–1920) | | Liberalism | North Brisbane (1878–1888) | 13 November 1883 | 13 June 1888 | 4 years, 213 days | 7 years, 75 days | 1883 |
| 6. | 9th | Sir; Samuel Griffith (1845–1920) | | Ministerial | Brisbane North (1888–1893) | 12 August 1890 | 27 March 1893 | 2 years, 227 days | 7 years, 75 days | 1883 |
| 7. | 34th | Wayne Goss (1951–2014) | | Labor | Logan (1986–1998) | 7 December 1989 | 19 February 1996 | 6 years, 74 days | | 1989 1992; 1995 |
| 8. | 1st | Sir; Robert Herbert (1831–1905) | | No Party Alignment | Leichhardt (1860–1863) | 10 December 1859 | 1 February 1866 | 6 years, 53 days | 6 years, 71 days | |
| 8. | 1st | Sir; Robert Herbert (1831–1905) | | No Party Alignment | West Moreton (1863–1866) | 20 July 1866 | 7 August 1866 | 18 days | 6 years, 71 days | |
| 9. | 26th | Ned Hanlon (1887–1952) | | Labor | Ithaca (1926–1952) | 7 March 1946 | 15 January 1952 | 5 years, 314 days | | 1947 1950 |
| 10. | 8th | Sir; Thomas McIlwraith (1835–1900) | | Conservative | Mulgrave (1878–1886) | 21 January 1879 | 13 November 1883 | 4 years, 296 days | 5 years, 314 days | 1888 1893 |
| 10. | 8th | Sir; Thomas McIlwraith (1835–1900) | | Conservative | Brisbane North (1888–1896) | 13 June 1888 | 30 November 1888 | 170 days | 5 years, 314 days | 1888 1893 |
| 10. | 8th | Sir; Thomas McIlwraith (1835–1900) | | Ministerial | Brisbane North (1888–1896) | 27 March 1893 | 27 October 1893 | 214 days | 5 years, 314 days | 1888 1893 |
| 11. | 27th | Vince Gair (1901–1980) | | Labor | South Brisbane (1932–1960) | 17 January 1952 | 24 April 1957 | 5 years, 97 days | 5 years, 207 days | 1953 1956 |
| 11. | 27th | Vince Gair (1901–1980) | | Queensland Labor | South Brisbane (1932–1960) | 24 April 1957 | 12 August 1957 | 110 days | 5 years, 207 days | 1953 1956 |
| 12. | 20th | Ted Theodore (1884–1950) | | Labor | Chillagoe (1912–1925) | 22 October 1919 | 26 February 1925 | 5 years, 127 days | | 1920 1923 |
| 13. | 17th | William Kidston (1849–1919) | | Labor | Rockhampton (1932–1960) | 19 January 1906 | 18 May 1907 | 1 year, 119 days | 4 years, 262 days | 1907 1908; 1909 |
| 13. | 17th | William Kidston (1849–1919) | | Kidston | Rockhampton (1932–1960) | 18 May 1907 | 19 November 1907 | 185 days | 4 years, 262 days | 1907 1908; 1909 |
| 13. | 17th | William Kidston (1849–1919) | | Kidston/Liberal | Rockhampton (1932–1960) | 18 February 1908 | 7 February 1911 | 2 years, 354 days | 4 years, 262 days | 1907 1908; 1909 |
| 14. | 37th | Anna Bligh (1960–) | | Labor | South Brisbane (1995–2012) | 13 September 2007 | 26 March 2012 | 4 years, 195 days | | 2009 |
| 15. | 11th | Sir; Hugh Nelson (1833–1906) | | Ministerial | Murilla (1888–1898) | 27 October 1893 | 13 April 1898 | 4 years, 168 days | | 1896 |
| 16. | 19th | T. J. Ryan (1876–1921) | | Labor | Barcoo (1909–1919) | 1 June 1915 | 22 October 1919 | 4 years, 143 days | | 1915 1918 |
| 17. | 18th | Digby Denham (1859–1944) | | Liberal | Oxley (1902–1915) | 7 February 1911 | 1 June 1915 | 4 years, 114 days | | 1912 |
| 18. | 15th | Sir; Robert Philp (1851–1922) | | Ministerial | Townsville (1888–1912) | 17 December 1899 | 17 September 1903 | 3 years, 274 days | 4 years, 10 days | |
| 18. | 15th | Sir; Robert Philp (1851–1922) | | Conservative | Townsville (1888–1912) | 19 November 1907 | 18 February 1908 | 91 days | 4 years, 10 days | |
| 19. | 2nd | Arthur Macalister (1818–1883) | | No Party Alignment | Ipswich (1860–1868) (1872–1876) | 1 February 1866 | 20 July 1866 | 169 days | 3 years, 296 days | |
| 19. | 2nd | Arthur Macalister (1818–1883) | | No Party Alignment | Ipswich (1860–1868) (1872–1876) | 7 August 1866 | 15 August 1867 | 1 year, 8 days | 3 years, 296 days | |
| 19. | 2nd | Arthur Macalister (1818–1883) | | No Party Alignment | Ipswich (1860–1868) (1872–1876) | 8 January 1874 | 5 June 1876 | 2 years, 149 days | 3 years, 296 days | |
| 20. | 5th | Sir; Arthur Palmer (1819–1898) | | No Party Alignment | Port Curtis (1866–1878) | 3 May 1870 | 7 January 1874 | 3 years, 249 days | | |
| 21. | 22nd | William McCormack (1879–1947) | | Labor | Cairns (1912–1930) | 22 October 1925 | 21 May 1929 | 3 years, 211 days | | 1926 |
| 22. | 25th | Frank Cooper (1872–1949) | | Labor | Bremer (1915–1946) | 16 September 1942 | 7 March 1946 | 3 years, 172 days | | 1944 |
| 23. | 23rd | Arthur Moore (1876–1963) | | Country and Progressive; National Party | Aubigny (1915–1941) | 21 May 1929 | 17 June 1932 | 3 years, 27 days | | 1929 |
| 24. | 38th | Campbell Newman (1963–) | | Liberal National | Ashgrove (2012–2015) | 26 March 2012 | 14 February 2015 | 2 years, 325 days | | 2012 |
| 25. | 35th | Rob Borbidge (1954–) | | National | Surfers Paradise (1980–2001) | 19 February 1996 | 26 June 1998 | 2 years, 127 days | | |
| 26. | 16th | Sir; Arthur Morgan (1856–1916) | | Ministerial | Warwick (1898–1906) | 17 September 1903 | 19 January 1906 | 2 years, 124 days | | 1904 |
| 27. | 41st | David Crisafulli (1979–) | | Liberal National | Mundingburra (2012–2015); Broadwater (2017–) | 28 October 2024 | Incumbent | 1 year, 329 days | | 2024 |
| 28. | 7th | John Douglas (1828–1904) | | No Party Alignment | Maryborough (1875–1880) | 8 March 1877 | 21 January 1879 | 1 year, 319 days | | 1878 |
| 29. | 32nd | Mike Ahern (1942–2023) | | National | Landsborough (1968–1990) | 1 December 1987 | 25 September 1989 | 1 year, 298 days | | |
| 30. | 10th | Boyd Morehead (1843–1905) | | Conservative | Balonne (1883–1896) | 30 November 1888 | 12 August 1890 | 1 year, 255 days | | |
| 31. | 4th | Sir; Charles Lilley (1827–1897) | | No Party Alignment | Fortitude Valley (1860–1874) | 25 November 1868 | 2 May 1870 | 1 year, 158 days | | |
| 32. | 3rd | Sir; Robert Mackenzie (1811–1873); Bt | | No Party Alignment | Burnett (1860–1869) | 15 August 1867 | 25 November 1868 | 1 year, 102 days | | |
| 33. | 13th | Sir; James Dickson (1832–1901) | | Ministerial | Bulimba (1892–1901) | 1 October 1898 | 1 December 1899 | 1 year, 61 days | | 1899 |
| 34. | 40th | Steven Miles (1977–) | | Labor | Mount Coot-tha (2015–2017); Murrumba (2017–) | 15 December 2023 | 28 October 2024 | 318 days | | |
| 35. | 6th | George Thorn (1838–1905) | | No Party Alignment | Ipswich (1876–1878) | 5 June 1876 | 8 March 1877 | 276 days | | |
| 36. | 21st | William Gillies (1868–1928) | | Labor | Eacham (1912–1925) | 26 February 1925 | 22 October 1925 | 238 days | | |
| 37. | 29th | Jack Pizzey (1911–1968) | | Country | Isis (1950–1968) | 17 January 1968 | 31 July 1968 | 227 days | | |
| 38. | 12th | Thomas Byrnes (1860–1898) | | Ministerial | Warwick (1896–1898) | 13 April 1898 | 27 September 1898 | 167 days | | |
| 39. | 33rd | Russell Cooper (1941–) | | National | Roma (1983–1992) | 25 September 1989 | 7 December 1989 | 73 days | | |
| 40. | 30th | Sir; Gordon Chalk (1913–1991) | | Liberal | Lockyer (1950–1976) | 1 August 1968 | 8 August 1968 | 7 days | | |
| 41. | 14th | Anderson Dawson (1863–1910) | | Labor | Charters Towers (1893–1901) | 1 December 1899 | 7 December 1899 | 6 days | | |

== See also ==
- Premier of Queensland
- List of prime ministers of Australia by time in office
- List of Australian heads of government by time in office
- List of premiers of New South Wales by time in office
- List of premiers of South Australia by time in office
- List of premiers of Tasmania by time in office
- List of premiers of Victoria by time in office
- List of premiers of Western Australia by time in office
- List of chief ministers of the Northern Territory by time in office
- List of chief ministers of the Australian Capital Territory by time in office
