= List of prime ministers of Australia by time in office =

This is a list of prime ministers of Australia by time in office. The basis of the list is the inclusive number of days from being sworn in until leaving office, if counted by number of calendar days all the figures would be one greater.

== Rank by time in office ==
Parties

Liberal Labor Country (National) United Australia Nationalist National Labor Commonwealth Liberal Free Trade Protectionist

Rank	No.	Prime Minister	Party	Assumed office	Left office	Time in office (term)	Time in office (total)	Election(s) won	Ref
1.	12th	Sir Robert Menzies (1894–1978)	United Australia	26 April 1939	29 August 1941	2 years, 125 days	18 years, 163 days	1940, 1949, 1951, 1954, 1955, 1958, 1961, 1963	
1.	12th	Sir Robert Menzies (1894–1978)	Liberal	19 December 1949	26 January 1966	16 years, 38 days	18 years, 163 days	1940, 1949, 1951, 1954, 1955, 1958, 1961, 1963	
2.	25th	John Howard (born 1939)	Liberal	11 March 1996	3 December 2007	11 years, 267 days		1996, 1998, 2001, 2004	
3.	23rd	Bob Hawke (1929–2019)	Labor	11 March 1983	20 December 1991	8 years, 284 days		1983, 1984, 1987, 1990	
4.	22nd	Malcolm Fraser (1930–2015)	Liberal	11 November 1975	11 March 1983	7 years, 120 days		1975, 1977, 1980	
5.	7th	Billy Hughes (1862–1952)	Labor	27 October 1915	9 February 1923	7 years, 105 days		1917, 1919, 1922	
5.	7th	Billy Hughes (1862–1952)	National Labor	27 October 1915	9 February 1923	7 years, 105 days		1917, 1919, 1922	
5.	7th	Billy Hughes (1862–1952)	Nationalist	27 October 1915	9 February 1923	7 years, 105 days		1917, 1919, 1922	
6.	10th	Joseph Lyons (1879–1939)	United Australia	6 January 1932	7 April 1939 (Note: Died in office)	7 years, 91 days		1931, 1934, 1937	
7.	8th	Stanley Bruce (1883–1967)	Nationalist	9 February 1923	22 October 1929	6 years, 255 days		1925, 1928	
8.	2nd	Alfred Deakin (1856–1919)	Protectionist	24 September 1903	27 April 1904	216 days	4 years, 313 days	1903, 1906	
8.	2nd	Alfred Deakin (1856–1919)	Protectionist	5 July 1905	13 November 1908	3 years, 131 days	4 years, 313 days	1903, 1906	
8.	2nd	Alfred Deakin (1856–1919)	Commonwealth Liberal	2 June 1909	29 April 1910	331 days	4 years, 313 days	1903, 1906	
9.	5th	Andrew Fisher (1862–1928)	Labor	13 November 1908	2 June 1909	201 days	4 years, 297 days	1910, 1914	
9.	5th	Andrew Fisher (1862–1928)	Labor	29 April 1910	24 June 1913	3 years, 56 days	4 years, 297 days	1910, 1914	
9.	5th	Andrew Fisher (1862–1928)	Labor	17 September 1914	27 October 1915	1 year, 40 days	4 years, 297 days	1910, 1914	
10.	31st	Anthony Albanese (born 1963)	Labor	23 May 2022	Incumbent	4 years, 171 days (Note: As of 10 November 2026)		2022, 2025	
11.	16th	Ben Chifley (1885–1951)	Labor	13 July 1945	19 December 1949	4 years, 159 days		1946	
12.	24th	Paul Keating (born 1944)	Labor	20 December 1991	11 March 1996	4 years, 82 days		1993	
13.	30th	Scott Morrison (born 1968)	Liberal	24 August 2018	23 May 2022	3 years, 272 days		2019	
14.	14th	John Curtin (1885–1945)	Labor	7 October 1941	5 July 1945 (Note: Died in office)	3 years, 271 days		1943	
15.	19th	John Gorton (1911–2002)	Liberal	10 January 1968	10 March 1971	3 years, 59 days		1969	
16.	27th	Julia Gillard (born 1961)	Labor	24 June 2010	27 June 2013	3 years, 3 days		2010	
17.	29th	Malcolm Turnbull (born 1954)	Liberal	15 September 2015	24 August 2018	2 years, 343 days		2016	
18.	21st	Gough Whitlam (1916–2014)	Labor	5 December 1972	11 November 1975	2 years, 341 days		1972, 1974	
19.	26th	Kevin Rudd (born 1957)	Labor	3 December 2007	24 June 2010	2 years, 203 days	2 years, 286 days	2007	
19.	26th	Kevin Rudd (born 1957)	Labor	27 June 2013	18 September 2013	83 days	2 years, 286 days	2007	
20.	1st	Sir Edmund Barton (1849–1920)	Protectionist	1 January 1901	24 September 1903	2 years, 266 days		1901	
21.	9th	James Scullin (1876–1953)	Labor	22 October 1929	6 January 1932	2 years, 76 days		1929	
22.	28th	Tony Abbott (born 1957)	Liberal	18 September 2013	15 September 2015	1 year, 362 days		2013	
23.	17th	Harold Holt (1908–1967)	Liberal	26 January 1966	19 December 1967 (Note: Died in office)	1 year, 327 days		1966	
24.	20th	William McMahon (1908–1988)	Liberal	10 March 1971	5 December 1972	1 year, 270 days		—	
25.	6th	Joseph Cook (1860–1947)	Commonwealth Liberal	24 June 1913	17 September 1914	1 year, 85 days		1913	
26.	4th	George Reid (1845–1918)	Free Trade	18 August 1904	5 July 1905	321 days		—	
27.	3rd	Chris Watson (1867–1941)	Labor	27 April 1904	18 August 1904	113 days		—	
28.	13th	Arthur Fadden (1894–1973)	Country	29 August 1941	7 October 1941	39 days		—	
29.	18th	John McEwen (1900–1980)	Country	19 December 1967	10 January 1968	22 days		—	
30.	11th	Sir Earle Page (1880–1961)	Country	7 April 1939	26 April 1939	19 days		—	
31.	15th	Frank Forde (1890–1983)	Labor	6 July 1945	13 July 1945	7 days		—	

== Political parties by time as Prime Minister ==
Rank	Party	Time in office (Days)	#	Prime Minister(s)
1.	Liberal Party of Australia	18504	9	Tony Abbott, John Gorton, Malcolm Fraser, Harold Holt, John Howard, William McMahon, Robert Menzies (1949–1966), Scott Morrison, and Malcolm Turnbull
2.	Australian Labor Party	15253	13	Anthony Albanese (incumbent), Ben Chifley, John Curtin, Andrew Fisher, Frank Forde, Julia Gillard, Bob Hawke, Billy Hughes (1915–1916), Paul Keating, Kevin Rudd, James Scullin, Chris Watson, and Gough Whitlam
3.	Nationalist Party	5142	2	Stanley Bruce and Billy Hughes (1917–1923)
4.	United Australia Party	3505	2	Joseph Lyons and Robert Menzies (1939–1941)
5.	Protectionist Party	2442	2	Edmund Barton and Alfred Deakin (1903–1904 and 1905–1908)
6.	Fusion Liberal Party	783	2	Joseph Cook and Alfred Deakin (1909–1910)
7.	Free Trade Party	322	1	George Reid
8.	National Labor Party	96	1	Billy Hughes (1916–1917)
9.	Country Party	84	3	Arthur Fadden, John McEwen, and Earle Page

== See also ==
- Prime Minister of Australia
- List of prime ministers of Australia
- List of prime ministers of Australia (graphical)
- List of Australian heads of government by time in office
  - List of premiers of New South Wales by time in office
  - List of premiers of Queensland by time in office
  - List of premiers of South Australia by time in office
  - List of premiers of Tasmania by time in office
  - List of premiers of Victoria by time in office
  - List of premiers of Western Australia by time in office
  - List of chief ministers of the Northern Territory by time in office
  - List of chief ministers of the Australian Capital Territory by time in office
- List of longest-serving members of the Parliament of Australia
- List of prime ministers of Canada by time in office
- List of prime ministers of the United Kingdom by length of tenure
