= List of premiers of Tasmania by time in office =

This is a list of premiers of Tasmania by time in office. The basis of the list is the inclusive number of days between dates.

== Rank by time in office ==
Rank	No.	Officeholder	Portrait	Party	District	Assumed office	Left office	Time in office (term)	Time in office (total)	Election wins
1.	30th	Sir Robert Cosgrove (1884–1969)		Labor	MHA for Denison (1933–1958)	18 December 1939	18 December 1947	8 years, 0 days	18 years, 182 days	1941 1946; 1948; 1950 1955; 1956
1.	30th	Sir Robert Cosgrove (1884–1969)		Labor	MHA for Denison (1933–1958)	25 February 1948	26 August 1958	10 years, 182 days	18 years, 182 days	1941 1946; 1948; 1950 1955; 1956
2.	32nd	Eric Reece (1909–1999)		Labor	MHA for Braddon (1945–1975)	26 August 1958	26 May 1969	10 years, 273 days	13 years, 240 days	1959 1964; 1972
2.	32nd	Eric Reece (1909–1999)		Labor	MHA for Braddon (1945–1975)	3 May 1972	31 March 1975	2 years, 332 days	13 years, 240 days	1959 1964; 1972
3.	37th	Robin Gray (1940– )		Liberal	MHA for Wilmot (1976–1984); Lyons (1984–1995)	26 May 1982	29 June 1989		7 years, 34 days	1982 1986
4.	24th	Sir Walter Lee (1874–1963)		Commonwealth Liberal	MHA for Wilmot (1909–1946)	15 April 1916	12 August 1922	6 years, 119 days	6 years, 290 days	1916 1919; 1922
4.	24th	Sir Walter Lee (1874–1963)		Nationalist	MHA for Wilmot (1909–1946)	14 August 1923	25 October 1923	72 days	6 years, 290 days	1916 1919; 1922
4.	24th	Sir Walter Lee (1874–1963)		Nationalist	MHA for Wilmot (1909–1946)	15 March 1934	22 June 1934	99 days	6 years, 290 days	1916 1919; 1922
5.	19th	Sir Elliott Lewis (1858–1935)		Conservatism	MHA for Richmond (1886–1903)	12 October 1899	9 April 1903	3 years, 179 days	6 years, 188 days	1900 1912
5.	19th	Sir Elliott Lewis (1858–1935)		Commonwealth Liberal	MHA for Denison (1909–1922)	19 June 1909	20 October 1909	123 days	6 years, 188 days	1900 1912
5.	19th	Sir Elliott Lewis (1858–1935)		Commonwealth Liberal	MHA for Denison (1909–1922)	27 October 1909	14 June 1912	2 years, 231 days	6 years, 188 days	1900 1912
6.	12th	Sir Philip Fysh (1835–1919)		No Party Alignment	MHA for Buckingham (1884–1894)	9 August 1877	5 March 1878	208 days	5 years, 349 days	
6.	12th	Sir Philip Fysh (1835–1919)		Liberalism	MHA for Buckingham (1884–1894)	29 March 1887	17 August 1892	5 years, 141 days	5 years, 349 days	
7.	45th	Will Hodgman (1969– )		Liberal	MHA for Franklin (2002–2020)	31 March 2014	20 January 2020		5 years, 295 days	2014 2018
8.	27th	Sir John McPhee (1878–1952)		Nationalist	MHA for Denison (1919–1934)	15 June 1928	15 March 1934		5 years, 273 days	1928 1931
9.	13th	William Giblin (1840–1887)		No Party Alignment	MHA for Wellington (1877–1885)	5 March 1878	20 December 1878	290 days	5 years, 215 days	1882
9.	13th	William Giblin (1840–1887)		No Party Alignment	MHA for Wellington (1877–1885)	30 October 1879	15 August 1884	4 years, 290 days	5 years, 215 days	1882
10.	41st	Jim Bacon (1950–2004)		Labor	MHA for Denison (1993–2004)	14 September 1998	21 March 2004		5 years, 189 days	1998 2002
11.	18th	Sir Edward Braddon (1829–1904)		Free Trade	MHA for West Devon (1893–1901)	14 April 1894	12 October 1899		5 years, 181 days	1897
12.	28th	Albert Ogilvie (1890–1939)		Labor	MHA for Franklin (1917–1939)	22 June 1934	11 June 1939		4 years, 354 days	1934 1937
13.	21st	Sir John Evans (1855–1943)		Conservatism	MHA for Kingborough (1897–1909)	12 July 1904	19 June 1909		4 years, 342 days	1906 1909
14.	26th	Joseph Lyons (1879–1939)		Labor	MHA for Wilmot (1909–1929)	25 October 1923	15 June 1928		4 years, 234 days	1925
15.	47th	Jeremy Rockliff (1970– )		Liberal	MHA for Braddon (2002– )	8 April 2022	Incumbent		4 years, 190 days	2024 2025
16.	42nd	Paul Lennon (1955– )		Labor	MHA for Franklin (1989–2008)	21 March 2004	26 May 2008		4 years, 66 days	2006
17.	39th	Ray Groom (1944– )		Liberal	MHA for Denison (1986–2001)	17 February 1992	18 March 1996		4 years, 30 days	1992 1996
18.	35th	Doug Lowe (1942– )		Labor	MHA for Franklin (1969–1986)	1 December 1977	11 November 1981		3 years, 345 days	1979
19.	6th	James Whyte (1820–1882)		No Party Alignment	MLC for Pembroke (1856–1876)	20 January 1863	24 November 1866		3 years, 308 days	
20.	4th	Sir Francis Smith (1819–1909)		No Party Alignment	MHA for Fingal (1857–1860)	12 May 1857	1 November 1860		3 years, 173 days	
21.	8th	Sir James Wilson (1812–1880)		No Party Alignment	MLC for Hobart (1859–1880)	4 August 1869	4 November 1872		3 years, 92 days	1871
22.	44th	Lara Giddings (1972– )		Labor	MHA for Franklin (2002– )	23 January 2011	31 March 2014		3 years, 67 days	
23.	10th	Alfred Kennerley (1810–1897)		No Party Alignment	MLC for Hobart (1865–1877)	4 August 1873	20 July 1876		2 years, 351 days	
24.	33rd	Sir Angus Bethune (1908–2004)		Liberal	MHA for Wilmot (1946–1975)	26 May 1969	3 May 1972		2 years, 343 days	1969
25.	7th	Sir Richard Dry (1815–1869)		No Party Alignment	MLC for Tamar (1862–1869)	24 November 1866	4 August 1869		2 years, 253 days	1866 1869
26.	34th	Bill Neilson (1925–1989)		Labor	MHA for Franklin (1941–1977)	31 March 1975	1 December 1977		2 years, 245 days	1976
27.	43rd	David Bartlett (1968– )		Labor	MHA for Denison (2004–2011)	26 May 2008	23 January 2011		2 years, 242 days	2010
28.	38th	Michael Field (1948– )		Labor	MHA for Braddon (1975–1997)	29 June 1989	17 February 1992		2 years, 233 days	1989
29.	40th	Tony Rundle (1939–2025)		Liberal	MHA for Braddon (1982–2002)	18 March 1996	14 September 1998		2 years, 180 days	
30.	46th	Peter Gutwein (1964– )		Liberal	MHA for Bass (2002–2022)	20 January 2020	8 April 2022		2 years, 78 days	2021
31.	22nd	John Earle (1865–1932)		Labor	MHA for Franklin (1909–1917)	20 October 1909	27 October 1909	7 days	2 years, 16 days	
31.	22nd	John Earle (1865–1932)		Labor	MHA for Franklin (1909–1917)	6 April 1914	15 April 1916	2 years, 9 days	2 years, 16 days	
32.	23rd	Albert Solomon (1876–1914)		Commonwealth Liberal	MHA for Bass (1909–1914)	14 June 1912	6 April 1914		1 year, 296 days	1913
33.	17th	Henry Dobson (1841–1918)		Conservatism	MHA for Brighton (1891–1900)	17 August 1892	14 April 1894		1 year, 240 days	1893
34.	14th	Sir Adye Douglas (1815–1906)		No Party Alignment	MHA for Fingal (1872–1886)	15 August 1884	8 March 1886		1 year, 205 days	
35.	5th	Thomas Chapman (1815–1884)		No Party Alignment	MHA for Queenborough (1861–1862); Campbell Town (1862-1864)	2 August 1861	20 January 1863		1 year, 171 days	1861
36.	20th	William Propsting (1861–1937)		Conservatism	MHA for North Hobart (1903–1906)	9 April 1903	12 July 1904		1 year, 94 days	
37.	16th	Sir James Agnew (1815–1901)		No Party Alignment	MHA for Macquarie (1886–1887)	8 March 1886	29 March 1887		1 year, 21 days	
38.	11th	Thomas Reibey (1821–1912)		No Party Alignment	MHA for Westbury (1874–1903)	20 July 1876	9 August 1877		1 year, 20 days	
39.	25th	John Hayes (1868–1956)		Nationalist	MHA for Bass (1913–1923)	12 August 1922	14 August 1923		1 year, 2 days	
40.	14th	Dr William Crowther (1817–1885); FRCS		No Party Alignment	MLC for Hobart (1866–1885)	20 December 1878	30 October 1879		314 days	
41.	3rd	William Weston (1804–1888)		No Party Alignment	MHA for Ringwood (1856–1857)	25 April 1857	12 May 1857	17 days	291 days	
41.	3rd	William Weston (1804–1888)		No Party Alignment	MHA for Ringwood (1856–1857)	1 November 1860	2 August 1861	274 days	291 days	
42.	9th	Frederick Innes (1816–1882)		No Party Alignment	MHA for Selby (1872–1873)	4 November 1872	4 August 1873		273 days	
43.	36th	Harry Holgate (1933–1997)		Labor	MHA for Bass (1972–1992)	11 November 1981	26 May 1982		196 days	
44.	29th	Edmund Dwyer-Gray (1870–1945)		Labor	MHA for Denison (1925–1945)	11 June 1939	18 December 1939		190 days	
45.	1st	William Champ (1808–1892)		No Party Alignment	MHA for Launceston (1856–1857)	1 November 1856	26 February 1857		117 days	
46.	31st	Edward Brooker (1891–1948)		Labor	MHA for Franklin (1931–1948)	18 December 1947	24 February 1948		68 days	
47.	2nd	Thomas Gregson (1796–1874)		No Party Alignment	MHA for Richmond (1856–1872)	26 February 1857	25 April 1857		58 days	

== See also ==
- Premier of Tasmania
- List of prime ministers of Australia by time in office
- List of Australian heads of government by time in office
- List of premiers of New South Wales by time in office
- List of premiers of Queensland by time in office
- List of premiers of South Australia by time in office
- List of premiers of Victoria by time in office
- List of premiers of Western Australia by time in office
- List of chief ministers of the Northern Territory by time in office
- List of chief ministers of the Australian Capital Territory by time in office
