= List of premiers of South Australia by time in office =

This is a list of premiers of South Australia by time in office. The basis of the list is the inclusive number of years and days between dates.

== Rank by time in office ==
Parties

Australian Labor Party Liberal Party of Australia Liberal and Country League / Liberal Federation Non-Party Conservatism Non-Party Liberalism

Rank	No.	Officeholder	Portrait	Party	District	Assumed office	Left office	Time in office (term)	Time in office (total)	Election wins
1.	33rd	Sir Thomas Playford (1896–1981)		Liberal & Country League	MP for Murray (1933–1938); Gumeracha (1938–1968)	5 November 1938	10 March 1965		26 years, 125 days	1941 1944; 1947; 1950 1953; 1956; 1959 1962
2.	39th	John Bannon (1943–2015)		Labor	MP for Ross Smith (1977–1993)	10 November 1982	4 September 1992		9 years, 299 days	1982 1985; 1989
3.	44th	Mike Rann (1953– )		Labor	MP for Ramsay (1993–2012)	5 March 2002	21 October 2011		9 years, 230 days	2002 2006; 2010
4.	35th	Don Dunstan (1926–1999)		Labor	MP for Norwood (1953–1979)	1 June 1967	17 April 1968	321 days	9 years, 214 days	1970 1973; 1975; 1977
4.	35th	Don Dunstan (1926–1999)		Labor	MP for Norwood (1953–1979)	2 June 1970	15 February 1979	8 years, 258 days	9 years, 214 days	1970 1973; 1975; 1977
5.	31st	Sir Richard Butler (1885–1966)		Liberal & Country League	MP for Wooroora (1921–1938); Light (1938–1938)	8 April 1927	17 April 1930	3 years, 9 days	8 years, 210 days	1927 1933; 1938
5.	31st	Sir Richard Butler (1885–1966)		Liberal & Country League	MP for Wooroora (1921–1938); Light (1938–1938)	18 April 1933	5 November 1938	5 years, 201 days	8 years, 210 days	1927 1933; 1938
6.	25th	Archibald Peake (1859–1920)		Liberal & Democratic Union	MP for Victoria & Albert (1902–1915); Alexandra (1915–1920)	5 June 1909	3 June 1910	363 days	6 years, 312 days	1912 1918
6.	25th	Archibald Peake (1859–1920)		Liberal Union	MP for Victoria & Albert (1902–1915); Alexandra (1915–1920)	17 February 1912	3 April 1915	3 years, 45 days	6 years, 312 days	1912 1918
6.	25th	Archibald Peake (1859–1920)		Liberal Union	MP for Victoria & Albert (1902–1915); Alexandra (1915–1920)	14 July 1917	8 April 1920	2 years, 269 days	6 years, 312 days	1912 1918
7.	20th	Charles Kingston (1850–1908)		Non-Party; Liberalism	MP for West Adelaide (1881–1900)	16 June 1893	1 December 1899		6 years, 168 days	1893 1896; 1899
8.	45th	Jay Weatherill (1964– )		Labor	MP for Cheltenham (2002–2018)	21 October 2011	19 March 2018		6 years, 149 days	2014
9.	42nd	John Olsen (1945– )		Liberal	MP for Kavel (1992–2002)	28 November 1996	22 October 2001		4 years, 328 days	1997
10.	47th	Peter Malinauskas (1980– )		Labor	Member of the Legislative Council (2015–2018); MP for Croydon (2018– )	21 March 2022	Incumbent		4 years, 196 days	2022 2026
11.	8th	Sir Henry Ayers (1821–1897)		No Party Alignment	Member of the Legislative Council (1857–1893)	15 July 1863	4 August 1864	1 year, 20 days	4 years, 34 days	
11.	8th	Sir Henry Ayers (1821–1897)		No Party Alignment	Member of the Legislative Council (1857–1893)	20 September 1865	23 October 1865	33 days	4 years, 34 days	
11.	8th	Sir Henry Ayers (1821–1897)		No Party Alignment	Member of the Legislative Council (1857–1893)	3 May 1867	24 September 1868	1 year, 144 days	4 years, 34 days	
11.	8th	Sir Henry Ayers (1821–1897)		No Party Alignment	Member of the Legislative Council (1857–1893)	13 October 1868	3 November 1868	21 days	4 years, 34 days	
11.	8th	Sir Henry Ayers (1821–1897)		No Party Alignment	Member of the Legislative Council (1857–1893)	22 January 1872	22 July 1873	1 year, 151 days	4 years, 34 days	
12.	28th	Sir Henry Barwell (1877–1959)		Liberal Federation	MP for Stanley (1915–1925)	8 April 1920	16 April 1924		4 years, 8 days	1921
13.	46th	Steven Marshall (1968– )		Liberal	MP for Norwood (2010–2014); Dunstan (2014–)	19 March 2018	21 March 2022		4 years, 2 days	2018
14.	17th	Thomas Playford (1837–1915)		No Party Alignment	MP for Newcastle (1887–1890); East Torrens (1890–1894)	11 June 1887	27 June 1889	2 years, 16 days	3 years, 323 days	
14.	17th	Thomas Playford (1837–1915)		No Party Alignment	MP for Newcastle (1887–1890); East Torrens (1890–1894)	19 August 1890	21 June 1892	1 year, 307 days	3 years, 323 days	
15.	24th	Thomas Price (1852–1909)		Labor	MP for Torrens (1902–1909)	26 July 1905	5 June 1909		3 years, 314 days	1905 1906
16.	22nd	John Jenkins (1851–1923)		Non-Party; Liberalism	MP for Torrens (1901–1905)	15 May 1901	1 March 1905		3 years, 290 days	1902
17.	13th	Lionel Hill (1881–1963)		Labor	MP for Port Pirie (1918–1933)	28 August 1926	8 April 1927	223 days	3 years, 160 days	1930
17.	13th	Lionel Hill (1881–1963)		Labor	MP for Port Pirie (1918–1933)	17 April 1930	14 August 1931	1 year, 119 days	3 years, 160 days	1930
17.	13th	Lionel Hill (1881–1963)		Parliamentary Labor	MP for Port Pirie (1918–1933)	14 August 1931	13 February 1933	1 year, 183 days	3 years, 160 days	1930
18.	38th	Dr David Tonkin (1929–2000)		Liberal	MP for Bragg (1970–1983)	18 September 1979	10 November 1982		3 years, 53 days	1979
19.	11th	Sir James Boucaut (1831–1916)		No Party Alignment	MP for Encounter Bay (1875–1878)	28 March 1866	3 May 1867	1 year, 36 days	3 years, 10 days	
19.	11th	Sir James Boucaut (1831–1916)		No Party Alignment	MP for Encounter Bay (1875–1878)	3 June 1875	6 June 1876	1 year, 3 days	3 years, 10 days	
19.	11th	Sir James Boucaut (1831–1916)		No Party Alignment	MP for Encounter Bay (1875–1878)	26 October 1877	27 September 1878	336 days	3 years, 10 days	
20.	15th	Sir John Bray (1842–1894)		No Party Alignment	MP for East Adelaide (1871–1892)	24 June 1881	16 June 1884		2 years, 358 days	
21.	41st	Dean Brown (1943– )		Liberal	MP for Finniss (1993–2006)	14 December 1993	28 November 1996		2 years, 350 days	1993
22.	14th	Sir William Morgan (1828–1883)		No Party Alignment	Member of the Legislative Council (1867–1884)	27 September 1878	24 June 1881		2 years, 270 days	
23.	9th	Sir Arthur Blyth (1823–1891)		No Party Alignment	MP for Gumeracha (1857–1868)	4 August 1864	22 March 1865	230 days	2 years, 254 days	
23.	9th	Sir Arthur Blyth (1823–1891)		No Party Alignment	MP for Gumeracha (1870–1875)	10 November 1871	22 January 1872	73 days	2 years, 254 days	
23.	9th	Sir Arthur Blyth (1823–1891)		No Party Alignment	MP for Gumeracha (1870–1875)	22 July 1873	3 June 1875	1 year, 316 days	2 years, 254 days	
24.	16th	Sir John Downer (1843–1915)		No Party Alignment	MP for Barossa (1878–1901)	16 June 1885	11 June 1887	1 year, 360 days	2 year, 239 days	
24.	16th	Sir John Downer (1843–1915)		Non-Party; Conservatism	MP for Barossa (1878–1901)	15 October 1892	16 June 1893	244 days	2 year, 239 days	
25.	4th	Sir Richard Hanson (1805–1876)		No Party Alignment	MP for Adelaide (1857–1861)	30 September 1857	9 May 1860		2 years, 222 days	
26.	13th	Sir John Colton (1823–1902)		No Party Alignment	MP for Noarlunga (1875–1878) (1889–1887)	6 June 1876	26 October 1877	1 year, 142 days	2 years, 142 days	
26.	13th	Sir John Colton (1823–1902)		No Party Alignment	MP for Noarlunga (1875–1878) (1889–1887)	16 June 1884	16 June 1885	1 year, 0 days	2 years, 142 days	
27.	29th	John Gunn (1884–1959)		Labor	MP for Adelaide (1918–1926)	16 April 1924	28 August 1926		2 years, 134 days	1924
28.	27th	Crawford Vaughan (1874–1947)		Labor	MP for Sturt (1915–1918)	3 April 1915	13 February 1917	1 year, 316 days	2 years, 102 days	1915
28.	27th	Crawford Vaughan (1874–1947)		National Labor	MP for Sturt (1915–1918)	13 February 1917	14 July 1917	151 days	2 years, 102 days	1915
29.	34th	Frank Walsh (1897–1968)		Labor	MP for Edwardstown (1956–1968)	10 March 1965	1 June 1967		2 years, 83 days	1965
30.	36th	Steele Hall (1928–2024)		Liberal & Country League	MP for Gouger (1959–1973)	17 April 1968	2 June 1970		2 years, 46 days	1968
31.	10th	John Hart (1809–1873)		No Party Alignment	MP for Port Adelaide (1862–1866); Light (1868–1870); The Burra (1870–1873)	23 October 1865	28 March 1866	156 days	1 year, 339 days	
31.	10th	John Hart (1809–1873)		No Party Alignment	MP for Port Adelaide (1862–1866); Light (1868–1870); The Burra (1870–1873)	24 September 1868	13 October 1868	19 days	1 year, 339 days	
31.	10th	John Hart (1809–1873)		No Party Alignment	MP for Port Adelaide (1862–1866); Light (1868–1870); The Burra (1870–1873)	30 May 1870	10 November 1871	1 year, 164 days	1 year, 339 days	
32.	19th	Sir Frederick Holder (1850–1909)		No Party Alignment	MP for Burra (1887–1901)	21 June 1892	15 October 1892	116 days	1 year, 274 days	
32.	19th	Sir Frederick Holder (1850–1909)		Non-Party; Liberalism	MP for Burra (1887–1901)	8 December 1899	15 May 1901	1 year, 158 days	1 year, 274 days	
33.	6th	George Waterhouse (1824–1906)		No Party Alignment	Member of the Legislative Council (1860–1864)	8 October 1861	4 July 1863		1 year, 269 days	
34.	26th	John Verran (1856–1932)		Labor	MP for Wallaroo (1901–1918)	3 June 1910	17 February 1912		1 year, 259 days	1910
35.	12th	Henry Strangways (1832–1920)		No Party Alignment	MP for West Torrens (1862–1871)	3 November 1868	30 May 1870		1 year, 208 days	
36.	5th	Thomas Reynolds (1818–1875)		No Party Alignment	MP for Adelaide (1860–1862)	9 May 1860	8 October 1861		1 year, 152 days	
37.	40th	Lynn Arnold (1949– )		Labor	MP for Ramsay (1985–1993)	4 September 1992	14 December 1993		1 year, 101 days	
38.	18th	Sir John Cockburn (1850–1929)		No Party Alignment	MP for Mount Barker (1887–1898)	27 June 1889	19 August 1890		1 year, 53 days	1890
39.	1st	Boyle Travers Finniss (1807–1893)		No Party Alignment	MP for Adelaide (1857–1860)	24 October 1856	21 August 1857		301 days	
40.	37th	Des Corcoran (1928–2004)		Labor	MP for Hartley (1977–1982)	15 February 1979	18 September 1979		215 days	
41.	7th	Francis Dutton (1818–1877)		No Party Alignment	MP for Light (1862–1865)	4 July 1863	15 July 1863	11 days	193 days	
41.	7th	Francis Dutton (1818–1877)		No Party Alignment	MP for Light (1862–1865)	22 March 1865	20 September 1865	182 days	193 days	
42.	23rd	Sir Richard Butler (1850–1925)		Non-Party; Conservatism	MP for Barossa (1902–1924)	1 March 1905	26 July 1905		147 days	
43.	43rd	Rob Kerin (1954– )		Liberal	MP for Frome (1993–2008)	22 October 2001	5 March 2002		134 days	
44.	32nd	Robert Richards (1885–1967)		Parliamentary Labor	MP for Wallaroo (1918–1949)	13 February 1933	18 April 1933		64 days	
45.	3rd	Sir Robert Torrens (1814–1884)		No Party Alignment	MP for Adelaide (1857–1858)	1 September 1857	30 September 1857		29 days	
46.	2nd	John Baker (1813–1872)		No Party Alignment	Member of the Legislative Council (1857–1861)	21 August 1857	1 September 1857		11 days	
47.	21st	Vaiben Louis Solomon (1853–1908)		Non-Party; Conservatism	MP for Northern Territory (1891–1901)	1 December 1899	8 December 1899		7 days	

== Total time in office of political parties in South Australia ==
South Australian Parliament – 62070 days as of 3 October 2026

=== Current parties ===
- Australian Labor Party – 21160 days as of 3 October 2026.
- Liberal Party of Australia – 5619 days.

=== Other parties ===
- Conservative or Liberal (Pre 1975): 17415 days.
  - Liberal and Country League – 12427 days.
  - Liberal Federation – 2453 days.
  - Liberal Union – 2141 days.
  - Liberal and Democratic Union – 394 days.

=== Before political parties ===
- Independent – 13141 days
- Non-Party Conservatism – 401 days.
- Non-Party Liberalism – 4271 days.

== See also ==
- Premier of South Australia
- List of prime ministers of Australia by time in office
- List of Australian heads of government by time in office
- List of premiers of New South Wales by time in office
- List of premiers of Queensland by time in office
- List of premiers of Tasmania by time in office
- List of premiers of Victoria by time in office
- List of premiers of Western Australia by time in office
- List of chief ministers of the Northern Territory by time in office
- List of chief ministers of the Australian Capital Territory by time in office
