= List of chief ministers of the Northern Territory by time in office =

This is a list of chief ministers of the Northern Territory by time in office. The basis of the list is the inclusive number of days between dates.

== Rank by time in office ==
Parties

Australian Labor Party Country Liberal Party

Rank	Officeholder	Portrait	Party	District	Assumed office	Left office	Time in office (term)	Time in office (total)	Election wins
1.	Paul Everingham (1943–); AO		Country Liberal	MLA for Jingili (1974–1984)	13 August 1977	16 October 1984		7 years, 64 days	1980 1983
2.	Marshall Perron (1942–)		Country Liberal	MLA for Stuart Park (1974–1983); MLA for Fannie Bay (1983–1995)	13 July 1988	26 May 1995		6 years, 317 days	1990 1994
3.	Clare Martin (1952–)		Labor	MLA for Fannie Bay (1995–2008)	27 August 2001	26 November 2007		6 years, 91 days	2001 2005
4.	Michael Gunner (1976–)		Labor	MLA for Fannie Bay (2008–2022)	31 August 2016	13 May 2022		5 years, 255 days	2016 2020
5.	Paul Henderson (1962–)		Labor	MLA for Wanguri (1999–2013)	26 November 2007	29 August 2012		4 years, 277 days	2008
6.	Shane Stone (1950–)		Country Liberal	MLA for Port Darwin (1990–2000)	26 May 1995	8 February 1999		3 years, 258 days	1997
7.	Adam Giles (1973–)		Country Liberal	MLA for Braitling (2008–2016)	14 March 2013	31 August 2016		3 years, 170 days	
8.	Goff Letts (1928–2023); CBE AM		Country Liberal	MLA for Victoria River (1974–1977)	19 October 1974	13 August 1977		2 years, 267 days	1974 1977
9.	Denis Burke (1948–)		Country Liberal	MLA for Brennan (1994–2005)	8 February 1999	27 August 2001		2 years, 200 days	
10.	Lia Finocchiaro (1984–)		Country Liberal	MLA for Spillett	28 August 2024	Incumbent		2 years, 71 days	2024
11.	Stephen Hatton (1948–)		Country Liberal	MLA for Nightcliff (1983–2001)	13 May 1986	13 July 1988		2 years, 61 days	1987
12.	Natasha Fyles (1978–)		Labor	MLA for Nightcliff (2012–2024)	13 May 2022	21 December 2023		1 year, 222 days	
13.	Ian Tuxworth (1942–2020)		Country Liberal	MLA for Barkly (1974–1990)	16 October 1984	13 May 1986		1 year, 209 days	
14.	Eva Lawler (1962–)		Labor	MLA for Drysdale (2016–2024)	21 December 2023	28 August 2024		251 days	
15.	Terry Mills (1957–)		Country Liberal	MLA for Blain (1999–2014, 2016–2020)	29 August 2012	14 March 2013		197 days	2012

== See also ==
- Chief Minister of the Northern Territory
- List of prime ministers of Australia by time in office
- List of premiers of New South Wales by time in office
- List of premiers of Victoria by time in office
- List of premiers of Queensland by time in office
- List of premiers of South Australia by time in office
- List of premiers of Tasmania by time in office
- List of premiers of Western Australia by time in office
- List of chief ministers of the Australian Capital Territory by time in office
