= Raymond Hyatt =

Australian politician

Member of the Victorian Legislative Assembly for Warrenheip and Grenville
- In office 12 June 1943 – 3 October 1945
- Preceded by: Edmond Hogan
- Succeeded by: District abolished

Member of the Victorian Legislative Assembly for Hampden
- In office 10 November 1945 – 9 October 1947
- Preceded by: William Cumming
- Succeeded by: Henry Bolte

Personal details
- Born: John Allison Raymond Hyatt; 28 July 1893 Blakeville, Victoria
- Died: 29 March 1969 (aged 75) Ballarat, Victoria, Australia
- Resting place: Ballarat Crematorium
- Party: Labor Party
- Spouse: Elizabeth Stratton (m. 1917)
- Children: Four
- Occupation: Postal worker

Military service
- Allegiance: Australia
- Branch/service: Australian Imperial Force
- Years of service: 1915–1916
- Rank: Private
- Unit: 14th Battalion

John Allison Raymond Hyatt (28 July 1893 – 29 March 1969) was an Australian politician.

Born in Blakeville to sawmiller Henry Hyatt and Elizabeth Dalton, he attended Blakeville State School and became a sawmiller and timber contractor. He served in the Australian Imperial Force's 14th Battalion in Egypt and France during World War I; on 22 December 1917 he married Elizabeth Stratton, with whom he had four children. Returning from the war in 1918 he became a postal worker, and became involved in the Postal Workers' Union. In 1943 he was elected to the Victorian Legislative Assembly as the Labor member for Warrenheip and Grenville, transferring to Hampden in 1945. He was defeated in 1947. Hyatt died at Ballarat in 1969.

Victorian Legislative Assembly
Preceded by Edmond Hogan	Member for Warrenheip and Grenville; 1943–1945	District abolished
Preceded by William Cumming	Member for Hampden; 1945–1947	Succeeded by Henry Bolte
