= George Holden (Victorian politician) =

Australian politician

George Frederick Holden (26 May 1868 – 15 August 1934) was a politician in Victoria, Australia, member of the Legislative Assembly of Victoria for the seat of Warrenheip from 1900 to 1913 and chairman of Melbourne Harbor Trust.

== History ==
Holden was born in Geelong, Victoria, the second son of Thomas Holden, merchant, and his wife Mary Holden, née Hague. His father became a town councillor for Geelong.

He attended school in Geelong, then was employed by his uncle George Hague, who had a woolbroking firm in Geelong. In 1886 he left for Wallace to manage a produce store owned by his father. The business prospered and in 1897 he was able to purchase the store.

In 1806 he was elected to the Buninyong Shire Council, a seat he held until 1904, when he retired. He was elected president of the Council in 1808. He was returned to the Legislative Assembly as member for Warrenheip in May 1900. He was highly esteemed for his discretion and sound business sense, and in December 1905 the Bent ministry appointed him chairman of commissioners of the newly formed Geelong Harbour Trust. He was appointed chairman of the Melbourne Harbour Trust commissioners on 4 February 1913.

He died at his home in South Yarra and his remains buried at the Eastern cemetery, Geelong.

== Family ==
On 6 June 1889 Holden married Minnie Elizabeth Ireson (died 30 April 1920). Their children include:

- Frederick Charles Thomas Holden, known as "Charles" or "Charlie" Holden, MLA for Grant.
- Eva Holden married Heinrich James Eberhard ("Rex") Thiemeyer on 3 November 1914
- Doris Holden married Frank Evans on the 16 February 1921

They had a residence on Punt road, South Yarra. His siblings include:

- Rev. Albert Thomas Holden (21 August 1866 – 20 August 1935)
- Percy Hague Holden (1869–1945), was sub-collector of customs at Geelong
- Mary Louise Elizabeth Holden (1873 – 6 September 1946) married Rev. Samuel John Hoban
- Arthur John Holden (1875–1956), alderman (and mayor 1915/16) of Geelong corporation, Rear Commodore of the Royal Geelong Yacht Club

Victorian Legislative Assembly
Preceded by Edward Murphy	Member for Warrenheip; 1900–1913	Succeeded by Edmond Hogan
