= Blakeville =

- Suburb
- Interactive map of Blakeville
- Coordinates: 37.4775°S 144.210556°E
- Country: Australia
- State: Victoria
- LGA: Shire of Moorabool

Government
  - State electorate: Eureka
  - Federal division: Hawke

Population
  - Total: 43 (2021 census)
- Postcode: 3342

Blakeville is a locality in the Shire of Moorabool, Victoria, Australia.

== History ==
Blakeville was a timbercutting township located south of the Wombat State Forest. The settlement was founded in 1864 and named for Edward Blake who opened a sawmill near the Korweinguboora Creek. The mills closed around 1900.

== Demographics ==
At the 2021 census, Blakeville had a population of 43.
