= Electoral district of Warrenheip =

Former state electoral district of Victoria, Australia

Coordinates: 37°40′S 144°8′E

Warrenheip Victoria—Legislative Assembly
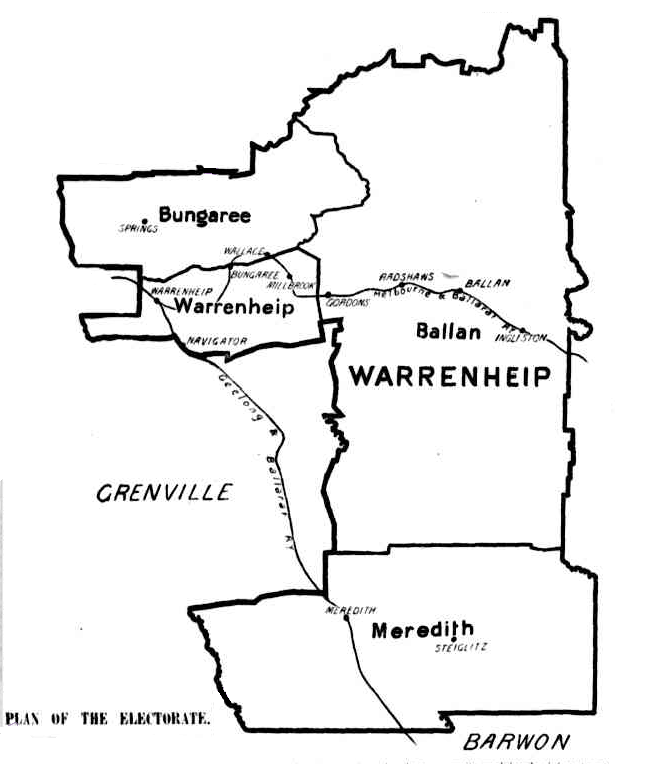
- Map of the electoral district of Warrenheip published in The Argus newspaper on 19 February 1913
- State: Victoria
- Created: 1889
- Abolished: 1927
- Demographic: Rural

The electoral district of Warrenheip was an electorate of the Victorian Legislative Assembly in the British colony, and later Australian state, of Victoria. Created in 1889, the electorate was abolished in 1927 when it became the electoral district of Warrenheip and Grenville.

== Members for Warrenheip ==
Member	Party	Term
Edward Murphy	none	1889–1900
George Holden	none	1900–1913
Edmond Hogan	Labor Party	1913–1927
