= William Cumming (politician) =

Australian politician

William Ronald Cumming (25 January 1886 – 30 October 1951) was an Australian politician.

He was born at Mount Fyans near Mortlake to grazier William Burrow Cumming and Adeline Catherine Affleck. He attended Geelong Grammar School and served with the 39th Battalion during World War I; he was awarded the Belgian Croix de Guerre. In 1914 he married Ava Irene Maidment Henty, with whom he had a son and three daughters; he would later marry Nora Lillian Crowe on 9 March 1944. On his return from the war he managed his father's property at Mount Fyans, which was sold in 1933. Cumming purchased land at Camperdown. He served on Mortlake Shire Council from 1924 to 1947, as president from 1932 to 1933. In 1935 he was elected to the Victorian Legislative Assembly as the United Australia Party member for Hampden. A supporter of Ian Macfarlan, he was Minister of Agriculture in the stop-gap Macfarlan Ministry of 1945, but was defeated at the subsequent election. In 1949 he moved to Peterborough, where he died in 1951.

Victorian Legislative Assembly
Preceded by Thomas Manifold	Member for Hampden; 1935–1945	Succeeded by Raymond Hyatt
