= Henry Bolte =

Australian politician (1908–1990)

The Honourable Sir Henry Bolte GCMG
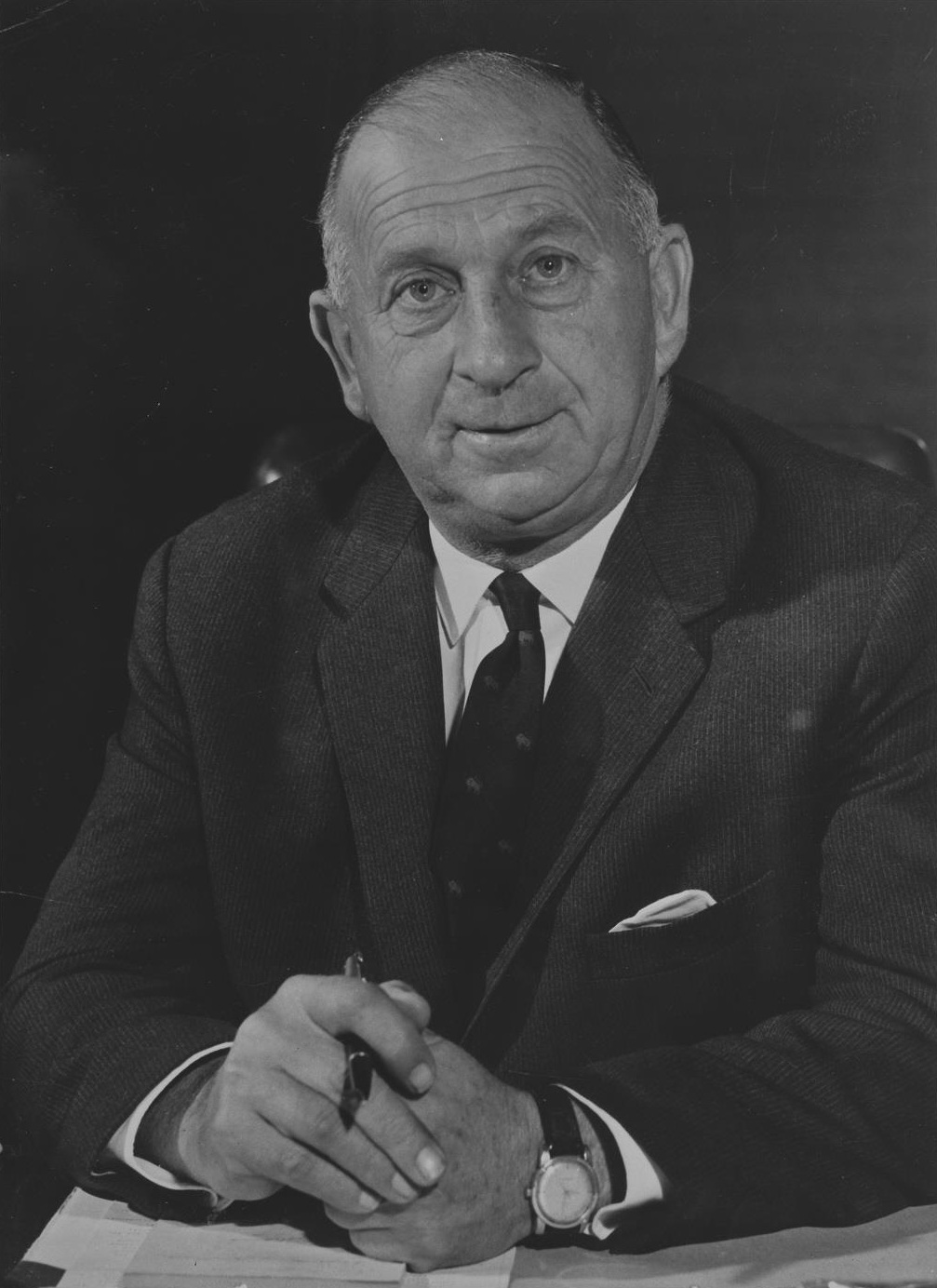
- Bolte in 1971.

38th Premier of Victoria
- In office 7 June 1955 – 23 August 1972
- Monarch: Elizabeth II
- Governor: Sir Dallas Brooks; Sir Rohan Delacombe
- Deputy: Sir Arthur Rylah; Dick Hamer
- Preceded by: John Cain (senior)
- Succeeded by: Dick Hamer

Member of the Victorian Parliament for Hampden
- In office 8 November 1947 – 24 August 1972
- Preceded by: Raymond Hyatt
- Succeeded by: Tom Austin

Personal details
- Born: 20 May 1908 Ballarat East, Victoria, Australia
- Died: 4 January 1990 (aged 81) Bamganie, Victoria, Australia
- Party: Liberal Party
- Spouse: Edith Lilian "Jill" Elder (m. 1934; died 1986)
- Occupation: Farmer

Sir Henry Edward Bolte (/ˈbɒlti/ BOL-tee; 20 May 1908 – 4 January 1990) was an Australian politician who served as the 38th premier of Victoria from 1955 to 1972. He held office as the leader of the Victorian division of the Liberal Party of Australia (LPA) and was a member of the Victorian Legislative Assembly (MLA) for the division of Hampden from 1947 to 1972. He is the longest-serving premier in Victorian state history, having been in office for over 17 consecutive years.

== Early years ==
Bolte was born on 20 May 1908 in Ballarat East, Victoria. He was the son of Anna Jane (née Martin) and James Henry Bolte. His father, a miner, was the son of German immigrants and his mother was also half-German.

Shortly after his birth, Bolte's parents moved the family to Skipton in the Western District where they ran a local pub, the Ripon Hotel. His mother's stepfather William Warren was also a hotel proprietor, running the Skipton Hotel until 1921 when he sold it to the Boltes. During World War I the family faced anti-German sentiment.

Bolte began his education at Skipton State School. He entered Ballarat Grammar School as a boarder in 1922 on a technical scholarship, attending alongside his future parliamentary colleagues Tom Hollway and Edward Montgomery. He left school in 1924 and returned to Skipton, where he had land dealings and ran a haberdashery shop established by his father. He was also active in community organisations, playing cricket and football for local teams, qualifying as a swimming instructor and serving as secretary of the local racing club. His store failed in 1929 and during the Great Depression he worked as a shearer to support himself.

In 1934, with money from his grandmother, Bolte purchased Kialla, a sheep farming property of 900 acres (360 ha) at Bamganie near Meredith. In his early years on the land he faced rabbit plague and supplemented his income by trapping and hunting rabbits. In August 1940, Bolte enlisted in the Militia as a gunner. He was stationed at Puckapunyal for periods as an artillery instructor and pay clerk, but was rejected for overseas service and discharged in January 1943.

== Parliamentary career ==
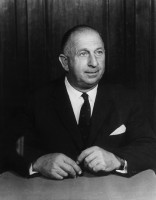
Premier Bolte in an undated photograph.

Bolte was founding president of the Liberal Party's Meredith branch in 1945 and was a delegate to its inaugural state council. He first stood for parliament at the 1945 state election, running unsuccessfully in the seat of Hampden, but reprised his candidacy in 1947 and defeated the incumbent Australian Labor Party (ALP) member Raymond Hyatt.

Victorian politics was volatile at this time, with a succession of weak short-term governments. The electoral system was malapportioned in favour of rural areas, which gave the Liberals' junior partner, the Country Party disproportionate power. As a rural Liberal, Bolte despised the Country Party nearly as much as the Labor Party. In April 1935, Country Party leader and Deputy Premier Albert Dunstan unexpectedly withdrew support for the Premier, Stanley Argyle, breaking the coalition agreement and forming a minority Country government, which Labor supported in return for some policy concessions.

When Bolte was elected to Parliament in 1947 the Liberal leader was Thomas Hollway, who also came from Ballarat but was somewhat less conservative than Bolte. In 1951 Hollway tried to reform the electoral system, which caused a split in the Liberal Party and his replacement by Les Norman, with Bolte as Deputy Leader. Norman would lose his seat to Hollway in 1952, and be replaced as leader by Trevor Oldham. When Oldham was killed on BOAC Flight 783 in May 1953, Bolte succeeded him.

The Labor Party under John Cain Sr. had come to power at the 1952 elections, but in 1955 the party suffered a split over the issue of communist influence in the trade unions. With Cain's government reeling, Bolte tabled a no-confidence motion on 19 April. The anti-communist Catholic MPs, who had organised as the Australian Labor Party (Anti-Communist), crossed the floor to support the no-confidence motion, bringing Cain down.

Due in large part to Labor (A-C) directing its second preferences to the Liberals, Bolte won the ensuing election with a huge majority, routing both Labor and the Country Party. There was little hint at the time that he would reverse the pattern of unstable government in Victoria; he headed the state's 11th government in 12 years. However, he was able to form the first stable non-Labor government in Victoria for many years.

Bolte was a rough-hewn politician who liked to be seen as a simple farmer, but he had a shrewd political mind. With the help of the expelled faction of the Labor Party, which became the Democratic Labor Party, Bolte was able to consolidate his position. Due in part to the DLP continuing to direct its preferences to the Liberals at elections, Bolte was reelected six times. His populist attacks on the trade unions, intellectuals, protesters and the press won him a large following. It peaked at the 1967 election, which saw the opposition reduced to just 28 seats (16 Labor and 12 Country) in total.

== Infrastructure building ==
Bolte used state debt to provide a wide range of state infrastructure and he was very successful at winning overseas investment for the state. Some of the large projects undertaken during his time in government were increased coal production and power generation in the Latrobe Valley, new offshore oil and gas fields in Gippsland, the West Gate Bridge over the lower Yarra River, a new international airport for Melbourne at Tullamarine and two new universities (Monash University and La Trobe University). The majority of these projects were facilitated, rather than funded, by the State government. Bolte was easily re-elected at the 1958, 1961 and 1964 state elections.

== Capital punishment controversy ==
Bolte was a proponent of using capital punishment as a deterrent against violent crime. Many believed he was foiled when Robert Peter Tait who had murdered Ada Hall, an elderly widow, at the Hawthorn vicarage where she lived with her son, and who subsequently had been sentenced to hang for the crime, was granted an eleventh-hour reprieve in 1962 after the High Court had found him insane.

Justice Starke subscribed to the substitute Tait theory, Starke had defended Tait but later on was the sentencing judge in the R v Ryan & Walker 1966. Starke said "After Bolte was denied with Tait he simply waited for the next cab off the ranks, and poor Ryan happened to be the next cab!"

In 1965, two prisoners, Ronald Ryan and Peter Walker, had escaped from Melbourne's Pentridge Prison, allegedly killing a prison guard in the process. They were recaptured, and Ryan was sentenced to death for murder. Bolte had the power to recommend clemency, but declined to exercise it, arguing that the death penalty was a necessary deterrent for crime against government officials and law enforcement officers.

All calls for clemency, petitions and protests were to no avail. Bolte was determined that the law be upheld. Ryan was hanged in February 1967. Bolte had said "If I thought the law was wrong I would change it".

A reporter at his daily press conference on the day of the hanging asked what he was doing at the time it took place. Bolte, replied: "One of the three Ss, I suppose." The reporter asked him what he meant. Bolte responded: "A shit, a shave or a shower." Peter Blazey later wrote 'For a man practically devoid of political or social idealism, the hanging had proved a way of tightening his control over cabinet, the party and the press.' Blazey also adds, however, that the Ryan hanging meant Bolte 'had become brutalized politically, even if he didn't know it...'

Bolte's insistence on having Ryan hanged earned him the opposition of the Melbourne press, particularly The Age, the churches, the universities and most of the legal profession. It also alienated sections of the Liberal Party and some members of his own Cabinet, including his eventual successor, Dick Hamer. But Bolte had correctly interpreted the populist appeal of his putative law-and-order stand, and at the 1967 elections the Liberals went from 38 of 66 seats in 1964 to 44 of 73 in 1967.

== Later career ==
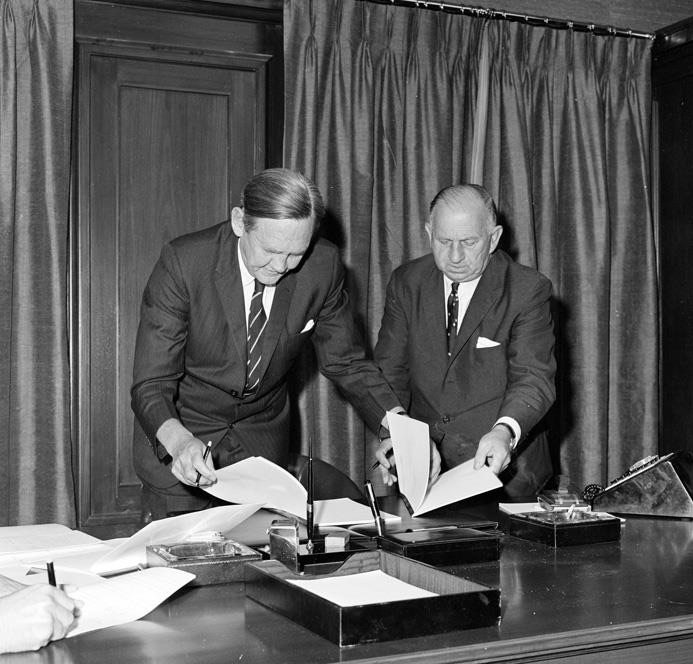
Bolte with Prime Minister John Gorton in February 1970.

After 1968, when Bolte turned 60, his appeal to younger urban voters declined, and he showed little sympathy with new issues such as the environment and civil liberties. His standing was also reduced by a crisis in the state education system, with teacher shortages and overcrowded schools as the children of the baby boom passed through the education system. The government recruited large numbers of American schoolteachers to deal with the shortage. At the same time the Labor Party began to revive under a new leader, Clyde Holding.

At the 1970 state elections the Liberals seemed in serious danger of losing office, or at least being forced into a coalition with the Country Party, but Bolte was saved by Holding's left-wing enemies in the Labor Party, who sabotaged his campaign by publicly opposing government funding for non-government schools (which Holding and Gough Whitlam had made Labor policy). Nevertheless, the Liberals lost six seats.

Bolte was promoted to Knight Grand Cross of the Order of St Michael and St George (GCMG) in the 1972 New Year Honours. Bolte on various occasions asked the prime minister, William McMahon, to approach the British authorities to have Bolte made a life peer of the UK Parliament. McMahon needed Bolte's political support, so he wrote to 10 Downing Street with a proposal, but it was declined.

As 1972 dawned, the Liberals lost further ground among younger voters in Melbourne. Bolte was shrewd enough to see that the Liberals had a year at most to broaden their appeal before a statutory general election, and concluded that they needed a new leader and a new image for the 1970s. In August 1972, he resigned, apparently with no regrets. He arranged for Deputy Premier Dick Hamer, a somewhat progressive Melbourne-based Liberal, to succeed him. Despite misgivings from the conservative wing of the party, Hamer became Liberal leader and premier. This proved a sound judgement, since Hamer went on to win three more elections for the Liberals.

== Retirement and death ==
After his resignation and retirement from Parliament, Bolte retired to his farm, 'Kialla', at Bamganie, near Meredith. When the Liberals lost government in Victoria to John Cain, Jr. Liberals in the Opposition would visit Bolte at his farm, "whisky bottle in hand, seeking consolation and advice."

On 24 March 1984, Bolte was involved in a serious head-on accident when he was driving home after an evening in the local hotel near his property at Bamganie. Bolte and the occupants of the other car were taken to the Ballarat Base Hospital, where blood samples were taken to test for alcohol levels. Whilst there was no evidence of alcohol in the blood of the other driver involved, there were indications of an alcohol content in excess of 0.05%, the legal limit in Victoria, in Bolte's blood. Further samples were subsequently collected from the hospital by the police, but these were found to have been substituted, and the sample box containing them had been unlocked by an unknown person. An enquiry found that it would have been unfair to proceed with prosecution because of interference with the evidence. Bolte later told author Tom Prior "Of course I know nothing, I was unconscious".

Bolte was deeply affected by the sudden death of his wife, Dame Edith, in 1986.

Bolte died at his home on 4 January 1990.

== Honours and memorials ==
Bolte was appointed a Knight Commander of the Order of St. Michael and St. George (KCMG) in the New Year's Day honours list of 1966. In the 1972 New Year Honours he was advanced to the rank of Knight Grand Cross (GCMG). Despite "his intense lobbying", Bolte failed to secure a peerage.

His wife, Lady Edith Lilian Bolte, known as Jill Bolte, was appointed a Dame Commander of the Order of the British Empire in the 1973 New Year Honours for "outstanding public service to Victoria".

A portrait of Bolte by William Dargie hangs in Queens Hall at Parliament House Victoria.

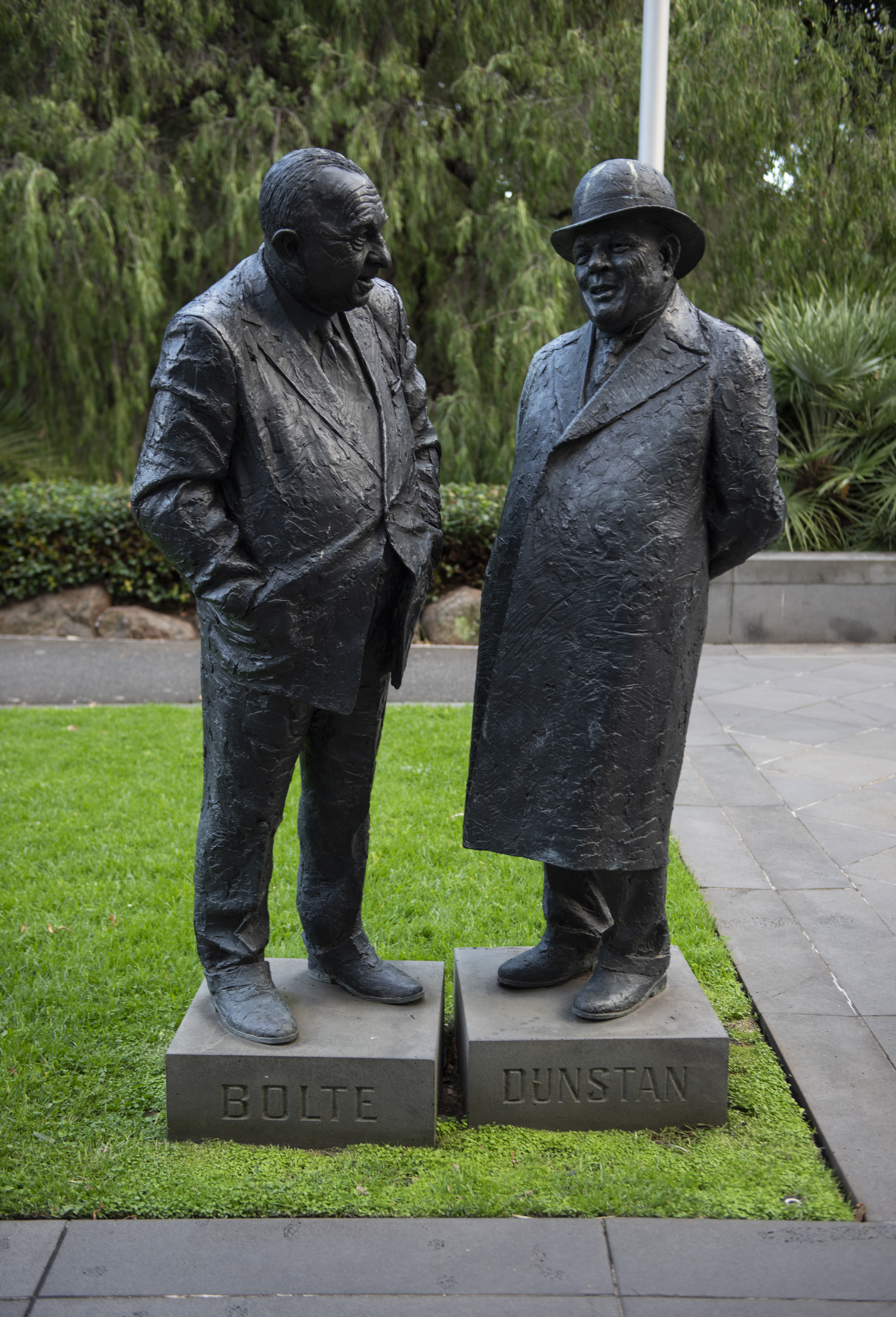
Henry Bolte and Albert Dunstan's statues at 1 Treasury Place, Melbourne

=== Bridge ===
The Bolte Bridge that spans Melbourne's Docklands is named after him.

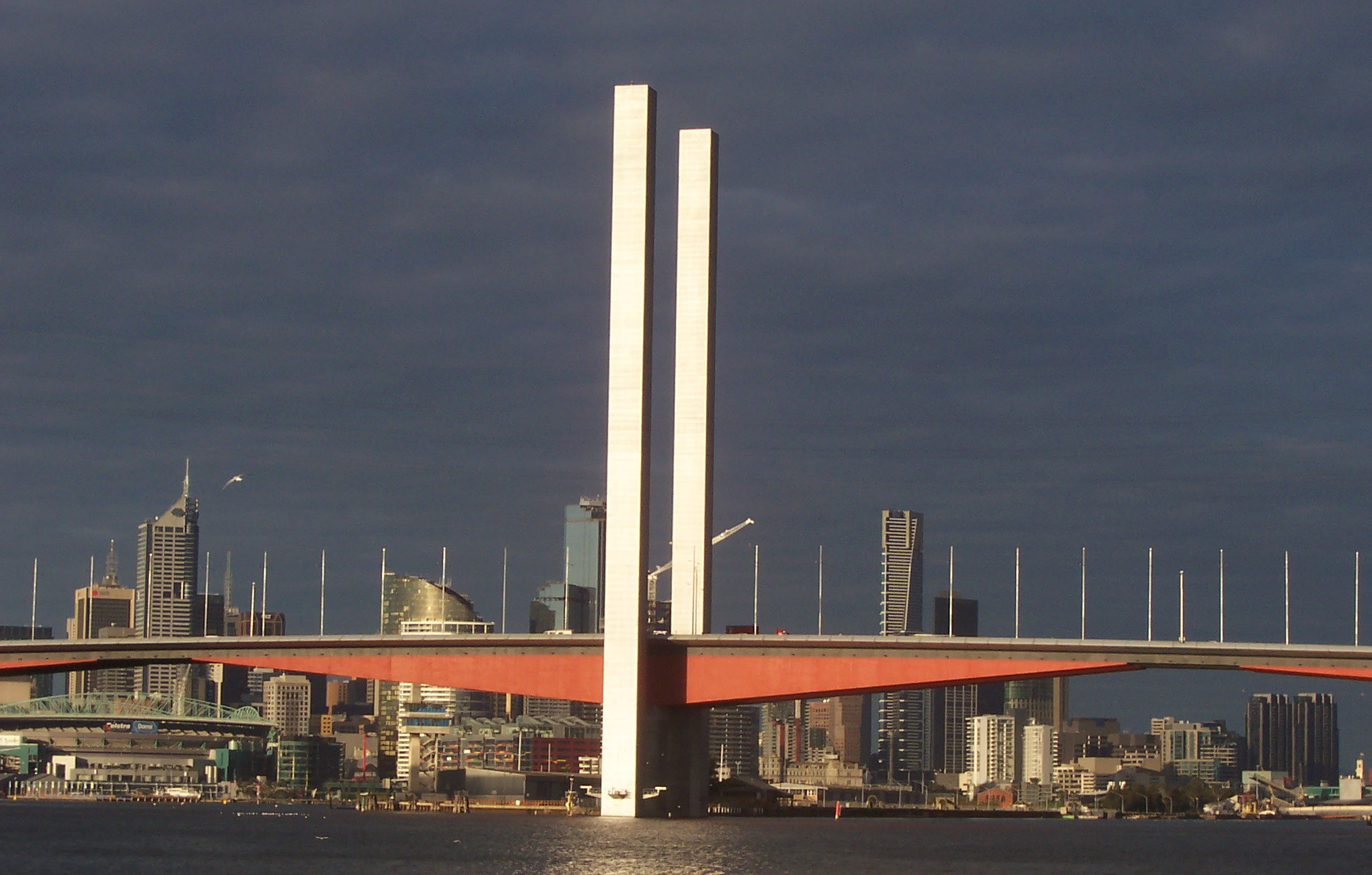
Bolte Bridge, looking back to the Melbourne CBD in June 2006

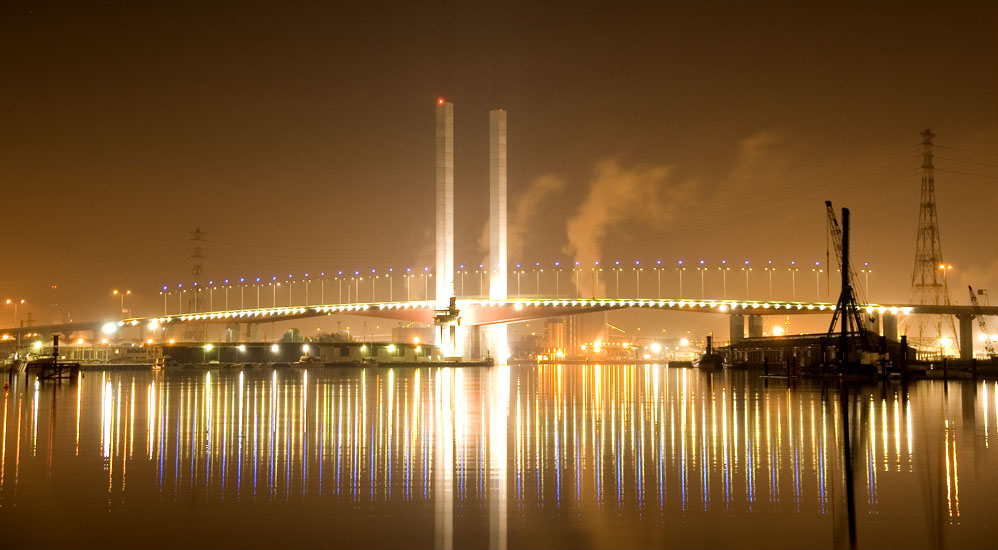
Bolte Bridge taken from Docklands in June 2005

Political offices
Preceded by John Cain, Sr.	Premier of Victoria; 1955–1972	Succeeded by Rupert Hamer
Party political offices
Preceded by Trevor Oldham	Leader of the Liberal Party in Victoria; 1953–1972	Succeeded by Rupert Hamer
