= Electoral district of Warrenheip and Grenville =

Former state electoral district of Victoria, Australia

Coordinates: 37°50′S 143°50′E

Warrenheip and Grenville Victoria—Legislative Assembly
- State: Victoria
- Created: 1927
- Abolished: 1945
- Demographic: Rural

The electoral district of Warrenheip and Grenville was an electorate of the Victorian Legislative Assembly in the Australian state of Victoria. Created in 1927 by the Electoral Districts Act 1926 after the abolition of the electoral district of Warrenheip, the electorate was abolished in 1945.

== Members for Warrenheip and Grenville ==
Member	Party	Term
Edmond Hogan	Labor Party	1927–1932
Edmond Hogan	Independent	1932–1935
Edmond Hogan	United Country Party	1935–1943
Raymond Hyatt	Labor Party	1943–1945
