= Thomas Chester Manifold =

Australian politician and racehorse breeder (1897–1979)

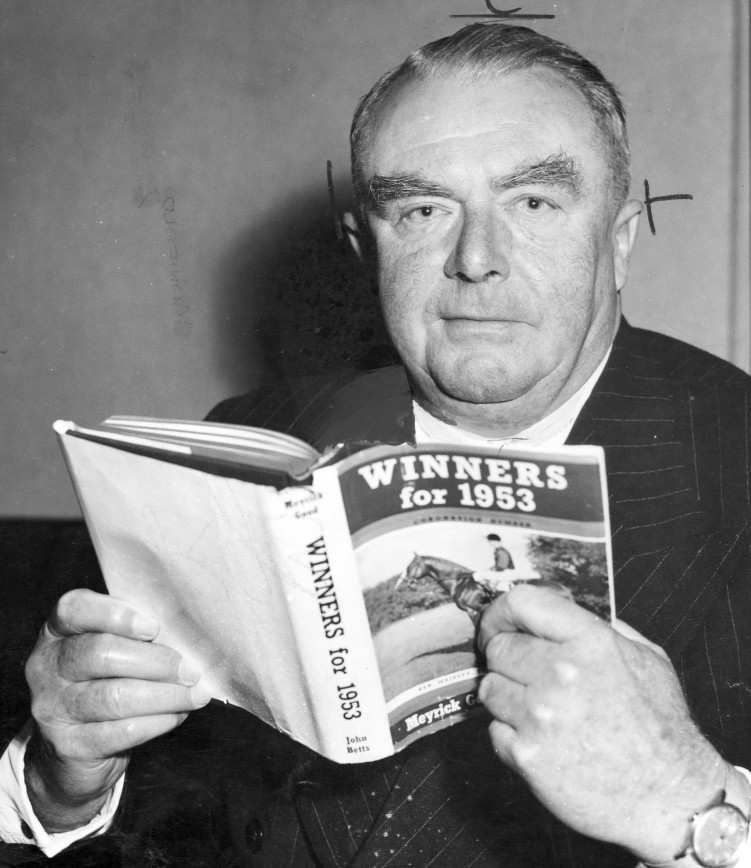
Sir Thomas Chester Manifold

Sir (Thomas) Chester Manifold KBE (13 May 1897 – 6 January 1979) was a prominent member of the Victorian Racing community as a successful racehorse owner and breeder. He also spent six years as a Victorian politician.

Manifold was born in Camperdown to James Chester Manifold and Lilian Eva Curle. Known by his middle name (Chester). He attended Geelong Grammar School and then studied economics at the University of Cambridge. During World War I he served with the Royal Field Artillery, and was wounded at Ypres in 1917. On his return to Australia in 1920 he worked for a stock and station agency, and on 22 May 1923 married Gwenda Grimwade, with whom he had three daughters. He managed the family property at Camperdown from 1922 and was based in Lismore from 1923 until the war. From 1926 to 1941 he served on Hampden Shire Council and was president from 1938 to 1940.

Manifold was elected to the Victorian Legislative Assembly for Hampden in 1929 as a Nationalist; he was a minister without portfolio from 1932 to 1933 but retired in 1935. During World War II he served in New Guinea as a lieutenant-colonel.

== Horse racing ==
Manifold was active in the racing community, particularly through the Victoria Racing Club. Against strong opposition from bookmakers and churches, he persuaded the Victorian government to set up the Victorian Totalisator Agency Board (TAB), replacing illegal off-course betting with a government monopoly which funded racing and other causes. He was first chairman of the Victorian TAB from 1961 to 1969. Chester was the owner of the famous jumper Crisp that came second in the English 1973 Grand National.

== Homestead ==
Manifold's property, "Talindert", was a successful horse stud. The homestead with 15 bedrooms and 1700 acres of prime farming land hosted Princess Alexandra when she visited in 1959. It was a mixed farm which besides the horse stud ran beef, sheep and dairy cows. Talindert Primary School No. 3644 block was donated by the Manifolds.

== Honours ==
Manifold was knighted in 1953 and made a Knight Commander of the Order of the British Empire in 1965.

== Death ==
Manifold died in Camperdown on 6 January 1979.

Victorian Legislative Assembly
Preceded by Arthur Hughes	Member for Hampden; 1929–1935	Succeeded by William Cumming
