= Edmond Hogan =

Australian politician

The Honourable Edmond John Hogan MP
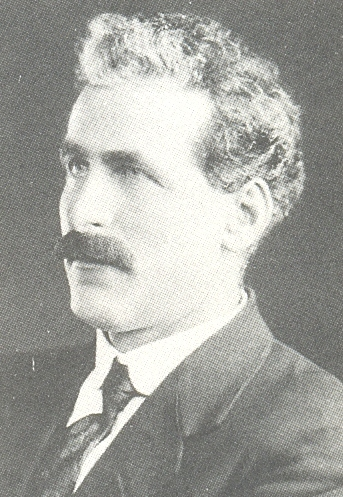

30th Premier of Victoria
- In office 12 December 1929 – 19 May 1932
- Monarch: George V
- Governor: Lord Somers
- Preceded by: Sir William McPherson
- Succeeded by: Sir Stanley Argyle
- In office 20 May 1927 – 22 November 1928
- Monarch: George V
- Governor: Lord Somers
- Preceded by: John Allan
- Succeeded by: Sir William McPherson

Leader of the Opposition in Victoria
- In office 22 November 1928 – 12 December 1929
- Premier: Sir William McPherson
- Preceded by: Sir William McPherson
- Succeeded by: Sir William McPherson
- In office 14 April 1926 – 20 May 1927
- Premier: John Allan
- Preceded by: George Prendergast
- Succeeded by: Sir William McPherson

Leader of the Labor Party in Victoria
- In office 14 April 1926 – 1 July 1932
- Deputy: Tom Tunnecliffe
- Preceded by: George Prendergast
- Succeeded by: Tom Tunnecliffe

Member of the Victorian Legislative Assembly for Warrenheip and Grenville
- In office 9 April 1927 – 12 June 1943
- Preceded by: Electorate established
- Succeeded by: Raymond Hyatt

Member of the Victorian Legislative Assembly for Warrenheip
- In office 28 February 1913 – 4 March 1927
- Preceded by: George Holden
- Succeeded by: Electorate abolished

Personal details
- Born: 12 December 1883 Wallace, Colony of Victoria
- Died: 23 August 1964 (aged 80) Melbourne, Victoria, Australia
- Party: Labor (until 1932); Independent (1932–1935); Country (after 1935)
- Spouse: Molly Conroy (m. 1917)
- Children: 3
- Profession: Timber worker; Unionist; Politician

Edmond John "Ned" Hogan (12 December 1883 – 23 August 1964) was an Australian politician who was the 30th Premier of Victoria. He was born in Wallace, Victoria, where his Irish-born parents were small farmers. After attending a Roman Catholic primary school, he became a farm worker and then a timber worker, and spent some time on the goldfields of Western Australia.

Hogan became active in trade union and Labor Party politics in Kalgoorlie. In 1912, he contracted typhoid. To recuperate, he returned to Victoria and took up farming at Ballan.

== Labor politics ==
In 1913, Hogan was elected to the Victorian Legislative Assembly for Warrenheip, an electorate near Ballarat, which was renamed Warrenheip and Grenville in 1927. Although it was not a natural Labor seat, it was heavily Irish-Catholic, which helped Hogan, an active Catholic, retain it for 30 years. In 1914, he was elected to the Labor Party's state executive, becoming state president in 1922.

Hogan was a fine speaker and soon became a leading figure in a parliamentary party which was thin on talent. Victoria was Labor's weakest state and in the 1920s there seemed little chance that it would ever win a state election in its own right; minority government status was as much as it could hope for at the time. This status it achieved in 1924, when Hogan became Minister for Agriculture and Railways in the short-lived minority government of George Prendergast. Two years later Prendergast resigned as leader, and Hogan was the obvious choice to succeed him. His main drawback was his close association with the Melbourne horse-racing, boxing and gambling identity John Wren, who was widely suspected of corruption. The Wren connection alienated many middle-class voters from Labor through the 1920s and 1930s.

Nevertheless, at the 1927 state election, Hogan was able to capitalise on resentment against rural over-representation in the state parliament, and the consequent domination by the Country Party. Labor won 28 seats to the Nationalists 15 and the Country Party's 10.

Hogan was able to form a government with the support of the four Country Progressive Party and two Liberal members. However, the alliance broke down in 1928 in the face of a prolonged and violent industrial dispute on the Melbourne waterfront, and in November his government was defeated in a confidence vote and he resigned, being succeeded by the Nationalist William Murray McPherson, who had the support of the Victorian Country Party.

In 1929, the Country Party withdrew its support from McPherson's administration and there was another election, fought just as the Great Depression was breaking over Australia. Hogan led Labor to its best result yet, winning 30 seats to the Nationalists' 17 and the Country Party's 11. A collection of Country Progressives, Liberals and independents held the balance of power, and they agreed to support a second Hogan government. Tom Tunnecliffe was Chief Secretary, John Cain was Minister for Railways and William Slater was Attorney-General.

The Depression had a particularly devastating effect on Victoria's economy and society, because the state was still more heavily dependent than the rest of Australia on agricultural exports, mainly wheat and wool, for its income; those industries collapsed almost completely as demand in Britain dried up. By 1931, most Victorian farmers were bankrupt and about 25 percent of the state's workforce was unemployed.

Hogan's government, in common with all other Australian state governments at the time, had no solution to the disaster. Even if it had been innately inclined to attempt radical solutions (which it was not), it depended on Country Progressive support in the Assembly, and had only six members in the Legislative Council.

Unlike New South Wales ALP Premier Jack Lang, Hogan adopted the orthodox economic view that governments must balance their budgets. Since the Legislative Council would not permit any increases in taxation, and since the ALP had no hope of controlling the council, the only way to balance budgets (in the face of falling government revenue) was to cut governmental expenditure. That increased the burdens on the poor and unemployed, while providing no stimulus to the economy. There was little possibility of effective unemployment relief, although there were some government works to soak up unemployment, such as the building of the Shrine of Remembrance and the Great Ocean Road.

In August 1930, Hogan attended a conference with the other Premiers and the Labor Prime Minister, James Scullin, to consider what to do. On the advice of Sir Otto Niemeyer, a senior official of the Bank of England (which controlled most of Victoria's access to credit in the City of London), they agreed to radical cuts to government spending and borrowing. This provoked a storm of protest in the trade unions and among many sections of the Labor Party, which regarded Scullin and Hogan as traitors.

During June 1931, a second conference produced the Premiers' Plan, which entailed further cuts in government spending, accompanied by increases in taxation on the wealthy. In the circumstances, both of those measures further depressed the economy, while not satisfying either side of politics. The New South Wales Labor Party, led by Lang, rebelled; in November, Lang's supporters in the federal parliament voted to bring down the Scullin government. Nevertheless, Hogan's government survived because the Country Party continued to support it from the cross-benches. As well, the Nationalists, now renamed the United Australia Party (UAP), preferred to see Hogan implement the Premiers' Plan.

In February 1932, Hogan travelled to London to talk to the banks about Victoria's desperate economic plight. While he was away, Tom Tunnecliffe was acting Premier, and he was much more willing than Hogan to reject the Premiers' Plan. As a result, the Country Party withdrew its support for the ALP; and in April, the government was defeated in a confidence vote.

Tunnecliffe replaced Hogan as Labor leader and led the Labor campaign in the May election, now rejecting the Premiers' Plan completely. The Labor Party executive expelled everyone who had supported the Premiers' Plan, including Hogan, although it did not run a candidate against him in Warrenheip and Grenville. At the elections the UAP won 31 seats to Labor's 16 and the reunited Country Party's 14. Hogan and one of his ex-ministers were elected as "Premiers' Plan Labor" candidates. The UAP's Sir Stanley Argyle became Premier.

After sitting as an independent for three years, Hogan joined the Country Party in 1935, and soon formed a good working relationship with the Country Party leader Albert Dunstan. The result was a renewed alliance between the Country Party and Labor, brokered by Hogan, John Wren and the Victorian Labor State President, Arthur Calwell. In April 1935, Dunstan brought an end to Argyle's government, and became Premier with Labor support. Hogan was appointed Minister for Agriculture and Mines, and held those posts through Dunstan's record term as Premier, which lasted until September 1943.

At the 1943 election, after 30 years in parliament, the 60-year-old Hogan was defeated in Warrenheip and Grenville by the Labor candidate. Playing no more part in politics, he retired to St Kilda in Melbourne, where he lived until his death in 1964, aged 81. He was interred in a modest lawn grave at the Cheltenham Memorial Park (Wangara Road).

== Sources ==
- Australian Dictionary of Biography (Online Edition)
- Geoff Browne, A Biographical Register of the Victorian Parliament, 1900–84, Government Printer, Melbourne, 1985
- Don Garden, Victoria: A History, Thomas Nelson, Melbourne, 1984
- Kathleen Thompson and Geoffrey Serle, A Biographical Register of the Victorian Parliament, 1856–1900, Australian National University Press, Canberra, 1972
- Kate White, John Cain and Victorian Labour 1917–1957, Hale and Iremonger, Sydney, 1982
- Raymond Wright, A People's Counsel. A History of the Parliament of Victoria, 1856–1990, Oxford University Press, Melbourne, 1992

Victorian Legislative Assembly
Preceded by George Holden	Member for Warrenheip; 1913–1927	District abolished
District created	Member for Warrenheip and Grenville; 1927–1943	Succeeded by Raymond Hyatt
Political offices
Preceded by John Allan	Premier of Victoria; 1927–1928	Succeeded by William McPherson
Preceded by William McPherson	Premier of Victoria; 1929–1932	Succeeded by Stanley Argyle
Party political offices
Preceded by George Prendergast	Leader of the Labor Party in Victoria; 1926–1932	Succeeded by Tom Tunnecliffe
