= Members of the Australian Capital Territory Legislative Assembly, 2016–2020 =

Members of the Australian Capital Territory Legislative Assembly, 2016–2020

This is a list of members of the ninth Australian Capital Territory Legislative Assembly, as elected at and subsequent to the October 2016 election.

Name	Party	Electorate	Term in office
Andrew Barr	ALP	Kurrajong	2006–present
Yvette Berry	ALP	Ginninderra	2012–present
Candice Burch ^{[1]}	Liberal	Kurrajong	2017–2020
Joy Burch	ALP	Brindabella	2008–2024
Tara Cheyne	ALP	Ginninderra	2016–present
Bec Cody	ALP	Murrumbidgee	2016–2020
Alistair Coe	Liberal	Yerrabi	2008–2021
Steve Doszpot ^{[1]}	Liberal	Kurrajong	2008–2017
Vicki Dunne	Liberal	Ginninderra	2001–2020
Meegan Fitzharris ^{[2]}	ALP	Yerrabi	2015–2019
Mick Gentleman	ALP	Brindabella	2004–2008, 2012–2024
Deepak-Raj Gupta ^{[2]}	ALP	Yerrabi	2019–2020
Jeremy Hanson	Liberal	Murrumbidgee	2008–present
Giulia Jones	Liberal	Murrumbidgee	2012–2022
Elizabeth Kikkert	Liberal	Ginninderra	2016–2024
Nicole Lawder	Liberal	Brindabella	2013–2024
Caroline Le Couteur	Greens	Murrumbidgee	2008–2012, 2016–2020
Elizabeth Lee	Liberal	Kurrajong	2016–present
James Milligan	Liberal	Yerrabi	2016–2020, 2021–present
Suzanne Orr	ALP	Yerrabi	2016–present
Mark Parton	Liberal	Brindabella	2016–present
Michael Pettersson	ALP	Yerrabi	2016–present
Gordon Ramsay	ALP	Ginninderra	2016–2020
Shane Rattenbury	Greens	Kurrajong	2008–present
Chris Steel	ALP	Murrumbidgee	2016–present
Rachel Stephen-Smith	ALP	Kurrajong	2016–present
Andrew Wall	Liberal	Brindabella	2012–2020

^{1} Kurrajong Liberal MLA Steve Doszpot died on 25 November 2017. He was replaced after a countback on 13 December 2017 by Candice Burch.
^{2} Yerrabi Labor MLA Meegan Fitzharris resigned on 8 July 2019. She was replaced after a countback on 23 July 2019 by Deepak-Raj Gupta.

== See also ==
- 2016 Australian Capital Territory election
