= Third Barr ministry =

2020 cabinet of the Australian Capital Territory

Third Barr Ministry
- 15th Ministry of the Australian Capital Territory
- Date formed: 4 November 2020
- Date dissolved: 7 November 2024

People and organisations
- Chief Minister: Andrew Barr
- Deputy Chief Minister: Yvette Berry
- No. of ministers: 9
- Member parties: Australian Labor Party (Australian Capital Territory Branch); ACT Greens
- Status in legislature: Coalition majority government 16/25
- Opposition party: Liberal
- Opposition leader: Elizabeth Lee

History
- Legislature term: 10th
- Predecessor: Second Barr Ministry
- Successor: Fourth Barr ministry

The Third Barr Ministry was the 15th ministry of the Government of the Australian Capital Territory, led by Labor Chief Minister Andrew Barr and his deputy Yvette Berry. It was appointed on 4 November 2020 to replace the Second Barr Ministry, following the 2020 general election held two weeks earlier.

On 23 October 2020, the Greens, who won 6 seats in the election and were in a coalition with Labor for the past two parliamentary terms, announced they were prepared to continue the coalition with Labor. However, they also requested that Barr create seats in the upcoming ministry and appoint additional Greens ministers. On 24 October 2020, after final votes were counted, it was announced that Attorney-General Gordon Ramsay lost his seat in Ginninderra. He remained as Attorney-General until the new ministry was sworn in.

In early November, the Greens signed a new formal Parliamentary and Governing Agreement with Labor which continued to maintain Greens leader Shane Rattenbury's position in the Ministry as well as adding a further two Greens ministers, whilst mandating that the Greens not move or support any motion of no confidence in the Labor Government, except in instances of gross misconduct or corruption.

== First arrangement ==
Following Labor's re-election at the 2020 general election, a new ministry was appointed on 4 November 2020. The cabinet was expanded from eight to nine ministers. Tara Cheyne, Rebecca Vassarotti and Emma Davidson were newly appointed to the ministry, replacing Gordon Ramsay and Suzanne Orr.

On 17 February 2021, the position of Assistant Minister for Families and Community Services was renamed Assistant Minister for Seniors, Veterans, Families and Community Services.

This arrangement lasted until 10 December 2023.

Party	Portrait	Minister	Portfolio
Labor		Andrew Barr	Chief Minister; Treasurer; Minister for Climate Action; Minister for Economic Development; Minister for Tourism
Labor		Yvette Berry	Deputy Chief Minister; Minister for Early Childhood Development; Minister for Education and Youth Affairs; Minister for Housing and Suburban Development; Minister for Women; Minister for the Prevention of Domestic and Family Violence; Minister for Sport and Recreation
Labor		Mick Gentleman	Manager of Government Business; Minister for Planning and Land Management; Minister for Police and Emergency Services; Minister for Corrections; Minister for Industrial Relations and Workplace Safety
Greens		Shane Rattenbury	Attorney-General; Minister for Consumer Affairs; Minister for Water, Energy and Emissions Reduction; Minister for Gaming
Labor		Rachel Stephen-Smith	Minister for Health; Minister for Families and Community Services; Minister for Aboriginal and Torres Strait Islander Affairs
Labor		Chris Steel	Minister for Transport and City Services; Minister for Skills; Special Minister of State
Labor		Tara Cheyne	Assistant Minister for Economic Development; Minister for the Arts; Minister for Business and Better Regulation; Minister for Human Rights; Minister for Multicultural Affairs
Greens		Rebecca Vassarotti	Minister for the Environment; Minister for Heritage; Minister for Homelessness and Housing Services; Minister for Sustainable Building and Construction
Greens		Emma Davidson	Assistant Minister for Families and Community Services (until 17 February 2021); Assistant Minister for Seniors, Veterans, Families and Community Services (from 17 February 2021); Minister for Disability; Minister for Justice Health; Minister for Mental Health

=== Party breakdown ===
- Labor
- Greens
6
3

== Second Arrangement ==
This arrangement was appointed on 11 December 2023 to better align minister for the 2024 general election.

Party	Portrait	Minister	Portfolio
Labor		Andrew Barr	Chief Minister; Treasurer; Minister for Climate Action; Minister for Trade, Investment and Economic Development; Minister for Tourism
Labor		Yvette Berry	Deputy Chief Minister; Minister for Early Childhood Development; Minister for Education and Youth Affairs; Minister for Housing and Suburban Development; Minister for Women; Minister for the Prevention of Domestic and Family Violence; Minister for Sport and Recreation
Labor		Mick Gentleman	Manager of Government Business; Minister for Business; Minister for Fire and Emergency Services; Minister for Industrial Relations and Workplace Safety; Minister for Multicultural Affairs; Minister for Police and Crime Prevention
Greens		Shane Rattenbury	Attorney-General; Minister for Consumer Affairs; Minister for Water, Energy and Emissions Reduction; Minister for Gaming
Labor		Rachel Stephen-Smith	Minister for Health; Minister for Children, Youth and Family Services; Minister for Disability; Minister for Aboriginal and Torres Strait Islander Affairs
Labor		Chris Steel	Minister for Planning; Minister for Skills and Training; Minister for Transport; Special Minister of State
Labor		Tara Cheyne	Minister for the Arts, Culture and the Creative Economy; Minister for City Services; Minister for Government Services and Regulatory Reform; Minister for Human Rights
Greens		Rebecca Vassarotti	Minister for the Environment, Parks and Land Management; Minister for Heritage; Minister for Homelessness and Housing Services; Minister for Sustainable Building and Construction
Greens		Emma Davidson	Minister for Community Services, Seniors and Veterans; Minister for Corrections and Justice Health; Minister for Mental Health; Minister for Population Health

=== Party breakdown ===
- Labor
- Greens
6
3

== See also ==
- Labor–Greens coalition

Preceded by Second Barr Ministry	Third Barr Ministry; 2020-2024	Succeeded by Fourth Barr Ministry
