= Second Barr ministry =

Second Barr Ministry
- 14th Ministry of the Australian Capital Territory
- Date formed: 1 November 2016
- Date dissolved: 3 November 2020

People and organisations
- Chief Minister: Andrew Barr
- Deputy Chief Minister: Yvette Berry
- No. of ministers: 9
- Member parties: Labor-Greens coalition
- Status in legislature: Coalition majority government 14/25
- Opposition party: Liberal
- Opposition leader: Alistair Coe

History
- Legislature term: 9th
- Predecessor: First Barr Ministry
- Successor: Third Barr Ministry

The Second Barr Ministry was the 14th ministry of the Government of the Australian Capital Territory, led by Labor Chief Minister Andrew Barr and his deputy Yvette Berry. It was appointed on 1 November 2016, following the 2016 general election held two weeks earlier. The Greens signed a new formal Parliamentary Agreement with Labor which continued to maintain Green's leader Shane Rattenbury's position in the Ministry, whilst mandating that the Greens not move or support any motion of no confidence in the Labor Government, except in instances of gross misconduct or corruption.

The previous First Barr Ministry initially contained five ministers, but was later increased to seven ministers. The number was not increased in the second ministry after the 2016 general election, even when eight more members were elected to form an expanded 25 member Legislative Assembly. The ministry was subsequently increased to eight ministers in August 2018.

The ministry was replaced by the Third Barr Ministry on 3 November 2020 after the Labor government's re-election at the 2020 election.

== First Arrangement ==
Following Labor's re-election at the 2016 general election, a new ministry was appointed on 1 November 2016. Gordon Ramsay and Rachel Stephen-Smith were new ministers appointed to the ministry, replacing Simon Corbell who retired and Chris Bourke who was defeated at the 2016 election.

Portfolio	Minister	Party affiliation
Chief Minister; Treasurer; Minister for Economic Development; Minister for Tourism and Major Events	Andrew Barr MLA	Labor
Deputy Chief Minister; Minister for Education and Early Childhood Development; Minister for Housing and Suburban Development; Minister for the Prevention of Domestic and Family Violence; Minister for Women; Minister for Sport and Recreation	Yvette Berry MLA	Labor
Minister for Health; Minister for Transport and City Services; Minister for Higher Education, Training and Research	Meegan Fitzharris MLA	Labor
Minister for Police and Emergency Services; Minister for the Environment and Heritage; Minister for Planning and Land Management; Minister for Urban Renewal	Mick Gentleman MLA	Labor
Attorney-General; Minister for Regulatory Services; Minister for the Arts and Community Events; Minister for Veterans and Seniors	Gordon Ramsay MLA	Labor
Minister for Climate Change and Sustainability; Minister for Justice and Consumer Affairs; Minister for Corrections; Minister for Mental Health	Shane Rattenbury MLA	Greens
Minister for Community Services and Social Inclusion; Minister for Disability, Children and Youth; Minister for Aboriginal and Torres Strait Islander Affairs; Minister for Multicultural Affairs; Minister for Workplace Safety and Industrial Relations	Rachel Stephen-Smith MLA	Labor

=== Subsequent changes to ministerial titles ===
There are two changes to ministerial titles between November 2016 and August 2018:

- 19 December 2016: Minister for Justice and Consumer Affairs was renamed Minister for Justice, Consumer Affairs and Road Safety (held by Shane Rattenbury)
- 1 July 2017: Minister for Health was renamed Minister for Health and Wellbeing (held by Meegan Fitzharris)

== Second Arrangement ==
On 27 August 2018, Chris Steel was appointed to the Ministry, increasing the Ministry size to 8.

Portfolio	Minister	Party affiliation
Chief Minister; Treasurer; Minister for Social Inclusion and Equality; Minister for Tourism and Special Events; Minister for Trade, Industry and Investment	Andrew Barr MLA	Labor
Deputy Chief Minister; Minister for Education and Early Childhood Development; Minister for Housing and Suburban Development; Minister for the Prevention of Domestic and Family Violence; Minister for Sport and Recreation; Minister for Women	Yvette Berry MLA	Labor
Minister for Health and Wellbeing; Minister for Higher Education; Minister for Medical and Health Research; Minister for Transport; Minister for Vocational Education and Skills	Meegan Fitzharris MLA	Labor
Minister for the Environment and Heritage; Minister for Planning and Land Management; Minister for Police and Emergency Services; Minister assisting the Chief Minister on Advanced Technology and Space Industries	Mick Gentleman MLA	Labor
Attorney-General; Minister for the Arts and Cultural Events; Minister for Building Quality Improvement; Minister for Business and Regulatory Services; Minister for Seniors and Veterans	Gordon Ramsay MLA	Labor
Minister for Climate Change and Sustainability; Minister for Corrections and Justice Health; Minister for Justice, Consumer Affairs and Road Safety; Minister for Mental Health	Shane Rattenbury MLA	Greens
Minister for Aboriginal and Torres Strait Islander Affairs; Minister for Disability; Minister for Children, Youth and Families; Minister for Employment and Workplace Safety; Minister for Government Services and Procurement; Minister for Urban Renewal	Rachel Stephen-Smith MLA	Labor
Minister for City Services; Minister for Community Services and Facilities; Minister for Multicultural Affairs; Minister for Roads	Chris Steel MLA	Labor

=== Fitzharris resignation ===
On 24 June 2019, Meegan Fitzharris announced she would resign from her cabinet roles (Transport, Health and Tertiary Education) on 1 July and politics for family reasons. In the interim until an additional new minister is appointed to the Ministry, Chris Steel took on the transport portfolio as the Transport Minister, Rachel Stephen-Smith took on the health portfolio as the Health Minister and Chief Minister Andrew Barr took on the tertiary education portfolio, all with effect from 27 June 2019. Gordon Ramsay took over as Minister for Government Services and Procurement from Stephen-Smith. There is no replacement for the Minister for Vocational Education and Skills.

The following only includes ministers whose portfolios have changed on 27 June 2019. The interim arrangement lasted till 25 August 2019.

Portfolio	Minister	Party affiliation
Chief Minister; Treasurer; Minister for Social Inclusion and Equality; Minister for Tertiary Education; Minister for Tourism and Special Events; Minister for Trade, Industry and Investment	Andrew Barr MLA	Labor
Attorney-General; Minister for the Arts and Cultural Events; Minister for Building Quality Improvement; Minister for Business and Regulatory Services; Minister for Government Services and Procurement; Minister for Seniors and Veterans	Gordon Ramsay MLA	Labor
Minister for Aboriginal and Torres Strait Islander Affairs; Minister for Disability; Minister for Children, Youth and Families; Minister for Employment and Workplace Safety; Minister for Health; Minister for Urban Renewal	Rachel Stephen-Smith MLA	Labor
Minister for Community Services and Facilities; Minister for Multicultural Affairs; Minister for Transport and City Services	Chris Steel MLA	Labor

== Third Arrangement ==
Following the interim arrangement as a result of the resignation of Meegan Fitzharris from the Ministry, a new arrangement was formed on 26 August 2019 with Suzanne Orr appointed to the Ministry.

Portfolio	Minister	Party affiliation
Chief Minister; Treasurer; Minister for Social Inclusion and Equality; Minister for Tertiary Education; Minister for Tourism and Special Events; Minister for Trade, Industry and Investment	Andrew Barr MLA	Labor
Deputy Chief Minister; Minister for Education and Early Childhood Development; Minister for Housing and Suburban Development; Minister for the Prevention of Domestic and Family Violence; Minister for Sport and Recreation; Minister for Women	Yvette Berry MLA	Labor
Minister for Advanced Technology and Space Industries; Minister for the Environment and Heritage; Minister for Planning and Land Management; Minister for Police and Emergency Services	Mick Gentleman MLA	Labor
Minister for Aboriginal and Torres Strait Islander Affairs; Minister for Children, Youth and Families; Minister for Health; Minister for Urban Renewal	Rachel Stephen-Smith MLA	Labor
Attorney-General; Minister for the Arts, Creative Industries and Cultural Events; Minister for Building Quality Improvement; Minister for Business and Regulatory Services; Minister for Seniors and Veterans	Gordon Ramsay MLA	Labor
Minister for City Services; Minister for Multicultural Affairs; Minister for Recycling and Waste Reduction; Minister for Roads and Active Travel; Minister for Transport	Chris Steel MLA	Labor
Minister for Climate Change and Sustainability; Minister for Corrections and Justice Health; Minister for Justice, Consumer Affairs and Road Safety; Minister for Mental Health	Shane Rattenbury MLA	Greens
Minister for Community Services and Facilities; Minister for Disability; Minister for Employment and Workplace Safety; Minister for Government Services and Procurement	Suzanne Orr MLA	Labor

=== March 2020 reshuffle ===
A minor reshuffle was made to the ministerial portfolios on 23 March 2020. The Tertiary Education portfolio was passed from Barr to Chris Steel and the Urban Renewal portfolio was passed from Rachel Stephen-Smith to Mick Gentleman. The arrangement lasted until the October 2020 election.

The following only includes ministers whose portfolios have changed on 23 March 2020.

Portfolio	Minister	Party affiliation
Chief Minister; Treasurer; Minister for Social Inclusion and Equality; Minister for Tourism and Special Events; Minister for Trade, Industry and Investment	Andrew Barr MLA	Labor
Minister for Advanced Technology and Space Industries; Minister for the Environment and Heritage; Minister for Planning and Land Management; Minister for Police and Emergency Services; Minister for Urban Renewal	Mick Gentleman MLA	Labor
Minister for Aboriginal and Torres Strait Islander Affairs; Minister for Children, Youth and Families; Minister for Health	Rachel Stephen-Smith MLA	Labor
Minister for City Services; Minister for Multicultural Affairs; Minister for Recycling and Waste Reduction; Minister for Roads and Active Travel; Minister for Tertiary Education; Minister for Transport	Chris Steel MLA	Labor

Preceded by First Barr Ministry	Second Barr Ministry; 2016-2020	Succeeded by Third Barr Ministry
