= Fourth Barr ministry =

2024 cabinet of the Australian Capital Territory

Fourth Barr Ministry
- 16th Ministry of the Australian Capital Territory

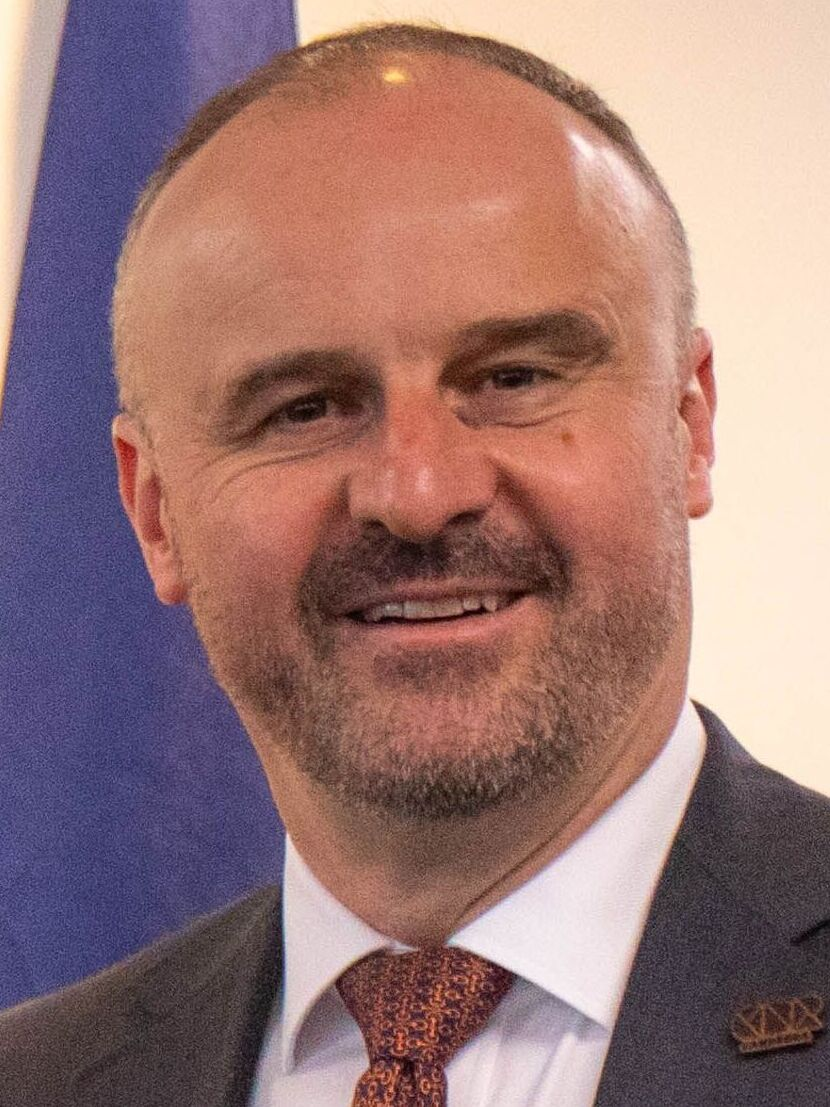
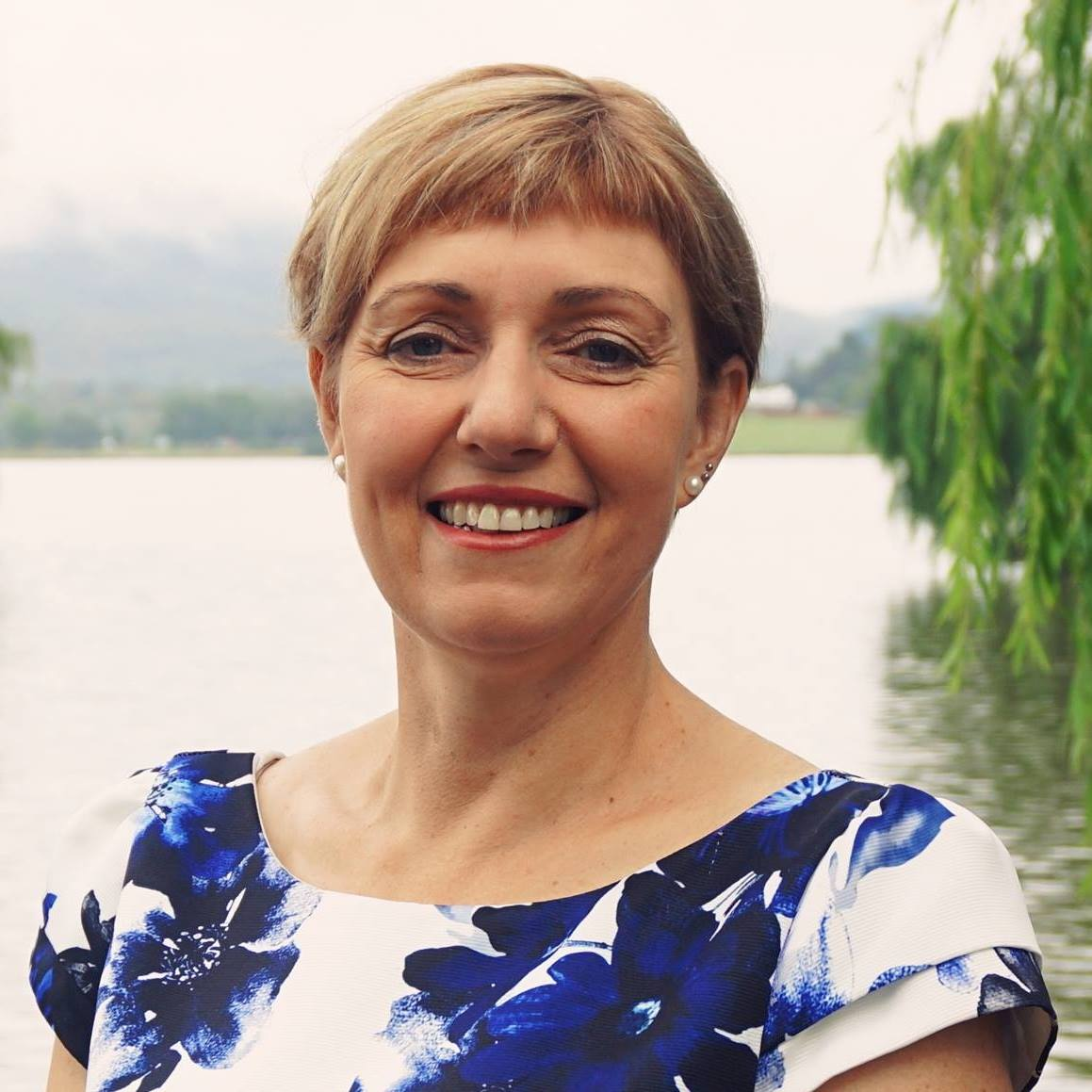
- Andrew Barr (Chief Minister) Rachel Stephen-Smith (Deputy Chief Minister)
- Date formed: 7 November 2024

People and organisations
- Chief Minister: Andrew Barr
- Deputy Chief Minister: Rachel Stephen-Smith (from 2026); Yvette Berry (until 2026)
- No. of ministers: 7
- Member parties: Labor
- Status in legislature: Labor minority government 10/25
- Opposition party: Liberal
- Opposition leader: Mark Parton (from 2025); Leanne Castley (until 2025)

History
- Legislature term: 11th
- Predecessor: Third Barr Ministry

The Fourth Barr Ministry is the 16th ministry of the Government of the Australian Capital Territory, led by Labor Chief Minister Andrew Barr and his deputy Rachel Stephen-Smith. It was appointed on 7 November 2024 to replace the Third Barr Ministry, following the 2024 general election held two weeks earlier.

Despite forming a coalition government with Labor since 2012, on 6 November 2024, Greens leader Shane Rattenbury announced that his party would return to the crossbench, effectively dissolving the coalition. However, they agreed to guarantee supply in return for Labor adopting Green's policies. This allowed Labor to continue to form government, but as a minority government.

The confidence and supply agreement expired upon Rattenbury's retirement in June 2026. Negotiations for a new agreement commenced following the election of Jo Clay as the Greens' new leader. These negotiations were unsuccessful and the Greens announced on 16 September 2026 that they would not be entering into a new confidence and supply agreement.

== Current Arrangement ==
Following Labor's re-election at the 2024 general election, a new ministry was appointed on 7 November 2024.

On 1 July 2025, the position of Minister for Housing and New Suburbs, held by Yvette Berry, was renamed Minister for Homes, Homelessness and New Suburbs and the position of Minister for the Prevention of Family and Domestic Violence, held by Marisa Paterson, was renamed Minister for the Prevention of Domestic, Family and Sexual Violence.

On 23 July 2026, Berry resigned from the ministry to sit as a backbencher following the handing down of a report from the Integrity Commission which found "serious corrupt conduct" of her former Chief of Staff and the director general of the Education Directorate.

Party	Portrait	Minister	Portfolio
Labor		Andrew Barr	Chief Minister; Minister for Economic Development; Minister for Tourism and Trade
Labor		Rachel Stephen-Smith	Minister for Health; Minister for Mental Health; Minister for Finance; Minister for the Public Service
Labor		Chris Steel	Treasurer; Minister for Planning and Sustainable Development; Minister for Heritage; Minister for Transport
Labor		Tara Cheyne	Manager of Government Business; Attorney-General; Minister for Human Rights; Minister for the Night-Time Economy; Minister for City and Government Services
Labor		Suzanne Orr	Minister for Aboriginal and Torres Strait Islander Affairs; Minister for Climate Change, Environment, Energy and Water; Minister for Disability, Carers and Community Services; Minister for Seniors and Veterans
Labor		Michael Pettersson	Minister for Business, Arts and Creative Industries; Minister for Children, Youth and Families; Minister for Multicultural Affairs; Minister for Skills, Training and Industrial Relations
Labor		Marisa Paterson	Minister for Police, Fire and Emergency Services; Minister for Women; Minister for the Prevention of Family and Domestic Violence (until 30 June 2025); Minister for the Prevention of Domestic, Family and Sexual Violence (from 1 July 2025); Minister for Corrections; Minister for Gaming Reform

== See also ==
- Australian Capital Territory Legislative Assembly

Preceded by Third Barr Ministry	Fourth Barr Ministry; 2024-present	Succeeded by Incumbent
