= First Barr ministry =

First Barr Ministry
- 13th Ministry of the Australian Capital Territory
- Date formed: 15 December 2014
- Date dissolved: 1 November 2016

People and organisations
- Chief Minister: Andrew Barr
- Deputy Chief Minister: Simon Corbell
- No. of ministers: 7
- Member parties: Labor-Greens coalition
- Status in legislature: Coalition majority government 9/17
- Opposition party: Liberal
- Opposition leader: Jeremy Hanson

History
- Legislature term: 8th
- Predecessor: Second Gallagher ministry
- Successor: Second Barr Ministry

The First Barr Ministry was the 13th ministry of the Government of the Australian Capital Territory, and was led by Labor Chief Minister Andrew Barr and his deputy Simon Corbell. It was appointed on 15 December 2014 following the resignation of Katy Gallagher as Chief Minister and the subsequent election of Andrew Barr as her replacement by the Australian Capital Territory Legislative Assembly. Green's Shane Rattenbury continued to serve as a minister for the remainder of the parliamentary term, as part of the Labor-Greens parliamentary agreement signed in 2012 at the start of the term.

The ministry was replaced by the Second Barr Ministry in November 2016 after the Labor government's re-election at the 2016 election.

== First arrangement ==
Following Barr's election as Chief Minister, a new ministry was appointed on 15 December 2014 and lasted for one month until 20 January 2015.

Portfolio	Minister	Party affiliation
Chief Minister; Treasurer; Minister for Economic Development; Minister for Housing; Minister for Tourism and Major Events	Andrew Barr MLA	Labor
Deputy Chief Minister; Attorney-General; Minister for Health; Minister for the Environment; Minister for Capital Metro	Simon Corbell MLA	Labor
Minister for Education and Training; Minister for Police and Emergency Services; Minister for Disability; Minister for Multicultural Affairs; Minister for Racing and Gaming; Minister for Women; Minister for the Arts	Joy Burch MLA	Labor
Minister for Territory and Municipal Services; Minister for Justice; Minister for Aboriginal and Torres Strait Islander Affairs; Minister for Sport and Recreation	Shane Rattenbury MLA	Greens
Minister for Planning; Minister for Workplace Safety and Industrial Relations; Minister for Community Services; Minister for Children and Young People; Minister for Ageing	Mick Gentleman MLA	Labor

== Second arrangement ==
On 20 January 2015, Yvette Berry was appointed to the Ministry, increasing the Ministry size to 6.

Portfolio	Minister	Party affiliation
Chief Minister; Treasurer; Minister for Economic Development; Minister for Urban Renewal; Minister for Tourism and Events	Andrew Barr MLA	Labor
Deputy Chief Minister; Attorney-General; Minister for Health; Minister for the Environment; Minister for Capital Metro	Simon Corbell MLA	Labor
Minister for Education and Training; Minister for Police and Emergency Services; Minister for Disability; Minister for Racing and Gaming; Minister for the Arts	Joy Burch MLA	Labor
Minister for Territory and Municipal Services; Minister for Justice; Minister for Sport and Recreation; Minister assisting the Chief Minister on Transport Reform	Shane Rattenbury MLA	Greens
Minister for Planning; Minister for Roads and Parking; Minister for Workplace Safety and Industrial Relations; Minister for Children and Young People; Minister for Ageing	Mick Gentleman MLA	Labor
Minister for Housing; Minister for Aboriginal and Torres Strait Islander Affairs; Minister for Community Services; Minister for Multicultural Affairs; Minister for Women; Minister assisting the Chief Minister on Social Inclusion and Equality	Yvette Berry MLA	Labor

=== Joy Burch controversy ===
In December 2015, Joy Burch was forced to resign as Minister for Police and Emergency Services, in the wake of allegations that her chief of staff briefed the Construction, Forestry, Maritime, Mining and Energy Union (CFMEU) on matters regarding ACT Policing which are still under investigation. Deputy Chief Minister Simon Corbell replaced Burch as the Minister for Police and Emergency Services.

== Third arrangement ==
Following Joy Burch's resignation as police minister, she resigned from all other ministerial positions a month later in January 2016. A new arrangement was formed, took effect on 22 January 2016 and lasted until the 2016 election in October, with the exception of two ministerial roles. In this arrangement, Meegan Fitzharris and former minister Chris Bourke were appointed to the Ministry, increasing the Ministry size to 7.

Portfolio	Minister	Party affiliation
Chief Minister; Treasurer; Minister for Economic Development; Minister for Tourism and Major Events; Minister for Urban Renewal	Andrew Barr MLA	Labor
Deputy Chief Minister; Attorney-General; Minister for Capital Metro; Minister for Health; Minister for Police and Emergency Services; Minister for the Environment and Climate Change	Simon Corbell MLA	Labor
Minister for Planning and Land Management; Minister for Racing and Gaming; Minister for Workplace Safety and Industrial Relations	Mick Gentleman MLA	Labor
Minister for Corrections; Minister for Education; Minister for Justice and Consumer Affairs; Minister for Road Safety	Shane Rattenbury MLA	Greens
Minister for Housing, Community Services and Social Inclusion; Minister for Multicultural and Youth Affairs; Minister for Sport and Recreation; Minister for Women	Yvette Berry MLA	Labor
Minister for Higher Education, Training and Research; Minister for Transport and Municipal Services; Assistant Minister for Health	Meegan Fitzharris MLA	Labor
Minister for Aboriginal and Torres Strait Islander Affairs; Minister for Children and Young People; Minister for Disability; Minister for Small Business and the Arts; Minister for Veterans and Seniors	Chris Bourke MLA	Labor

=== Establishment of Transport Canberra and City Services Directorate ===
On 1 July 2016, with the establishment of Transport Canberra and City Services Directorate (TCCS) as a new directorate, the ministerial positions for Transport and Municipal Services (held by Meegan Fitzharris) and Capital Metro (held by Simon Corbell) were abolished and replaced by Minister for Transport Canberra and City Services (held by Meegan Fitzharris). The arrangement lasted until 31 October 2016 when it was replaced by the Second Barr Ministry following the 2016 election. No other changes to ministerial appointments were made.

The following only includes ministers whose portfolios have changed on 1 July 2016.

Portfolio	Minister	Party affiliation
Deputy Chief Minister; Attorney-General; Minister for Health; Minister for Police and Emergency Services; Minister for the Environment and Climate Change	Simon Corbell MLA	Labor
Minister for Higher Education, Training and Research; Minister for Transport Canberra and City Services; Assistant Minister for Health	Meegan Fitzharris MLA	Labor

Preceded by Second Gallagher Ministry	First Barr Ministry; 2014-2016	Succeeded by Second Barr Ministry
