= 2020 Australian Capital Territory election =

- 17 October 2020

All 25 seats of the Australian Capital Territory Legislative Assembly 13 seats needed for a majority
- Opinion polls
- Turnout: 89.3% (▲1.0 pp)
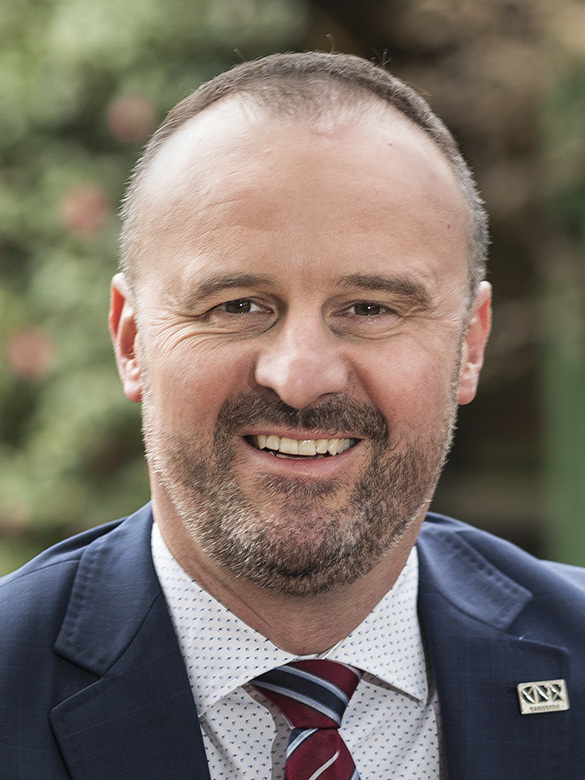

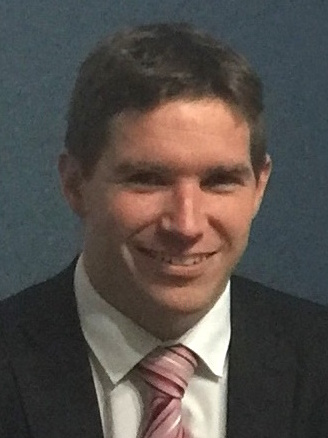

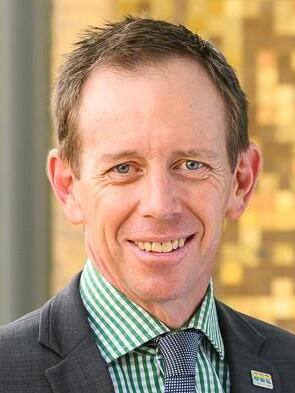
	First party	Second party	Third party
Leader	Andrew Barr	Alistair Coe	Shane Rattenbury
Party	Labor	Liberal	Greens
Leader since	11 December 2014	25 October 2016	20 October 2012
Leader's seat	Kurrajong	Yerrabi	Kurrajong
Last election	12 seats, 38.4%	11 seats, 36.7%	2 seats, 10.3%
Seats won	10	9	6
Seat change	▼2	▼2	▲4
Primary vote	101,826	91,047	36,369
Percentage	37.8%	33.8%	13.5%
Swing	▼0.6	▼2.9	▲3.2
- Results by electorate
Chief Minister before election
Andrew Barr
Labor–Greens Coalition
Elected Chief Minister
Andrew Barr
Labor–Greens Coalition

The 2020 Australian Capital Territory election was held on 17 October 2020 to elect all 25 members of the unicameral ACT Legislative Assembly.

The incumbent Labor-Greens coalition government, led by Chief Minister Andrew Barr, defeated the opposition Liberal Party. On the night of the election Barr claimed victory and confirmed Labor would again seek to enter into an arrangement with the Greens to form government, whilst Liberal leader Alistair Coe conceded the election and acknowledged the party would retain opposition status in the Assembly. The result meant that the Labor Party, which had been in office for 19 years at this election, won a sixth consecutive term of government in the Territory. Despite the victory, Labor's representation in the Assembly dropped to ten seats, whilst the Liberals also suffered a decline in their vote and fell to nine seats. The Greens retained the balance of power and picked up the seats lost by the two larger parties to claim six seats, its largest representation in the Assembly in the party's history. Following the election, Labor and the Greens signed an agreement on 2 November to support a Labor-led Government with three ministers from the Greens.

The election was conducted by the ACT Electoral Commission, using the proportional Hare-Clark system. At the preliminary close of rolls, there were 302,630 people enrolled to vote, representing a 6% increase on the 2016 election. Legislative changes in the Australian Capital Territory allowed for people to enrol during polling, with a further 3,370 electors enrolling before polling finished on 17 October.

== Background ==
The incumbent Labor Party led by Chief Minister Andrew Barr was attempting to win re-election for a sixth term in the 25-member unicameral ACT Legislative Assembly. Labor formed a minority coalition government with the Greens after the 2016 election, with the Greens holding the balance of power; Labor 12 seats, Liberal 11 seats, Greens 2 seats. Greens member Shane Rattenbury remained in the cabinet for a second term. Leader of the Opposition and Liberals leader Jeremy Hanson was replaced by Alistair Coe following the election.

All members of the unicameral Assembly faced re-election, with members being elected by the Hare-Clark system of proportional representation. The Assembly was divided into five electorates with five members each:

- Brindabella – contains the district of Tuggeranong (except part of the suburb of Kambah east of Drakeford Drive), as well as the southern village of Tharwa and farms.
- Ginninderra – contains the district of Belconnen (except the suburbs of Giralang and Kaleen).
- Kurrajong – contains the districts of Canberra Central (excluding Deakin and Yarralumla), Jerrabomberra, Kowen and Majura.
- Murrumbidgee – contains the districts of the Woden Valley, Weston Creek, Molonglo Valley, the South Canberra suburbs of Deakin and Yarralumla and the western part of the Tuggeranong suburb of Kambah.
- Yerrabi – contains the districts of Gungahlin, Hall and the Belconnen suburbs of Giralang and Kaleen.

== Key dates ==
- Last day to lodge applications for party register: 30 June 2020
- Party registration closed: 10 September 2020
- Pre-election period commenced and nominations opened: 11 September 2020
- Rolls close: 18 September 2020 (8pm)
- Nominations close: 23 September 2020 (12pm)
- Nominations declared and ballot paper order determined: 24 September 2020
- Pre-poll voting commences: 28 September 2020
- Polling day: 17 October 2020
- Last day for receipt of postal votes: 23 October 2020

== Redistribution ==
A redistribution of electoral boundaries for the ACT took place in 2019 for the 2020 election. The redistribution committee was appointed on 26 October 2018, and its final report was tabled on 13 August 2019.

Changes were as follows:

- Brindabella: gained Kambah West from Murrumbidgee.
- Ginninderra: gained Belconnen District 2, Evatt, Lawson and McKellar from Yerrabi.
- Kurrajong: lost Deakin and Yarralumla to Murrumbidgee.
- Murrumbidgee: gained Deakin and Yarralumla from Kurrajong; lost Kambah West to Brindabella.
- Yerrabi: lost Belconnen District 2, Evatt, Lawson and McKellar to Ginninderra.

== Retiring members ==
=== Liberal ===
- Vicki Dunne (Ginninderra)

=== Greens ===
- Caroline Le Couteur (Murrumbidgee)

== Candidates ==
137 candidates were formally declared for 2020 ACT Election on 24 September, with the total number of candidates down four from 2016's total. Of the 137 candidates, 129 were registered to political parties and eight were independents.

As part of the formal declaration, the candidates' names and any political party affiliation were announced, followed by a 'double randomisation' draw for each electorate to determine the order in which each party will appear on the ballot paper. A further draw then took place determining the starting order for the Robson rotations in each column. Under the Robson rotation system, 60 different versions of the ballot papers were printed for each electorate.

Sitting members are in bold. Successful candidates are identified with an asterisk.

=== Brindabella ===
Five seats were up for election. The Labor Party was defending two seats. The Liberal Party was defending three seats.

Labor candidates	Liberal candidates	Greens candidates	AJP candidates	LDP candidates
**Joy Burch***; Cathy Day; Brendan Forde; **Mick Gentleman***; Taimus Werner-Gibbings	James Daniels; Jane Hiatt; **Nicole Lawder***; **Mark Parton***; **Andrew Wall**	Johnathan Davis*; Sue Ellerman; Laura Nuttall	Jannah Fahiz; Robyn Soxsmith	Jacob Gowor; Matthew Knight
Sustainable candidates	SFF candidates	Federation candidates		
Andrew Clapham; Bruce Willett	Greg Baynham; Adrian Olley	Jason Potter; Scott Sandford		

=== Ginninderra ===
Five seats were up for election. The Labor Party was defending three seats. The Liberal Party was defending two seats.

Labor candidates	Liberal candidates	Greens candidates	Belco Party candidates	AJP candidates	LDP candidates
**Yvette Berry***; **Tara Cheyne***; Sue Ducker; Greg Lloyd; **Gordon Ramsay**	Peter Cain*; Robert Gunning; **Elizabeth Kikkert***; Kacey Lam; Ignatius Rozario	Jo Clay*; Tim Liersch; Katt Millner	Vijay Dubey; Chic Henry; Angela Lount; Bill Stefaniak; Alan Tutt	Carolyne Drew; Lara Drew	Dominic De Luca; Guy Jakeman
Sustainable candidates	SFF candidates	DLP candidates	CCJ candidates	Ungrouped candidates	
Paul Gabriel; Mark O'Connor	Matthew Ogilvie; Oliver Smith	Helen McClure; Ian McClure	Oksana Demetrios; Sok Kheng Ngep; Jonathan Stavridis	Mignonne Cullen (Ind)	

=== Kurrajong ===
Five seats were up for election. The Labor Party was defending two seats. The Liberal Party was defending two seats. The Greens were defending one seat.

Labor candidates	Liberal candidates	Greens candidates	Progressives candidates	AJP candidates
Judy Anderson; **Andrew Barr***; Jacob Ingram; Maddy Northam; **Rachel Stephen-Smith***	**Candice Burch**; Rattesh Gumber; Robert Johnson; **Elizabeth Lee***; Patrick Pentony	Adriana Boisen; Michael Brewer; **Shane Rattenbury***; Rebecca Vassarotti*	Tim Bohm; Peta Anne Bryant; Therese Faulkner	Serrin Rutledge-Prior; Julie Smith
Sustainable candidates	CCJ candidates	Community candidates	Ungrouped candidates	
Joy Angel; John Haydon	Sophia Forner; Petar Johnson; Alix O'Hara	Alvin Hopper; Robyn Williams	Marilena Damiano (Ind); Bruce Paine (Ind)	

=== Murrumbidgee ===
Five seats were up for election. The Labor Party was defending two seats. The Liberal Party was defending two seats. The Greens were defending one seat.

Labor candidates	Liberal candidates	Greens candidates	Progressives candidates	CCJ candidates
**Bec Cody**; Tim Dobson; Brendan Long; Marisa Paterson*; **Chris Steel***	Ed Cocks; **Jeremy Hanson***; **Giulia Jones***; Amardeep Singh; Sarah Suine	Terry Baker; Emma Davidson*; Tjanara Goreng Goreng	Robert Knight; Stephen Lin	Rohan Byrnes; Andrew Demetrios; Richard Forner; Jackson Hillman; Peter Veenstra
AJP candidates	Sustainable candidates	SFF candidates	Ungrouped candidates	
Yana del Valle; Edmund Handby	Geoff Buckmaster; Jill Mail	Mark Gilmayer; Gordon Yeatman	Fiona Carrick (Ind); Lee Perren-Leveridge (Ind); Brendan Whyte (Ind)	

=== Yerrabi ===
Five seats were up for election. The Labor Party was defending three seats. The Liberal Party was defending two seats.

Labor candidates	Liberal candidates	Greens candidates	Progressives candidates	AJP candidates
Tom Fischer; **Deepak-Raj Gupta**; **Suzanne Orr***; **Michael Pettersson***; Georgia Phillips	Leanne Castley*; **Alistair Coe***; **James Milligan**; Krishna Nadimpalli; Jacob Vadakkedathu	Andrew Braddock*; Mainul Haque	Mike Stelzig; Bethany Williams	Bernie Brennan; Francine Horne
Sustainable candidates	DLP candidates	Pollard candidates	Ungrouped candidates	
John Kearsley; Scott Young	Olivia Helmore; Bernie Strang	David Pollard; Stephanie Pollard	Mohammad Munir Hussain (AFP); Helen Cross (Ind); Fuxin Li (Ind)	

== Campaign ==
=== Controversies ===
Liberal candidate for Kurrajong, Robert Johnson, was alleged to have been the director of the ACT branch of the Association for the Promotion of Peaceful Reunification of China, an organisation belonging to the China Council for the Promotion of Peaceful National Reunification, which is an umbrella organisation connected to the Chinese Communist Party, according to a 9 October 2020 article from the Canberra Times, which claims that his appointment to the position was reported on the parent organisation's official website. An earlier Canberra Times article from 2 October 2020 also reported that Robert Johnson had featured in a China Central Television documentary which claimed that he served in the Australian Army in Afghanistan. In 2014, he was a standing committee member of the Jiangsu Overseas Exchange Association, within the Overseas Chinese Affairs Office of the Jiangsu Provincial Government. ACT Liberals leader Alistair Coe denies allegations that Robert Johnson, who is also known as Jiang Jialiang (江嘉梁), has ties to the Chinese Communist Party.

== Results ==
Party	Votes	%	+/–	Seats	+/–
Labor	101,826	37.82	▼0.61	10	▼2
Liberal	91,047	33.81	▼2.91	9	▼2
Greens	36,369	13.51	▲3.23	6	▲4
Ungrouped Independents	6,625	2.46	▼1.98	0	0
Progressives	5,443	2.02	▲2.02	0	0
Belco	5,264	1.96	New	0	New
Animal Justice	4,762	1.77	▲0.26	0	0
Sustainable Australia	4,593	1.71	▲0.14	0	0
Democratic Labour	3,864	1.44	▼0.62	0	0
Shooters, Fishers and Farmers	3,779	1.40	▲1.40	0	0
Climate Change Justice Party	1,849	0.69	▲0.69	0	0
David Pollard Independent	1,729	0.64	New	0	New
Liberal Democrats	1,209	0.45	▼1.61	0	0
Australian Federation	710	0.26	▲0.26	0	0
Community Action	183	0.07	▼0.10	0	0
Total	269,252	100.00	–	25	–
Valid votes	269,252	98.58			
Invalid/blank votes	3,892	1.42			
Total votes	273,144	100.00			
Registered voters/turnout	306,000	89.26			

Seats changing hands
New MLA		Electorate	Predecessor		Ref.
Green	Johnathan Davis	Brindabella	Liberal	Andrew Wall	
Green	Jo Clay	Ginninderra	Labor	Gordon Ramsay	
Liberal	Peter Cain	Ginninderra	Liberal	Vicki Dunne (retired)	
Green	Rebecca Vassarotti	Kurrajong	Liberal	Candice Burch	
Labor	Marisa Paterson	Murrumbidgee	Labor	Bec Cody	
Green	Emma Davidson	Murrumbidgee	Green	Caroline Le Couteur (retired)	
Green	Andrew Braddock	Yerrabi	Labor	Deepak-Raj Gupta	
Liberal	Leanne Castley	Yerrabi	Liberal	James Milligan	

=== Primary vote by electorate ===
	Brindabella	Ginninderra	Kurrajong	Murrumbidgee	Yerrabi
ACT Labor	40.7%	40.0%	38.0%	36.1%	34.2%
Canberra Liberals	38.4%	26.7%	27.6%	35.6%	40.6%
ACT Greens	10.8%	12.5%	23.0%	11.7%	10.2%
Progressives	0.0%	0.0%	5.0%	2.7%	2.7%
Animal Justice	2.2%	1.7%	1.6%	2.0%	1.3%
Other	7.8%	19.1%	4.8%	11.9%	11.1%

=== Distribution of seats ===
Electorate	Seats held
Brindabella	
Ginninderra	
Kurrajong	
Murrumbidgee	
Yerrabi	

Labor
Liberal
Green

Labor won 43% of the three-party vote, the Liberals won 39% and the Greens won 18%.

== Opinion polling ==
=== Voting intention ===
Date	Firm	Sample size	Political parties			
Date	Firm	Sample size	ALP	LIB	GRN	OTH
17 Oct 2020	2020 election		37.8%	33.8%	13.5%	14.9%
29 Sep 2020	ClubsACT	1,320	36.1%	38.6%	9.6%	15.7%
9 Aug 2020	uComms	1,049	37.6%	38.2%	14.6%	9.3%
15 Oct 2016	2016 election		38.4%	36.7%	10.3%	14.6%

== See also ==
- Labor–Greens coalition
- Members of the Australian Capital Territory Legislative Assembly, 2016–2020
