= National Health Co-op =

Australian healthcare co-operative

National Health Cooperative Limited

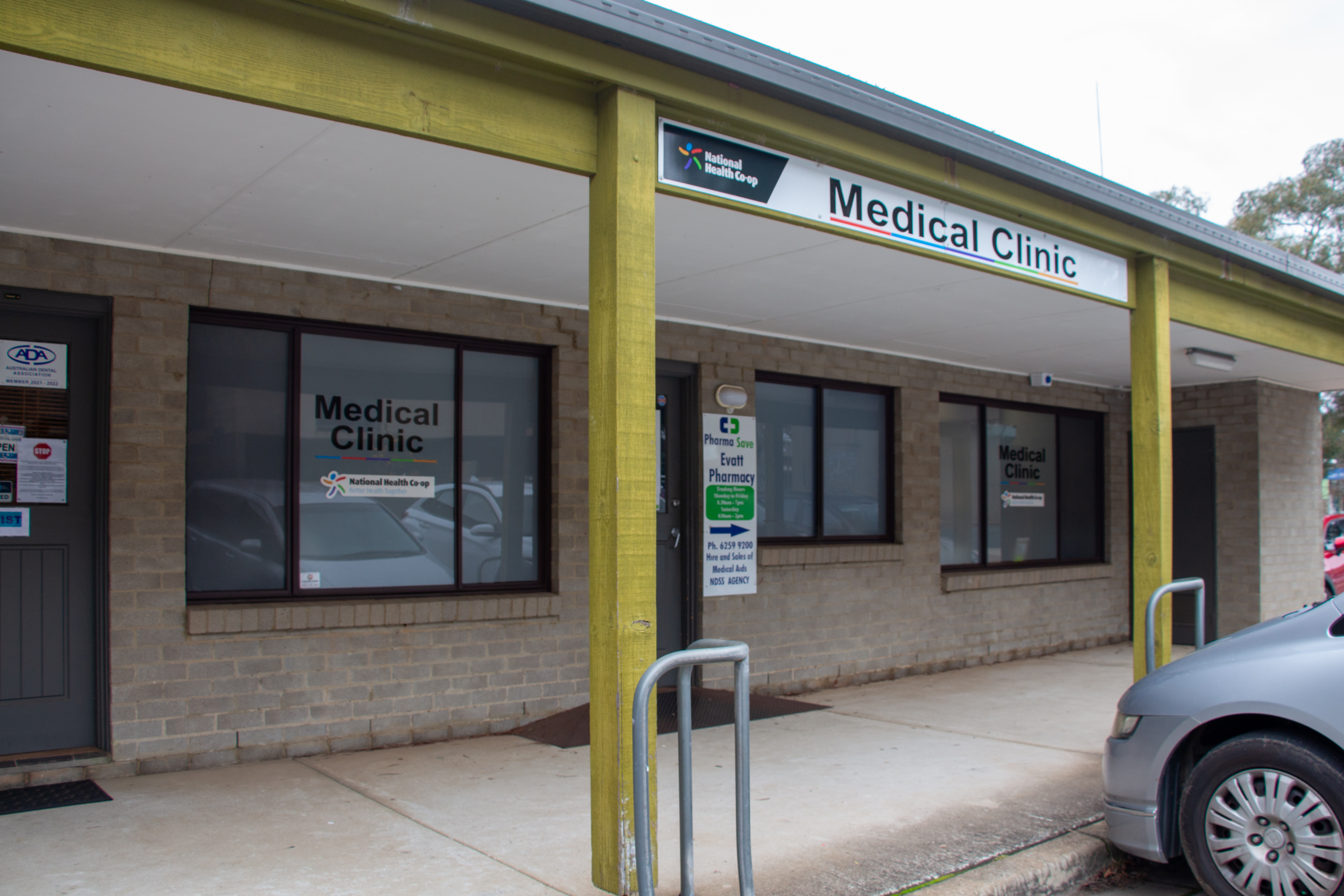
- The NHC branch in Evatt
- Type: Cooperative
- Industry: Healthcare
- Founded: December 1, 2006; 19 years ago in Canberra, Australia
- Defunct: October 2021
- Headquarters: Canberra, Australia
- Number of locations: 7 (2021)
- Areas served: Australian Capital Territory, Queanbeyan, Yass
- Key people: Linda Addison (Chairperson); Alison Wright (CEO); Dr Belinda Doherty (Medical Director)
- Revenue: ▲ A$14,891,179 (2020)
- Operating income: ▼ A$−64,978 (2020)
- Net income: ▼ A$−64,978 (2020)
- Total assets: ▲ A$19,466,703 (2020)
- Total equity: ▼ A$536,522 (2020)
- Members: 32,000 (2020)
- Number of employees: 87 (2020)
- Website: nhc.coop at the Wayback Machine (archived 2021-07-12)

The National Health Co-op (NHC) was a Canberra, Australia based healthcare provider founded in 2006. Structured as a cooperative, the organisation offered bulk-billed medical services to its members and Australian National University students. Founded in recognition of the fact that the Australian Capital Territory has the lowest rate of bulk-billing in the country, as of 2021 the NHC constituted 14% of bulk-billed appointments in the region.

On 22 June 2021, NHC went into voluntary administration and began a process of restructuring, announcing the closure or transfer of all clinics 22 September 2021. By 2 October 2021, every clinic except the one located on the ANU campus had transferred to new operators, with ANU taking over operations on 25 October.

== History ==
Initially founded in 2006 to fill a gap of bulk-billed healthcare in the West Belconnen area, the organization expanded over the next 13 years to a peak of 11 locations around the Australian Capital Territory and Yass. in 2019, the organization had over 44,000 members and provided over 190,000 appointments annually; (Note: NHC Annual Report 2018-19 - https://www.nhc.coop/wp-content/uploads/2020/12/NHC-Annual-Report-18-19.pdf (Archived)) in 2020, this had fallen to 32,000 members and provided 186,000 appointments annually. NHC was praised by the Barr Ministry, and in 2021 they announced a territory government operated walk-in centre co-located in the Coombs branch. In 2019, the Waniassa Clinic was closed; In 2020, the Yass and Charnwood Clinics closed, leaving 8 remaining clinics.

In 2017, NHC was awarded a 40-year contract to operate the Australian National University medical clinic as the university sought to privatize its previously in-house services. Under the agreement, students at the university receive free membership and bulk-billed treatment. Despite NHC offering psychology services, the university continues to operate an independent counselling clinic.

On 9 September 2021, the ANU Education Activism Network, a student advocacy group, was made aware that the ANU was undertaking plans to bring the on campus clinic under university operation. By late September, ANU was still in negotiation with NHC regarding the fate of the clinic, only taking over operations in October. As of late 2023, the ANU was looking for a new provider to run their clinic.

== Collapse ==
On 22 June 2021 NHC went into voluntary administration, after the cessation of the JobKeeper welfare program resulted in an "insurmountable" forecast deficit for the 2021/22 financial year. The firm "Slaven Torline" was appointed as the administrators, and stated that the "health service can continue trading for at least three months, given the cash flow". The collapse sparked a debate over the sustainability of the current bulk-billing scheme and rates, as well as a wider discussion on the role of government provided healthcare. Roger Nicoll, a founding member of the preceding organisation, also raised questions about the lack of consultation with the members of the cooperative prior to the announcement.

On 10 August 2020, the administrators announced that an agreement regarding the fate of the provider was expected by the end of September. On 22 September 2021, it was announced that 5 clinics, Coombs, Evatt, Higgins, Kippax, and Macquarie would be sold to new, independent operators by 2 October 2021. The ANU clinic would be brought back under university operation, once the organisation was able to do so. No announcement was made regarding the sole remaining clinic in Chisholm.
