= List of LGBTQ holders of political offices in Australia =

This is a list of LGBTI (lesbian, gay, bisexual, transgender and intersex) holders of political offices in Australia. Currently and historically there are no known intersex parliamentarians, although Tony Briffa is known as the world's first openly intersex mayor and "first known intersex public office-bearer in the Western world", having served as Deputy Mayor of the City of Hobsons Bay between 2009–2011 and Mayor between 2011–2012.

== Federal parliament ==
Name	Image	Party	Seat	Term in Office		Notes
Don Dobie		Liberal	Member for Hughes	26 November 1966	25 October 1969	Gay. Had a long-term relationship with George Burniston. Was subject to homophobic remarks in Parliament.
Don Dobie		Liberal	Member for Cook	25 October 1969	2 December 1972	Gay. Had a long-term relationship with George Burniston. Was subject to homophobic remarks in Parliament.
Don Dobie		Liberal	Member for Cook	13 December 1975	29 January 1996	Gay. Had a long-term relationship with George Burniston. Was subject to homophobic remarks in Parliament.
Neil Brown		Liberal	Member for Diamond Valley	25 October 1969	2 December 1972	Came out in 1996 as homosexual, accepted bisexual as a personal descriptor
Neil Brown		Liberal	Member for Diamond Valley	13 December 1975	5 March 1983	Came out in 1996 as homosexual, accepted bisexual as a personal descriptor
Neil Brown		Liberal	Member for Menzies	1 December 1984	25 February 1991	Came out in 1996 as homosexual, accepted bisexual as a personal descriptor
Neal Blewett		Labor	Member for Bonython	10 December 1977	11 February 1994	Came out in 2000
Colin Hollis		Labor	Member for Macarthur	5 March 1983	1 December 1984	
Colin Hollis		Labor	Member for Throsby	1 December 1984	8 October 2001	
Bob Brown		Greens	Senator for Tasmania	1 July 1996	15 June 2012	
Brian Greig		Democrats	Senator for Western Australia	1 July 1999	30 June 2005	
Penny Wong		Labor	Senator for South Australia	1 July 2002	incumbent	
Louise Pratt		Labor	Senator for Western Australia	1 July 2008	30 June 2014	
Louise Pratt		Labor	Senator for Western Australia	2 July 2016	30 June 2025	
Dean Smith		Liberal	Senator for Western Australia	2 May 2012	incumbent	
Janet Rice		Greens	Senator for Victoria	1 July 2014	19 April 2024	
Robert Simms		Greens	Senator for South Australia	22 September 2015	2 July 2016	
Trent Zimmerman		Liberal	Member for North Sydney	5 December 2015	23 May 2022	
Trevor Evans		Liberal	Member for Brisbane	2 July 2016	23 May 2022	
Julian Hill		Labor	Member for Bruce	2 July 2016	incumbent	
Tim Wilson		Liberal	Member for Goldstein	2 July 2016	23 May 2022	
Tim Wilson		Liberal	Member for Goldstein	3 May 2025	incumbent	
Kerryn Phelps		Independent	Member for Wentworth	20 October 2018	18 May 2019	
Angie Bell		Liberal	Member for Moncrieff	18 May 2019	incumbent	
Nita Green		Labor	Senator for Queensland	1 July 2019	incumbent	
Stephen Bates		Greens	Member for Brisbane	28 May 2022	3 May 2025	
Emma Comer		Labor	Member for Petrie	3 May 2025	incumbent	
Josh Dolega		Labor	Senator for Tasmania	3 May 2025	incumbent	

== Tasmania ==
- Former:
  - Bob Brown (Independent Green) – 1983–1993
  - Alison Standen (Labor) – 2018–2021
- Historic firsts:
  - Party leader: Bob Brown (Greens) – 1989–1993

== New South Wales ==
=== Legislative Council ===
- Current:
  - Penny Sharpe (Labor) – 2005
  - Chris Rath (Liberal) – 2022
  - Amanda Cohn (Greens) – 2023
  - Jacqui Munro (Liberal) – 2023
- Former:
  - Michael Yabsley (Liberal) – 1984–1994 [Came out: 2020]
  - Paul O'Grady (Labor) – 1988–1996 [Came out: 1990]
  - Michael Egan (Labor) – 1986–2005 [Came out: 1995]
  - Helen Westwood (Labor) – 2007–2015
  - Don Harwin (Liberal) – 2011–2022 [Came out: 2014]
  - Shayne Mallard (Liberal) – 2015–2023
  - Mark Pearson (Animal Justice) – 2015–2023

=== Legislative Assembly ===
- Current:
  - Alex Greenwich (Independent) – 2012
- Former:
  - Michael Egan (Labor) – 1978–1984
  - Tony Doyle (Labor) – 1985–1994 [Came out: 1994]
  - Bruce Notley-Smith (Liberal) – 2011–2019

== Western Australia ==
=== Legislative Council ===
- Current:
  - Stephen Dawson (Labor) – 2013
- Former:
  - Giz Watson (Greens) – 1997–2013
  - Lynn MacLaren (Greens) – 2005, 2009–2017
  - Louise Pratt (Labor) – 2001–2007
  - Peter Foster (Labor) – 2021–2025

=== Legislative Assembly ===
- Current
  - Stuart Aubrey (Labor) – 2021
  - John Carey (Labor) – 2017
- Former:
  - Lisa Baker (Labor) – 2008–2025
  - John Hyde (Labor) – 2001–2013

== Victoria ==
=== Legislative Council ===
- Current:
  - Harriet Shing (Labor) – 2014
  - Joe McCracken (Liberal) – 2022
  - Aiv Puglielli (Greens) – 2022
- Former:
  - Andrew Olexander (Liberal) – 1999–2006

=== Legislative Assembly ===
- Current:
  - Steve Dimopoulos (Labor) – 2014
  - Gabrielle de Vietri (Greens) – 2022

== South Australia ==
=== House of Assembly ===
- Current:
  - David Wilkins (Labor) – 2026
  - Jason Virgo (One Nation) – 2026

=== Legislative Council ===
- Current:
  - Ian Hunter (Labor) – 2006
  - Robert Simms (Greens) – 2021
- Former:
  - Don Dunstan (Labor) – 1953–1979
  - Kelly Vincent (Dignity) – 2010–2018
- Historic Firsts:
  - Premier: Don Dunstan (Labor) – 1967

== Australian Capital Territory ==
- Current:
  - Andrew Barr (Labor) – 2006
  - Chris Steel (Labor) – 2016
  - Suzanne Orr (Labor) – 2016
  - Laura Nuttall (Greens) – 2023
- Former:
  - Jonathan Davis (Greens) – 2020–2023 (resigned)
- Historic firsts:
  - Government minister: Andrew Barr (Labor) – 2006
  - Chief Minister: Andrew Barr (Labor) – 2014

== Northern Territory ==
Current:

- Chansey Paech (Labor) – 2016

Officeholders:

- Leader of the Opposition: Jodeen Carney (Liberal) – (2005)
- Speaker of the Assembly: Chansey Paech (Labor) – (2020)

== See also ==
- List of transgender politicians in Australia
- List of the first LGBT holders of political offices
