= Suzanne Orr =

Australian politician (born 1982)

Suzanne Orr MLA
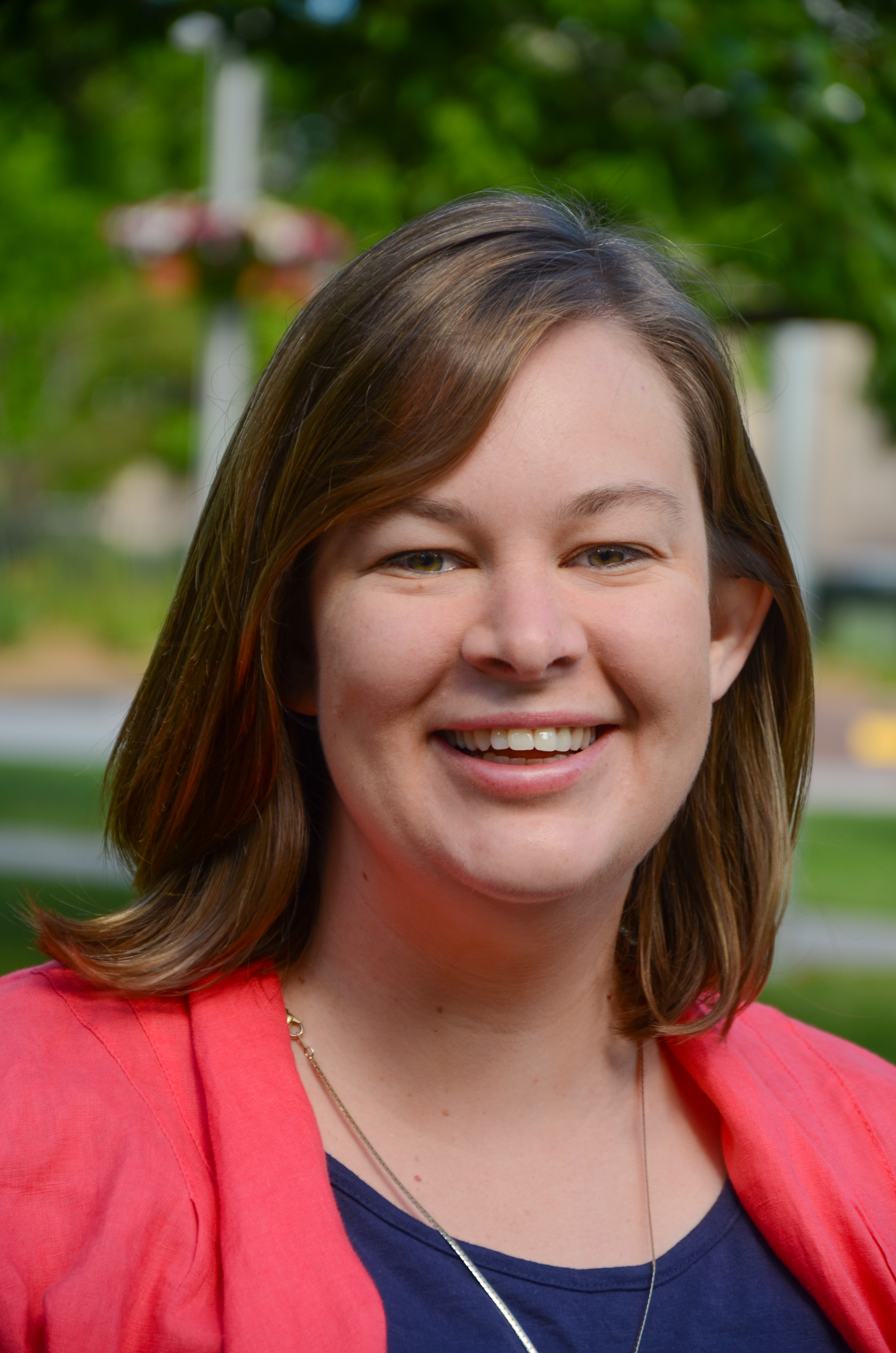

Member of the Australian Capital Territory Legislative Assembly for Yerrabi
- Incumbent
- Assumed office 15 October 2016

Former Minister for Community Services and Facilities
- In office 26 August 2019 – 4 November 2020
- Leader: Andrew Barr
- Preceded by: Chris Steel
- Succeeded by: Emma Davidson

Former Minister for Disability
- In office 26 August 2019 – 4 November 2020
- Leader: Andrew Barr
- Preceded by: Rachel Stephen-Smith
- Succeeded by: Emma Davidson

Former Minister for Employment and Workplace Safety
- In office 26 August 2019 – 4 November 2020
- Leader: Andrew Barr
- Preceded by: Rachel Stephen-Smith

Former Minister for Government Services and Procurement
- In office 26 August 2019 – 4 November 2020
- Leader: Andrew Barr
- Preceded by: Gordon Ramsay

Personal details
- Born: 6 February 1982 (age 44) Canberra, Australia
- Party: Labor Party
- Relations: Nathanael Orr (Paternal Grandfather)
- Education: University of Canberra Australian National University
- Profession: Urban Planner
- Website: www.suzanneorr.com.au

Suzanne Patricia Orr (born 6 February 1982) is an Australian politician. She has served as member of the Australian Capital Territory Legislative Assembly since 2016 for the Labor Party, representing the electorate of Yerrabi. Prior to her election, she worked variously in urban planning and the hospitality sector.

== Early life ==
Orr was born in Canberra and grew up in the suburb of Giralang. While growing up her family fostered more than 200 children. She says that the support her family received from social services while they fostered the children "showed me that government has a big role to play in helping when people need extra support". After completing her master's degree, Orr left the hospitality sector and began a career as an urban planner in the Australian Public Service. In 2015, Orr moved to the suburb of Franklin.

== Political career ==
Orr joined the Australian Labor Party in 2013. She organised a successful campaign within the ACT ALP branch along with 350.org to encourage the ACT Government to divest from fossil fuel companies soon after being involved in the party.

In the 2016 ACT election, Orr was elected to the ACT Legislative Assembly as the ACT Labor Member for Yerrabi. On 26 August 2019, she was appointed as the Minister for Community Services and Facilities, Minister for Disability, Minister for Employment and Workplace Safety and Minister for Government Services and Procurement in the Second Barr Ministry after a reshuffle.

In the 2020 ACT Election, Orr was re-elected to the ACT Legislative Assembly as the ACT Labor Member for Yerrabi. Orr moved onto the backbench after a change in numbers in the 2020 ACT Election and the reshuffle that formed the Third Barr Ministry on 4 November 2020. Orr is currently the Government Whip and deputy chair of both the Economy and Gender and Economic Equality Committee and the Planning, Transport and City Services Committee.

=== Carers Recognition Act ===
In December 2021, Orr passed the Carers Recognition Act 2021, an Act to formally recognise the role of unpaid carers in the ACT. The act put in place measures requiring entities and organisations to consider and adapt business practices to support carers in the ACT. Up until this point, the ACT was the only jurisdiction in Australia to not have a law recognising carers' contribution to the society.

=== Period Poverty ===
In June 2023, Orr passed the Period Products and Facilities (Access) Act which requires the ACT Government to provide period products free of charge at designated locations across the ACT. The act aims to ensure that period products are freely available at places like schools, libraries and other suitable locations across Canberra. The act also requires the ACT Government to ensure information on menstrual hygiene is publicly available. This legislation was the first of its kind in Australia.

=== Environment ===
Orr has a passion for looking after the environment and has advocated for a number of environmentally friendly initiatives for the ACT including; planting more trees around the Yerrabi electorate, trialling reusable coffee cup zones around Canberra, planting trees throughout Mabo Boulevard in Bonner, and organising community rubbish clean-up events.

Orr helped to secure the Green Caffeen reusable coffee cup program in the ACT, that has seen a considerable uptake from coffee shops and cafes all around Canberra. Orr was a big advocate in helping push the ACT Government to ban single-use plastics including; plastic cutlery, polystyrene takeaway food and beverage containers and plastic straws.

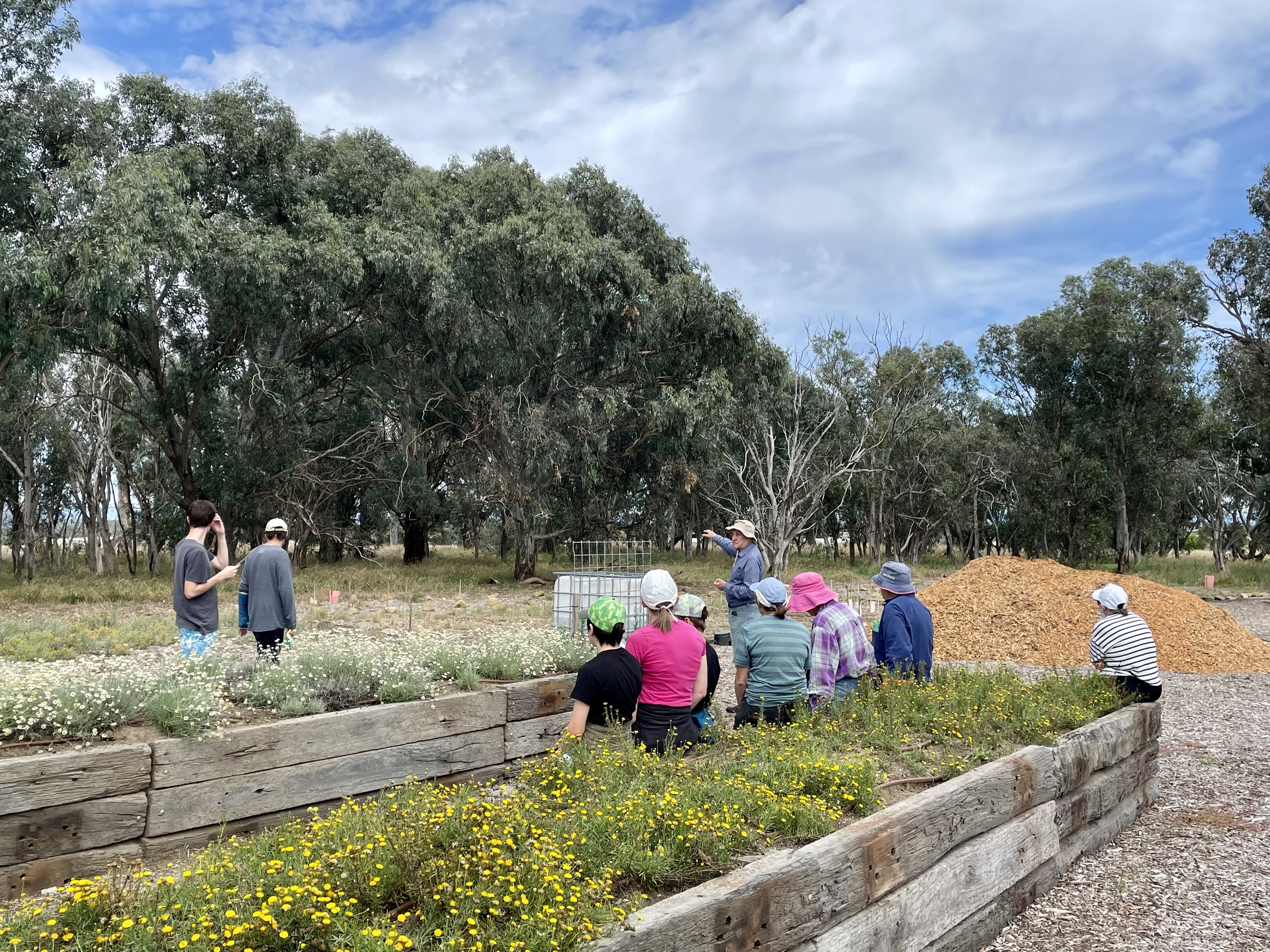
Community members at Budjan Galindji Grassland Nature Reserve

Notably, working with the Friends of Grasslands, Orr campaigned successfully to secure the commitment to have the Budjan Galindji Grassland Nature Reserve listed as a nature reserve and incorporated into the Canberra Nature Park. Following the creation of the reserve a landscape plan has been developed and remediation works are ongoing.

== Personal life ==
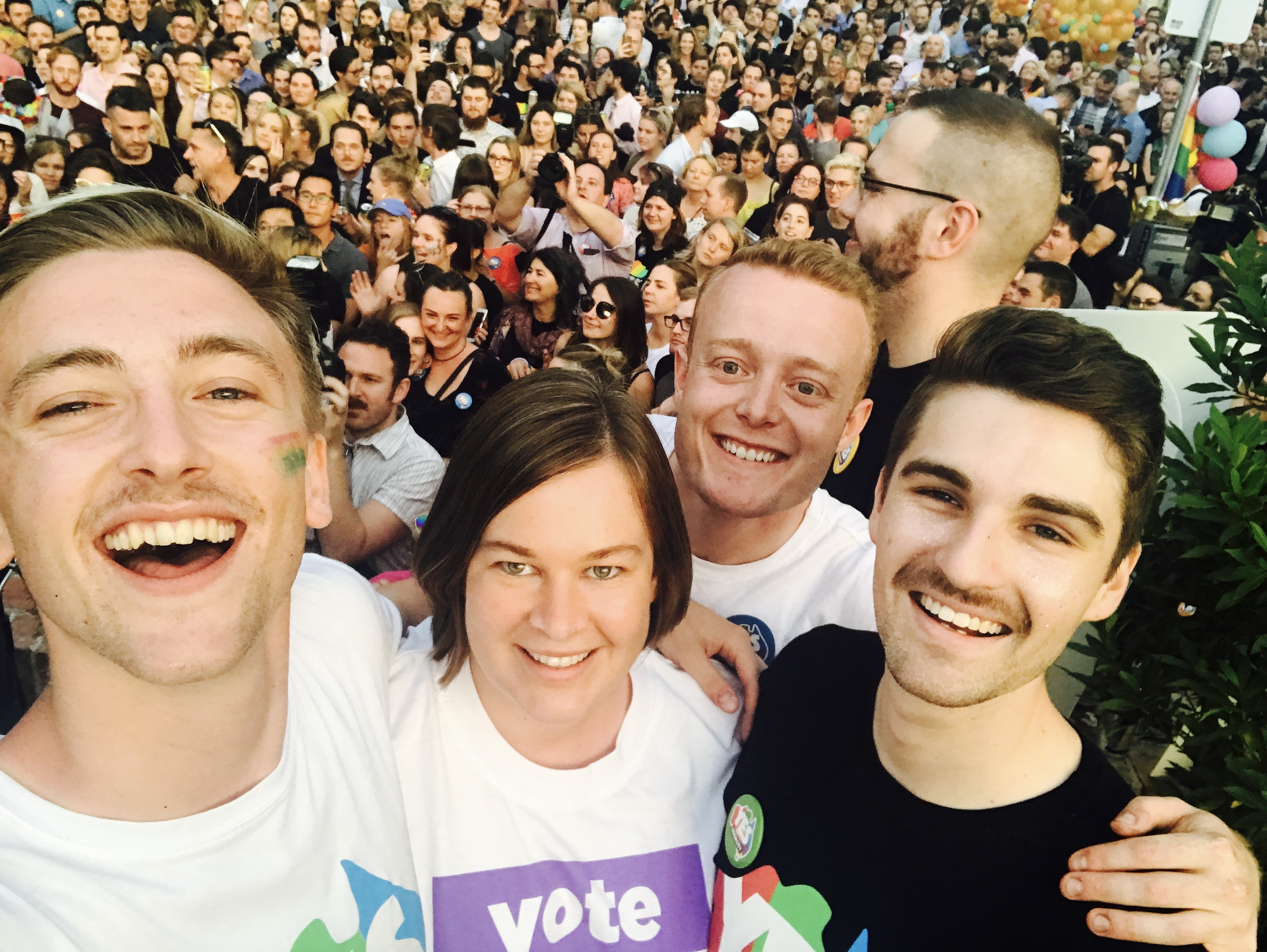
Orr with marriage equality supporters

Orr is a qualified Urban Planner. She has expressed interest about improving urban environments for residents, while at the same time minimising the environmental impact of urban lifestyle.

Orr is member of the LGBT+ community, and was an advocate for same-sex marriage during the 2017 same-sex marriage plebiscite.

Orr has said that she smoked cannabis in her youth.

== See also ==
- List of LGBTI holders of political offices in Australia

Australian Capital Territory Legislative Assembly
Electorate created	Member for Yerrabi; 2016–present	Incumbent
Political offices
Preceded by Chris Steel	Minister for Community Services and Facilities; 2019–present	Incumbent
Preceded by Rachel Stephen-Smith	Minister for Disability; 2016–present	Incumbent
Preceded by Rachel Stephen-Smith	Minister for Children, Youth and Families; 2019–present	Incumbent
Preceded by Gordon Ramsay	Minister for Government Services and Procurement; 2019–present	Incumbent
