= Australian National University Union =

ANU Union Inc.
- Motto: live uni life
- Institution: Australian National University
- Established: 1965; 61 years ago
- Abolished: 2019; 7 years ago
- Members: 22,000
- Website: Archive of anuunion.com.au

The Australian National University Union Incorporated (ANU Union), established in 1965, was a former not-for-profit association that previously operated commercial premises at The Australian National University. The union wound up its operations in January 2020. It is not to be confused with the Australian National University Student Association, which is recognised as the University's Students' Union for advocacy purposes.

== History ==
The Union was set up in 1965 to provide a meeting place for students, graduates and staff.

Due to the redevelopment of Union Court, the Union vacated its premises in 2017. In March 2019, the Union reopened in a new location at 3 Rimmer St ACTON. In January 2020, the Union permanently wound up its operations.

== Membership ==
All students of the University were automatically ANU Union members. Membership was also open to ANU staff and graduates.

== Purpose ==
The objects of the Union were:

1. to provide a recognised meeting place and social centre for its members;
2. to promote the intellectual, social and general welfare of the University community, and
3. actively to encourage and support all ANU clubs and societies which include members of the Union.
