= Labor–Greens coalition =

Political alliance in Australia

- Labor leader: Katy Gallagher (until 2014); Andrew Barr (from 2014)
- Greens leader: Shane Rattenbury
- Founded: 2012; 14 years ago
- Dissolved: 6 November 2024; 2 years ago
- Member parties: ACT Labor; ACT Greens
- Legislative Assembly: 16 / 25 (2020−2024)

The Labor–Greens coalition was a political alliance between the Labor Party and the Greens in the Australian Capital Territory Legislative Assembly. The coalition was first formed following the 2012 election and was renewed after the following two elections. Following the 2024 election it was not renewed and the Greens moved back to the crossbench.

Unlike what generally happens with the Liberal–National Coalition, Labor and the Greens contest ACT elections on separate tickets. From 2020 until 2024, three Greens MLAs were members of the Barr ministry, while the other three effectively sat on the backbench.

== History ==
Following the 2001 election, Labor was supported by the Greens and Democrats in a minority government. Labor won a majority in 2004, but after losing it in 2008 they were again supported by the Greens.

At the 2012 election, Shane Rattenbury was the only Greens MLA to retain his seat in the Legislative Assembly, and entered into a power sharing arrangement to allow the Labor Party to once again form minority government. The Labor Caucus agreed to appoint Rattenbury as a minister in Katy Gallagher's five-member cabinet, and to support various Greens policies.

Rattenbury was re-elected at the 2016 election and joined by party colleague Caroline Le Couteur, taking the Greens tally to 2 out of 25 total seats. As a result, Rattenbury joined the second Barr ministry, although he reserved the right to withdraw from Cabinet discussions on divisive issues and vote independently in the Assembly.

Labor was re-elected with 10 seats of their own in 2020, while the Greens won a record six seats. On the night of the election, Andrew Barr confirmed Labor would again seek to enter into an arrangement with the Greens. Since November 2020, Rattenbury, Rebecca Vassarotti and Emma Davidson have served as Greens ministers, making up a third of the Barr ministry.

The coalition dissolved after the 2024 election, where the Greens lost two seats to Independents. Rattenbury announced on 6 November 2024 that the Greens would be sitting on the crossbench, while continuing to guarantee supply in exchange for Labor adopting Greens policies. The party published the text of the formal agreement in advance of the new legislative term.

In September 2026, after Greens leader Shane Rattenbury resigned from the assembly and Jo Clay assumed the leadership, the Greens announced they had ended the confidence and supply agreement, but stated that they would continue to help pass the budget through the Legislative Assembly.

== Electoral performance ==
=== Legislative Assembly ===
Election	Votes	%	Seats	+/–	Position	Status
2012	109,764	49.58	9 / 17		1st	Coalition
2016	118,920	48.73	14 / 25	▲5	1st	Coalition
2020	138,133	51.32	16 / 25	▲2	1st	Coalition
2024	113,281	46.45	14 / 25	▼2	1st	Confidence and supply

== See also ==
- Labor–Green Accord in Tasmania (1989–1990)
- Liberal–Residents Rally Alliance (1989–1991)
