= Chris Steel =

Australian politician (born 1986)

Chris Steel MLA
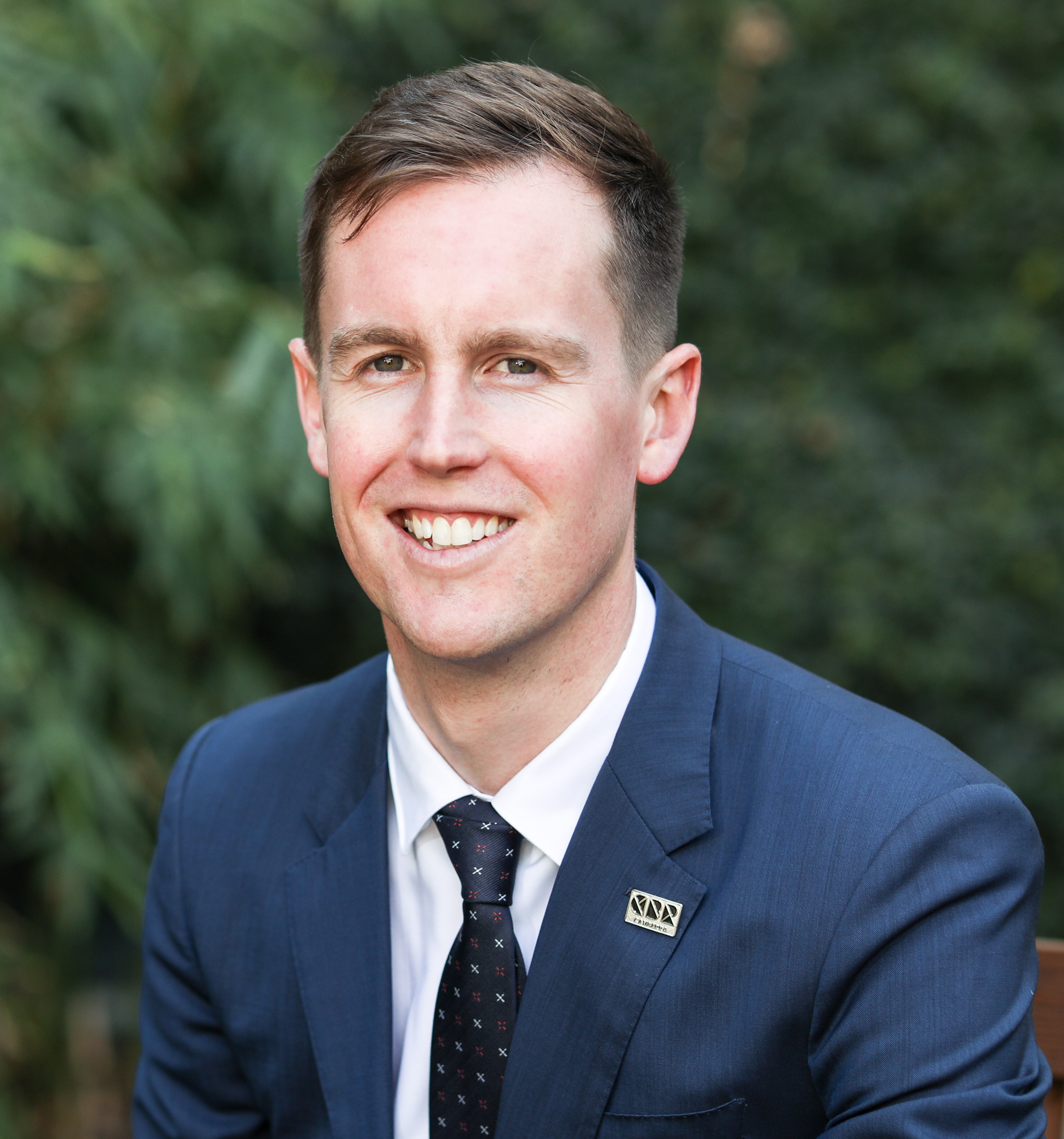

Treasurer of the ACT
- Incumbent
- Assumed office 8 November 2024
- Leader: Andrew Barr
- Preceded by: Andrew Barr

Minister for Planning and Sustainable Development
- Incumbent
- Assumed office 11 December 2023
- Leader: Andrew Barr
- Preceded by: Mick Gentleman

Minister for Heritage
- Incumbent
- Assumed office 8 November 2024
- Leader: Andrew Barr
- Preceded by: Rebecca Vassarotti

Minister for Transport
- In office 1 July 2019 – 4 November 2020
- Leader: Andrew Barr
- Preceded by: Meegan Fitzharris
- Succeeded by: himself
- In office 11 December 2023 – 29 July 2026
- Preceded by: himself
- Succeeded by: Tara Cheyne

Minister for Transport and City Services
- In office 4 November 2020 – 11 December 2023
- Leader: Andrew Barr
- Preceded by: himself across multiple portfolios
- Succeeded by: himself and Tara Cheyne as Minister for City Services

Minister for Skills
- In office 23 March 2020 – 6 November 2024
- Leader: Andrew Barr
- Preceded by: Andrew Barr (as Minister for Tertiary Education)

Special Minister of State
- In office 4 November 2020 – 6 November 2024
- Leader: Andrew Barr
- Preceded by: office established

Minister for City Services
- In office 27 August 2018 – 4 November 2020
- Leader: Andrew Barr
- Preceded by: Meegan Fitzharris
- Succeeded by: himself as Minister for Transport and City Services

Minister for Recycling and Waste Reduction
- In office 27 August 2018 – 4 November 2020
- Leader: Andrew Barr
- Preceded by: Meegan Fitzharris

Minister for Roads and Active Travel
- In office 23 March 2020 – 4 November 2020
- Leader: Andrew Barr
- Preceded by: Meegan Fitzharris

Member of the ACT Legislative Assembly for Murrumbidgee
- Incumbent
- Assumed office 15 October 2016

Personal details
- Born: 15 May 1986 (age 40) Newcastle, New South Wales
- Party: Labor Party
- Spouse: Kurt Oborne
- Education: Australian National University
- Occupation: Education advocate
- Website: www.chrissteel.com.au

Christopher James Steel (born 15 May 1986) is an Australian politician. He has been a Labor member of the Australian Capital Territory Legislative Assembly since 2016, representing the electorate of Murrumbidgee and currently serves as the ACT Treasurer and Cabinet Minister in the ACT Government. Before his election, Steel was an education advocate working in the early childhood sector.

== Early and personal life ==
Steel was born in Newcastle, New South Wales before his family moved to Canberra in the 1980s. As a child he grew up on the Southside in Torrens attending the local public schools, Torrens Primary, Melrose High School and Narrabundah College. He completed his Bachelor of Laws and Bachelor of Arts at the Australian National University.

Steel currently lives in Kambah with his partner Kurt.

== Early career ==
Prior to his election into the ACT Legislative Assembly, Steel worked as the Policy and Research Manager at peak education advocacy group Early Childhood Australia. He has also worked as a policy adviser for both the Australian Government and Australian Capital Territory Government. Prior to being elected to office, Steel volunteered as a Director on the Board of YMCA Canberra.

== Political career ==
On 16 October 2016, Steel was elected to the Ninth Assembly to represent the new electorate of Murrumbidgee receiving 9.1% of the vote. Steel was re-elected at the 2020 ACT Election with 13.8% of the vote. At the 2024 ACT Election, Steel was re-elected for the second time with 11.4% of the vote.

Steel was appointed to Ministry on 27 August 2018 as Minister for City Services, Minister for Roads, Minister for Community Services and Community Facilities, and Minister for Multicultural Affairs. On 1 July 2019 he took on responsibility for the Transport portfolio following Meegan Fitzharris' resignation from the Ministry.

Following the 2020 ACT Election Steel was subsequently re-appointed to the Third Barr Ministry as Minister for Transport and City Services, Minister for Skills, and as Special Minister of State.

Steel was appointed as the Minister for Planning in November 2023, following a mid-term reshuffle. As Minister, Steel has proposed planning changes to permit townhouses, terraces and low-rise apartments to be built in Canberra’s suburbs which had previously been prohibited under the ‘Garden City Variation’ to the Territory Plan in 2003.

Following the 2024 ACT Election, Steel was appointed Treasurer of the Australian Capital Territory in the Fourth Barr Ministry. In his first Territory Budget, he announced a controversial health levy to fund the growing cost of ACT hospitals with a $1.2 billion increase in health expenditure.

== See also ==
- 2016 Australian Capital Territory election
- Members of the Australian Capital Territory Legislative Assembly, 2016–2020
- List of LGBTI holders of political offices in Australia
