= Mick Gentleman =

Australian politician

Mick Gentleman MLA
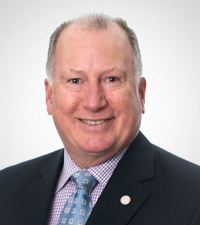

Member of the Australian Capital Territory Legislative Assembly for Brindabella
- In office 31 October 2012 – 19 October 2024
- In office 29 October 2004 – 18 October 2008

Manager of Government Business
- In office 4 November 2020 – 5 November 2024
- Leader: Andrew Barr
- Preceded by: Position established
- Succeeded by: Tara Cheyne

Minister for Business
- In office 12 December 2023 – 5 November 2024
- Leader: Andrew Barr
- Preceded by: Tara Cheyne (Note: As Minister for Business and Better Regulation.)
- Succeeded by: Michael Pettersson (Note: As Minister for Business, Arts and Creative Industries.)

Minister for Fire and Emergency Services
- In office 12 December 2023 – 5 November 2024
- Leader: Andrew Barr
- Preceded by: Himself (Note: As Minister for Police and Emergency Services.)
- Succeeded by: Marisa Paterson (Note: As Minister for Police, Fire and Emergency Services.)

Minister for Industrial Relations and Workplace Safety
- In office 4 November 2020 – 5 November 2024
- Leader: Andrew Barr
- Preceded by: Suzanne Orr (Note: As Minister for Employment and Workplace Safety.)
- Succeeded by: Michael Pettersson (Note: As Minister for Skills, Training and Industrial Relations.)

Minister for Multicultural Affairs
- In office 12 December 2023 – 5 November 2024
- Leader: Andrew Barr
- Preceded by: Tara Cheyne
- Succeeded by: Michael Pettersson

Minister for Police and Crime Prevention
- In office 12 December 2023 – 5 November 2024
- Leader: Andrew Barr
- Preceded by: Himself
- Succeeded by: Marisa Paterson

Personal details
- Born: Michael David Gentleman; 1 August 1955 (age 70) Canberra, Australian Capital Territory
- Party: Labor Party
- Website: https://www.mickgentleman.com.au

Michael "Mick" David Gentleman (born 1 August 1955) is an Australian politician and former member of the Australian Capital Territory Legislative Assembly who represented the electorate of Brindabella for the Labor Party from 2004 to 2008, and again from 2012 to 2024. He was first elected to the assembly in 2004, but lost his seat in the 2008 election. He was re-elected to the Assembly at the 2012, 2016 and 2020 elections, before being defeated at the 2024 election. Gentleman was a Minister in the ACT Government from 2014 until his defeat in 2024.

== Early years ==
Gentleman was born and educated, and has always lived in Canberra, ACT.

Prior to becoming a politician, he worked in the offices of Prime Ministers Bob Hawke and Paul Keating as their security officer. He has also been a motor mechanic, post officer, public servant, real estate agent, small business owner and union organiser.

Gentleman has been involved in motorsports for more than 42 years and was a four-time ACT Rally champion co-driver. He competed in rally at state level, Australia Championship level and in the World Rally Championships.

== Political career ==
Gentleman has served as the Acting Speaker of the Assembly, and chair of the Standing Committee on Planning and Environment. He provided more than 30 reports to the Parliament affecting the business, environmental and residential planning of the capital. Gentleman tabled and passed the gross feed-in-tariff for Canberra.

Gentleman has served as Minister for Police and Emergency Services.

As Minister for the Environment, Gentleman led reforms to outlaw yabby traps and oversaw the recovery plan for Namadgi National Park following the damage by bushfires in early 2020. Gentleman supports protecting Namadgi National Park from potential damage caused by feral horses.

In the final arrangement of the Third Barr ministry, Gentleman was the Manager of Government Business, as well as the Minister for Business, for Fire and Emergency Services, for Industrial Relations and Workplace Safety, for Multicultural Affairs, and for Police and Crime Prevention.

Over his career, Gentleman has also held the ministerial portfolios for Planning, for Community Services, for Children and Young People, for Ageing, for Roads and Parking, for Planning and Land Management, for Racing and Gaming, for Environment and Heritage, for Urban Renewal, for Advanced Technology and Space Industries, and for Corrections.
