= Rachel Stephen-Smith =

Australian politician (born 1971)

Rachel Stephen-Smith MLA
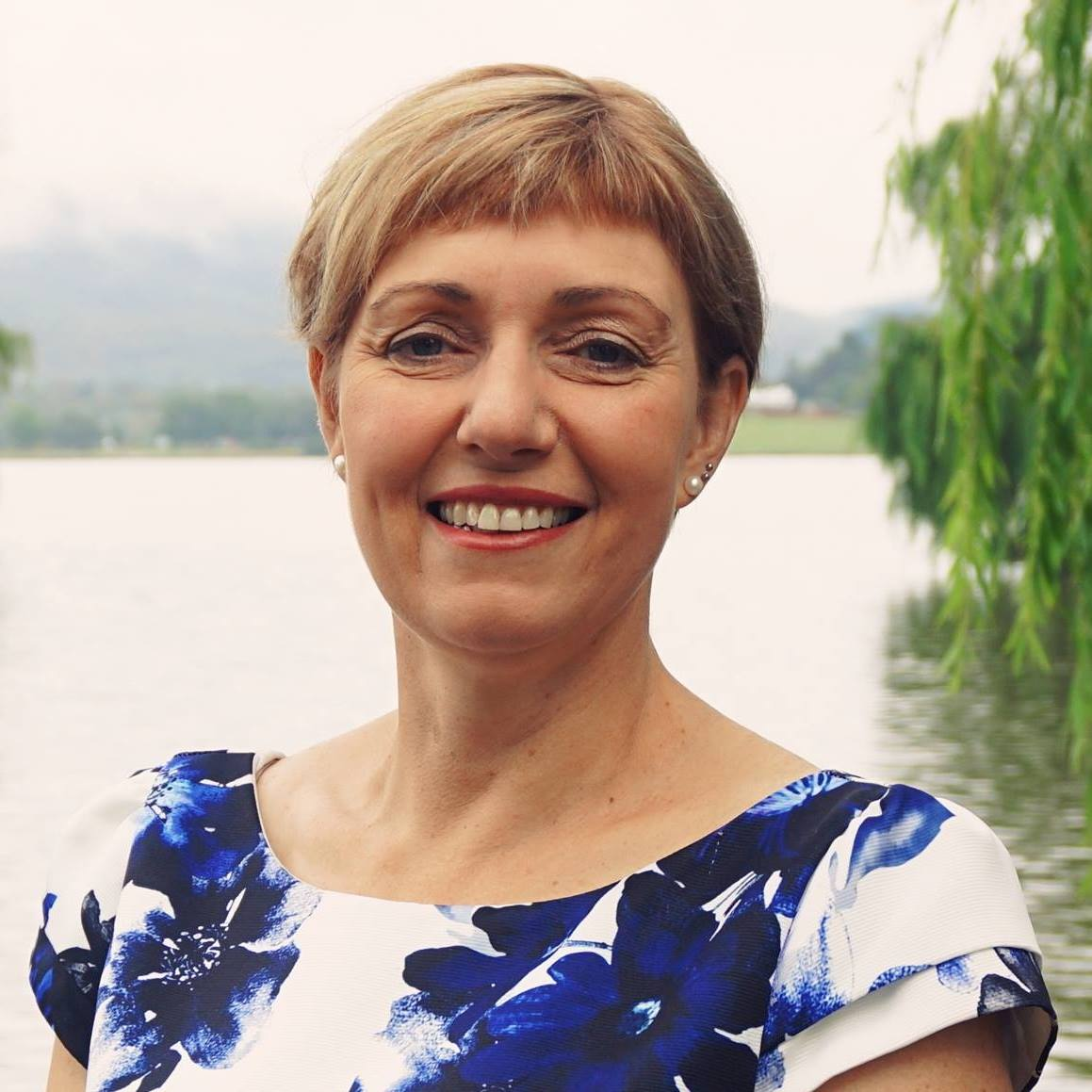

14th Deputy Chief Minister of the Australian Capital Territory
- Incumbent
- Assumed office 23 July 2026
- Chief Minister: Andrew Barr
- Preceded by: Yvette Berry

Deputy Leader of the Australian Labor Party (ACT Branch)
- Incumbent
- Assumed office 23 July 2026
- Leader: Andrew Barr
- Preceded by: Yvette Berry

Minister for Education
- Incumbent
- Assumed office 30 July 2026
- Chief Minister: Andrew Barr
- Preceded by: Yvette Berry

Minister for Child Development and Wellbeing
- Incumbent
- Assumed office 30 July 2026
- Chief Minister: Andrew Barr
- Preceded by: Position established

Minister for Health Infrastructure
- Incumbent
- Assumed office 30 July 2026
- Chief Minister: Andrew Barr
- Preceded by: Position established

Minister for Finance Minister for the Public Service
- Incumbent
- Assumed office 8 November 2024
- Chief Minister: Andrew Barr
- Preceded by: Chris Steel (as Special Minister of State)

Minister for Health Minister for Mental Health
- Incumbent
- Assumed office 1 July 2019
- Chief Minister: Andrew Barr
- Preceded by: Meegan Fitzharris

Member of the ACT Legislative Assembly for Kurrajong
- Incumbent
- Assumed office 15 October 2016

Personal details
- Born: 1971 (age 54–55) Canberra
- Party: Labor Party
- Education: Australian National University
- Website: www.rachelstephensmith.com.au

Rachel Stephen-Smith (born 1971) is an Australian politician. She has been a Labor member of the Australian Capital Territory Legislative Assembly since 2016, representing the electorate of Kurrajong.

== Early life and education ==
Stephen-Smith grew up in O'Connor in Canberra's inner-north and attended local schools such as Lyneham High. Following school, Stephen-Smith attended the Australian National University and studied economics.

== Career ==
Stephen-Smith previously worked as a senior public servant in the Australian Capital Territory public service, the Department of Prime Minister and Cabinet and as a Chief of Staff to Senator Kim Carr. Stephen-Smith has also worked in Washington DC at the Australian Embassy.

Following her election, Stephen-Smith was immediately appointed to cabinet, holding the following portfolios: Community Services and Social Inclusion; Disability, Children and Youth; Aboriginal and Torres Strait Islander Affairs; Multicultural Affairs; and Workplace Safety and Industrial Relations.

After a Cabinet reshuffle in August 2018, Stephen-Smith lost the Multicultural Affairs and Community Services portfolios to new Cabinet member Chris Steel, gaining the Government Services and Procurement and Urban Renewal portfolios. In July 2019, Stephen-Smith gained the Health portfolio from Meegan Fitzharris who resigned from the Cabinet, but due to the increase of workload, she later relinquished the Disability and Workplace Safety portfolios to Suzanne Orr in August 2019.

Australian Capital Territory Legislative Assembly
Electorate created	Member for Kurrajong; 2016–present	Incumbent
Political offices
Preceded by Meegan Fitzharris	Minister for Health; 2019–present	Incumbent
Preceded by	Minister for Aboriginal and Torres Strait Islander Affairs; 2016–present	Incumbent
Preceded by	Minister for Children, Youth and Families; 2016–present	Incumbent
Preceded by	Minister for Urban Renewal; 2016–present	Incumbent
Preceded by	Minister for Disability; 2016–2019	Succeeded by Suzanne Orr
Preceded by	Minister for Employment and Workplace Safety; 2016–2019	Succeeded by Suzanne Orr
Preceded by	Minister for Government Services and Procurement; 2016–2019	Succeeded by Gordon Ramsay
Preceded by	Minister for Multicultural Affairs; 2016–2018	Succeeded by Chris Steel
Preceded by	Minister for Community Services and Social Inclusion; 2016–2018	Succeeded by Chris Steel
