= Andrew Barr =

Chief Minister of the Australian Capital Territory since 2014

Andrew Barr MLA
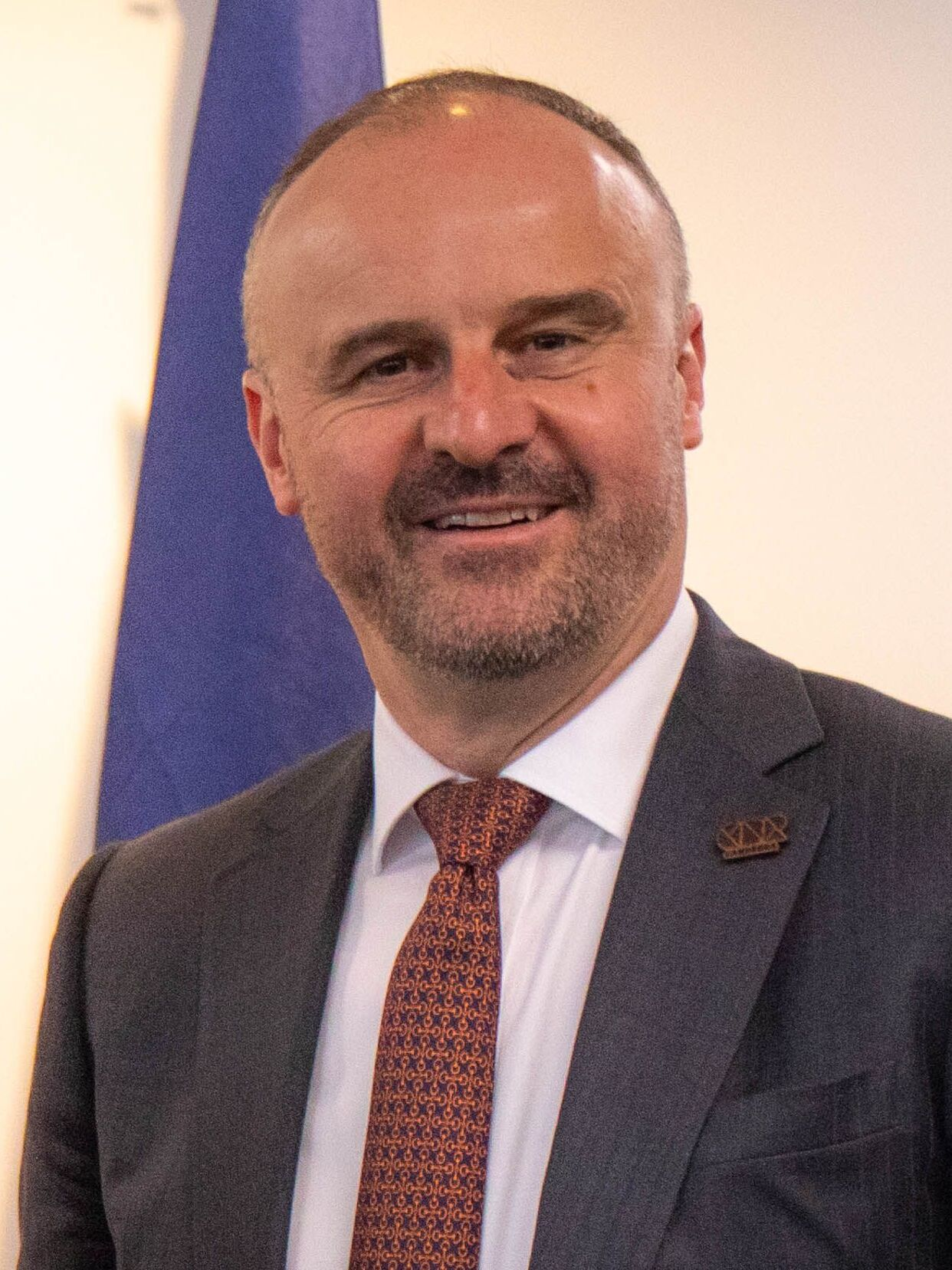
- Barr in 2025

7th Chief Minister of the Australian Capital Territory
- Incumbent
- Assumed office 11 December 2014
- Deputy: Simon Corbell; Yvette Berry; Rachel Stephen-Smith
- Preceded by: Katy Gallagher

11th Deputy Chief Minister of the Australian Capital Territory
- In office 16 May 2011 – 11 December 2014
- Leader: Katy Gallagher
- Preceded by: Katy Gallagher
- Succeeded by: Simon Corbell

Treasurer of the Australian Capital Territory
- In office 1 July 2011 – 8 November 2024
- Preceded by: Katy Gallagher
- Succeeded by: Chris Steel

Member of the Australian Capital Territory Legislative Assembly for Kurrajong Molonglo (2006–2016)
- Incumbent
- Assumed office 5 April 2006
- Preceded by: Ted Quinlan

Personal details
- Born: Andrew James Barr; 29 April 1973 (age 53) Lismore, New South Wales, Australia
- Party: Labor
- Spouse: Anthony Toms (m. 2019)
- Education: Australian National University
- Cabinet: Barr ministry I; II; III; IV
- Website: www.andrewbarr.com.au

Andrew James Barr (born 29 April 1973) is an Australian politician who has been serving as the 7th and current chief minister of the Australian Capital Territory since 2014. Barr was previously the Treasurer of the Australian Capital Territory from 2011 to 2024. He has been the leader of the Australian Capital Territory branch of the Australian Labor Party (ALP) since 2014 and a member (MLA) of the ACT Legislative Assembly since 2006. He is the longest serving chief minister in the ACT since the territory gained self government in 1989.

Barr was immediately promoted to Cabinet upon his election to replace former Treasurer Ted Quinlan, who resigned mid-term. On 11 December 2014 he was elected as Chief Minister after his predecessor, Katy Gallagher, resigned and announced her intention to run for the Senate. In addition to being Chief Minister, he holds the portfolios of Economic Development and Tourism and Trade.

Barr is the first openly gay head of the ACT government (from 2014), and was the first openly gay member as well as government cabinet minister in the ACT Legislative Assembly from 2006.

== Early life ==
Barr was born in Lismore, New South Wales, and was raised in Canberra, attending Holt Pre-School, the AME School, Turner Primary School, Lyneham High School and Lake Ginninderra College. He studied political science, economics and economic history at the Australian National University, graduating with a Bachelor of Arts (Policy Studies). Barr became involved in student politics, serving as Treasurer of the Australian National University Students' Association and as a director on the board of the Australian National University Union.

== Career ==
=== Early career ===
After graduating in 1995, Barr worked for the Federal parliamentarian Annette Ellis and later the then ACT Opposition Leader Jon Stanhope, before embarking on a career change to the private sector in 1999 as a media analyst and account manager.

During the 1990s Barr became a leading influence within the right faction of ACT Labor (Centre Coalition) and was involved in the successful election of the first non-left faction ACT party secretary, Michael Kerrisk. In 2006, Barr said, "When I came out in the late '90s I had already been in the party for some eight years, so people were already used to me.... But it was at this time though that I decided to step back from front-line politics. It was a big change in my life and it was at this time that I met my partner Anthony, so I just needed time to adjust."

=== Return to politics ===
Barr returned to political life in 2002 as a senior adviser to John Hargreaves, the Government Whip. Following Hargreaves' election to the ministry in November 2004, Barr was appointed his chief of staff – a position he held until his election to the Assembly in April 2006.

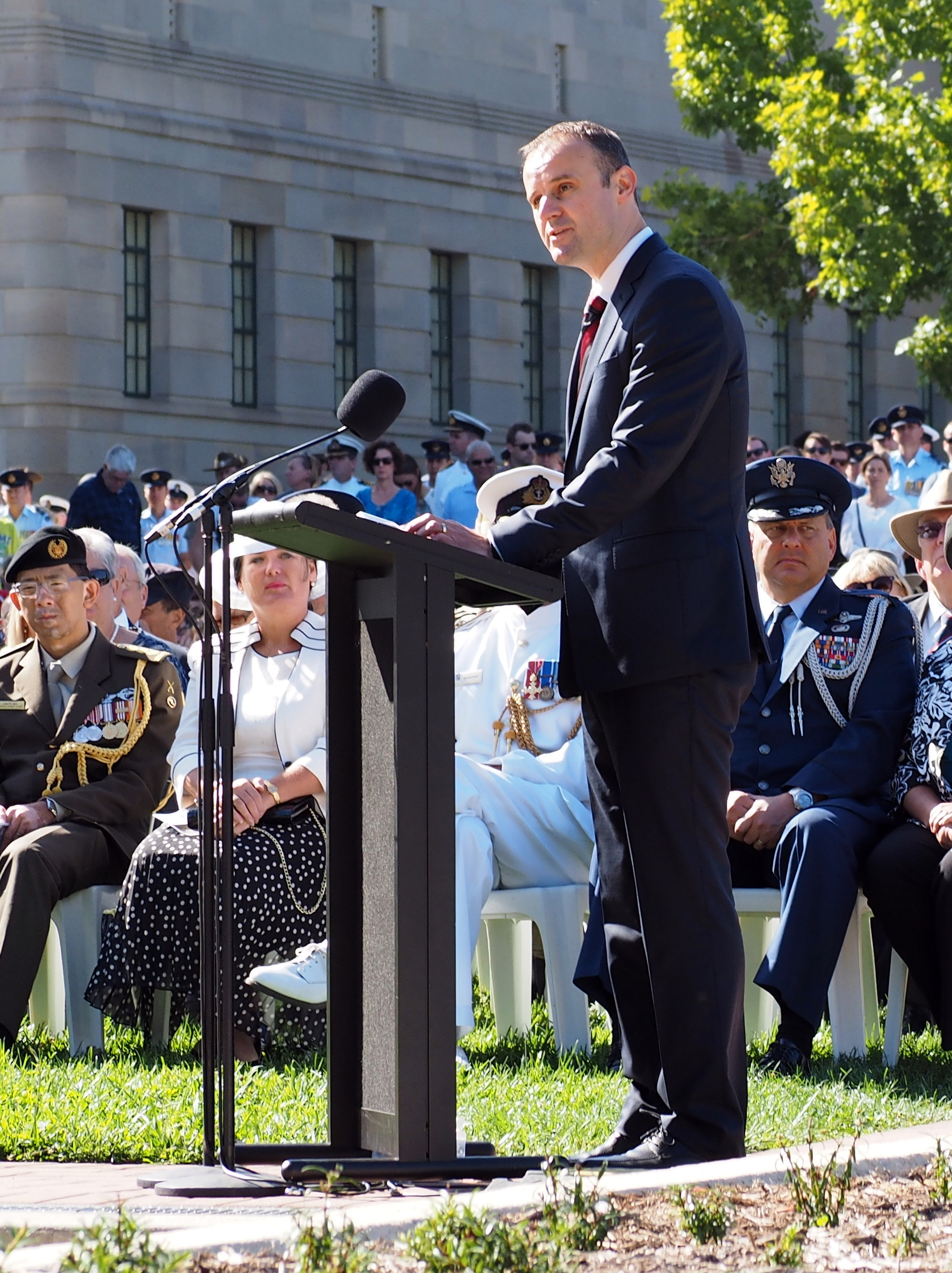
Barr speaking at a 2015 ceremony at the Australian War Memorial

In early 2004, Barr won pre-selection for the Labor ticket in the seven-member Molonglo electorate, which included Barr's suburb of Dickson and that of his previous residence in Braddon. He campaigned largely on financial management, housing affordability and urban infrastructure issues, such as balanced territory budgets, tax concessions for first home buyers, inner city parking permits and footpath and street lighting upgrades, while also expressing support for gay law reform, the reproductive rights of women, multiculturalism and refugees. Barr polled strongly in inner city booths and ultimately found himself in contention for the seventh and final Molonglo seat, along with Liberals Jacqui Burke, Zed Seselja and fellow Labor candidate Mike Hettinger, but narrowly missed out, coming in tenth.

Barr continued working for Hargreaves after the election, but received a second chance at entering the Assembly when the Treasurer, Ted Quinlan, resigned in March 2006. The resulting countback saw the redistribution of Quinlan's primary vote and Barr's election to the ACT Legislative Assembly.

Quinlan's resignation from the Assembly sparked a ministerial reshuffle, with Barr immediately entering the ministry upon taking his seat. He was assigned the Education, Training, Industrial Relations, Sport and Tourism portfolios. Barr dedicated most of his maiden speech to economic management, housing affordability and progressive social reform

Barr was re-elected to the seat of Molonglo for the 2008 and 2012 ACT elections. Following a major redistribution, he was elected to the seat of Kurrajong at the 2016 election and re-elected in 2020.

=== Chief Minister ===
Following the resignation of Jon Stanhope in May 2011, Barr was appointed Deputy Chief Minister in the cabinet of new Chief Minister Katy Gallagher. Following Gallagher's resignation to run for the Senate, Barr was elected as Chief Minister on 11 December 2014. As leader, Barr led ACT Labor to a fifth consecutive general election win in October 2016.

Since June 2024, Barr is the longest serving Chief Minister of the ACT, overtaking Stanhope who served for about 9.5 years. As of May 2025, Barr is also the longest serving incumbent state or territory leader in Australia, and the last remaining state or territory leader since the commencement of the COVID-19 pandemic in Australia in March 2020.

==== Economic development and taxation reforms ====
In 2012, following a review by former Treasurer Ted Quinlan, Barr announced a 20-year program to transform the ACT taxation system, with the intention of making the system fairer, simpler and more efficient. This program includes the abolition of stamp duty on property transfers and insurance premiums, with the foregone revenue replaced through the general rates system—an approach supported by most economists. New South Wales and Victoria have expressed support for similar reforms.

As Treasurer and Chief Minister, Barr has focused on the ACT's economic development, particularly encouraging private sector investment in higher education, trade, tourism, major events, arts and sport. Consequently, the ACT economy and employment has diversified away from its traditional public sector base.

In 2016, the ACT Government secured international flights for Canberra, with Singapore Airlines operating a 'Capital Express' route linking Singapore, Canberra and Wellington, and Qatar Airways operating flights via Sydney. In the same year, he established the Office of the Commissioner for International Engagement, with responsibility for building and cultivating international relationships for the economic, social and cultural benefit of the ACT.

In October 2019, Barr launched the ACT Government's Infrastructure Plan outlining key health, transport, education and environmental infrastructure priorities including a new hospital and stadium, Canberra Institute of Technology (CIT) campus upgrades and stage 2 of light rail.

In 2020, Barr announced a major expansion of UNSW Canberra, with the establishment of a new campus in Canberra's centre on the existing CIT site.

==== Public transport ====
The construction of Canberra's light rail line was part of a governing agreement reached by the Barr government's predecessor, the Gallagher government, with ACT Greens following the 2012 ACT election, at which ACT Labor required the Greens' support to form the government. This agreement remained in place after the 2016 ACT election returned the Labor-Greens government.

In April 2019, Stage 1 of the Canberra light rail launched, connecting Canberra's northern suburbs in Gungahlin with the city's centre via the Northbourne Avenue corridor.

In September 2019, the Barr Government approved the business case for stage 2A of the light rail, which is to extend the line with three additional stops from the city centre to Commonwealth Park. This first requires London Circuit to be raised, works for which commenced in November 2022.

In October 2024, works began to install MyWay+, a new ticketing system for all public transport in Canberra. Completed in November 2024, this new ticketing system allows for more accurate real-time location transport data and the ability to pay with credit cards, smartphones, and wearable devices.

==== Clean energy ====
Barr's government has continued its predecessors' climate change policies, including reducing carbon emissions and increasing the use of renewable energy. Under its Climate Change Strategy, the ACT Government has a target of reducing emissions by 50–60% (from 1990 levels) by 2025 and net zero emissions by 2045. In May 2019, the ACT joined other jurisdictions around the world in declaring a state of climate emergency.

In 2020, the ACT became the first major jurisdiction outside of the European Union to achieve net-zero greenhouse gas emissions electricity supply.

In 2021, the Barr Government launched its 'Sustainable Household Scheme', offering zero-interest loans of up to $15,000 for eligible households to make electrification upgrades such as rooftop solar panels, household battery storage systems, electric vehicles and heating efficiency.

In July 2022, the Barr Government announced its intention to place a ban on the sale of new petrol cars in the ACT from 2035. As of 2023, the ACT has the highest adoption of electric vehicles of all the Australian states and territories, with an estimated 20% of all new vehicle purchases being electric.

In June 2023, the Barr Government passed legislation to ban the installation of gas connections in new buildings in the ACT. This ban came into effect in December 2023.

==== Recycling and circular economy ====
As part of its 'Everyday climate choices' campaign, the Barr government has promoted measures towards a circular economy.

In June 2018, the Barr government launched a container deposit scheme. It is estimated that, in the first four years of the scheme, it resulted in the recycling of 300 million recycled containers.

In April 2019, the Barr government complete its roll-out of vegetation waste collection bins to all Canberra suburbs. In November 2021, it launched a pilot program for bin collection of food and garden organics (FOGO) in select suburbs, which was expanded to more suburbs in September 2024.

Since 2021, the Barr government has also pursued a staggered increase in restrictions on the supply or sale of single-use plastics by businesses. As of 2024, the restrictions apply to single-use plastic cutlery, stirrers, straws, polystyrene takeaway containers, non-compostable coffee cups, heavyweight plastic bags, and degradable plastic.

==== Euthanasia ====
In December 2022, the federal Australian Parliament repealed the federal ban on the ACT and Northern Territory legislating euthanasia. Following this repeal, in June 2024, the Barr government passed legislation in the ACT Parliament to legalise euthanasia for adults residing in the ACT with a condition that is advanced, progressive, and expected to cause death. This legalisation came into effect in November 2025.

==== LGBTI rights ====
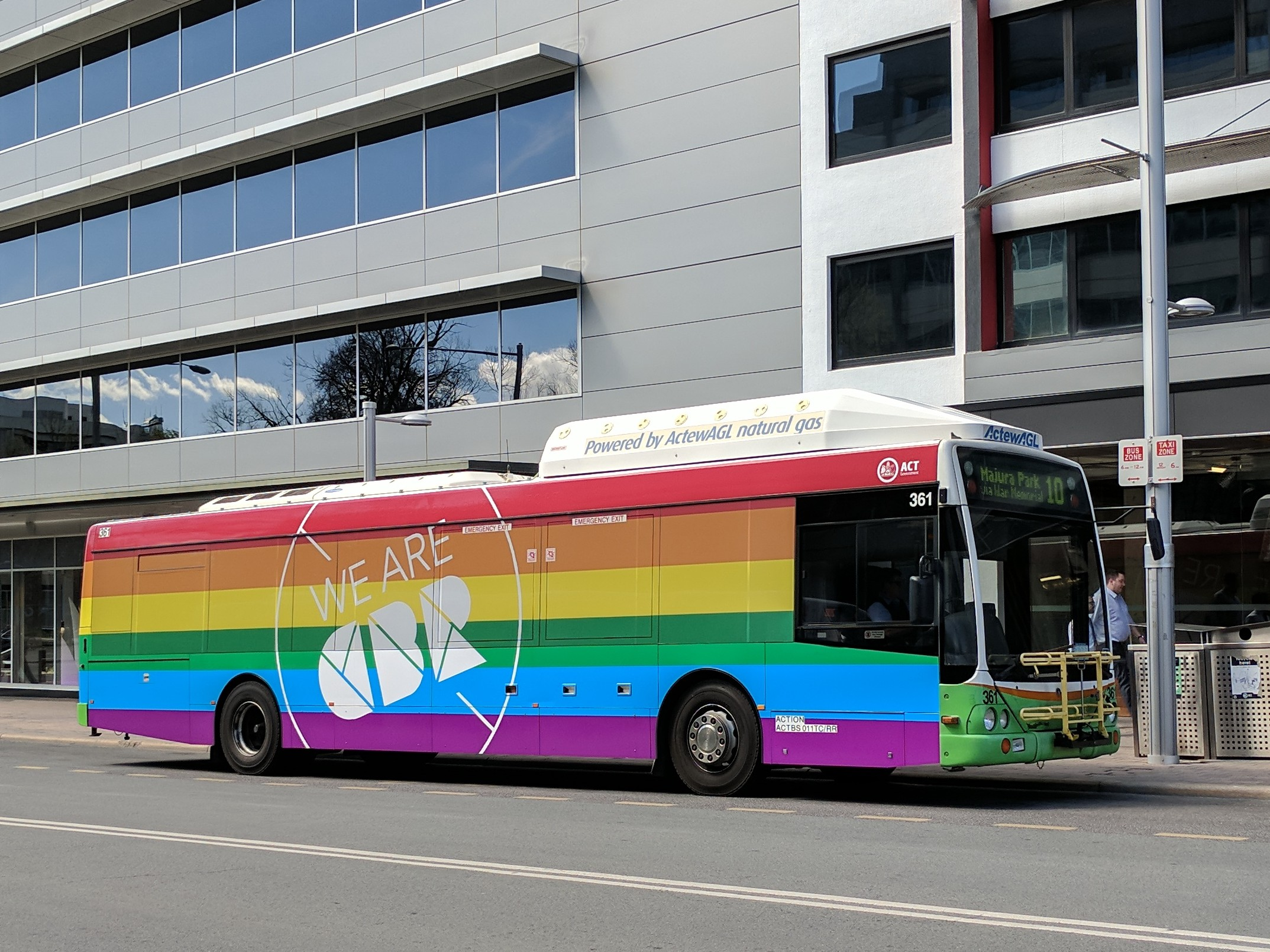
A Canberra bus with rainbow wrap advertising as support from the ACT Government for the city's LGBTIQ community during the survey period.

Barr has been a strong supporter of same-sex marriage and LGBTI rights, voting in favour of anti-discrimination law reform, civil unions, civil partnerships and same-sex marriage laws.

His government has continued to support anti-discrimination and inclusivity of LGBTI communities. In 2017, Barr was a prominent advocate for the 'Yes' campaign in the Australian Marriage Law Postal Survey, in which the ACT had the highest Yes result (74%) and participation rate (82.5%) in Australia. The ACT Government gave official support to the "Yes" campaign.

In 2018, his government announced its intention to remove the ability for religious schools to discriminate against LGBTI teachers.

In 2020, the Barr government passed legislation that bans LGBTI conversion therapy.

== Personal life ==
Barr married his long-term partner Anthony Toms on 13 November 2019, becoming the first leader of an Australian state or territory government to marry someone of the same sex. He met Toms 18 years prior at the LGBTQ club Meridian.

Barr has admitted to eating a pot brownie before.

== See also ==
- List of openly LGBT heads of government
- List of LGBTI holders of political offices in Australia
- 2020 Australian Capital Territory election

Political offices
Preceded by Katy Gallagher	Deputy Chief Minister of the Australian Capital Territory; 2011–2014	Succeeded by Simon Corbell
Preceded by Katy Gallagher	Chief Minister of the Australian Capital Territory; 2014–present	Incumbent
