= Gordon Ramsay (politician) =

Australian politician

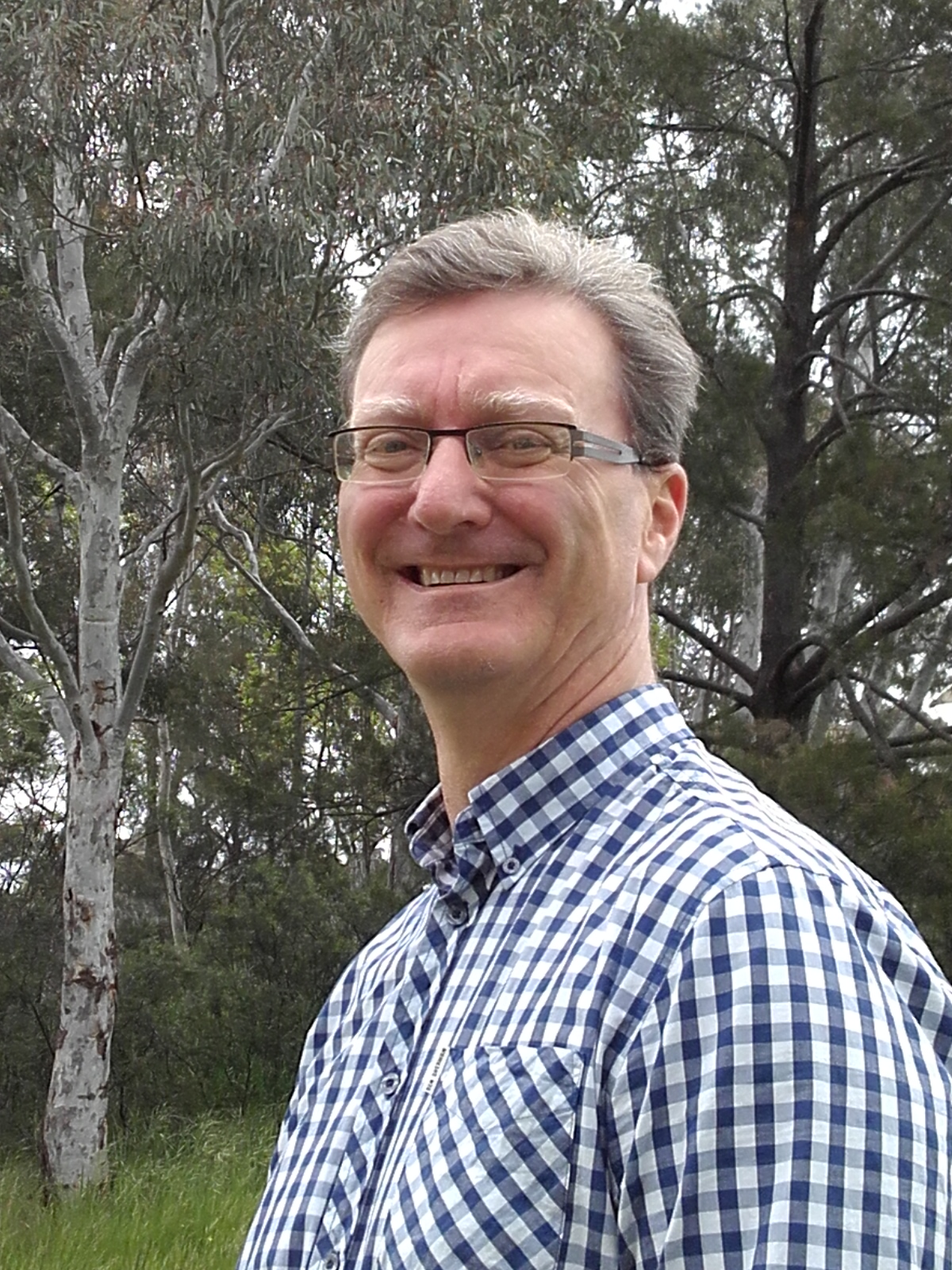
- Gordon Ramsay, October 2016

Attorney-General
- In office 31 October 2016 – 17 October 2020
- Leader: Andrew Barr
- Preceded by: Simon Corbell
- Succeeded by: Shane Rattenbury

Assembly Member for Ginninderra
- In office 15 October 2016 – 17 October 2020

Personal details
- Born: 1964 (age 61–62)
- Party: Labor
- Spouse: Lyndelle Ramsay
- Occupation: Uniting Church minister
- Profession: Solicitor
- Criminal information
- Criminal charge: One count of encouraging a young person to commit an act of a sexual nature

Gordon Ramsay (born 1964) is an Australian politician who served in the Legislative Assembly of the Australian Capital Territory (ACT), representing the Ginninderra electorate from 2016 to 2020. He was elected to be a Minister in the Barr government.

Ramsay is also a minister of the Uniting Church in Australia, and was earlier a lawyer in New South Wales.

In October 2025, Ramsay was charged with grooming a teenager.

== Early life ==
Ramsay was raised in the southern Sydney suburb of Banksia, and attended primary schools at Rockdale and Hurstville before Sydney Boys' High School. He studied law at the University of Sydney graduating with a degree of Bachelor of Arts LLB (Hons), and then was admitted as a solicitor.

== Uniting Church ==
Ramsay felt called to Christian ministry, and undertook the selection processes of the Uniting Church in Australia (UCA) before being accepted for training at the Uniting Church Centre for Ministry in Sydney. He first served at Kingsgrove/Bardwell Park UCA.

=== 1997–2016 ===
From 1997 to 2016, he was the Executive Minister at Kippax Uniting Church in the north-western suburbs of Canberra, Australian Capital Territory. This untypically long period of ministry in one church was characterised by his evolution as a spokesperson and organiser for social justice. The major speech at his end-of-ministry ceremony on 3 April 2016 was given by Lin Hatfield Dodds. He remained a Minister of the UCA, in a similar way that Hon. Brian Howe remained a UCA Minister while serving in the Parliament of Australia.

During this period, he worked in the ACT Anti Poverty Week, ACT Council of Social Services, and was a member of the ACT Community Inclusion Board and a Community Inclusion Advocate. He was a Community Champion for the 2020 Time To Talk movement, and a member of the ACT Better Services Taskforce. In 2012, Ramsay led the ACT Targeted Assistance Strategy.

He was a finalist in the 2015 ACT Local Hero category of the Australian of the Year awards.

He served on the Board of UnitingCare NSW–ACT (later "Uniting") from 2011, and chaired the Board from 2014 to 2016.

Accused of Child Grooming in October 2025. Currently scheduled for supreme court in August 2026

== Political career ==
Ramsay announced his candidacy for the Labor Party in the 2016 Australian Capital Territory election, for the Ginninderra electorate. His election material dubbed him "Our Gordon Ramsay" and used visual metaphors from the other (chef) Gordon Ramsay. He was initially indicated to be the third Labor candidate in the five member electorate. Ramsay finished the count 722 votes ahead of Greens candidate Indra Esguerra, and was thus a recipient of a distribution from her in the last round.

At the first Labor Caucus meeting, on 24 October 2016, Ramsay was elected to the new seven-member Cabinet. Throughout his parliamentary term he serves as minister for the following portfolios:

- Attorney-General (October 2016 – 2020)
- Minister for Regulatory Services (including the racing and gaming industries.)
- Minister for the Arts, Creative Industries and Cultural Events (October 2016 – 2020)
- Minister for Building Quality Improvement (August 2018 – 2020)
- Minister for Business and Regulatory Services (October 2016 – 2020)
- Minister for Seniors and Veterans (October 2016 – 2020)
- Minister for Government Services and Procurement (July 2019 – August 2019)

In the 2020 Australian Capital Territory election, Ramsay lost the last seat decided by 167 votes to ACT Liberals candidate, Peter Cain, with the result being announced late on 23 October 2020. Ramsay increased his personal vote from 8.3 per cent in 2016 to 8.5 per cent, but did not benefit from the boost that most sitting MLAs receive.

Formerly a member of Labor Left, in 2018 it was reported that Ramsay was unaligned, though often sided with the Left.

== Post politics ==
Ramsay established a consultancy business in November 2020.

In October 2025, Ramsay was charged with grooming a teenager.
