= Yvette Berry =

Australian politician (born 1968)

Yvette Berry MLA
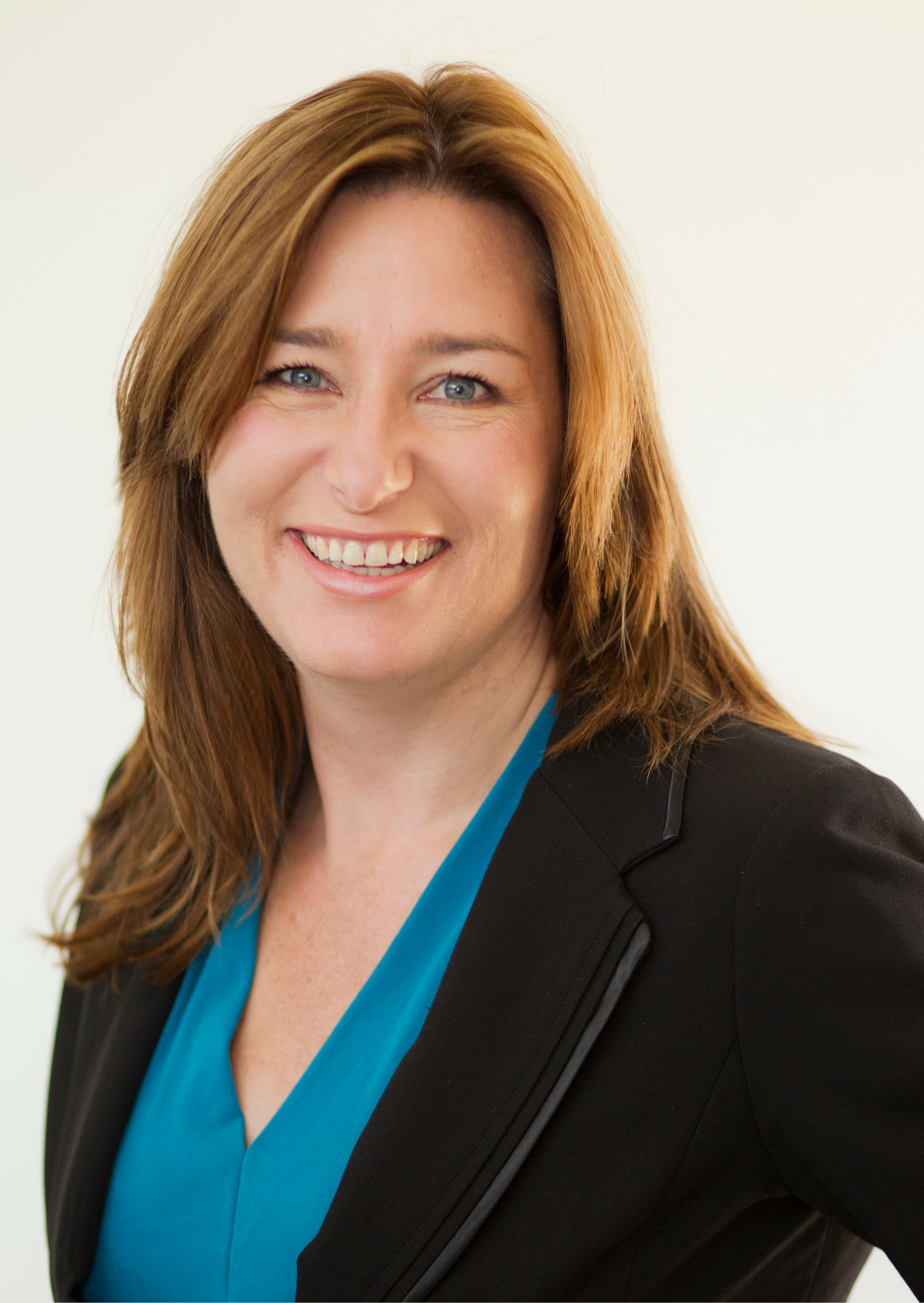

13th Deputy Chief Minister of the Australian Capital Territory
- In office 31 October 2016 – 23 July 2026
- Leader: Andrew Barr
- Preceded by: Simon Corbell
- Succeeded by: Rachel Stephen-Smith

Minister for Education and Early Childhood Development
- In office 8 November 2024 – 23 July 2026
- Preceded by: Herself (Note: As Minister for Minister for Education and Youth Affairs)
- Succeeded by: Rachel Stephen-Smith

Deputy Leader of the Australian Labor Party (ACT Branch)
- In office 31 October 2016 – 27 July 2026
- Leader: Andrew Barr
- Preceded by: Simon Corbell
- Succeeded by: Rachel Stephen-Smith

Member of the Australian Capital Territory Legislative Assembly for Ginninderra
- Incumbent
- Assumed office 20 October 2012

Minister for Minister for Homes, Homelessness and New Suburbs
- In office 1 July 2025 – 23 July 2026
- Preceded by: Herself (Note: As Minister for Homes and New Suburbs)
- Succeeded by: Vacant

Minister for Sport and Recreation
- In office 22 January 2016 – 23 July 2026
- Preceded by: Andrew Barr
- Succeeded by: Vacant

Personal details
- Born: Yvette Simone Berry; 1 August 1968 (age 57)
- Party: Labor Party
- Relations: Wayne Berry (father)
- Occupation: Union organiser
- Website: www.yvetteberry.com.au

Yvette Simone Berry (born 1 August 1968) is an Australian politician who previously served as Deputy Chief Minister of the Australian Capital Territory. She has been a Labor Party member for the seat of Ginninderra in the ACT Legislative Assembly since the 2012 ACT election.

Berry is the daughter of Wayne Berry who was a Member of the ACT Assembly for Ginninderra from 1989 to 2008, Deputy Chief Minister from 1991 to 1994, Opposition Leader from 1997 to 1998 and Speaker from 2001 to 2008. Berry is the first family member of a current or previous member to be elected to the ACT assembly.

== Biography ==
For schooling, Berry attended Holt Primary School, Ginninderra District High School and Hawker College.

Prior to her election to the Assembly Berry worked as a community organiser for the United Voice (formerly called the Liquor, Hospitality and Miscellaneous Workers Union (LHMU)) trade union for more than 15 years representing workers and their families to win fairer wages and better conditions. She was active in the Clean Start campaign to improve jobs for cleaners in the CBD office cleaning industry and coordinated the Big Steps campaign to win professional wages for Early Childhood Educators in the early childhood education sector. Before she started working at the LHMU Berry commenced her working life in the hospitality industry where she worked for 8 years.

Berry has two children and lives with her family in the West Belconnen suburb of Macgregor.

== Political career ==
Berry chaired the Legislative Assembly's ‘Select Committee on Regional Development’ which undertook an inquiry into regional development from February 2013 to February 2014.

In 2014 Berry was a member of the following Standing Committees: Public Accounts (PAC), Health, Ageing, Community and Social Services (HACS), Education, Training and Youth Affairs (ETYA) and Chair of the Planning, Environment and Territory and Municipal Services (PETAMS) Standing Committee.

Berry voted for the Legislative Assembly's 'Marriage Equality (Same Sex) Act 2013'

On 20 January, Chief Minister Andrew Barr appointed Berry a Minister in his Government. She assumed the following portfolios: Women, Aboriginal and Torres Strait Islander Affairs, Housing, Community Services and Social Inclusion, Multicultural and Youth Affairs and she was made Minister assisting the Chief Minister on Social Inclusion and Equality.

Following the ACT 2016 election, Berry was appointed Deputy Chief Minister in the re-elected Barr Labor Government. This is the same position her father, Wayne, held between 1991 and 1994. She assumed portfolio responsibilities for Education and Early Childhood Development, Housing and Suburban Development, Prevention of Domestic and Family Violence, Sport and Recreation, while retaining portfolio responsibilities for Women.

On 23 July 2026, Berry resigned from the Fourth Barr ministry to sit as a bachbencher following the handing down of a report from the Integrity Commission which found "serious corrupt conduct" of her former Chief of Staff and the director general of the Education Directorate.
