= Electoral results for Murrumbidgee electorate =

This is a list of electoral results for Murrumbidgee electorate in ACT Legislative Assembly elections since its creation.

== Election results ==
=== Elections in the 2020s ===
==== 2024 ====
2024 Australian Capital Territory election: Murrumbidgee
Party	Candidate	Votes	%	±%
Quota		9,309		
Liberal	Jeremy Hanson (elected 1)	7,380	13.2	−2.1
Liberal	Ed Cocks (elected 4)	4,027	7.2	+2.3
Liberal	Amardeep Singh	4,019	7.2	+1.2
Liberal	Karen Walsh	2,486	4.5	+4.5
Liberal	Elyse Heslehurst	1,666	3.0	+3.0
Labor	Chris Steel (elected 2)	6,345	11.4	−2.4
Labor	Marisa Paterson (elected 5)	5,176	9.3	+1.5
Labor	Nelson Tang	3,542	6.3	+6.3
Labor	Anna Whitty	1,990	3.6	+3.6
Labor	Noor El-Asadi	1,476	2.6	+2.6
Fiona Carrick Independent	Fiona Carrick (elected 3)	6,691	12.0	+5.0
Fiona Carrick Independent	Marea Fatseas	341	0.6	+0.6
Fiona Carrick Independent	Bruce Paine	271	0.5	+0.5
Greens	Emma Davidson	2,967	5.3	−1.5
Greens	Sam Carter	840	1.5	+1.5
Greens	Harini Rangarajan	791	1.4	+1.4
Greens	Michael Brewer	605	1.1	+1.1
Independents for Canberra	Paula McGrady	792	1.4	+1.4
Independents for Canberra	Anne-Louise Dawes	624	1.1	+1.1
Independents for Canberra	Nathan Naicker	593	1.1	+1.1
Independents for Canberra	Robert Knight	375	0.7	+0.7
Independents for Canberra	Kathleen Bolt	356	0.6	+0.6
Family First	Andrew Copp	503	0.9	+0.9
Family First	Andy Verri	389	0.7	+0.7
Independent	Rima Diab	862	1.5	+1.5
Animal Justice	Gwenda Griffiths	389	0.7	+0.7
Animal Justice	Ashleigh Griffiths-Smith	353	0.6	+0.6
Total formal votes		55,849	98.4	−0.4
Informal votes		930	1.6	+0.4
Turnout		56,779	88.1	−2.7
Party total votes
Liberal		19,578	35.1	−0.5
Labor		18,529	33.2	−2.9
Fiona Carrick Independent		7,303	13.1	+13.1
Greens		5,203	9.3	−2.4
Independents for Canberra		2,740	4.9	+4.9
Family First		892	1.6	+1.6
Independent	Rima Diab	862	1.5	+1.5
Animal Justice		742	1.3	−0.7
Liberal hold		Swing	−2.1	
Liberal hold		Swing	+2.3	
Labor hold		Swing	−2.4	
Labor hold		Swing	+1.5	
Fiona Carrick Independent gain from Greens		Swing	+5.0	

==== 2020 ====
2020 Australian Capital Territory election: Murrumbidgee
Party	Candidate	Votes	%	±%
Quota		8,960		
Labor	Chris Steel (elected 2)	7,407	13.8	+4.6
Labor	Marisa Paterson (elected 4)	4,197	7.8	+7.8
Labor	Bec Cody	3,686	6.9	−1.9
Labor	Tim Dobson	2,264	4.2	+4.2
Labor	Brendan Long	1,828	3.4	−2.0
Liberal	Jeremy Hanson (elected 1)	8,209	15.3	−7.2
Liberal	Giulia Jones (elected 3)	3,535	6.6	−0.6
Liberal	Amardeep Singh	3,226	6.0	+6.0
Liberal	Ed Cocks	2,658	4.9	+4.9
Liberal	Sarah Suine	1,494	2.8	+2.8
Greens	Emma Davidson (elected 5)	3,677	6.8	+4.5
Greens	Tjanara Goreng Goreng	1,644	3.1	+3.1
Greens	Terry Baker	982	1.8	+1.8
Independent	Fiona Carrick	3,783	7.0	+7.0
Progressives	Robert Knight	837	1.6	+1.6
Progressives	Stephen Lin	614	1.1	+1.1
Animal Justice	Yana del Valle	613	1.1	+1.1
Animal Justice	Edmund Handby	464	0.9	+0.9
Sustainable Australia	Geoff Buckmaster	461	0.9	+0.9
Sustainable Australia	Jill Mail	374	0.7	+0.1
Shooters, Fishers, Farmers	Mark Gilmayer	422	0.8	+0.8
Shooters, Fishers, Farmers	Gordon Yeatman	339	0.6	+0.6
Climate Change Justice	Peter Veenstra	167	0.3	+0.3
Climate Change Justice	Jackson Hillman	146	0.3	+0.3
Climate Change Justice	Andrew Demetrios	133	0.2	+0.2
Climate Change Justice	Rohan Byrnes	121	0.2	+0.2
Climate Change Justice	Richard Forner	104	0.2	+0.2
Independent	Brendan Whyte	243	0.5	−0.1
Independent	Lee Perren-Leveridge	126	0.2	+0.2
Total formal votes		53,754	98.8	+1.2
Informal votes		641	1.2	−1.2
Turnout		54,395	90.8	+0.9
Party total votes
Labor		19,382	36.1	+1.6
Liberal		19,122	35.6	−7.2
Greens		6,303	11.7	+1.1
Independent	Fiona Carrick	3,783	7.0	+7.0
Progressives		1,451	2.7	+2.7
Animal Justice		1,077	2.0	−0.1
Sustainable Australia		835	1.6	+0.3
Shooters, Fishers, Farmers		761	1.4	+1.4
Climate Change Justice		671	1.2	+1.2
Independent	Brendan Whyte	243	0.5	−0.1
Independent	Lee Perren-Leveridge	126	0.2	+0.2
Labor hold		Swing	+4.6	
Labor hold		Swing	+7.8	
Liberal hold		Swing	–7.2	
Liberal hold		Swing	–0.6	
Greens hold		Swing	+4.5	

=== Elections in the 2010s ===
==== 2016 ====
2016 Australian Capital Territory election: Murrumbidgee
Party	Candidate	Votes	%	±%
Quota		8,343		
Liberal	Jeremy Hanson (elected 1)	11,224	22.4	+13.4
Liberal	Giulia Jones (elected 4)	3,594	7.2	+2.0
Liberal	Peter Hosking	3,530	7.1	+7.1
Liberal	Paul House	1,737	3.5	+3.5
Liberal	Jessica Adelan-Langford	1,340	2.7	+2.7
Labor	Chris Steel (elected 3)	4,574	9.1	+9.1
Labor	Bec Cody (elected 2)	4,373	8.7	+6.5
Labor	Jennifer Newman	3,260	6.5	+6.5
Labor	Brendan Long	2,680	5.4	+5.4
Labor	Mark Kulasingham	2,378	4.8	+2.9
Greens	Caroline Le Couteur (elected 5)	3,248	6.5	+4.0
Greens	Emma Davidson	1,171	2.3	+2.3
Greens	Jennifer Faerber	906	1.8	+1.8
Sex Party	Robbie Swan	1,746	3.5	+3.5
Animal Justice	Deborah Field	567	1.1	+1.1
Animal Justice	Jessica Montagne	504	1.0	+1.0
Liberal Democrats	Roman Gowor	215	0.4	+0.4
Liberal Democrats	Tom Hamer	166	0.3	+0.3
Liberal Democrats	Brendan Cumpston	153	0.3	+0.3
Liberal Democrats	Fergus Brown	141	0.3	+0.3
Liberal Democrats	Alexander Klinkon	138	0.3	+0.3
Like Canberra	Rod Vickers	338	0.7	+0.7
Like Canberra	Shelley Dickerson	320	0.6	+0.6
Sustainable Australia	Mark O'Connor	368	0.7	+0.7
Sustainable Australia	Jill Mail	284	0.6	+0.6
Community Alliance	Michael Lindfield	235	0.5	+0.5
Community Alliance	Nancy-Louise Scherger	178	0.4	+0.4
Independent	Margaret Webber	372	0.7	+0.7
Independent	Brendan Whyte	315	0.6	+0.6
Total formal votes		50,055	97.6	
Informal votes		1,235	2.4	
Turnout		51,290	89.9	
Party total votes
Liberal		21,425	42.8	+1.2
Labor		17,265	34.5	−5.2
Greens		5,325	10.6	−0.2
Sex Party	Robbie Swan	1,746	3.5	+3.5
Animal Justice		1,071	2.1	+2.1
Liberal Democrats		813	1.6	+1.6
Like Canberra		658	1.3	+1.3
Sustainable Australia		652	1.3	+1.3
Community Alliance		413	0.8	+0.8
Independent	Margaret Webber	372	0.7	+0.7
Independent	Brendan Whyte	315	0.6	+0.6
