= Members of the Australian Capital Territory Legislative Assembly, 2020–2024 =

10th Australian Capital Territory Legislative Assembly
←	9th	11th	→
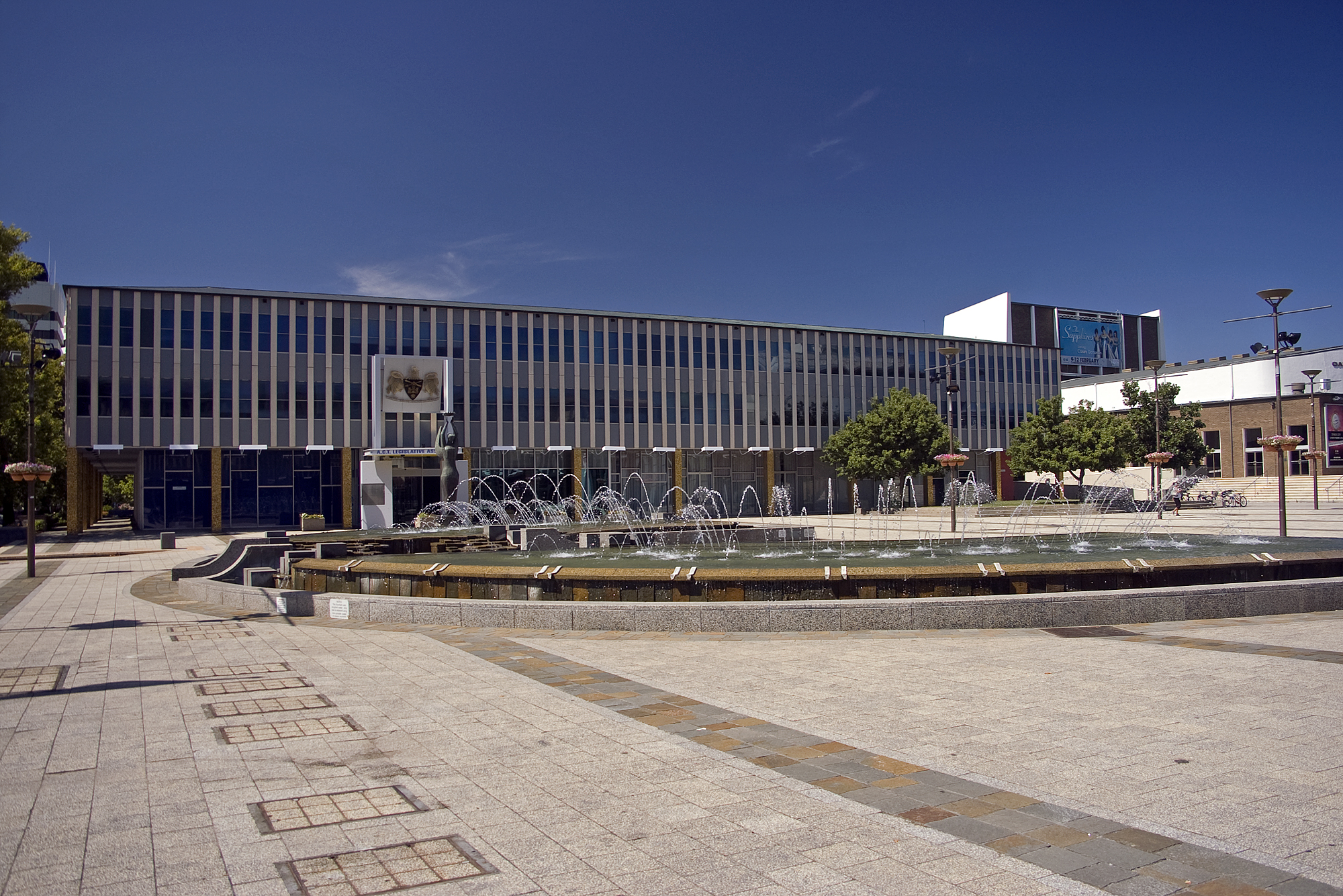

Overview
- Legislative body: Australian Capital Territory Legislative Assembly
- Jurisdiction: Australian Capital Territory, Australia
- Meeting place: Legislative Assembly Building
- Term: 17 October 2020 – 19 October 2024
- Election: October 2020
- Government: Labor
- Opposition: Canberra Liberals
- Website: www.parliament.act.gov.au/members/current

Australian Capital Territory Legislative Assembly
- Members: 25
- Speaker: Joy Burch, Labor since 31 October 2016
- Deputy Speaker: Mark Parton, Liberal since 3 November 2020
- Chief Minister: Andrew Barr, Labor since 11 December 2014
- Leader of the Opposition: Elizabeth Lee, Liberal since 27 October 2020
- Leader of the Greens: Shane Rattenbury, Greens since 20 October 2012
- Party control: Government (10): Labor (10); Opposition (8): Liberal (8); Crossbench (7): Greens (6); Family First (1)

Members of the Australian Capital Territory Legislative Assembly, 2020–2024

This is a list of members of the tenth Australian Capital Territory Legislative Assembly, as elected at and subsequent to the October 2020 election.

== Members ==
Name	Party	Electorate	Term in office
Andrew Barr	Labor	Kurrajong	2006–present
Yvette Berry	Labor	Ginninderra	2012–present
Andrew Braddock	Greens	Yerrabi	2020–present
Joy Burch	Labor	Brindabella	2008–2024
Peter Cain	Liberal	Ginninderra	2020–present
Leanne Castley	Liberal	Yerrabi	2020–present
Tara Cheyne	Labor	Ginninderra	2016–present
Jo Clay	Green	Ginninderra	2020–present
Ed Cocks^{[b]}	Liberal	Murrumbidgee	2022–present
Alistair Coe^{[a]}	Liberal	Yerrabi	2008–2021
Emma Davidson	Greens	Murrumbidgee	2020–2024
Johnathan Davis^{[c]}	Greens	Brindabella	2020–2023
Mick Gentleman	Labor	Brindabella	2004–2008, 2012–2024
Jeremy Hanson	Liberal	Murrumbidgee	2008–present
Giulia Jones^{[b]}	Liberal	Murrumbidgee	2012–2022
Elizabeth Kikkert^{[d]}	Liberal	Ginninderra	2016–2024
Elizabeth Kikkert^{[d]}	Independent	Ginninderra	2024
Elizabeth Kikkert^{[d]}	Family First	Ginninderra	2024
Nicole Lawder	Liberal	Brindabella	2013–2024
Elizabeth Lee	Liberal	Kurrajong	2016–present
James Milligan^{[a]}	Liberal	Yerrabi	2016–2020, 2021–present
Laura Nuttall^{[c]}	Greens	Brindabella	2023–present
Suzanne Orr	Labor	Yerrabi	2016–present
Mark Parton	Liberal	Brindabella	2016–present
Marisa Paterson	Labor	Murrumbidgee	2020–present
Michael Pettersson	Labor	Yerrabi	2016–present
Shane Rattenbury	Greens	Kurrajong	2008–present
Chris Steel	Labor	Murrumbidgee	2016–present
Rachel Stephen-Smith	Labor	Kurrajong	2016–present
Rebecca Vassarotti	Greens	Kurrajong	2020–2024

^{a} Yerrabi Liberal MLA Alistair Coe resigned from the Assembly on 12 March 2021. He was replaced via a countback of votes at the general election by James Milligan.
^{b} Murrumbidgee Liberal MLA Giulia Jones resigned from the Assembly on 2 June 2022. She was replaced via a countback of votes at the general election by Ed Cocks.
^{c} Brindabella Greens MLA Johnathan Davis resigned from the Assembly on 12 November 2023. He was replaced via a countback of votes at the general election by Laura Nuttall.
^{d} Ginninderra Liberal MLA Elizabeth Kikkert was expelled from the Liberal party room on 10 September 2024 after being disendorsed as a candidate for the 2024 election. She joined Family First Party on 24 September 2025.

== See also ==
- 2020 Australian Capital Territory election
