= Strathnairn (disambiguation) =

Strahnairn may refer to:

- Strathnairn, an area of the Scottish Highlands approximately 8 miles southwest of Inverness
- Strathnairn, Australian Capital Territory, a suburb in the Belconnen district of Canberra, Australia
- Strathnairn Homestead, Australian Capital Territory, a homestead in the Australian Capital Territory dates from the 1920s
