= Uriarra, New South Wales =

Uriarra
- Suburb
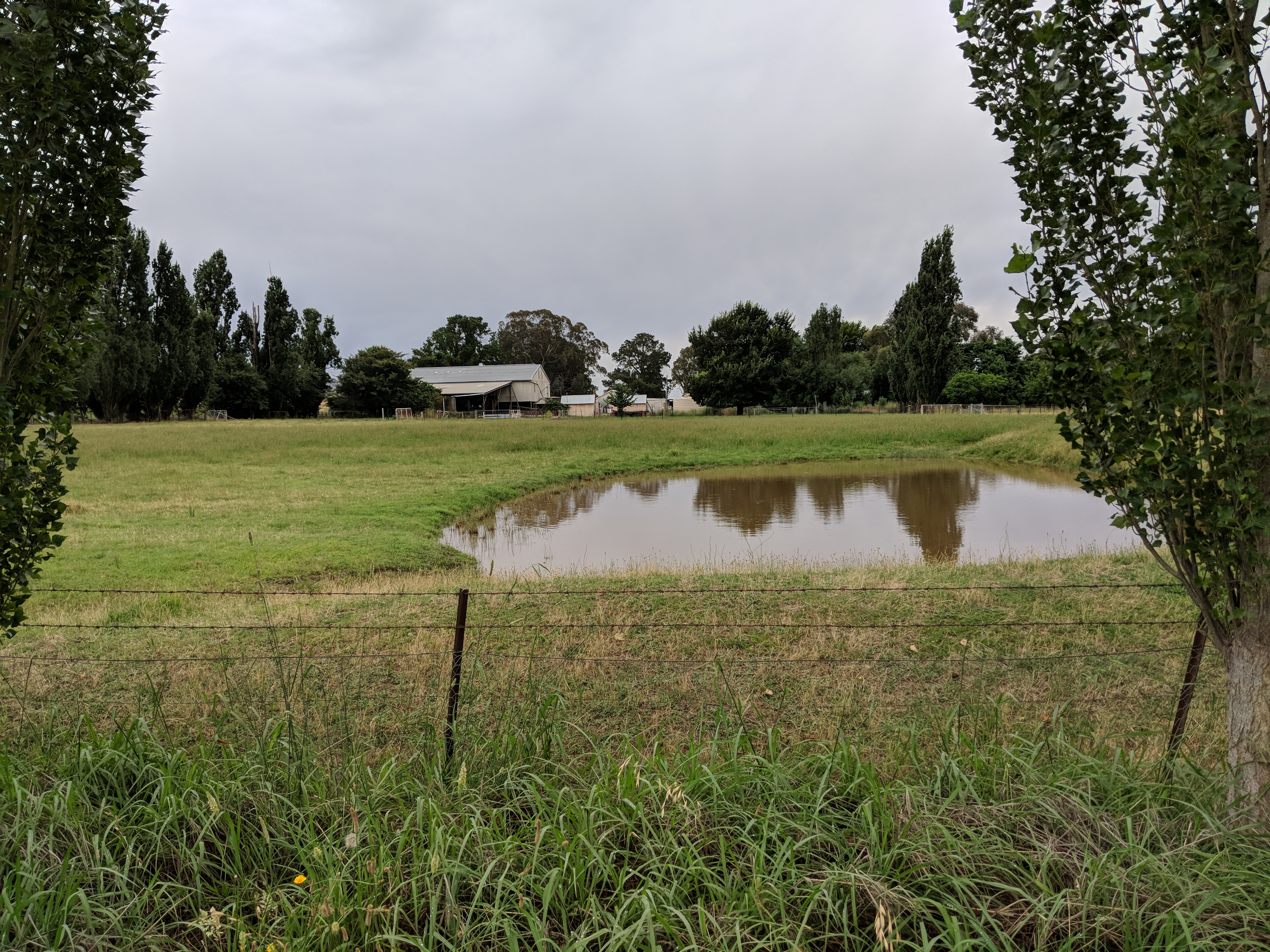

- Coordinates: 35°14′36″S 148°49′04″E
- Country: Australia
- State: New South Wales
- LGA: Yass Valley Council

Government
  - State electorate: Goulburn
  - Federal division: Riverina

Population
  - Total: 30 (2016 census)
- Postcode: 2611
- County: Cowley
- Parish: Urayarra; Pabral
Suburbs around Uriarra
Wee Jasper	Mullion	Wallaroo; Parkwood
Brindabella	Uriarra	Macnamara
Brindabella	Coree (district)	Coree (district)

Uriarra is a locality in the Southern Tablelands of New South Wales, Australia in the Yass Valley Shire. It is north of the locality of Uriarra in the Australian Capital Territory and north-west of Canberra. At the 2016 census, it had a population of 30. The locality is mostly located in the Urayarra parish of Cowley County, although part of it in Pabral parish, which lies further west.
