= Strathnairn, Australian Capital Territory =

Strathnairn
- Suburb
- Coordinates: 35°13′55″S 148°59′36″E
- Country: Australia
- State: Australian Capital Territory
- City: Canberra
- District: Belconnen
- Location: 16 km (9.9 mi) WNW of Canberra CBD; 32 km (20 mi) WNW of Queanbeyan; 103 km (64 mi) SW of Goulburn; 300 km (190 mi) SW of Sydney
- Established: 2016

Government
  - Territory electorate: Ginninderra
  - Federal division: Fenner
- Elevation: 558 m (1,831 ft)

Population
  - Total: 714 (SAL 2021)
Suburbs around Strathnairn
Macnamara	Macnamara	Holt
Coree (district)	Strathnairn	Holt
Belconnen (district)	Belconnen (district)	Belconnen (district)

Strathnairn (postcode: 2615) is a suburb in the Belconnen district of Canberra, located within the Australian Capital Territory, Australia. The suburb was gazetted in 2016 as part of the West Belconnen / Parkwood cross-border development near the Australian Capital Territory and New South Wales border.

Strathnairn is located west of the suburb Holt. Land releases were made available as a joint project titled Ginninderry by the ACT Government's Suburban Land Agency and Riverview Developments. The development includes housing, retail and community infrastructure. Strathnairn is designated as a cat containment suburb.

== Etymology ==
The origin of the suburb name is derived from the historical 1934 Strathnairn Homestead located in the suburb.

== History ==
Strathnairn is situated in the Ngunnawal traditional Aboriginal country. Aboriginal settlement of the Australian Capital Territory dates back over 20,000 years. Grinding grooves located on the Molonglo River to the south of Strathnairn provide evidence of Aboriginal use of the region pre-colonisation. Members of the 'Canberra Tribe' continued to camp in the vicinity until the 1860s. The United Ngunnawal Elders Council are a community partner in development of the suburb and have noted the continuing spiritual and cultural importance of the Strathnairn landscape to Canberra's Aboriginal community.

Strathnairn was part of the original grazing property established in 1837 by Captain Charles Sturt and sold to Charles Campbell of Duntroon in 1838. Campbell named the property 'Belconnen' and it became incorporated into the larger Duntroon estate. Campbell built the Belconnen homestead as an outstation of Duntroon in around the 1850s.

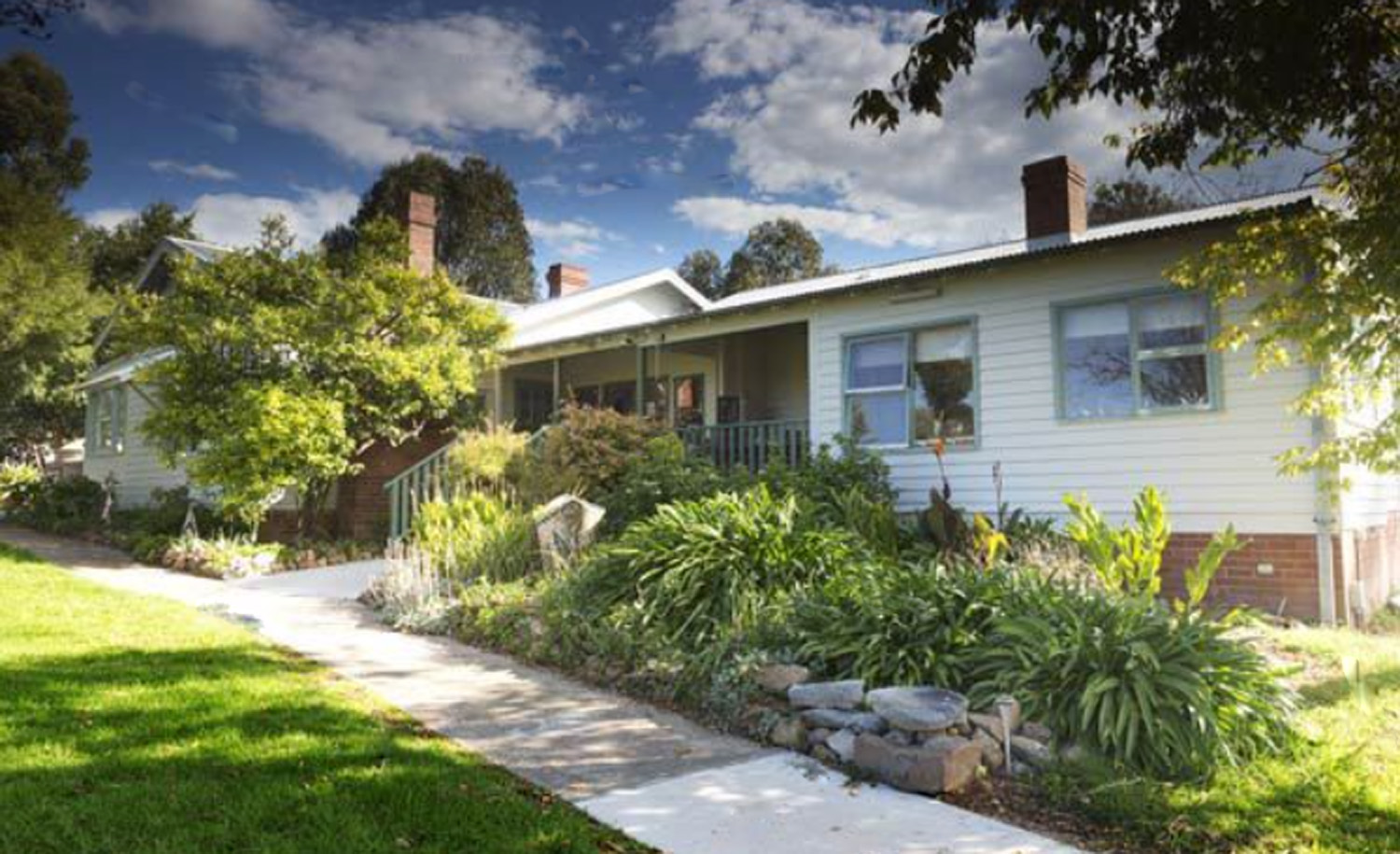
Strathnairn Homestead

The main access route between Queanbeyan, Tumut and the Kiandra goldfields from the 1830s-1880s was via a historic roadway running through Strathnairn to Cusack's Crossing on the Murrumbidgee.

The Belconnen property was partly resumed by the Commonwealth in 1913 for development of the Federal Capital Territory, and was subsequently broken in several smaller leases. Following the First World War, these were leased to returning soldier settlers. The property became known as Strathnairn in 1934 when it was first farmed by the Baird family, who constructed the Strathnairn homstead in the same year. The Baird family farmed the land until 1974. The homestead has been used as a community arts facility run by the Blue Folk Community Arts Association, and then the ACT Government, since 1977.
