= O'Malley, Australian Capital Territory =

O'Malley
- Suburb
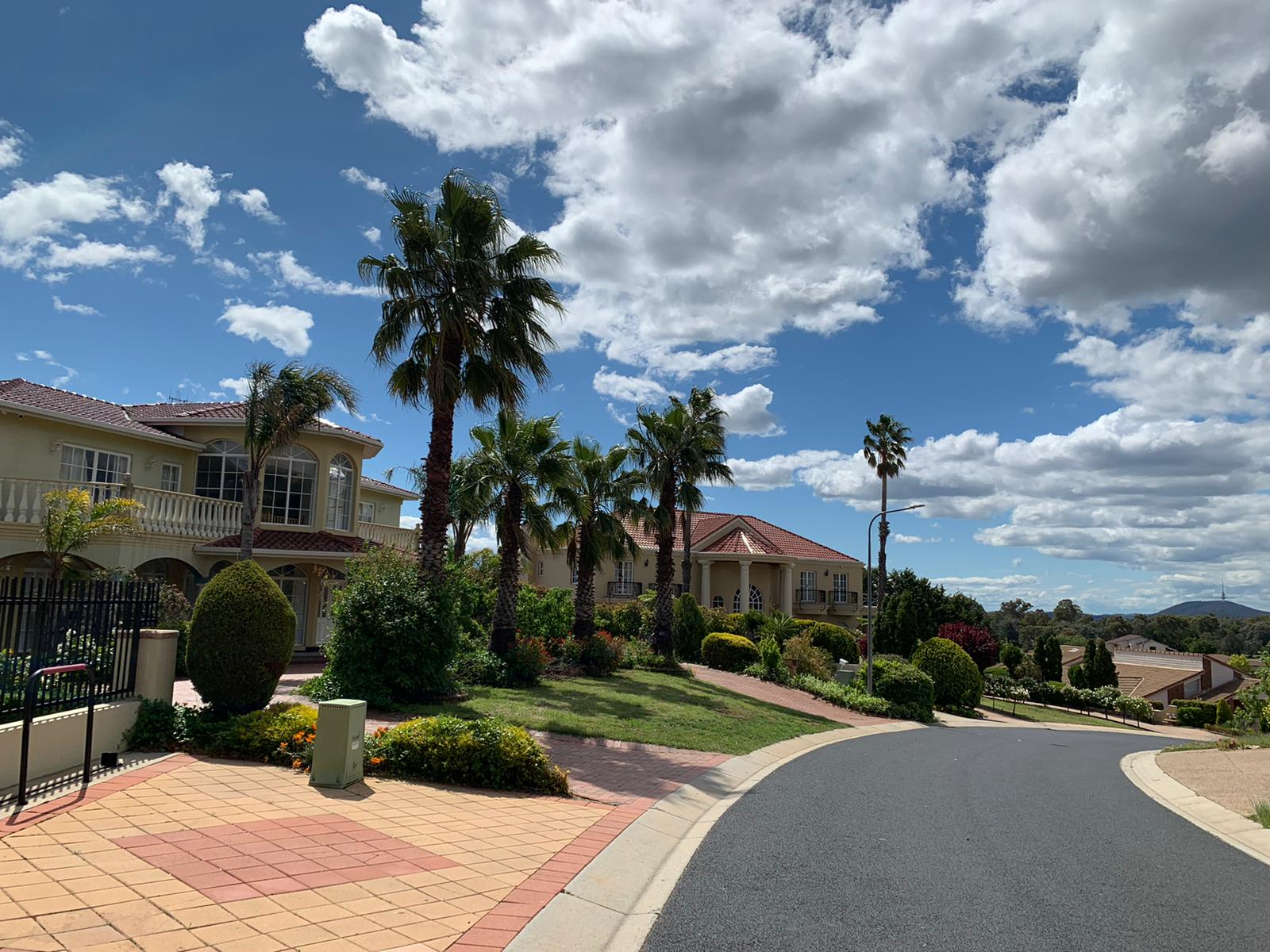

- Coordinates: 35°21′09″S 149°06′31″E
- Country: Australia
- State: Australian Capital Territory
- City: Canberra
- District: Woden Valley
- Location: 12 km (7.5 mi) S of Canberra CBD; 13 km (8.1 mi) W of Queanbeyan; 101 km (63 mi) SW of Goulburn; 298 km (185 mi) SW of Sydney
- Established: 1973

Government
  - Territory electorate: Murrumbidgee
  - Federal division: Bean

Area
  - Total: 2.6 km^{2} (1.0 sq mi)
- Elevation: 656 m (2,152 ft)

Population
  - Total: 928 (SAL 2021)
- Postcode: 2606
Suburbs around O'Malley
Phillip	Garran	Mount Mugga Mugga
Phillip	O'Malley	Canberra Nature Park
Mawson	Isaacs

O'Malley (/oʊmæli/) is a suburb of Canberra, Australian Capital Territory. At the 2021 census, O'Malley had a population of 928 people. There are numerous embassies in O'Malley. The suburb is named after King O'Malley, the Labor politician who arranged the competition for a design for Canberra in 1911. Streets in O'Malley are named with Aboriginal words.

== Population ==
In the 2021 Census, there were 928 people in O'Malley. 53.0% of people were born in Australia and 52.9% of people only spoke English at home. The most common responses for religion were No Religion (26.4%) and Catholic (24.8%).

== Restrictions ==
Wood fire heaters are banned in the newer East O'Malley area to due concerns of air quality in that valley

== Geology ==
Deakin Volcanics green-grey and purple rhyodacite are under the suburb. To the east in the valley bottom is Deakin Volcanics purple and green tuff and up the slopes of Mount Mugga Mugga are Deakin Volcanics coarse dark purple rhyodacite.

== Embassies ==
Embassies and High Commissions in O'Malley
Bangladesh	Chile	Croatia	Cuba	Czech Republic
Ecuador	Eritrea	Georgia	Iran	Iraq
Kuwait	Laos	Libya	Malta	Mongolia
Morocco	Pakistan	Palestine	Portugal	Romania
Samoa	Serbia	Slovakia	United Arab Emirates	Uganda
Venezuela	Vietnam	Zimbabwe		

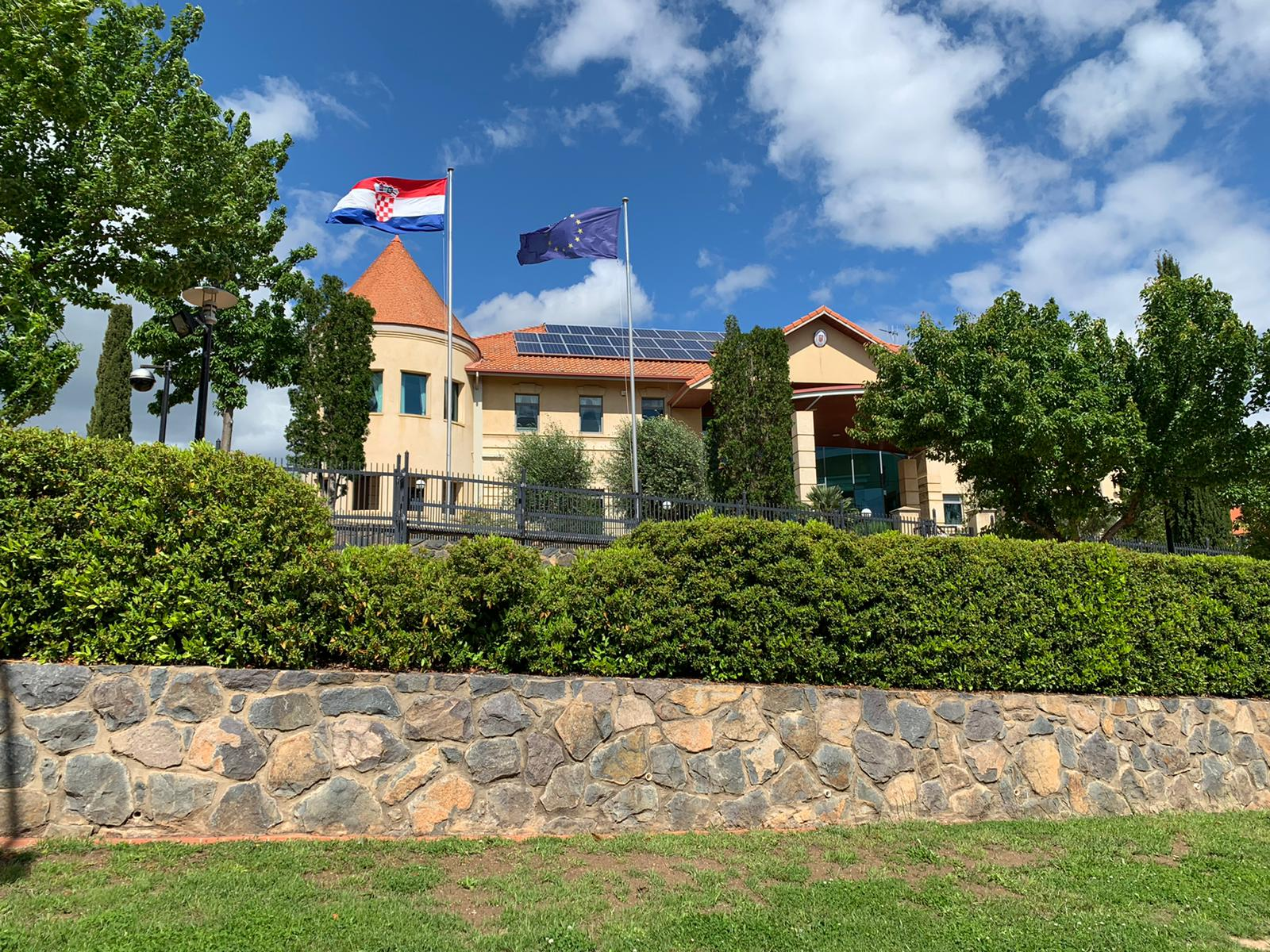
Embassy of Croatia in O'Malley

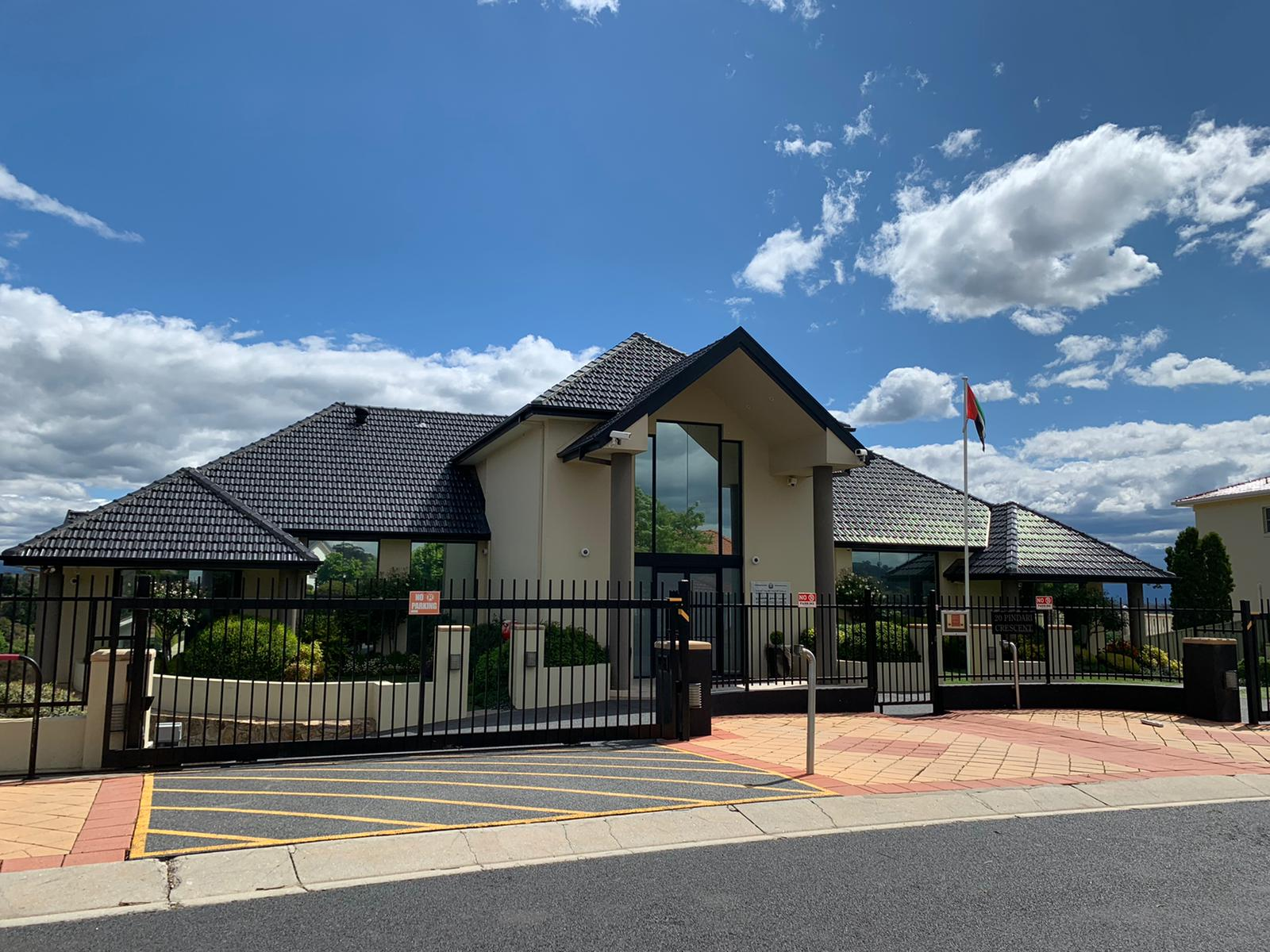
Military Attaché Office of the United Arab Emirates in O'Malley

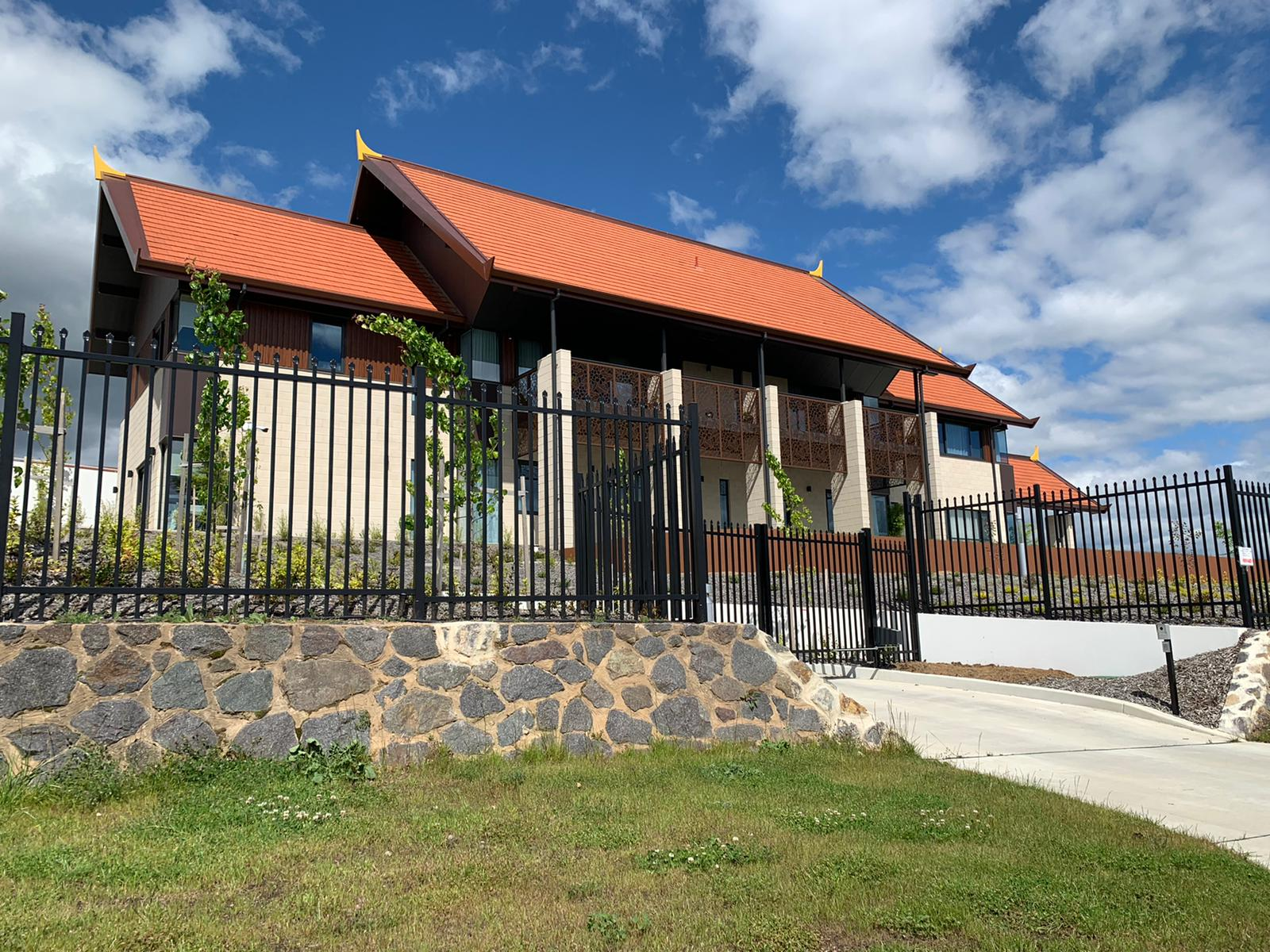
Embassy of Laos People's Democratic Republic in O'Malley
