= Macnamara, Australian Capital Territory =

Macnamara
- Suburb
- Coordinates: 35°12′51″S 148°58′58″E
- Country: Australia
- State: Australian Capital Territory
- City: Canberra
- District: Belconnen
- Location: 19 km (12 mi) WNW of Canberra CBD; 36 km (22 mi) WNW of Queanbeyan; 105 km (65 mi) SW of Goulburn; 302 km (188 mi) SW of Sydney
- Established: 2016

Government
  - Territory electorate: Ginninderra
  - Federal division: Fenner
- Elevation: 536 m (1,759 ft)

Population
  - Total: 0 (SAL 2021)
- Postcode: 2615
Suburbs around Macnamara
Parkwood (NSW)	Parkwood (NSW)	Belconnen (district)
Coree (district)	Macnamara	Belconnen (district)
Coree (district)	Strathnairn	Strathnairn

Macnamara (postcode: 2615) is a suburb in the Belconnen district of Canberra, located within the Australian Capital Territory, Australia. The suburb is part of the West Belconnen / Parkwood cross-border development near the Australian Capital Territory and New South Wales border.

== History ==
Macnamara is situated in the Ngunnawal traditional Aboriginal country. The origin of the suburb name is from Dame Jean Macnamara, an Australian medical doctor and scientist. Jean Macnamara was a highly regarded individual for her work at the Royal Children's Hospital in Parkville, Victoria, as well as her work in the development of polio vaccines. The suburb was gazetted in 2016.

== Development ==
The development of the suburb is a joint project titled Ginninderry by the Australian Capital Territory government and Riverview Developments. The development is to include housing, retail and community infrastructure. Macnamara has also been designated as a cat containment suburb by the ACT government.
