= Giulia Jones =

Australian politician

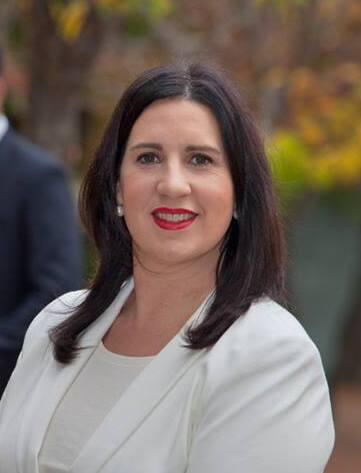

Member of the Australian Capital Territory Legislative Assembly for Murrumbidgee
- In office 20 October 2012 – 2 June 2022 Serving with Davidson, Steel, Hanson, Paterson
- Succeeded by: Ed Cocks

Personal details
- Born: 1980 (age 45–46) Hobart, Tasmania
- Party: Liberal Party
- Spouse: Bernard Jones
- Children: Six
- Education: University of Tasmania
- Occupation: Politician
- Cabinet: Deputy Leader of the Opposition
- Portfolio: Shadow Minister for Health, Mental Health and Well-being and Shadow Minister for Multicultural Affairs
- Website: http://www.giuliajones.com.au

Giulia Jones (born 1980) is an Australian politician. She was a member of the Australian Capital Territory Legislative Assembly representing the electorates of Molonglo and then Murrumbidgee for the Liberal Party from 2012 until her resignation in 2022. Jones was the deputy leader of the Liberal Party in the ACT from October 2020 to January 2022.

== Background ==
Jones was born in Hobart, Tasmania to a mother of Italian descent and from a Catholic family. Jones often notes that her first name Giulia is spelt with a "G". Jones studied political science and history and graduated with a Bachelor of Arts from the University of Tasmania. She married army officer Major Bernard Jones, and moved to Canberra in late 2005 after twelve months in Darwin. She ran a small business, worked in the public service, and as a political staffer for Sophie Mirabella and Tony Abbott. Jones is a mother of six children.

Prior to her election to the ACT Legislative Assembly, she had sought election on three occasions: pre-selection for a Tasmanian Senate seat in 2007; was a Liberal candidate for a Molonglo at the 2008 election; and at the 2010 federal election for the federal seat of Canberra. Following a 2018 reshuffling of the Liberal Party in the ACT's leadership, Jones was the Liberal spokeswoman for police and emergency services, corrections and women.

== Career ==
=== Union Organiser ===
Jones began her political career on the left of politics as a union organiser in Tasmania. This has led ACT Labor MLA, Chris Steel, to remark that "in another time or state, she could have found a home in Labor". In a speech in the ACT Legislative Assembly in 2017, Jones stated that she 'understands the value of unions'.

=== ACT Legislative Assembly ===
Jones was elected to the Legislative Assembly in 2012 representing the electorate of Molonglo. Since November 2012 she has held a large number of shadow ministries and served on several committees. With the redistribution of the ACT assembly seats she moved to the Murrumbidgee electorate.

On 24 May 2022, Jones announced she would resign from the Legislative Assembly in the next week. She formally resigned to the Speaker on 2 June, and Ed Cocks was elected in a countback on 20 June. Shortly after her resignation, Painaustralia announced that Jones had been appointed as their CEO.

=== 2024 Senate Preselection ===
On 8 April 2024, Jones publicly announced her preselection nomination to run on the Liberal Party's Senate ticket. Jones stated: "Canberrans deserve representation from the left and the right". Speaking on independent Senator David Pocock, who defeated sitting Liberal Senator Zed Seselja in 2022, Jones stated he is "a nice fellow". She says that a "positive person" like herself with a public profile could stand a chance against Pocock. The preselection was held on 28 April 2024. Jones lost in the first round of voting, receiving only 23 of the available 300 votes.

== Policy Positions ==
=== Pill Testing ===
In 2019, amongst debate on whether the Government should implement pill testing, The Canberra Times interviewed local ACT members to see if any ACT politicians have tried 'cannabis, MDMA [or] acid'. Jones said she had never done drugs, but had 'smoked a rolled up newspaper in high school'. "I had a pretty quiet upbringing I'd say," Jones said.

=== Territory Rights ===
Jones has been openly supportive of increasing territory rights for the Australian Capital Territory, noting that it is 'the natural progression for the ACT to have greater self-determination'. Speaking to The Canberra Times in reference to euthanasia, Jones stated that for many the two issues were linked, but she is "[not] here to tell people what to do". She continued: "I respect the voters of the ACT and their rights and their desire for greater rights, because that's natural and normal". Whilst Deputy Leader of the Canberra Liberals in 2021, Jones was part of the party room decision to support territory rights. The decision resulted in a rare tripartisan motion from Labor, the Greens and the Canberra Liberals calling on the federal government to restore rights to the territory. Upon resigning from the ACT Legislative Assembly in early 2022, Jones used her final speech to call for more territory rights for the ACT. Ultimately, the Restoring Territory Rights Act came into effect in December 2022.

== Controversy ==
In a 2013 Canberra Times article, Jones commented that the ACT Labor Government was failing constituents in regards to local car park management.

In 2020, Jones had her driver's license suspended for three months for various speeding offences while she was serving in the ACT Legislative Assembly as the Liberal opposition's spokeswoman for police and emergency services. Shane Rattenbury, the Capital Territory's Road Safety Minister, responded by saying Jones had a "blatant disregard for road safety" and called for her resignation. Jones subsequently stated: "After three months of getting around on my bicycle, it's given me some additional perspective and I'm looking forward to starting a-fresh".

== See also ==
- 2012 Australian Capital Territory election
- Members of the Australian Capital Territory Legislative Assembly, 2012–2016

Australian Capital Territory Legislative Assembly
Preceded by Zed Seselja	Member of the Legislative Assembly for Molonglo; 2012–2016; Served alongside: Hanson, Doszpot, Corbell, Barr, Gallagher, Rattenbury, Fitzharris	Succeeded by Electorate abolished
Australian Capital Territory Legislative Assembly
Preceded by Caroline Le Couteur	Member of the Legislative Assembly for Murrumbidgee; 2016–2022; Served alongside: Davidson, Steel, Hanson, Paterson	Succeeded by Ed Cocks
