= Wallaroo, New South Wales =

Wallaroo New South Wales
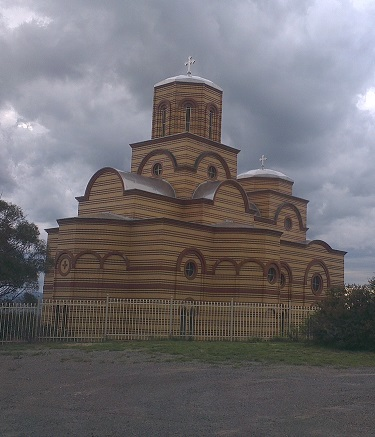
- Church of St Sava at the New Kalenich Monastery, Wallaroo

- Coordinates: 35°08′08″S 149°00′38″E
- Population: 576 (2021 census)
- Postcode(s): 2618
- Elevation: 598 m (1,962 ft)
- Location: 19 km (12 mi) NW of Canberra; 295 km (183 mi) SW of Sydney; 47 km (29 mi) S of Yass
- LGA(s): Yass Valley Shire
- County: Murray
- Parish: Wallaroo
- State electorate(s): Goulburn
- Federal division(s): Riverina
Localities around Wallaroo:
Cavan	Jeir	Springrange
Mullion	Wallaroo	Hall
Uriarra	Parkwood	Belconnen (district)

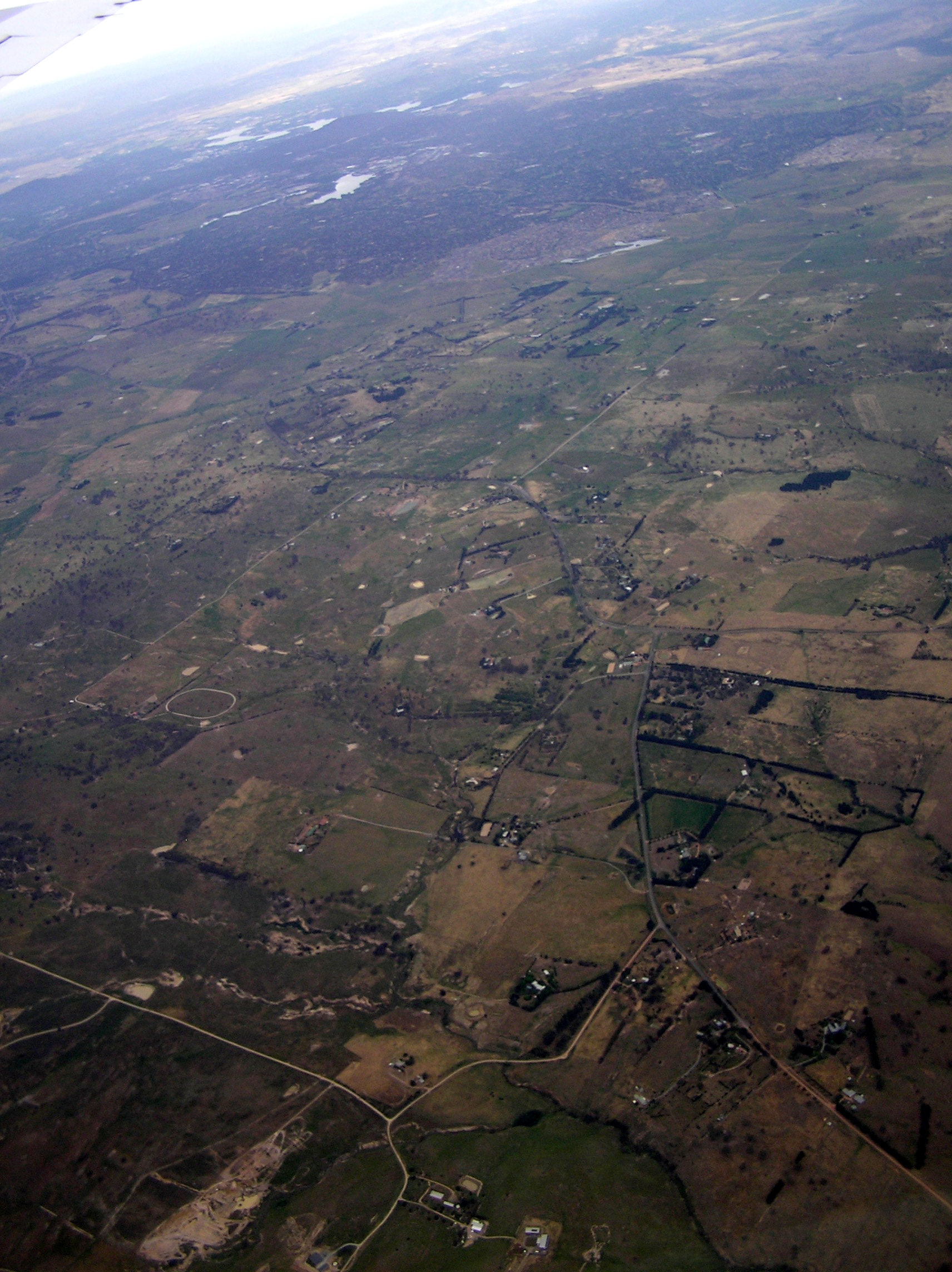
Aerial view of Wallaroo, from north west with Canberra in the background

Wallaroo is a rural locality in New South Wales close to the Australian Capital Territory. It lies north of the Australian Capital Territory border, north west of Hall, west of the Barton Highway, and east of the Murrumbidgee River. It is approximately 19 kilometres north-west of the Australian city of Canberra. At the 2021 census, it had a population of 576.

The cadastral unit in the area is known as Wallaroo Parish. Between 1981–1990, the Serbian Orthodox Church constructed the St. Sava monastery at Wallaroo. Established as the headquarters of the Serbian Orthodox Eparchy of Australia and New Zealand, the church is modeled on the Kalenić monastery in Serbia, built in the 15th century.
