= Uriarra Village, Australian Capital Territory =

Uriarra Village
- Coordinates: 35°17′43″S 148°55′31″E
- Country: Australia
- State: Australian Capital Territory
- District: Coree
- Location: 30 km (19 mi) W of Canberra
- Established: 2012

Government
  - Territory electorate: Murrumbidgee
  - Federal division: Bean

Population
  - Total: 309 (SAL 2021)
- Postcode: 2611
Localities around Uriarra Village
Canberra Nature Park	Canberra Nature Park	Canberra Nature Park
Canberra Nature Park	Uriarra Village	Canberra Nature Park
Canberra Nature Park	Canberra Nature Park	Canberra Nature Park

Uriarra Village is a town in the district of Coree, in the Australian Capital Territory in Australia. It is situated on the western side of the Australian Capital Territory, about 30 minutes from Canberra, established in 1928 at the foothills of the Australian Alps. A nearby area to the north of the border in New South Wales is also called Uriarra.

The settlement and surrounding forest were significantly damaged by the 2003 Canberra bushfires with 16 of the original 23 homes being destroyed. In May 2004 the ACT Government considered information on social capital, infrastructure innovation, environmental, planning and financial analysis and found that Uriarra Village should be redeveloped in a sustainable manner. Fifteen of the original families moved away from the settlement with nine choosing to remain.

In 2007 the ACT Government commenced rebuilding the settlement as a rural settlement, by funding new roads and infrastructure. In mid-2012 the settlement was officially recognised and named as a village within the ACT.

Uriarra Village is the only "community title" village in Australia. The village community independently owns and maintains village services and infrastructure including roads, community lands, the village hall, and stormwater. As such the village receives only minimal services from the ACT Government for the provision of garbage collection. The National Capital Authority advocated a community title for the village after the 2003 bushfire to "promote social interaction and a shared community spirit".

== Location ==
Uriarra Village is about 16 km west of Canberra, and about 4 km north of the Cotter Reserve, amidst rolling hilly lands overlooking a broad creek valley.

The village is located in rural ACT off Brindabella Road that connects Canberra to Brindabella and Tumut via the Brindabella Ranges. The village sits at the foothills of the Australian Alps and to the South has views to Mount Ginini, Mount Franklin and the highest mountain in the ACT, Bimberi Peak. To the north, the village faces grasslands leading towards the Molonglo River. The village "lies on the boundary between remnant Yellow box/ Red gum grassy woodland and the Uriarra and Pierces Creek pine plantations".

To the east lies Mount McDonald providing panoramic 360° views across Canberra, the Australian Alps, and rural farmlands.

1 kilometre (0.62 mi) to the west lies the historic Uriarra Homestead where Mountain Creek Road (to Yass and Wee Jasper) joins Brindabella Road (to Tumut).

Uriarra Forest to the south was destroyed in the 2003 bushfire.

== Bushfires ==
Due to Uriarra's bushfire history and rural location the Government of the Australian Capital Territory placed stringent development requirements on new buildings within the village. Each house has mandatory rainwater storage, sewerage treatment, and firefighting systems. The village has pressurised non-potable water for fire fighting purposes fed from the Bendora Gravity Main (which connects Bendora Dam with Mount Stromlo Water Treatment Plant).

Due to the remote nature of the village, bushfire assistance is limited. The Lease and Development conditions for the Village highlight that "emergency response times will be longer than normal". The village maintains a 300-metre fire abatement zone to the West, East, and South, which is also used for horse agistment. There is no fire abatement zone to the North of the village.

In 2001 fires originating in Uriarra threatened the suburbs of Duffy, Holder, Weston, Yarralumla and Curtin and burnt to the shores of Lake Burley Griffin destroying 510 hectares of pine plantation. In 2003 the Canberra bushfires devastated the village destroying 16 of the original 23 homes. The village was again threatened by grass fires in 2013 when a four-hectare grass fire threatened the south of the village.

== Abandoned Solar Farm Proposal ==
On 19 August 2013 the Government of the Australian Capital Territory announced Elementus Energy had been awarded solar Feed in Tariff (FiT) rights based on a proposal to build a 7 megawatt Solar Farm less than 150 metres away from houses in Uriarra Village. The proposal includes 26100 solar panels located in grasslands opposite the village on the northern side. The proposal was met with opposition from residents of the village with multiple letters published in local media opposing the solar farm.

On 18 September 2013 a protest against the development was staged at the ACT Legislative Assembly. The protest was followed by a defeated motion in the Assembly to remove Minister Corbell's power to overrule the planning decision. The opposition at the time (the Canberra Liberals) did not support the proposed location opposite Uriarra Village. Following the dispute the ACT Chief Minister, Katy Gallagher, indicated that for future solar farm proposals Government of the Australian Capital Territory would explore developing best practice guidelines regarding site selection.

The Uriarra location for the solar farm was abandoned in March 2015. A new site for the solar farm was secured beside the Monaro Highway at Williamsdale in the ACT and the project was taken over and developed by the Impact Investment Group in 2016.

== Heritage ==
The original Uriarra Forestry Camp was established in 1913–1915 on the Brindabella Road, about three kilometres from the site of the current Uriarra settlement. The camp was established for forestry workers who cleared the existing eucalypt trees and established radiata pine plantations which formed the origins of the ACT plantation forest industry.

In 1928 the Uriarra Forestry Settlement was established in its current location, in recognition of the need to permanently house the forestry workers on site, reflecting their dual role as forestry workers and also as fire surveillance officers. The census for that year showed 30 people living at the Uriarra Settlement.

The village maintains multiple heritage citations including over the historically significant school. Established in 1897 when it was conducted in the local Church of England church, it operated for ten years as a Half Time school with Ledgerton, ten miles further north. This school was located beside the road from Queanbeyan to Urriarra, which crossed the Murrumbidgee River at Uriarra Crossing. After two periods operating as a Subsidised School (1907–10 and 1920-1926), a 'new' Uriarra school opened at the Uriarra Forestry Settlement in 1936 and operated there until 2001.

== Uriarra Crossing ==
Uriarra Crossing is a low level bridge over the Murrumbidgee River on Uriarra Road to the north, providing an alternative route to Molonglo Valley and the rest of Canberra.

A punt operated the crossing from around 1860. A bridge was constructed and officially opened on 5 October 1901. That bridge was swept away in the floods of 1922, and for a time was not to be rebuilt due to the proximity of the Cotter Bridge. A new bridge was eventually reconstructed, and opened for traffic on 28 March 1936.

== Geology ==
Rocks from the Uriarra area are from the Silurian period. Uriarra Volcanics appear northwest of the Winslade fault. It consists of dacite lava flows and pyroclastic deposits of tuff. A fine ashstone bed called Tarpaulin Creek Ashstone Member outcrops in a distorted north-south line acts as a marker. Tuff and flows above and below the ashstone member contain obvious pink feldspar crystals. The tuff shows bedding, and the flows have a banded flow structure. The Cotter Porphyry to the north of the Cotter Dam is actually a dacite flow. There is a limestone lens north of Uriarra Crossing. The outcrop goes from Mountain Creek Road in the west to the Murrumbidgee River in the east. It extends a few kilometres to the north of the ACT border and south to the Winslade Fault near the Cotter River. A wedge of limestone extends to the south southwest including Pierces Creek.
