= Old Canberra Inn =

Hotel in the Australian Capital Territory

Coordinates: 35.244°S 149.127°E

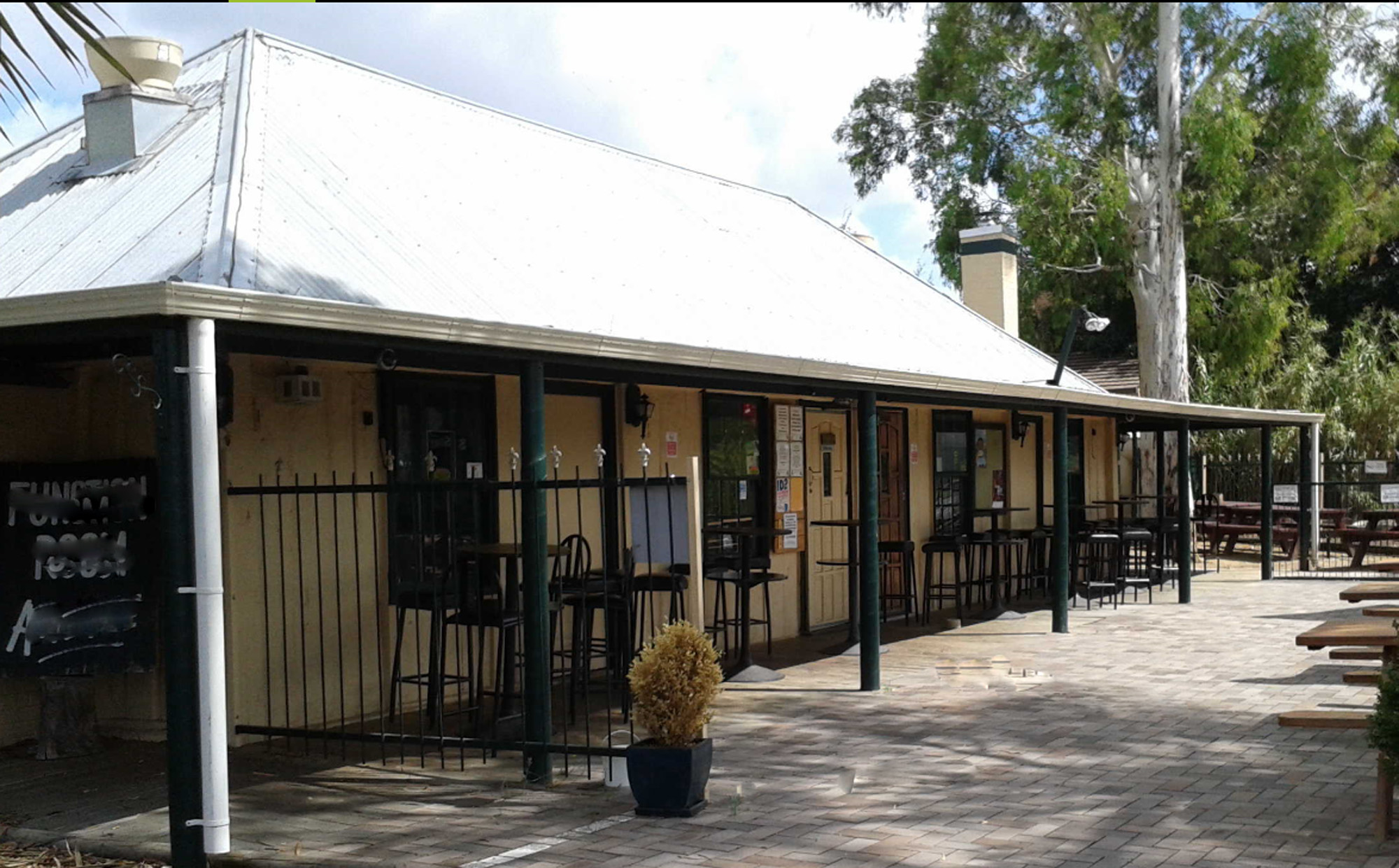
Old Canberra Inn

The Old Canberra Inn is one of the earliest licensed pubs in the Canberra region, Australia. The building pre-dates the city itself. It is located in the present-day suburb of Lyneham.

The original slab hut was built in 1857 by Joseph Schumack and in 1876 it was licensed as an inn. It was a coach stop on the Yass to Queanbeyan run until 1887 when it was sold to John Read. It became the Read family home until 1974, called The Pines until it was renovated and relicensed as the Old Canberra Inn.

The Old Canberra Inn is well known for its craft beers, with their 10 beer taps exclusively serving Australian independent craft beer.

== The Shumack family ==
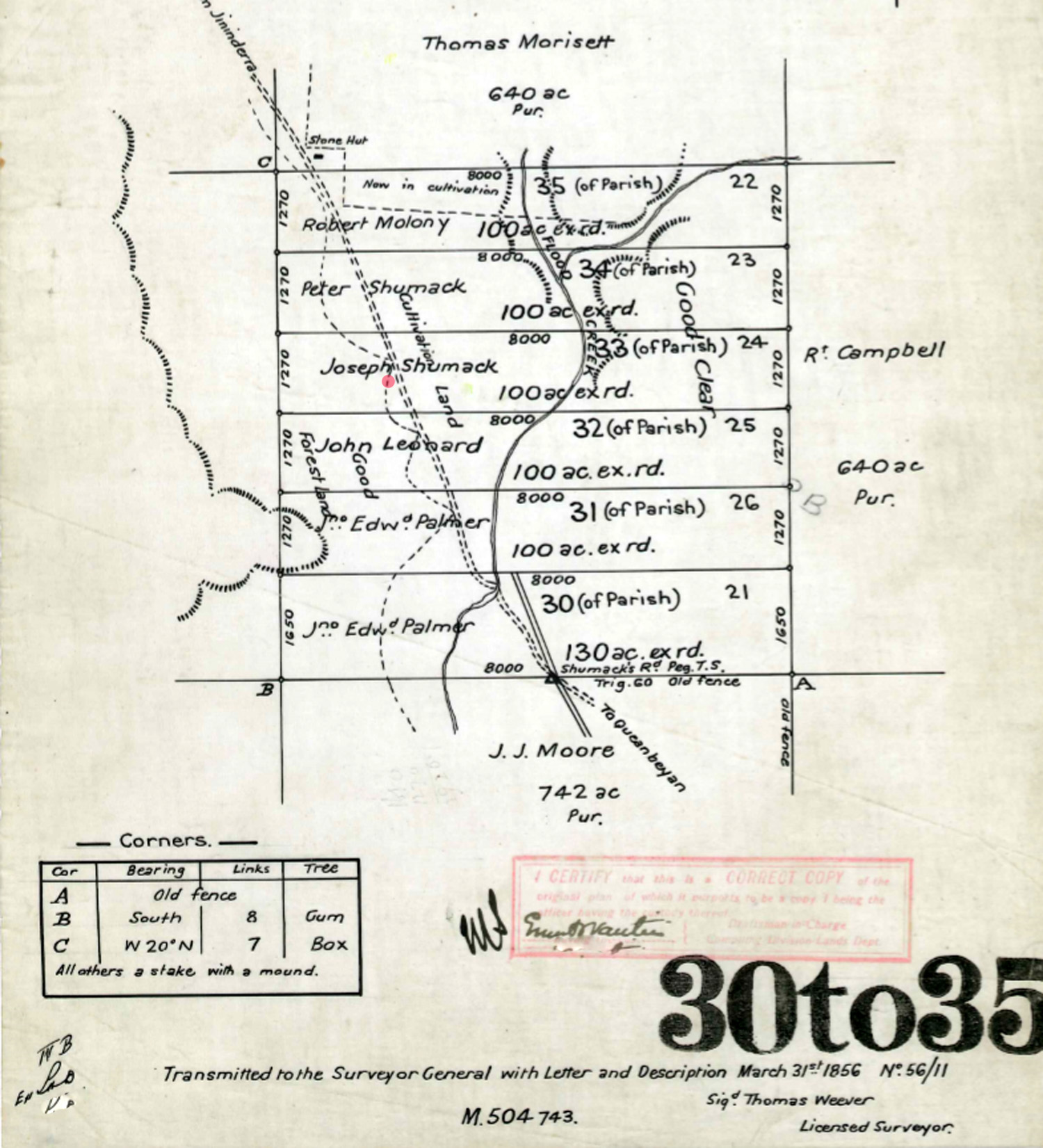
Map of lots in Canberra 1856 showing location of the Old Canberra Inn (red dot)

Joseph Shumack (1836–1901) built the "Old Canberra Inn" in 1857. He was born in Ireland in 1836 and migrated to Australia in 1841 at the age of 5 with his parents John Schmack (1812-1849) and Margaret O’Toole. They were part of the Shumack family who are credited with making substantial contributions to the development of Canberra. The most famous member of this family was Samuel Shumack who was Joseph's cousin.

In 1842, Joseph's father acquired Glebe Farm which was on the western boundary of Duntroon with a frontage to the Molonglo River. He lived here with his family until 1849 when he died suddenly leaving his wife Margaret to care for four young children the oldest of whom was Joseph who was 13 at that time. They continued farming the land and then in 1854 his mother married Edward Woods who was also a widower.

In 1856, Joseph was granted his own 100 acre lot at the site of the "Old Canberra Inn". A map is shown illustrating its location. He built a house and began farming. He seems to have acquired one of the other adjacent 100 acre lots as in 1877 a traveller described the property in the following terms.

"Four miles further on the road is the Canberra Inn belonging to Mr J. Shumack who also has 200 acres around the hotel. Fifty acres are under cultivation with wheat and oats. Considering the season the wheat will turn out well. The oat crop is light and short in straw."

In 1865, Joseph married Bridget Mary Ward (1836-1914) who came from County Cork, Ireland. The couple had four children.

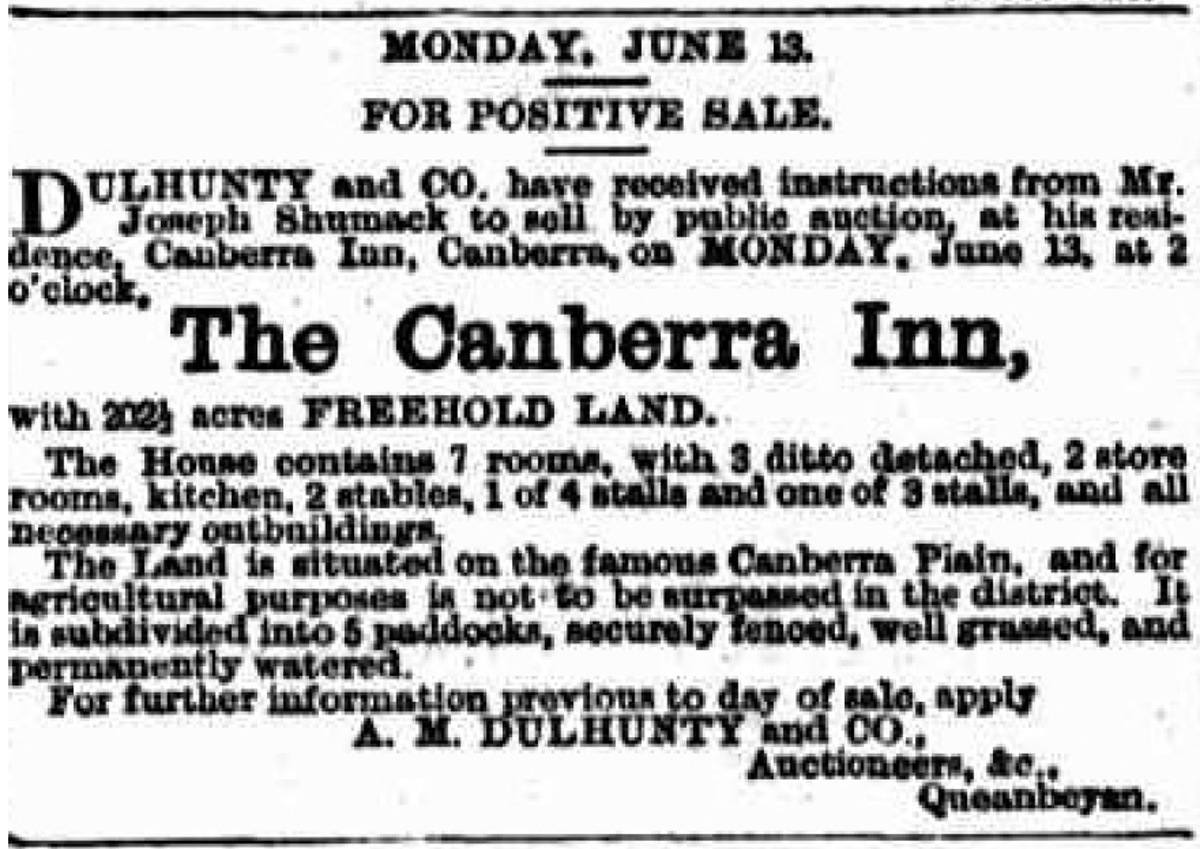
Advertisement for the sale of the Canberra Inn in 1887

From the late 1850s many new coach services started running through Yass and Ginninderra through to Queanbeyan and Braidwood. As the map shows Joseph's house was ideally positioned next to the Yass to Queanbeyan Road so in 1876 he decided to take advantage of his location and converted his residence to the "Canberra Inn" and obtained a liquor licence. The Inn became a regular stop for the Yass/ Queanbeyan mail coach and the coaches en route to the Araluen Goldfields.

In 1887, he decided to sell his property and advertised it in the newspapers. The advertisement is shown. At this time, the Old Canberra Inn was described in the following terms.

"With 202 acres of freehold land. The house contains 7 rooms with 3 rooms detached, 2 storerooms, kitchen, 2 stables – one of four stalls and one of three stalls and all necessary outbuildings.

The land is situated on the famous Canberra Plain and for agricultural purposes is not to be surpassed in the district. It is subdivided into 5 paddocks, securely fenced, well grassed and permanently watered"

The house was bought by Joseph's nephew John Read.

== The Read family ==
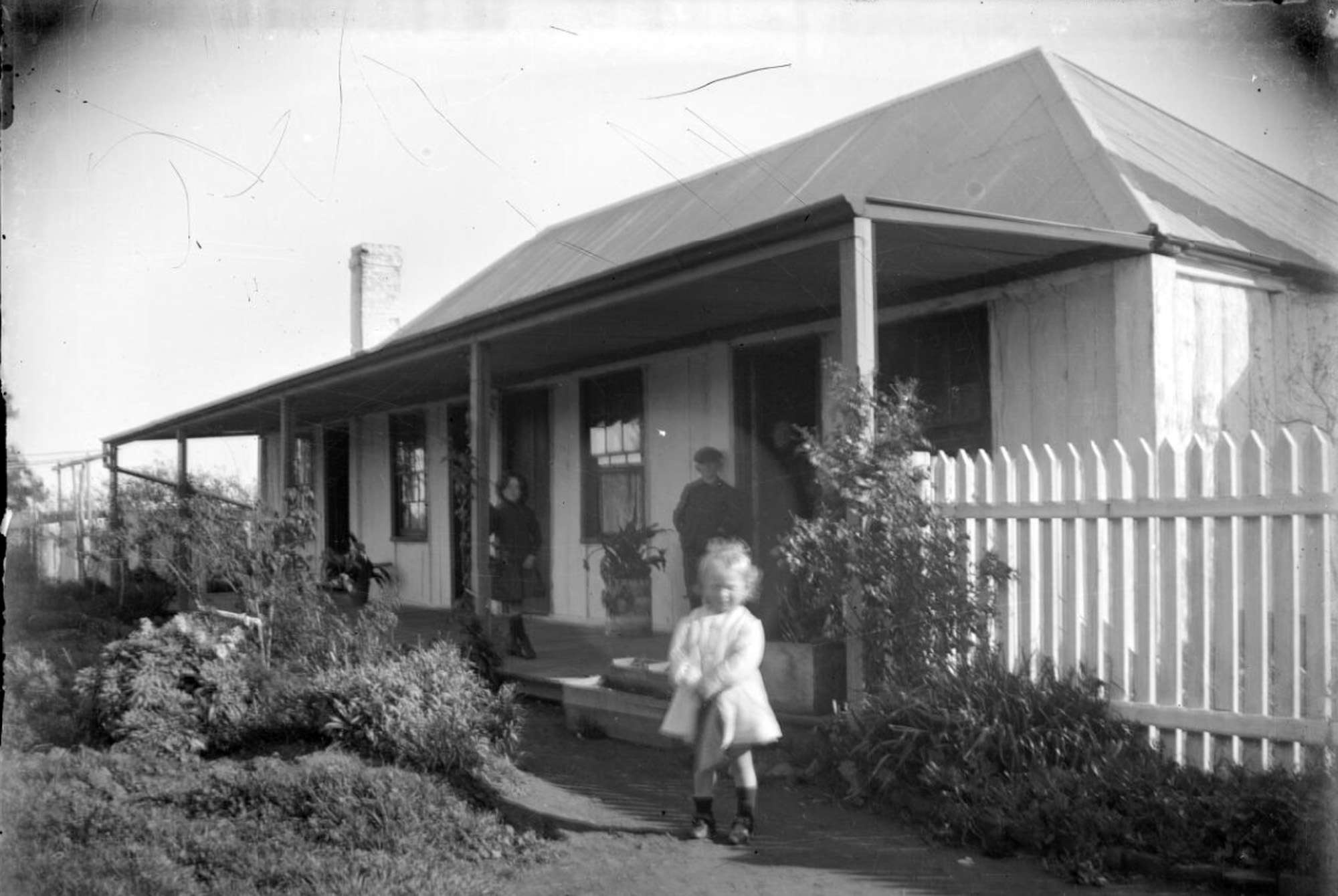
Old Canberra Inn, then called "The Pines" in 1910. From left to right are Eileen Jack and Harry Read

John Read (1868–1917) who bought the Old Canberra Inn in 1887 converted it back to a residence and called it "The Pines". The Read family lived there for almost ninety years. John Read was born in 1868 in Canberra. His father was Hugh Read (1838-1894) who arrived in Australia in 1856 at the age of 18. Hugh worked for Joseph Shumack and in 1862 he married Joseph's sister Eliza Shumack. The couple had ten children and settled on a property called "Wattle Grove" at Sutton.

In 1895, eight years after he bought the Canberra Inn, John Read married Ellen Maloney (1871–1962). She was the daughter of Robert Maloney, who owned one of the 100-acre lots shown in the map above that was almost adjacent to the Old Canberra Inn.

The couple had six children. Three of them are shown in the photo of 1910 standing outside their home "the Pines" formerly the Canberra Inn. They are Eileen, Jack and Harry. The Read family continued to operate the property as a farm as in 1898 John won a prize at the Agricultural show for his oat crop. John was a noted sheep and wheat farmer in the district.

John died in 1917 and Ellen his wife continued to live at "The Pines". The electoral rolls show that she lived at the house for the rest of her life. She died in 1962 at the age of 90. Her sons Robert and Thomas lived with her during that time, and they jointly owned the property and farmed it together. Three of her other four children settled in the Canberra district. The Ellen Read collection 55 glass negative photographic slides are held in the collection of the National Library of Australia. Ellen was one of the first female photographers of the district. Jack Read who is shown in the above photo built Strathnairn Homestead in 1924. He later owned the Royal Hotel in Braidwood.

After Ellen died in 1962 her two sons Robert and Thomas continued to farm "The Pines". Robert died in 1966 and Thomas died in 1973. In 1974 it was bought by the Government who decided to restore it and convert it to an inn.

== See also ==
- List of oldest companies in Australia
