= Bec Cody =

Australian politician

Member of the Australian Capital Territory Legislative Assembly for Murrumbidgee
- In office 15 October 2016 – 17 October 2020

Personal details
- Born: 1973 (age 52–53)
- Party: Labor Party

Rebecca "Bec" Cody (born 1973) is an Australian politician. She was a Labor member of the Australian Capital Territory Legislative Assembly from 2016 to 2020, representing the electorate of Murrumbidgee. She was a hairdresser before entering politics, and owned a salon. She also worked as a unionist. Prior to her election in 2016, Cody unsuccessfully ran in the ACT electorate of Brindabella in 2012, securing 5.6% of the first preference vote.

Cody played a key role in the ACT Legislative Assembly in smearing the name of a former governor-general, in moving to have his honour erased from the name of a road in Canberra in November 2018.

She lost her seat to fellow Labor candidate Marisa Paterson at the 2020 ACT election.
