= Parkwood, New South Wales =

Parkwood
- Suburb
- Coordinates: 35°12′14″S 148°58′45″E
- Country: Australia
- State: New South Wales
- LGA: Yass Valley Council
- Established: 2020

Government
  - State electorate: Goulburn
  - Federal division: Riverina
- Postcode: 2618
Suburbs around Parkwood
Mullion	Wallaroo	Wallaroo
Uriarra	Parkwood	Belconnen (district) (ACT)
Uriarra	Macnamara (ACT)	Macnamara (ACT)

Parkwood is a proposed future suburb of Yass Valley Council in New South Wales, Australia.

The site is part of the West Belconnen / Parkwood cross-border development near the Australian Capital Territory and New South Wales border.

== History ==
Parkwood is situated in the Ngunnawal traditional Aboriginal country. The origin of the name Parkwood is from the name given to a property by an early settler by the name of Thomas Southwell in 1854 near the confluence of Ginninderra Creek and Murrumbidgee River. In 1910, the Seat of Government (Administration) legislation enacted all property within the ACT being designated as Crown land, and ACT properties then became leasehold rather than freehold. The section of land in NSW north of the border (now known as Parkwood) remains freehold.

Parkwood was approved, rezoned and designated as a suburb by Yass Valley Council in 2020. The Parkwood Planning Proposal was approved by the NSW Government in 2020. The NSW Government, ACT Government and Yass Valley Council had signed a memorandum of understanding (MoU) that ensured the new residential areas would be supported by services and infrastructure on a cross-border agreement basis. Local environmental planning provisions for land in Parkwood, including zoning of lands, were made in 2020.

== Development ==
The development, situated nearby the Murrumbidgee River and Ginninderra Creek includes investment into green infrastructure, public spaces and community facilities, with land usage designated for urban development and conservation purposes. The proposed construction phase had been anticipated to provide more than 3,800 employment positions. The project would consist of 5000 dwellings and house 13,000 residents. The Parkwood Urban Release development was designated as one of 19 projects included in the NSW Government's Planning System Acceleration Program that expedited planning assessments to retain people in jobs and to sustain the economy during the COVID-19 circumstances.
