= Strathnairn Homestead, Australian Capital Territory =

Historic building in Strathnairn, Australia

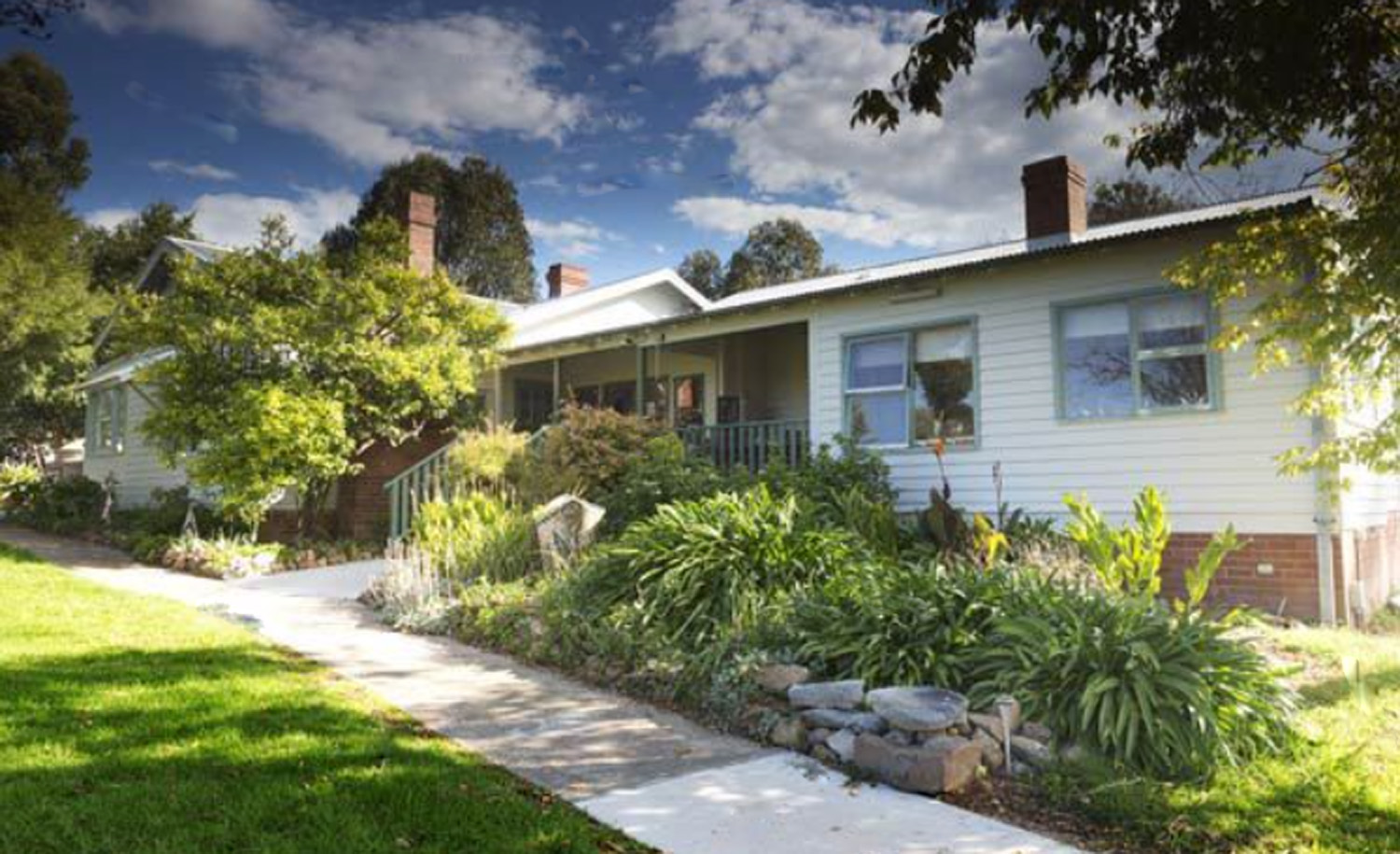
Strathnairn Homestead

Strathnairn Homestead in Strathnairn, Australian Capital Territory dates from the 1920s. It was acquired by the Baird family in 1934 who made major additions to the original house. The land was originally part of a grant awarded to explorer Captain Charles Sturt in 1838. The Baird family ran Strathnairn as a sheep and cattle property from 1934 until 1974 when it was resumed by the Commonwealth Government. It was first leased for community arts activities in 1977. Strathnairn Arts Centre continues to provide working spaces and facilities for artists, crafts people and community groups. It also has a café, shop and art gallery.

== Early owners ==
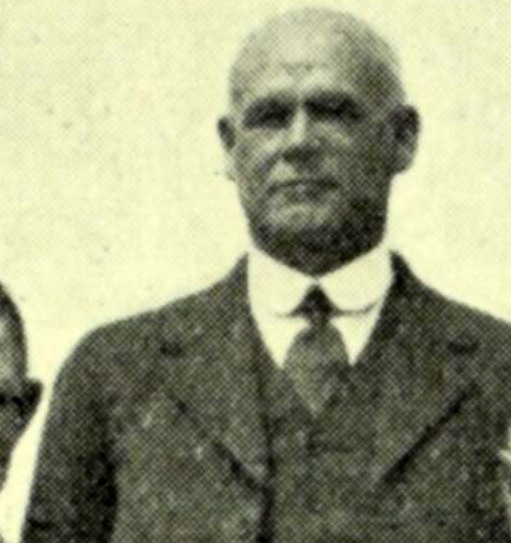
David Bruce Elphinstone 1930

The first house on the land was a weatherboard cottage which forms the core of the current homestead. It was built by Jack Read (1900-1976) who was from the Canberra pioneering Read family. From 1887 this family owned "The Pines" which is now the "Old Canberra Inn". A photo of Jack as a child standing outside the door of “The Pines” in 1910 is shown at this reference. His father was John Read (1868-1917) and his mother was Ellen Maloney (1872-1962). Jack’s full name was Jack Lester Read.

In about 1924 he built a small four-roomed weatherboard house which consisted of a living room, kitchen and two bedrooms with a central bathroom and small verandah and storeroom at the rear. He lived here as a bachelor until 1931 when he relinquished the lease. In the same year he married Elizabeth Ivy Smith. The couple bought the Tottenham Hotel in New South Wales and then in 1935 they bought the Royal Hotel in Braidwood. They later moved to “Waradgery” in Galong and after that to Kensington in Sydney.

When Jack gave up the lease in 1931 it was transferred to David Bruce Elphinstone who made further additions. He added a verandah to the eastern side of the house and a living room with a fireplace to the south.

David Bruce Elphinstone (1880-1948) was born in Glebe, Sydney. His father was David Elphinstone (1846-1916) who was a builder and alderman of the Sydney City Council. He grew up in a house called "Strathnairn" in Summer Hill which his father bought in 1885. It was the Elphinstone family home for over thirty years until 1916.

In 1908 he joined the Master Builders Association and worked in Sydney for many years. In 1919 he married Irene Grace Thompson (1894-1982) and the couple had one daughter. In 1926 he moved to Canberra and formed a partnership with Wesley George to form the firm Messrs George and Elphinstone. They carried out a wide range of building works both for the Government and the private sector. Some of their most notable projects included the Hotel Ainslie (now the Mercure Hotel), repair works on the Hotel Canberra (now the Hyatt Hotel) and completion of the Queanbeyan Hotel. He was President of the Canberra Master Builders Association for many years.

He held the lease of Strathnairn until 1934 when it was acquired by the Baird family. He then moved to Chatswood in Sydney.

== The Baird family ==
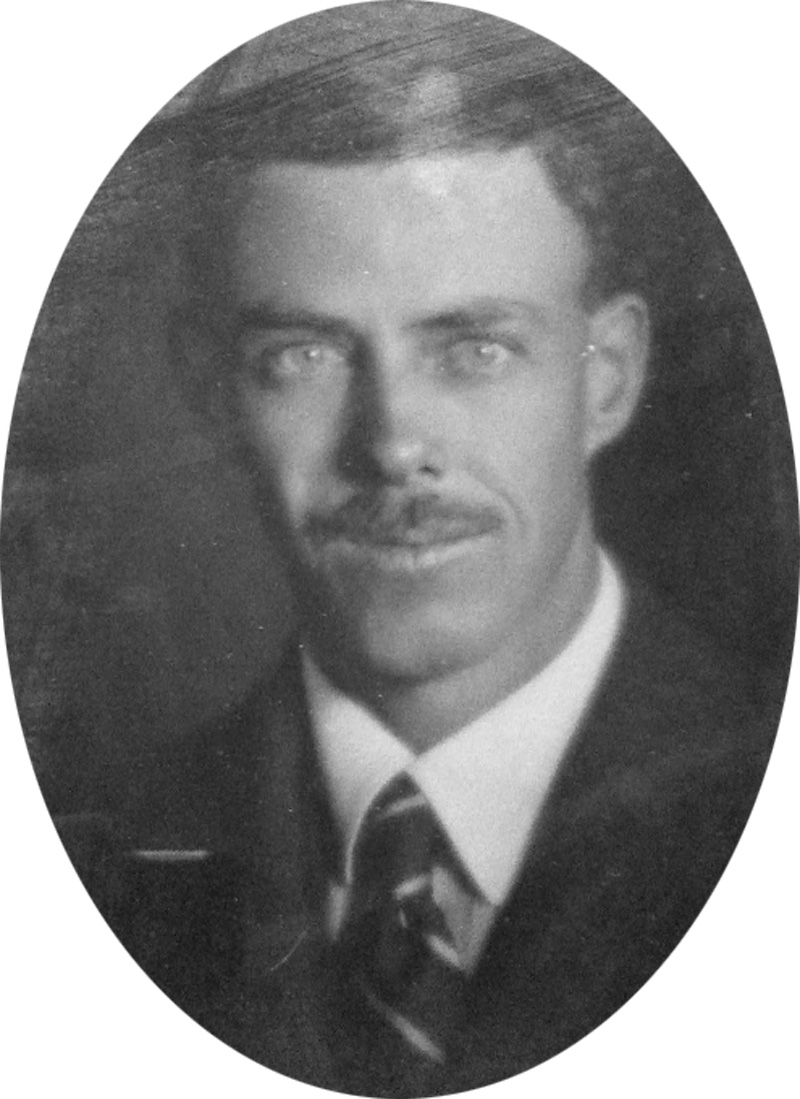
Ian Hamilton Baird

Ian Hamilton Baird (1900-1967) who bought Strathnairn in 1934 came from a family of wealthy pastoralists. His grandfather Matthew Hamilton Baird (1819-1899) was an early pioneer of Victoria who came to the colony in 1841. He and his brother Samuel owned several pastoral runs in the Western District of Victoria which included Glengowe, Warrong and Woodlands which were acquired between 1866 and 1886. Matthew also owned Mount Bute near Skipton and a large residence in St Kilda, Melbourne. 'The Australasian" had a feature article in 1937 about the pastoral pioneers, the Baird brothers.

Matthew’s eldest son John Hamilton Baird (1863-1937) who was Ian’s father was educated at Geelong College and joined his father as a pastoralist. In 1898 he married Jean Molloy, daughter of Dr William Thomas Molloy of Hawthorn. Shortly before his marriage he bought a large property near Bombala called Koorong. Ian his only son was born in 1900.

Ian lived with his family at Bombala, NSW until 1917 when they all moved to a property called Birroon near Gunning. He remained here helping his father until 1934 when he married Ellen Emily Fox (called Nell). She was the daughter of Melbourne Fox, an attorney in Malvern, Victoria. Their wedding was held in South Yarra and described in the newspapers.

Shortly before his marriage Ian acquired Strathnairn and progressively added rooms to the house. The final extension to the north of the homestead was designed by Ken Oliphant, a notable Canberra architect and was completed in 1938.

The couple was very active within the community and often hosted groups which were involved in land management issues including soil conservation. On numerous occasions they entertained dignitaries to provide an insight into rural life. Ian Baird was an executive member of the Canberra Sheep Dog Trials Association and the ACT Rural Lessees Association. During the World War II he served in the Volunteer Defence Corps. Nell Baird participated in local charities and community groups and was president of Canberra YWCA. They were frequently mentioned and their photographs shown in the social pages of the Canberra Times. They also owned a house in Mugga Way which they rented to the Russian Embassy for many years.

In 1963 Ian retired and his son David Hamilton Baird took over the running of Strathnairn. The year before he had married Anne Geraldine Carey at St Andrews Church. Their wedding photo is shown at this reference. They farmed the property until 1974 when it was resumed by the Commonwealth Government.

== Strathnairn Arts Association ==
The Government wanted to establish Strathnairn as a community centre to enable people to express themselves creatively. The first group to be given this task was Blue Folk Community Arts Association who later changed their name to the Brindabella Community Arts Farm. The current group who run the programs at the homestead are Strathnairn Arts Association. They are an amalgamation of the Brindabella Community Arts Farm and Strathnairn Ceramics.

Today this group provides working spaces for painters, sculptors, potters, print makers, wood workers, installation artists and textile artists. In addition the Strathnairn Homestead Galleries feature regular mixed media exhibitions. There is also a shop which displays and sells a range of handmade works by local artists.
