= Murrumbidgee electorate =

Murrumbidgee Australian Capital Territory—Legislative Assembly
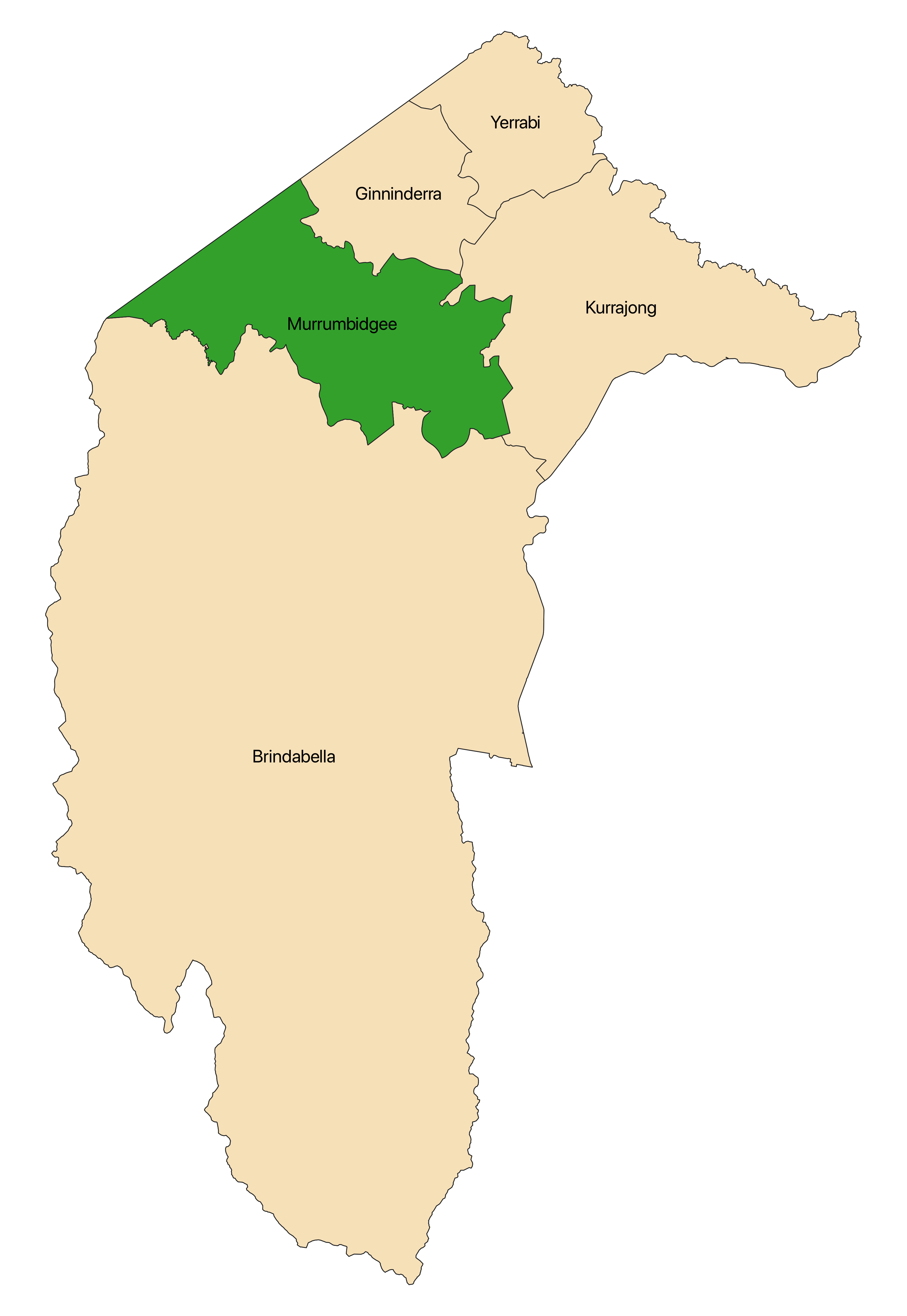
- Territory: Australian Capital Territory
- Created: 2016
- Namesake: Murrumbidgee River
- Electors: 59,323 (2020)
- Area: 250 km^{2} (96.5 sq mi)
- Federal electorates: Bean; Canberra
- Coordinates: 35°18′40″S 148°59′38″E
Electorates around Murrumbidgee:
Goulburn (NSW)	Ginninderra	Kurrajong
Goulburn (NSW)	Murrumbidgee	Kurrajong
Brindabella	Brindabella	Brindabella

The Murrumbidgee electorate is one of the five electorates for the unicameral 25-member Australian Capital Territory Legislative Assembly. It elected five members at the 2016 ACT election.

== History ==
Murrumbidgee was created in 2016, when the five-electorate, 25-member Hare-Clark electoral system was first introduced for the Australian Capital Territory (ACT) Legislative Assembly, replacing the previous three-electorate, 17-member system. The electorate is named after the Murrumbidgee River which flows through the electorate, with the word "Murrumbidgee" meaning "big water" in the Aboriginal Wiradjuri language.

== Location ==
The Murrumbidgee electorate consists of the Woden Valley suburbs of Chifley, Curtin, Farrer, Garran, Hughes, Isaacs, Lyons, Mawson, O'Malley, Pearce, Phillip, Torrens, the Weston Creek suburbs of Chapman, Duffy, Fisher, Holder, Rivett, Stirling, Waramanga, Weston, the Molonglo Valley suburbs of Coombs, Denman Prospect, Whitlam and Wright, the South Canberra suburbs of Deakin, Yarralumla, Forrest and Red Hill as well as the districts of Coree (including the village of Uriarra) and Stromlo.

On the original boundaries contested in 2016 Murrumbidgee included the entire suburb of Kambah. However the boundary redistribution conducted in 2019 transferred the western portion of Kambah to the Brindabella electorate in exchange for gaining the suburbs of Deakin and Yarralumla from the Kurrajong electorate. The 2023 boundary redistribution returned all of Kambah to the Brindabella electorate and moved Forrest and Red Hill from the Kurrajong electorate into the Murrumbidgee electorate.

== Members ==
Year	Member	Party	Member	Party	Member	Party	Member	Party	Member	Party
2016	Bec Cody	Labor	Chris Steel	Labor	Caroline Le Couteur	Greens	Jeremy Hanson	Liberal	Giulia Jones	Liberal
2020	Marisa Paterson	Labor	Chris Steel	Labor	Emma Davidson	Greens	Jeremy Hanson	Liberal	Giulia Jones	Liberal
2022^{1}	Marisa Paterson	Labor	Chris Steel	Labor	Emma Davidson	Greens	Jeremy Hanson	Liberal	Ed Cocks	Liberal
2024	Marisa Paterson	Labor	Chris Steel	Labor	Fiona Carrick	Fiona Carrick Independent	Jeremy Hanson	Liberal	Ed Cocks	Liberal

^{1}Giulia Jones (Liberal) resigned on 2 June 2022. Ed Cocks (Liberal) was elected as her replacement on countback on 20 June 2022

== Election results ==
2024 Australian Capital Territory election: Murrumbidgee
Party	Candidate	Votes	%	±%
Quota		9,309		
Liberal	Jeremy Hanson (elected 1)	7,380	13.2	−2.1
Liberal	Ed Cocks (elected 4)	4,027	7.2	+2.3
Liberal	Amardeep Singh	4,019	7.2	+1.2
Liberal	Karen Walsh	2,486	4.5	+4.5
Liberal	Elyse Heslehurst	1,666	3.0	+3.0
Labor	Chris Steel (elected 2)	6,345	11.4	−2.4
Labor	Marisa Paterson (elected 5)	5,176	9.3	+1.5
Labor	Nelson Tang	3,542	6.3	+6.3
Labor	Anna Whitty	1,990	3.6	+3.6
Labor	Noor El-Asadi	1,476	2.6	+2.6
Fiona Carrick Independent	Fiona Carrick (elected 3)	6,691	12.0	+5.0
Fiona Carrick Independent	Marea Fatseas	341	0.6	+0.6
Fiona Carrick Independent	Bruce Paine	271	0.5	+0.5
Greens	Emma Davidson	2,967	5.3	−1.5
Greens	Sam Carter	840	1.5	+1.5
Greens	Harini Rangarajan	791	1.4	+1.4
Greens	Michael Brewer	605	1.1	+1.1
Independents for Canberra	Paula McGrady	792	1.4	+1.4
Independents for Canberra	Anne-Louise Dawes	624	1.1	+1.1
Independents for Canberra	Nathan Naicker	593	1.1	+1.1
Independents for Canberra	Robert Knight	375	0.7	+0.7
Independents for Canberra	Kathleen Bolt	356	0.6	+0.6
Family First	Andrew Copp	503	0.9	+0.9
Family First	Andy Verri	389	0.7	+0.7
Independent	Rima Diab	862	1.5	+1.5
Animal Justice	Gwenda Griffiths	389	0.7	+0.7
Animal Justice	Ashleigh Griffiths-Smith	353	0.6	+0.6
Total formal votes		55,849	98.4	−0.4
Informal votes		930	1.6	+0.4
Turnout		56,779	88.1	−2.7
Party total votes
Liberal		19,578	35.1	−0.5
Labor		18,529	33.2	−2.9
Fiona Carrick Independent		7,303	13.1	+13.1
Greens		5,203	9.3	−2.4
Independents for Canberra		2,740	4.9	+4.9
Family First		892	1.6	+1.6
Independent	Rima Diab	862	1.5	+1.5
Animal Justice		742	1.3	−0.7
Liberal hold		Swing	−2.1	
Liberal hold		Swing	+2.3	
Labor hold		Swing	−2.4	
Labor hold		Swing	+1.5	
Fiona Carrick Independent gain from Greens		Swing	+5.0	

== See also ==
- Australian Capital Territory Electoral Commission
