= Ed Cocks =

Australian politician (born 1979)

Ed Cocks MLA
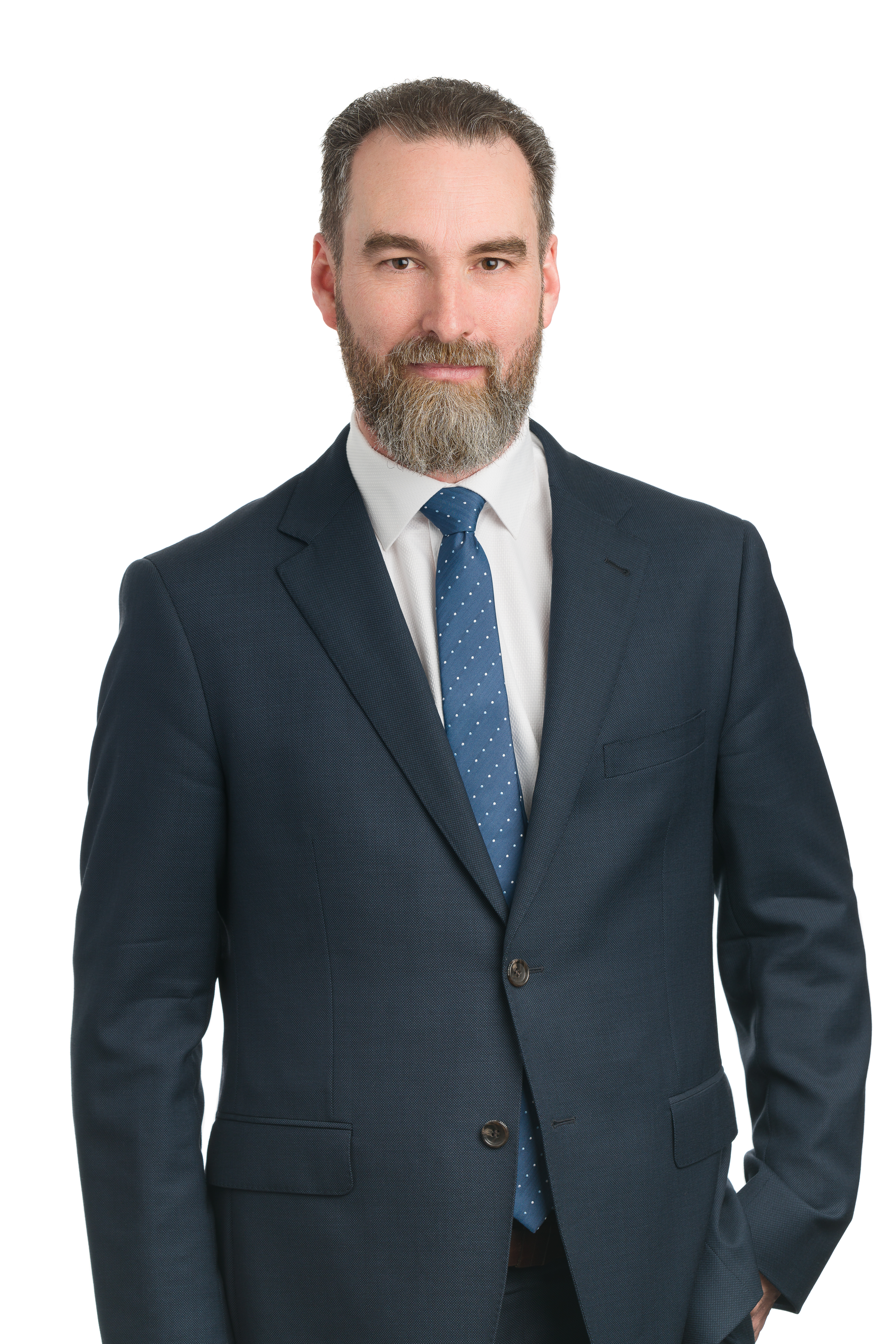

Member of the Australian Capital Territory Legislative Assembly for Murrumbidgee
- Incumbent
- Assumed office 20 June 2022
- Preceded by: Giulia Jones

Personal details
- Born: 1979 (age 46–47)
- Party: Liberal (since 2013)

Ed Cocks (born 1979) is a member of parliament in the Australian Capital Territory Legislative Assembly, representing Murrumbidgee as a member of the Canberra Liberals.

== Early career ==
Cocks briefly worked as a DJ. Cocks then took a job as a mail courier for the Federal Department of Health, and worked his way up through the Department, which sparked his interest in pursuing a degree in management at the University of Canberra as a mature-aged student. Ed became interested in politics at university and joined the Liberal Party in 2013.

== Political career ==
Cocks ran unsuccessfully for the Legislative Assembly at the 2016 election and for the federal seat of Bean in 2019. He ran again for Murrumbidgee at the 2020 election. Although not successful at the election, he was elected in a countback on 20 June 2022 following Giulia Jones's resignation.

On 4 July 2022, Cocks was appointed by opposition leader Elizabeth Lee as Shadow Minister of Mental Health, Jobs and Workplace Affairs and Regulatory Services.

Cocks has advocated for a Molonglo Town Centre, leading a grassroots campaign to advocate for the issue. He also gave a speech about men's mental health in the ACT Legislative Assembly, receiving some local attention in 2022.
