= Emma Davidson =

Australian politician

Emma Davidson MLA
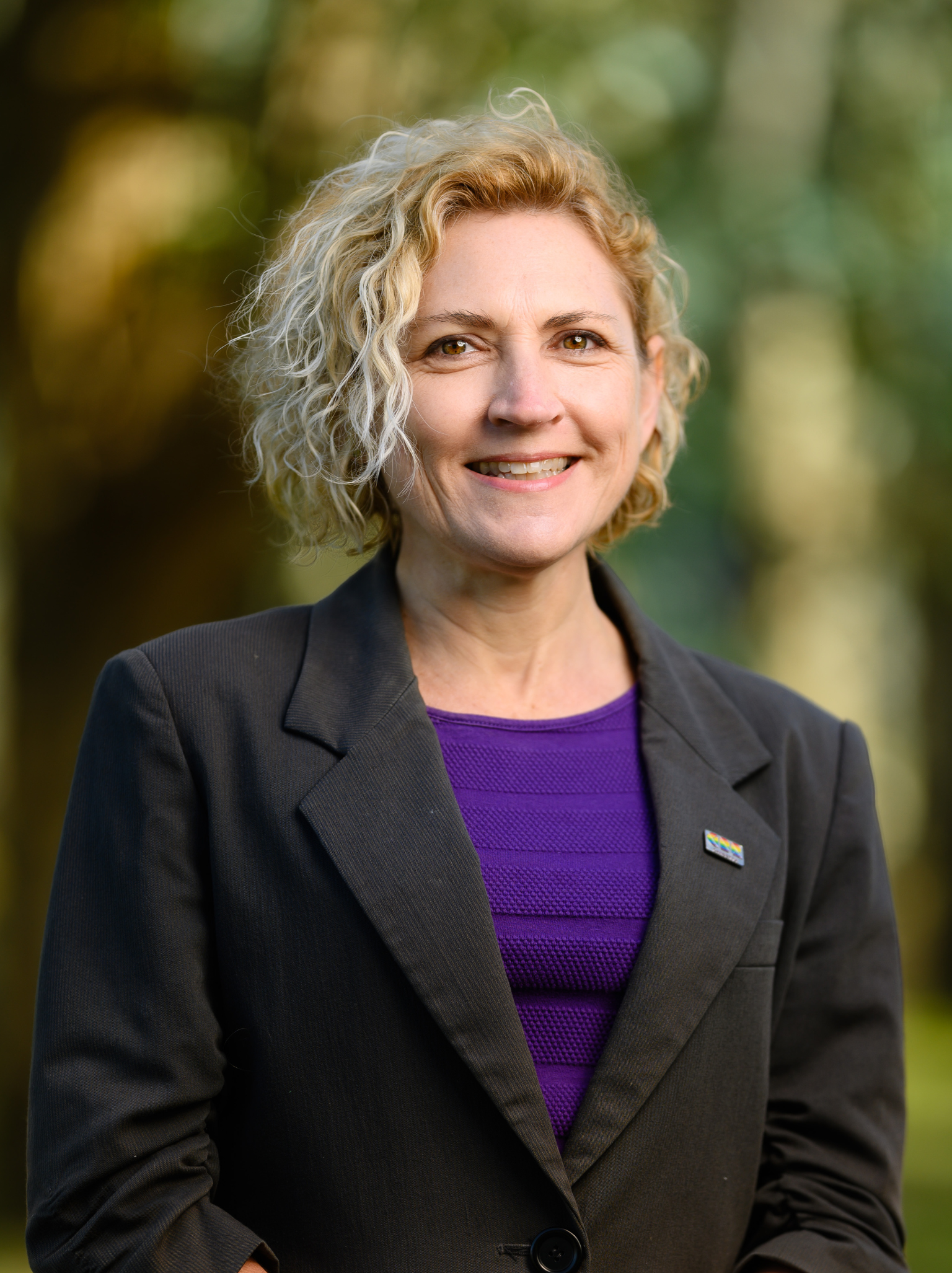

Member of the Australian Capital Territory Legislative Assembly for Murrumbidgee
- In office 17 October 2020 – 19 October 2024
- Preceded by: Caroline Le Couteur
- Succeeded by: Fiona Carrick

Minister for Disability
- In office 4 November 2020 – 12 December 2023
- Leader: Andrew Barr
- Preceded by: Suzanne Orr
- Succeeded by: Rachel Stephen-Smith

Minister for Mental Health
- In office 4 November 2020 – 5 November 2024
- Leader: Andrew Barr
- Preceded by: Shane Rattenbury
- Succeeded by: Rachel Stephen-Smith

Minister for Justice Health
- In office 4 November 2020 – 12 December 2023
- Leader: Andrew Barr
- Preceded by: Shane Rattenbury (Note: As Minister for Corrections and Justice Health.)
- Succeeded by: Herself

Minister for Corrections and Justice Health
- In office 12 December 2023 – 5 November 2024
- Leader: Andrew Barr
- Preceded by: Mick Gentleman (Note: As Minister for Corrections.); Herself (Note: As Minister for Justice Health.)
- Succeeded by: Marisa Paterson

Minister for Population Health
- In office 12 December 2023 – 5 November 2024
- Leader: Andrew Barr
- Preceded by: Position established
- Succeeded by: Position abolished

Assistant Minister for Families and Community Services
- In office 4 November 2020 – 17 February 2021
- Leader: Andrew Barr
- Preceded by: Rachel Stephen-Smith (Note: As Minister for Children, Youth and Families.); Suzanne Orr (Note: As Minister for Community Services and Facilities.)
- Succeeded by: Herself (Note: As Assistant Minister for Seniors, Veterans, Families and Community Services.)

Assistant Minister for Seniors, Veterans, Families and Community Services
- In office 17 February 2021 – 12 December 2023
- Leader: Andrew Barr
- Preceded by: Herself (Note: As Assistant Minister for Families and Community Services.)
- Succeeded by: Herself (Note: As Minister for Community Services, Seniors and Veterans.); Rachel Stephen-Smith (Note: As Minister for Children, Youth and Family Services.)

Minister for Community Services, Seniors and Veterans
- In office 12 December 2023 – 5 November 2024
- Leader: Andrew Barr
- Preceded by: Herself
- Succeeded by: Suzanne Orr (Note: As Minister for Disability, Carers and Community Services, and as Minister for Seniors and Veterans.)

Personal details
- Born: 1974 (age 51–52)
- Party: Greens
- Other political affiliations: What Women Want (2007)

Emma Davidson (born 1974) is an Australian politician, and former Member of the Australian Capital Territory Legislative Assembly representing the ACT Greens.

Before entering politics, Davidson's career focused on advocacy for women, including as convenor of the Women's Electoral Lobby.

At the 2020 Australian Capital Territory election, Davidson won one of the five seats in the electorate of Murrumbidgee.

In the Third Barr ministry, she held a number of ministerial portfolios. In its original arrangement, she was Assistant Minister for Families and Community Services, and Minister for Disability, for Justice Health, and for Mental Health. On 17 February 2021, her Assistant Minister portfolio expanded to Seniors, Veterans, Families and Community Services. On 12 December 2023, there was a cabinet reshuffle, in which Davidson lost the Disability portfolio to Labor's Rachel Stephen-Smith, but became Minister for Population Health. In the same reshuffle, her Justice Health portfolio expanded to Corrections and Justice Health, and she became the Minister for Community Services, Seniors and Veterans.

Davidson lost her seat at the 2024 Australian Capital Territory election to independent Fiona Carrick.

She is currently Program Director of the IDEATE Program at the Australian National University, which aims to make systemic change in the university sector to increase diversity in technology education in Australia.
