= Coree (district) =

District of the Australian Capital Territory

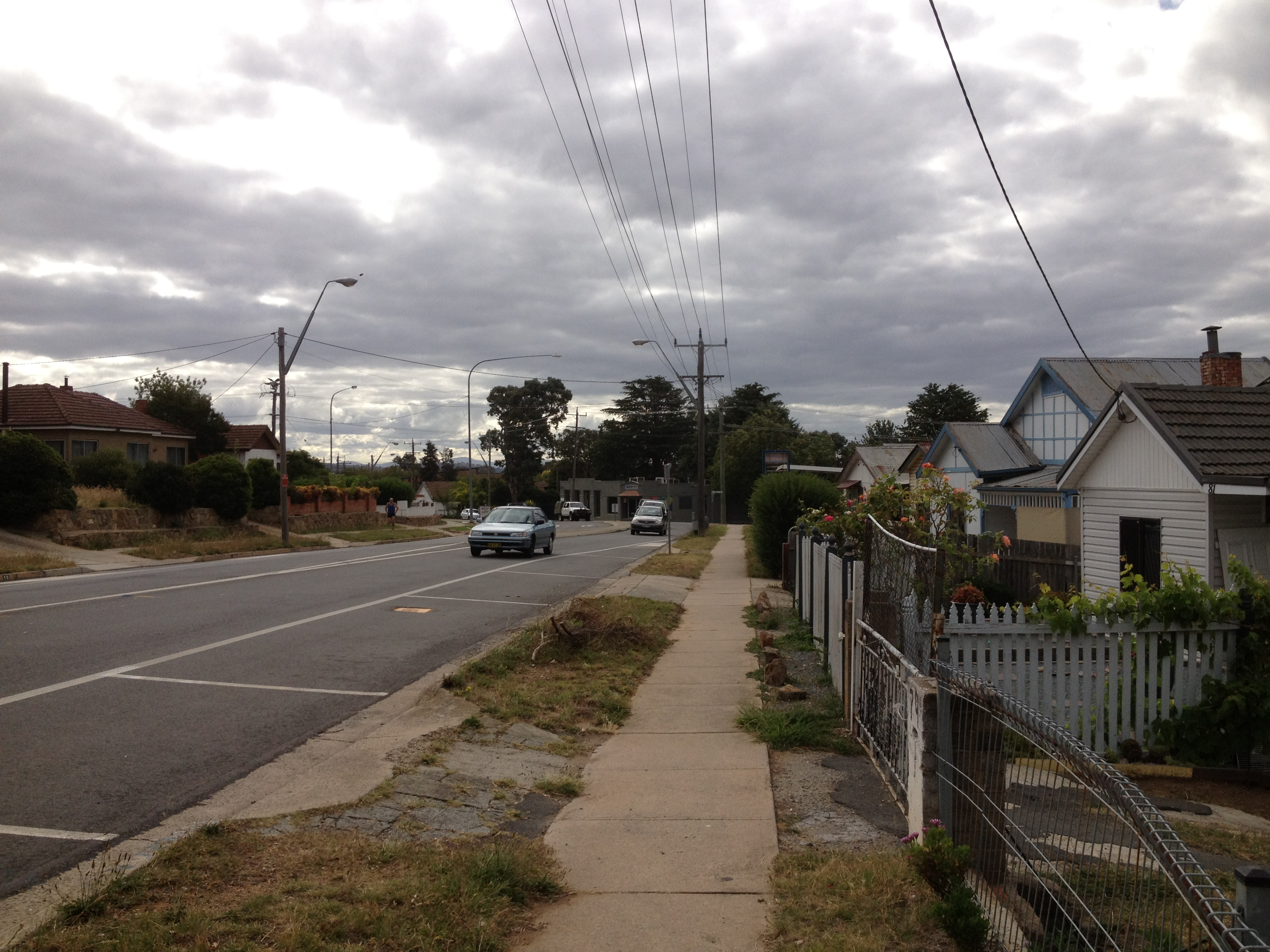
- Partial view of Coree

- Interactive map of Coree
- Coordinates: 35°17′43″S 148°55′31″E
- Country: Australia
- State: Australian Capital Territory

Government
  - Territory electorate: Murrumbidgee
  - Federal division: Bean
- Gazetted: 12 May 1966

Coree is a district in the Australian Capital Territory in Australia.

== Localities ==
- Uriarra Village
