= Marisa Paterson =

Australian politician

Marisa Paterson MLA

Member of the Australian Capital Territory Legislative Assembly for Murrumbidgee
- Incumbent
- Assumed office 17 October 2020
- Preceded by: Bec Cody

Personal details
- Born: Marisa Paterson; 6 November 1982 (age 43)
- Party: Labor Party
- Education: Charles Darwin University (PhD); Australian National University (MAAPD); Monash University (BA)
- Occupation: Politician
- Profession: Academic
- Website: www.marisapaterson.com.au

Marisa Paterson (born 6 November 1982) is an Australian anthropologist, academic and politician. She was elected to the Australian Capital Territory Legislative Assembly in 2020, representing the Australian Labor Party for the electorate of Murrumbidgee.

== Early life and education ==
Paterson was born in Melbourne but spent much of her childhood in the high country of Victoria. She graduated from Monash University with a Bachelor of Arts in Anthropology and Psychology, before moving to Canberra in 2005 to pursue a Masters of Anthropology and participatory Development at the Australian National University.

Following that, Paterson moved to Darwin, Northern Territory to pursue a PhD with Charles Darwin University, studying the impacts of gambling in remote Indigenous communities before returning to Canberra in 2013 to taking up work in a range of research schools and centres at the ANU. In 2017 she became the Director of the Centre for Gambling Research at the ANU and continued to work for the centre until her election to the ACT Legislative Assembly in 2020.

== Political career ==
Paterson contested the seat of Murrumbidgee at the 2020 ACT elections and was elected in 4th position in the five member electorate. She was the only new Labor Member to be elected at the 2020 elections.

She is currently the Deputy Chair of the Standing Committee on Justice and Community Safety and the Chair of the Environment, Climate Change and Biodiversity Committee.

Paterson has campaigned in parliament for reform of the justice system, including expanding restorative justice in the ACT and the shifting of the presumption of bail for serious driving offences. She has also introduced motions on the protection and education of the ACT's snakes and the introduction of safety initiatives in Canberra's night life districts.

She is the only non-aligned Labor Member of the ACT Legislative Assembly.

=== Gambling reform ===
Paterson has been a fierce advocate for gambling reform in the ACT and Australia. In 2022, she initiated her "Bets Off. Game On." which attracted the support of local Canberra community groups and 1015 signatories. In 2023, Paterson campaigned to keep the Molonglo Valley, one of Canberra's newest districts, free from any future poker machines being established and has sought to reform the community club sector to end its reliance on poker machine revenue.

== Selected publications ==
- Young, Martin; Barnes, Tony; Stevens, Matthew; Paterson, Marisa; Morris, Mary (December 2007). "The Changing Landscape of Indigenous Gambling in Northern Australia: Current Knowledge and Future Directions". International Gambling Studies. 7 (3): 327–343. doi:10.1080/14459790701601497. ISSN 1445-9795. S2CID 145381409 – via Taylor and Francis.
- Fogarty, Marisa; Coalter, Nicola; Gordon, Ashley; Breen, Helen (4 August 2016). "Proposing a health promotion framework to address gambling problems in Australian Indigenous communities". Health Promotion International. 33 (1): 115–122. doi:10.1093/heapro/daw060. ISSN 0957-4824. PMID 27492826.
- Fogarty, Marisa (2 November 2017). "The place of cultural competency in 'responsible gambling' practice: challenging notions of informed choice". Addiction Research & Theory. 25 (6): 444–450. doi:10.1080/16066359.2017.1311875. ISSN 1606-6359. S2CID 151715520 – via Taylor and Francis.
- Paterson, Marisa; Taylor, Matthew; Gray, Matthew (February 2020). "Trajectories of Social and Economic Outcomes and Problem Gambling Risk in Australia". Social Indicators Research. 148 (1): 297–321. doi:10.1007/s11205-019-02194-w. hdl:1885/154612. ISSN 0303-8300. S2CID 255005775 – via Springer.
- Paterson, Marisa; Whitty, Megan; Boyer, Charlotte (7 May 2020). "An overview of digital and online strategies to reduce gambling harm". Health Promotion Journal of Australia. 32 (2): 248–257. doi:10.1002/hpja.341. ISSN 1036-1073. PMID 32246884. S2CID 214794282 – via Wiley.
