= Members of the Australian Capital Territory House of Assembly, 1979–1982 =

This is a list of members of the Australian Capital Territory House of Assembly from 1979 to 1982. The ACT was not self-governing at this time.

Name	Party	Electorate	Term in office
Bev Cains	Family Team	Canberra	1979–1986
Peter Christie	Labor	Fraser	1979–1982
John Clements	Labor/Independent ^{[1]}	Fraser	1976–1986
Greg Cornwell	Liberal	Fraser	1975–1986
Ken Doyle	Labor	Canberra	1979–1986
Liz Grant	Liberal	Canberra	1979–1982
Harold Hird	Independent	Fraser	1975–1986
Maurene Horder	Labor	Canberra	1979–1985
Jim Leedman	Liberal	Canberra	1975–1986
Jim Pead	Independent	Canberra	1975–1982
Bill Pye	Independent	Fraser	1978–1982
Marc Robinson	Labor	Fraser	1979–1982
Peter Vallee	Labor	Fraser	1975–1986
Ivor Vivian	Democrats	Fraser	1975–1982
Robyn Walmsley	Labor	Canberra	1979–1985
Gordon Walsh	Democrats	Canberra	1975–1977, 1979–1986
Don Webb	Liberal	Fraser	1979–1982
Paul Whalan	Labor	Canberra	1977–1986

^{1} Fraser MHA John Clements resigned from the Labor Party in April 1982 after being preselected last on the party's ticket for the 1982 election.
