= Members of the Australian Capital Territory Legislative Assembly, 1975–1979 =

This is a list of members of the Australian Capital Territory Legislative Assembly from 1975 to 1979. This was the first time this body sat; it was not self-governing at this time.

Name	Party	Electorate	Term in office
Ron Bell ^{[4]}	Liberal	Fraser	1977–1979
Ian Black	Independent	Canberra	1975–1979
John Clements ^{[1]}	Labor	Fraser	1976–1986
Greg Cornwell	Liberal	Fraser	1975–1986
Allan Fraser ^{[8]}	Independent	Fraser	1975–1978
Harold Hird	Independent	Fraser	1975–1986
Peter Hughes	Liberal/Independent ^{[5]}	Canberra	1975–1979
Trevor Kaine ^{[4]}	Liberal	Fraser	1975–1976, 1982–1986
Ros Kelly	Labor	Canberra	1975–1979
Jim Leedman	Liberal	Canberra	1975–1986
Warren Lennon	Liberal	Fraser	1975–1979
Fred McCauley	Independent	Fraser	1975–1979
Tim McGhie	Liberal	Canberra	1975–1979
George Paulus ^{[2]}	Liberal	Canberra	1976–1979
Jim Pead	Independent	Canberra	1975–1982
Bill Pye ^{[8]}	Independent	Fraser	1978–1982
Susan Ryan ^{[1]}	Labor	Fraser	1975–1976
Ray Saunders ^{[2]}	Liberal	Canberra	1975–1976
Peter Vallee	Labor	Fraser	1975–1986
Ivor Vivian	Australia Party/Democrats ^{[7]}	Fraser	1975–1982
Gordon Walsh ^{[3]}	Labor	Canberra	1975–1977, 1979–1986
Paul Whalan ^{[3]}	Labor	Canberra	1977–1986
Maureen Worsley	Australia Party/Independent ^{[6]}	Canberra	1975–1979

^{1} Labor MLA Susan Ryan resigned in late 1975 in order to contest the 1975 federal election. John Clements was appointed to the casual vacancy in February 1976.
^{2} Liberal MLA Ray Saunders resigned on 13 October 1976. George Paulus was appointed to the casual vacancy on 5 November 1976.
^{3} Labor MLA Gordon Walsh resigned in February 1977. Paul Whalan was appointed to the casual vacancy on 23 February 1977.
^{4} Liberal MLA Trevor Kaine resigned in August 1977. Ron Bell was appointed to the casual vacancy on 12 October 1977.
^{5} Peter Hughes resigned from the Liberal Party, of which he had been leader, on 3 January 1977. He subsequently sat as an independent.
^{6} Maureen Worsley resigned from the Australia Party on 30 August 1977 due to her opposition to Don Chipp and the Australian Democrats merger and subsequently sat as an independent.
^{7} In 1977, the Australia Party became the Australian Democrats; Australia Party MLA Ivor Vivian joined the latter party.
^{8} Independent MLA Allan Fraser died on 12 December 1977. Bill Pye was appointed to the casual vacancy on 22 February 1978.

== See also ==
- 1974 Australian Capital Territory election
