= Members of the Australian Capital Territory House of Assembly, 1982–1986 =

This is a list of members of the Australian Capital Territory House of Assembly from 1982 to 1986. The ACT was not self-governing at this time.

The term was allowed to expire in 1986 due to plans to introduce full self-government for the territory.

Name	Party	Electorate	Term in office
David Adams	Liberal	Canberra	1982–1986
Bev Cains	Family Team	Canberra	1979–1986
John Clements	Independent	Fraser	1976–1986
Greg Cornwell	Liberal	Fraser	1975–1986
Sue Craven	Labor	Fraser	1982–1986
Ken Doyle	Labor	Canberra	1979–1986
Rosemary Follett	Labor	Canberra	1985–1986
Kevin Gill	Labor	Canberra	1985–1986
Harold Hird	Independent	Fraser	1975–1986
Betty Hocking	Family Team	Fraser	1982–1986
Maurene Horder^{[1]}	Labor	Canberra	1979–1985
Trevor Kaine	Liberal	Fraser	1975–1976, 1982–1986
Peter Kobold	Liberal	Canberra	1982–1986
Jim Leedman	Liberal	Canberra	1975–1986
Barry Reid	Labor	Fraser	1982–1986
Joan Taggart	Labor	Canberra	1982–1986
Peter Vallee	Labor	Fraser	1975–1986
Robyn Walmsley^{[2]}	Labor	Canberra	1979–1985
Gordon Walsh	Democrats	Canberra	1975–1977, 1979–1986
Paul Whalan	Labor	Canberra	1977–1986

^{1} Horder resigned from the Assembly in 1985 and was replaced by Kevin Gill. "IN BRIEF New Members". The Canberra Times. Vol. 59, no. 18, 234. Australian Capital Territory, Australia. 2 September 1985. p. 3 – via National Library of Australia.

^{2} Walsmley resigned from the Assembly in 1985 and was replaced by Rosemary Follett. "IN BRIEF New Members". The Canberra Times. Vol. 59, no. 18, 234. Australian Capital Territory, Australia. 2 September 1985. p. 3 – via National Library of Australia.
