= List of Australian Democrats elected representatives =

Logo of the Australian Democrats

Since it was formed in 1977, the Australian Democrats have had a number of elected representatives at the federal, state and local level in Australia.

As of 2026, the Democrats have two serving councillors: Andrew Rowse on the Melbourne City Council and Karen Hyslop on the Northern Grampians Shire Council. Robin Millhouse is recognised as the party's first parliamentarian, while David Winderlich is the last member of the party to sit in any Australian parliament.

== Federal ==
=== Former ===
Image	Name (birth–death)	Office	Term start	Term end	Notes
	Don Chipp (1925−2006)	MP for Hotham	9 May 1977	10 November 1977	Did not contest Hotham and won Senate seat at the 1977 election. Resigned
	Don Chipp (1925−2006)	Senator for Victoria	1 July 1978	18 August 1986	Did not contest Hotham and won Senate seat at the 1977 election. Resigned
	Janine Haines (1945−2004)	Senator for South Australia	14 December 1977	30 June 1978	Appointed to fill casual vacancy. Did not contest 1977 election but was re-elected in 1980. Resigned to unsuccessfully contest Kingston in 1990
	Janine Haines (1945−2004)	Senator for South Australia	1 July 1981	1 March 1990	Appointed to fill casual vacancy. Did not contest 1977 election but was re-elected in 1980. Resigned to unsuccessfully contest Kingston in 1990
	Colin Mason (1926−2020)	Senator for New South Wales	1 July 1978	5 June 1987	Retired
	Michael Macklin (1943−)	Senator for Queensland	1 July 1981	30 June 1990	Retired
	John Siddons (1927−2016)	Senator for Victoria	1 July 1981	4 February 1983	Lost seat. Re-elected in 1984. Left party
	John Siddons (1927−2016)	Senator for Victoria	1 July 1985	5 June 1987	Lost seat. Re-elected in 1984. Left party
	Jack Evans (1928−2009)	Senator for Western Australia	5 March 1983	30 June 1985	Lost seat
	David Vigor (1939–1998)	Senator for South Australia	1 December 1984	5 June 1987	Left party
	Norm Sanders (1932–)	Senator for Tasmania	1 July 1985	1 March 1990	Resigned to unsuccessfully contest Australian Capital Territory Senate seat in 1990
	Janet Powell (1942–2013)	Senator for Victoria	26 August 1986	31 July 1992	Appointed to replace Don Chipp. Left party
	John Coulter (1930–2024)	Senator for South Australia	11 July 1987	20 November 1995	Resigned due to ill health
	Paul McLean (1937–)	Senator for South Australia	11 July 1987	23 August 1991	Resigned
	Jean Jenkins (1938–)	Senator for Western Australia	11 July 1987	30 June 1990	Lost seat
	Vicki Bourne (1954–)	Senator for New South Wales	1 July 1990	30 June 2002	Lost seat
	Sid Spindler (1932–2008)	Senator for Victoria	1 July 1990	30 June 2002	Lost seat
	Cheryl Kernot (1948–)	Senator for Queensland	1 July 1990	15 October 1997	Left party and joined Labor
	Robert Bell (1950–2001)	Senator for Tasmania	7 March 1990	30 June 1996	Lost seat
	Karin Sowada (1961–)	Senator for New South Wales	7 March 1990	30 June 1993	Appointed to replace Paul McLean. Lost seat
	John Woodley (1938–)	Senator for Queensland	1 July 1993	27 July 2001	Resigned
	Meg Lees (1948–)	Senator for New South Wales	4 April 1990	26 July 2002	Left party
	Natasha Stott Despoja (1969–)	Senator for South Australia	29 November 1995	30 June 2008	Retired
	Lyn Allison (1946–)	Senator for Victoria	1 July 1996	30 June 2008	Lost seat
	Andrew Murray (1947–)	Senator for Western Australia	1 July 1996	30 June 2008	Retired
	Andrew Bartlett (1964–)	Senator for Queensland	30 October 1997	30 June 2008	Lost seat
	Aden Ridgeway (1962–)	Senator for New South Wales	1 July 1999	30 June 2005	Lost seat
	Brian Greig (1966–)	Senator for Western Australia	1 July 1999	30 June 2005	Lost seat
	John Cherry (1965–)	Senator for Queensland	31 July 2001	30 June 2005	Lost seat

== State ==
=== Australian Capital Territory ===
==== Former ====
Image	Name (birth–death)	Office	Term start	Term end	Notes
	Ivor Vivian (1932–)	MHA for Fraser	9 May 1977	5 June 1982	Joined party when it formed. Lost seat
	Gordon Walsh (1932–2000)	MHA for Canberra	9 May 1977	30 June 1986	Joined party when it formed. Remained in House of Assembly until it was dissolved
	Roslyn Dundas (1978–)	MLA for Ginninderra	20 October 2001	16 October 2004	Lost seat

=== New South Wales ===
==== Former ====
Image	Name (birth–death)	Office	Term start	Term end	Notes
	Elisabeth Kirkby (1921–2026)	Member of the Legislative Council	27 October 1981	25 June 1998	Retired
	Richard Jones (1940–)	Member of the Legislative Council	13 March 1988	12 March 1996	Left party
	Arthur Chesterfield-Evans (1950–)	Member of the Legislative Council	25 June 1998	2 April 2007	Lost seat

=== South Australia ===
==== Former ====
Image	Name (birth–death)	Office	Term start	Term end	Notes
	Robin Millhouse (1929–2017)	MHA for Mitcham	9 May 1977	7 April 1982	Resigned after accepting position of South Australian Supreme Court justice
	Lance Milne (1915–1995)	Member of the Legislative Council	15 September 1979	1 December 1985	Retired and left party five days before 1985 state election
	Heather Southcott (1928–2014)	MHA for Mitcham	8 May 1982	6 November 1982	Won by-election to replace Robin Millhouse. Lost seat at state election held six months later
	Ian Gilfillan (1932–)	Member of the Legislative Council	6 November 1982	18 November 1993	Resigned to unsuccessfully contest Norwood at 1993 state election. Re-elected in 1997. Retired
	Ian Gilfillan (1932–)	Member of the Legislative Council	11 October 1997	18 March 2006	Resigned to unsuccessfully contest Norwood at 1993 state election. Re-elected in 1997. Retired
	Mike Elliott (1952–)	Member of the Legislative Council	7 December 1985	18 November 1993	Resigned to unsuccessfully contest Davenport at 1993 state election. Appointed to replace Ian Gilfillan. Resigned to retire from politics
	Mike Elliott (1952–)	Member of the Legislative Council	10 February 1994	10 December 2002	Resigned to unsuccessfully contest Davenport at 1993 state election. Appointed to replace Ian Gilfillan. Resigned to retire from politics
	Sandra Kanck (1950–)	Member of the Legislative Council	11 December 1993	31 January 2009	Resigned
	Kate Reynolds (1962–)	Member of the Legislative Council	17 February 2003	18 March 2006	Appointed to replace Mike Elliott. Lost seat
	David Winderlich (1964–)	Member of the Legislative Council	17 February 2009	7 October 2009	Appointed to replace Sandra Kanck. Left party

=== Tasmania ===
==== Former ====
Image	Name (birth–death)	Office	Term start	Term end	Notes
	Norm Sanders (1932–)	MHA for Denison	16 February 1980	23 December 1982	Resigned

=== Western Australia ===
==== Former ====
Image	Name (birth–death)	Office	Term start	Term end	Notes
	Helen Hodgson (1961–)	MLC for North Metropolitan	22 May 1997	21 May 2001	Lost seat
	Norm Kelly (1959–)	MLC for East Metropolitan	22 May 1997	21 May 2001	Lost seat

== Local ==
=== Victoria ===
==== Current ====
Image	Name (birth–death)	Office	Term start (council service)	Term end	Notes
	Andrew Rowse	Councillor for City of Melbourne	19 November 2024	TBD	Joined the party in October 2026.
	Karen Hyslop	Councillor for Shire of Northern Grampians, Central Ward	Re-elected in 2024	TBD	First elected in 2012. Joined the party in November 2026.

=== New South Wales ===
==== Former ====
Image	Name (birth–death)	Office	Term start	Term end	Notes
	Greg Butler	Councillor for Wingecarribee Shire	9 September 1995	11 September 1999	
	Peter Furness	Councillor of the City of South Sydney for South Ward	1 July 2000	11 April 2003	Left party
