= 1970 Australian Capital Territory election =

- 12 September 1970

All 8 seats on the Australian Capital Territory Advisory Council

	First party	Second party	Third party
		AUS
Leader	Gordon Walsh	Alan Fitzgerald	Jim Leedman
Party	Labor	Australia	Liberal
Leader since	8 July 1967	24 August 1970	1966
Last election	3 seats	Did not exist	2 seats
Seats before	3	1	2
Seats won	3	1	1
Seat change	Steady	Steady	▼1
First preference vote	14,918	10,954	6,634
Percentage	30.32%	22.27%	13.48%
Swing		▲22.27

The 1970 Australian Capital Territory election was held on 12 September 1970 to elect all eight members of the Advisory Council, the main elected representative body of the Australian Capital Territory (ACT). The election was conducted by the Commonwealth Electoral Office, with 18 candidates and four political parties contesting.

Four members of the previous council were re-elected, with Labor Party leader Gordon Walsh receiving the highest first preference vote of 25.68%. Alan Fitzgerald, who was elected in 1967 as part of the satirical True Whig Party, was re-elected with 21.9% of the vote as the leader of the Australia Party, ahead of Liberal leader Jim Leedman.

This was the final election for the Advisory Council, which was replaced by the Legislative Assembly (later known as the House of Assembly) in 1974.

== Results ==
1970 Australian Capital Territory election
Party	Candidate	Votes	%	±%
Quota		5,466		
Labor	Gordon Walsh (elected)	12,633	25.68	
Australia	Alan Fitzgerald (elected)	10,778	21.91	
Independent	Jim Pead (elected)	6,315	12.83	
Liberal	Jim Leedman (elected)	6,264	12.73	
Independent	Ian Black (elected)	3,139	6.38	
Independent	Anne Dalgarno (elected)	2,824	5.74	
Democratic Labor	Terence Christie	1,991	4.04	
Labor	Noelle Gleeson	1,063	2.16	
Independent	Bill Pye	976	1.98	
Labor	Fred McCauley (elected)	962	1.95	
Independent	Augustin (Gus) Petersilka	685	1.39	
Independent	Mary Moore	449	0.91	
Independent	Mike Cavanough	302	0.61	
Labor	Ken Fry (elected)	260	0.52	
Liberal	Tony Pratten	235	0.47	
Liberal	Alan Harper	135	0.27	
Australia	Bill Robinson	93	0.18	
Australia	Derek Emerson-Elliott	83	0.16	
Total formal votes		49,187	91.16	
Informal votes		4,769	8.84	
Turnout		53,956		
Party total votes
Labor		14,918	30.32	
Independent		14,690	29.89	
Australia		10,954	22.27	
Liberal		6,634	13.48	
Democratic Labor		1,991	4.04	
