= ACT Labor Party leadership elections =

The ACT Labor Party, the division of the Australian Labor Party in the Australian Capital Territory (ACT), has held a number of leadership elections and deputy leadership elections. The most recent was held in November 2020, although the most recent leadership change was in December 2014.

== 1982 election ==
1982 ACT Labor Party leadership election
- 23 June 1982
Candidate	Ken Doyle
Caucus vote	Won
Seat	Canberra
Leader before election
Peter Vallee
Elected Leader
Ken Doyle

The 1982 ACT Labor Party leadership election was held on 23 June 1982

On 28 April 1982, Peter Vallee announced he would resign as Labor leader to allow the party to have a female leader, which he said would "more closely reflect the wishes of the ACT Labor branch". The same day, Labor MHA John Clements resigned from the party because of what he said was "faction fighting and the dominance of radical feminists".

The following day on 29 April, Canberra MHA Robyn Walmsley became the party's interim leader for the 1982 election, which was held on 5 June. Labor won eight seats at the election, making them the largest party in the House of Assembly.

After the election, Walmsley was succeeded by fellow Canberra MHA Ken Doyle, who was elected leader at a caucus meeting on 23 June 1982.

=== Results ===
1982 ACT Labor Party leadership election
Faction	Candidate	Votes	%	±%
Labor	Ken Doyle			
Total votes		8		

== 1983 spill ==
1983 ACT Labor Party leadership spill
- 7 March 1983

Candidate	Maurene Horder	Ken Doyle
Caucus vote	5	3
Percentage	62.5%	37.5%
Seat	Canberra	Canberra
Leader before election
Ken Doyle
Elected Leader
Maurene Horder

The 1983 ACT Labor Party leadership spill was held on 7 March 1983.

On the evening of 7 March, a leadership spill took place. The Hawke government had been elected just two days earlier, and it was believed that new leadership would be able to build a closer relationship with the federal government.

Incumbent Labor leader Ken Doyle, who had led the party for less than a year, was defeated by fellow Canberra MHA Maurene Horder. Horder won the leadership five votes to three, becoming the first woman to lead a parliamentary Labor Party in any of the Australian states or territories, albeit in a parliament that only had an advisory role. Although Robyn Walmsley had headed the party for several months in 1982, she was only in an interim position.

Doyle said he was "caught by surprise", and told The Canberra Times that "I could see no substantive reason for change. It was unwarranted. I have been extremely dedicated in leading the Labor Party. I have promoted the ALP at every opportunity and have raised every issue which needed to be addressed".

Barry Reid was elected deputy leader, Paul Whalan was elected caucus chairman and Robyn Walmsley was elected secretary of caucus and Assembly whip.

=== Results ===
1983 ACT Labor Party leadership spill
Faction	Candidate	Votes	%	±%
Labor	Maurene Horder	5	62.5	
Labor	Ken Doyle	3	37.5	
Total votes		8		

== 1985 election ==
1985 ACT Labor Party leadership election
- 28 June 1985

Candidate	Paul Whalan	unknown	unknown
Caucus vote	less than 5	less than 5	less than 5
Seat	Canberra	unknown	unknown
Faction	Right	unknown	unknown
Final ballot	Won	Defeated
Leader before election
Maurene Horder
Elected Leader
Paul Whalan

The 1985 ACT Labor Party leadership election was held on 28 June 1985.

On 24 June 1985, Labor leader Maurene Horder announced her resignation as leader and from the House of Assembly. She was announced the following day as a federal ministerial advisor to Chris Hurford, the Minister for Immigration and Ethnic Affairs.

At a caucus meeting on 28 June, at least three candidates contested the leadership, including caucus chairman Paul Whalan. No candidate initially had a majority, but on the final ballot, Whalan emerged victorious.

=== Results ===
1985 ACT Labor Party leadership election
Faction	Candidate	Votes	%	±%
Labor Right	Paul Whalan	less than 5		
Labor	unknown	less than 5		
Labor	unknown	less than 5		
Final ballot result
Labor Right	Paul Whalan	5 or more		
Labor	unknown	3 or less		
Total votes		8		

== 1988 election ==
1988 ACT Labor Party leadership election
- 17 December 1988
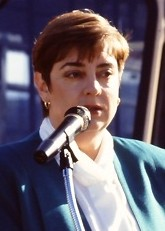

Candidate	Rosemary Follett	Paul Whalan
Members vote	Won	Defeated
Faction	Left	Right
Leader before election
No leader
Elected Leader
Rosemary Follett

The 1988 ACT Labor Party leadership election was held on 17 December 1988.

Following the dissolution of the House of Assembly on 30 June 1986, Labor was left without a formal leader.

Ahead of the 1989 ACT election, the first under self-government, Labor held a preselection to decide its 11 candidates. 18 candidates ran for preselection, with around 600 rank-and-file party members were able to vote.

Left faction leader Rosemary Follett narrowly defeated Paul Whalan, the leader of the Right faction and the former Labor House of Assembly leader, by a margin of just 14 votes. This was a surprise victory, as Whalan was seen as a favourite based on the Right's strength within the party, although the majority of members did not belong to any faction. Whalan became Labor's deputy leader.

Just days before the 1989 election, Whalan planned to challenge Follett for the leadership if enough Right faction members were elected, even if Labor won government. However, he instead decided to let Follett handle the difficulties of the first term, after which he would mount a challenge in the lead up to the next election.

Ultimately, Whalan never officially challenged Follett and resigned from the Legislative Assembly on 30 April 1990, criticising Follett outside of parliament.

=== Results ===
1988 ACT Labor Party leadership election
Faction	Candidate	Votes	%	±%
Labor Left	Rosemary Follett			
Labor Right	Paul Whalan			
Total votes		c. 600		

== 2014 election ==
2014 ACT Labor Party leadership election
- 10 December 2014
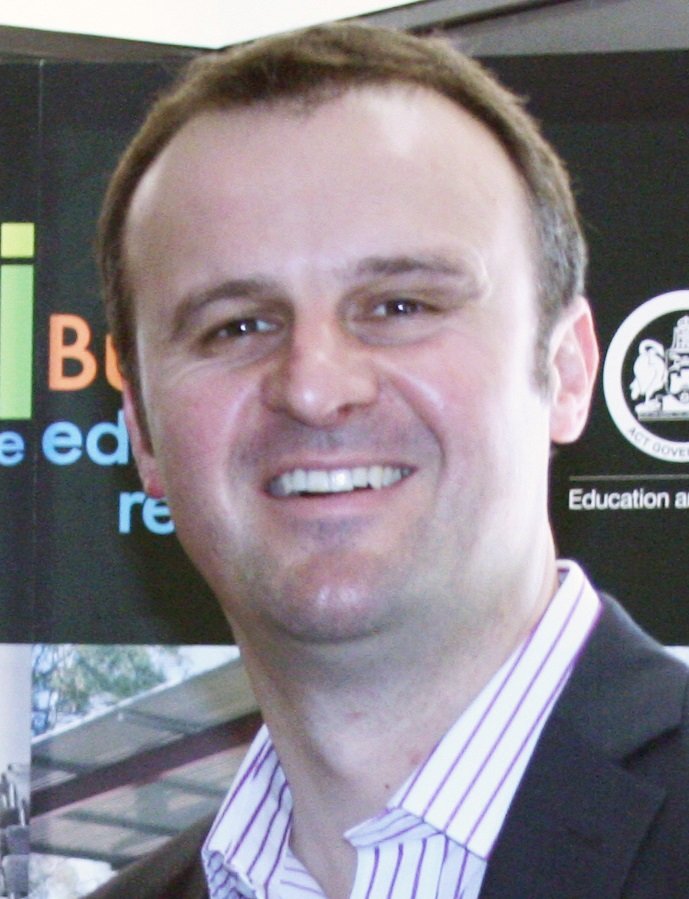
Candidate	Andrew Barr
Caucus vote	Unopposed
Seat	Molonglo
Faction	Right
Leader before election
Katy Gallagher
Elected Leader
Andrew Barr

The 2014 ACT Labor Party leadership election was held on 10 December 2014.

On 5 December 2014, chief minister and Labor leader Katy Gallagher announced she would resign in order to contest a Senate vacancy caused by the resignation of Kate Lundy. She endorsed deputy chief minister Andrew Barr as her successor.

At a caucus meeting on 10 December, Barr was elected unopposed as leader. He was officially sworn in as chief minister the following day on 11 December, becoming the first openly LGBTI head of government in Australia.

Simon Corbell, a member of the Left faction, was elected as deputy leader.

=== Candidates ===
Candidate	Electorate	Faction	Announced
Andrew Barr	Molonglo	Right	6 December 2014

=== Results ===
2014 ACT Labor Party leadership election
Faction	Candidate	Votes	%	±%
Labor Right	Andrew Barr	unopposed		
Total votes		8		

== 2016 election ==
2016 ACT Labor Party leadership election
- 24 October 2016
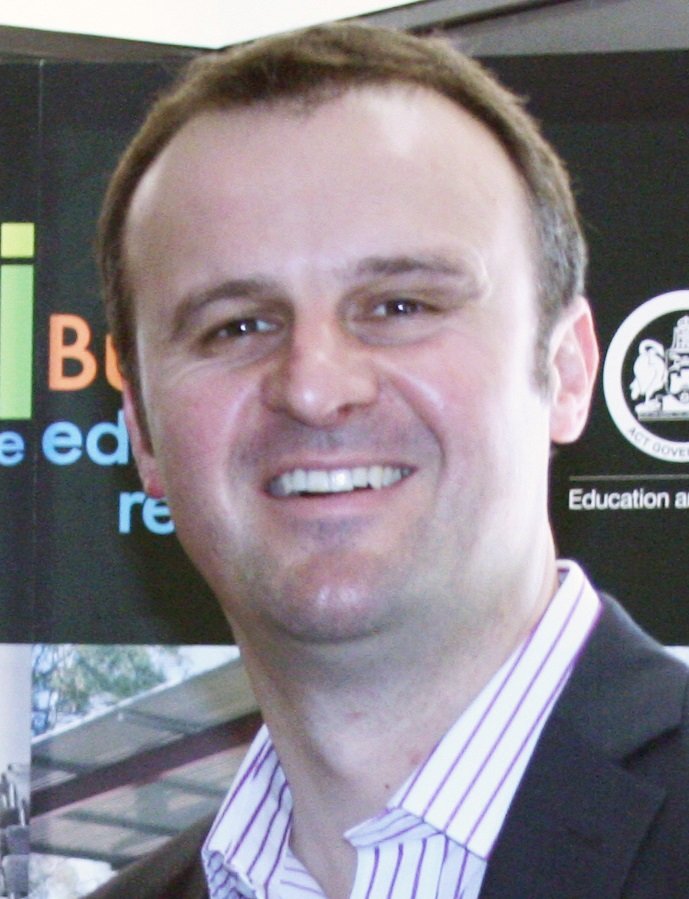
Candidate	Andrew Barr
Caucus vote	Unopposed
Seat	Kurrajong
Faction	Right
Leader before election
Andrew Barr
Elected Leader
Andrew Barr

The 2016 ACT Labor Party leadership election was held on 24 October 2016.

Following the 2016 ACT election, in which Labor won 12 seats, the party's caucus voted on its leadership team.

Andrew Barr was re-elected unopposed as Labor leader, while Left faction member Yvette Berry became the new deputy leader following the retirement of Simon Corbell, having received Berry's endorsement.

=== Candidates ===
Candidate	Electorate	Faction	Announced
Andrew Barr	Kurrajong	Right	24 October 2016

=== Results ===
2016 ACT Labor Party leadership election
Faction	Candidate	Votes	%	±%
Labor Right	Andrew Barr	unopposed		
Total votes		12		

== 2020 election ==
2020 ACT Labor Party leadership election
- 2 November 2020
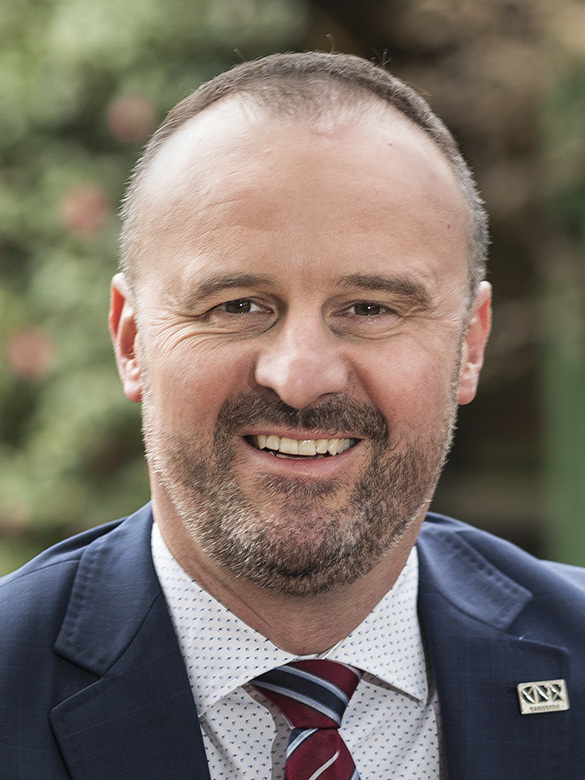
Candidate	Andrew Barr
Caucus vote	Unopposed
Seat	Kurrajong
Faction	Right
Leader before election
Andrew Barr
Elected Leader
Andrew Barr

The 2020 ACT Labor Party leadership election was held on 2 November 2020.

Following the 2020 ACT election, in which Labor won 10 seats, the party's caucus voted on its leadership team.

Andrew Barr and Yvette Berry were re-elected as leader and deputy leader respectively.

=== Candidates ===
Candidate	Electorate	Faction	Announced
Andrew Barr	Kurrajong	Right	2 November 2020

=== Results ===
2020 ACT Labor Party leadership election
Faction	Candidate	Votes	%	±%
Labor Right	Andrew Barr	unopposed		
Total votes		10		
