= Electoral results for the Australian Senate in the Australian Capital Territory =

This is a list of electoral results for the Australian Senate in the Australian Capital Territory since 1975.

== Election results ==
=== Elections in the 2020s ===
==== 2025 ====
The incumbent senators in the Australian Capital Territory whose seats were vacated at this election are:

- The Hon Katy Gallagher (ALP)
- David Pocock (IND)

David Pocock was re-elected.

2025 Australian federal election: Senate, Australian Capital Territory
Party	Candidate	Votes	%	±%
Quota		85,915		
David Pocock	1. David Pocock (elected 1); 2. Hannah Vardy	102,165	39.64	+18.46
Labor	1. Katy Gallagher (elected 2); 2. Janaline Oh	81,496	31.62	−1.75
Liberal	1. Jacob Vadakkedathu; 2. Hayune Lee	45,070	17.49	–7.31
Greens	1. Christina Hobbs; 2. Jo Rocke	19,633	7.62	−2.67
Animal Justice	1. Robyn Soxsmith; 2. Walter Kudrycz	3,489	1.35	+0.69
HEART–Libertarian joint ticket	1. Elise Searson-Prakaash; 2. Martin Brown	2,970	1.15	+1.15
Sustainable Australia	1. James Holgate; 2. John Haydon	2,921	1.13	+0.56
Total formal votes		257,744	97.57	−0.68
Informal votes		6,423	2.43	+0.68
Turnout		264,167	81.95	−10.50

Results are not final. Last updated on 13 May 2025 at 7:10 PM AEST.

==== 2022 ====
#	Senator	Party
1	Katy Gallagher	Labor
2	David Pocock	David Pocock

2022 Australian federal election: Senate, Australian Capital Territory
Party	Candidate	Votes	%	±%
Quota		95,073		
Labor	1. Katy Gallagher (elected 1); 2. Maddy Northam	95,184	33.37	−5.98
Liberal	1. Zed Seselja; 2. Kacey Lam	70,739	24.80	−7.58
David Pocock	1. David Pocock (elected 2); 2. Clare Doube	60,406	21.18	+21.18
Greens	1. Tjanara Goreng Goreng; 2. James Cruz	29,360	10.29	−7.42
Kim for Canberra	1. Kim Rubenstein; 2. Kim Huynh	12,622	4.43	+4.43
United Australia	1. James Savoulidis; 2. Tracey Page	6,112	2.14	–0.13
Legalise Cannabis	1. Andrew Katelaris; 2. Michelle Stanvic	4,516	1.58	+1.58
Animal Justice	1. Yana Del Valle; 2. Jannah Fahiz	1,889	0.66	+0.66
Sustainable Australia	1. Joy Angel; 2. John Haydon	1,638	0.57	–1.08
Informed Medical Options	1. Michael Simms; 2. Mary-Jane Liddicoat	1,458	0.51	+0.51
Progressives	1. Therese Faulkner; 2. Stephen Lin	726	0.25	+0.25
Ungrouped	Fuxin Li	567	0.20	−5.54
Total formal votes		285,217	98.25	+0.57
Informal votes		5,091	1.75	–0.57
Turnout		290,308	92.45	−1.06
Party total seats			Seats	±
Labor			1	Steady
David Pocock			1	▲1
Liberal			0	▼1

=== Elections in the 2010s ===
==== 2019 ====
2019 Australian federal election: Senate, Australian Capital Territory
Party	Candidate	Votes	%	±%
Quota		90,078		
Labor	1. Katy Gallagher (elected 1); 2. Nancy Waites	106,330	39.35	+1.41
Liberal	1. Zed Seselja (elected 2); 2. Robert Gunning	87,492	32.38	−0.83
Greens	1. Penny Kyburz; 2. Emma Davidson	47,855	17.71	+1.61
Group C	1. Anthony Pesec; 2. Gary Kent	12,604	4.66	+4.66
United Australia	1. Peter Walter; 2. Rebecah Hodgson	6,130	2.27	+2.27
Sustainable Australia	1. John Haydon; 2. Joy Angel	4,463	1.65	+0.60
Conservative National	1. Shane van Duren; 2. Scott Birkett	2,461	0.91	+0.91
Ungrouped	Nick Houston; Gary Cowton; David Kim	2,896	1.07	+0.67
Total formal votes		270,231	97.68	−0.11
Informal votes		6,420	2.32	+0.11
Turnout		276,651	93.51	+1.14

Elected	#	Senator	Party
2019	1	Katy Gallagher	Labor
2019	2	Zed Seselja	Liberal

==== 2016 ====
2016 Australian federal election: Senate, Australian Capital Territory
Party	Candidate	Votes	%	±%
Quota		84,923		
Labor	1. Katy Gallagher (elected 1); 2. David Smith	96,667	37.94	+3.50
Liberal	1. Zed Seselja (elected 2); 2. Jane Hiatt	84,615	33.21	+0.13
Greens	1. Christina Hobbs; 2. Sue Wareham	41,006	16.10	−3.17
Sex Party	1. Steven Bailey; 2. Robbie Swan	10,096	3.96	+0.47
Liberal Democrats	1. Matt Donnelly; 2. Cawley Hennings	7,460	2.93	+2.93
Animal Justice	1. Deborah Field; 2. Jessica Montagne	4,251	1.67	+0.46
Christian Democrats	1. David Kim; 2. Elizabeth Tadros	3,087	1.21	+1.21
Sustainable Australia	1. John Haydon; 2. Martin Tye	2,678	1.05	+0.67
Rise Up Australia	1. Sandie O'Connor; 2. Jess Wyatt	2,523	0.99	+0.43
Secular	1. David Edwards; 2. Denis Mihaljevic	1,378	0.54	+0.54
Ungrouped	Michael Hay; Anthony Hanson	1,006	0.39	+0.18
Total formal votes		254,767	97.79	−0.23
Informal votes		5,754	2.21	+0.23
Turnout		260,521	92.34	−2.53

#	Senator	Party
1	Katy Gallagher	Labor
2	Zed Seselja	Liberal

==== 2013 ====
2013 Australian federal election: Senate, Australian Capital Territory
Party	Candidate	Votes	%	±%
Quota		82,248		
Labor	1. Kate Lundy (elected 1); 2. Chris Sant	84,974	34.44	−6.40
Liberal	1. Zed Seselja (elected 2); 2. Merinda Nash	81,613	33.08	−0.27
Greens	1. Simon Sheikh; 2. Indra Esguerra	47,553	19.27	−3.65
Sex Party	1. Deborah Avery; 2. Jamie Miller	8,616	3.49	+3.49
Palmer United	1. Wayne Slattery; 2. Paul Teerman	5,213	2.11	+2.11
Bullet Train	1. Chris Bucknell; 2. Michael Lemmey	5,066	2.05	+2.05
Voluntary Euthanasia	1. Philip Nitschke; 2. Susan Macdougall	3,963	1.61	+1.61
Animal Justice	1. Marcus Fillinger; 2. Jessica Montagne	2,992	1.21	+1.21
Australian Independents	1. Anthony Fernie; 2. Valma Petersen	1,592	0.65	+0.65
Katter's Australian	1. Steven Bailey; 2. Joe Arnold	1,416	0.57	+0.57
Rise Up Australia	1. Irwin Ross; 2. Jose Henriquez	1,381	0.56	+0.56
Stable Population	1. Mark O'Connor; 2. Greg Graham	931	0.38	+0.38
Drug Law Reform	1. Paul Cubitt; 2. Stacey Dowson	914	0.37	+0.37
Independent	Emmanuel Ezekiel-Hart	518	0.21	+0.21
Total formal votes		246,742	98.02	+0.57
Informal votes		4,980	1.98	−0.57
Turnout		251,722	94.82	−0.07

Elected	#	Senator	Party
2013	1	Kate Lundy	Labor
2013	2	Zed Seselja	Liberal

==== 2010 ====
2010 Australian federal election: Senate, Australian Capital Territory
Party	Candidate	Votes	%	±%
Quota		76,425		
Labor	1. Kate Lundy (elected 1); 2. David Mathews	93,639	40.84	+0.00
Liberal	1. Gary Humphries (elected 2); 2. Matthew Watts	76,463	33.35	−0.85
Greens	1. Lin Hatfield Dodds; 2. Hannah Parris	52,546	22.92	+1.46
Democrats	1. Darren Churchill; 2. Anthony David	4,057	1.77	−0.07
Independent	John Glynn	2,567	1.12	+1.12
Total formal votes		229,272	97.45	−0.85
Informal votes		5,999	2.55	+0.85
Turnout		235,271	94.89	−1.11

Elected	#	Senator	Party
2010	1	Kate Lundy	Labor
2010	2	Gary Humphries	Liberal

Labor Senator Kate Lundy was re-elected with well over a quota. Liberal Senator Gary Humphries was also re-elected, with just over (1.01x) a quota. Although the Greens received significantly more votes than in 2007, the two ACT Senators were elected on quotas, leaving no room for preference flows.

=== Elections in the 2000s ===
==== 2007 ====
Elected	#	Senator	Party
2007	1	Kate Lundy	Labor
2007	2	Gary Humphries	Liberal

2007 Australian federal election: Senate, Australian Capital Territory
Party	Candidate	Votes	%	±%
Quota		75,108		
Labor	1. Kate Lundy (elected 1); 2. Peter Conway	92,018	40.84	−0.26
Liberal	1. Gary Humphries (elected 2); 2. Jacqui Myers	77,058	34.20	−3.67
Greens	1. Kerrie Tucker; 2. Elena Kirschbaum	48,384	21.47	+5.11
Democrats	1. Norvan Vogt; 2. Anthony David	4,141	1.84	−0.30
What Women Want	1. Emma Davidson; 2. Shannon Morris	1,406	0.62	+0.62
Climate Change	1. Michael Fullam-Stone; 2. Andrew Gee	1,323	0.59	+0.59
Liberty & Democracy	1. Lisa Milat; 2. Chris Textor	545	0.24	+0.24
Nuclear Disarmament	1. Michael Denborough; 2. Erica Denborough	446	0.20	+0.20
Total formal votes		225,321	98.30	+0.76
Informal votes		3,905	1.70	−0.76
Turnout		229,226	96.00	+0.79

==== 2004 ====
Elected	#	Senator	Party
2004	1	Kate Lundy	Labor
2004	2	Gary Humphries	Liberal

2004 Australian federal election: Senate, Australian Capital Territory
Party	Candidate	Votes	%	±%
Quota		70,436		
Labor	1. Kate Lundy (elected 1); 2. David Smith	86,855	41.10	−0.92
Liberal	1. Gary Humphries (elected 2); 2. Ian Morison	80,022	37.87	+3.57
Greens	1. Kerrie Tucker; 2. Roland Manderson	34,575	16.36	+9.14
Democrats	1. Rachael Jacobs; 2. Peter Bourne	4,528	2.14	−8.60
Christian Democrats	1. Tim Janes; 2. John Miller	3,294	1.56	−0.19
Progressive Alliance	1. Jeannette Jolley; 2. Ryan Deebank	1,147	0.54	+0.54
Independent	Dave Edwards	885	0.42	+0.42
Total formal votes		211,306	97.54	−0.12
Informal votes		5,325	2.46	+0.12
Turnout		216,631	95.16	−0.53

==== 2001 ====
Elected	#	Senator	Party
2001	1	Kate Lundy	Labor
2001	2	Margaret Reid	Liberal

2001 Australian federal election: Senate, Australian Capital Territory
Party	Candidate	Votes	%	±%
Quota		68,492		
Labor	1. Kate Lundy (elected 1); 2. Robin Poke	86,331	42.02	−1.0
Liberal	1. Margaret Reid (elected 2); 2. Bill Hanlon	70,475	34.30	+3.0
Democrats	1. Wayne Sievers; 2. Roslyn Dundas	22,072	10.74	−6.2
Greens	1. Gary Corr; 2. Felicity Fahey	14,825	7.22	+4.0
One Nation	1. Don Tarlinton; 2. Ted Tarlinton	4,485	2.18	−2.2
Christian Democrats	1. Ian McClure; 2. Tim Janes	3,602	1.25	+0.8
Independent	Ken Helm	3,580	1.74	+1.74
Citizens Electoral Council	James Arnold	104	0.05	+0.05
Total formal votes		205,474	97.66	−0.37
Informal votes		4,924	2.34	+0.37
Turnout		210,398	95.69	−0.62

=== Elections in the 1990s ===
==== 1998 ====
Elected	#	Senator	Party
1998
1998	1	Kate Lundy	Labor
1998	2	Margaret Reid	Liberal

1998 Australian federal election: Senate, Australian Capital Territory
Party	Candidate	Votes	%	±%
Quota		65,679		
Labor	1. Kate Lundy (elected 1); 2. Peter Conway	83,867	42.6	0.0
Liberal	1. Margaret Reid (elected 2); 2. Gayle Richards	61,385	31.2	−7.8
Democrats	1. Rick Farley; 2. Wayne Sievers	32,833	16.9	+6.7
One Nation	1. Estelle O'Brien; 2. Jeremy Leyland	9,621	4.8	+4.8
Greens	1. Deb Foskey; 2. Lesley Christian	6,385	3.2	−2.6
Independent	John Miller	923	0.5	+0.5
Women's Party	1. Annette Haridan; 2. Susanne Edwards	876	0.4	+0.4
Abolish Child Support	1. Peter Rogers; 2. Anthony Hardy	868	0.4	+0.4
Independent	Cec Harris	170	0.1	+0.1
Independent	Andrew Edgar	107	0.1	+0.1
Total formal votes		197,035	98.0	+0.5
Informal votes		3,952	2.0	−0.5
Turnout		200,987	96.3	+0.1

==== 1996 ====
Elected	#	Senator	Party
1996
1996	1	Kate Lundy	Labor
1996	2	Margaret Reid	Liberal

1996 Australian federal election: Senate, Australian Capital Territory
Party	Candidate	Votes	%	±%
Quota		64,020		
Labor	1. Kate Lundy (elected 1); 2. Peter Conway	81,866	42.6	−6.0
Liberal	1. Margaret Reid (elected 2); 2. Stephe Jitts	74,949	39.0	+4.0
Democrats	1. Peter Main; 2. Brent Blackburn	19,590	10.2	+3.3
Greens	1. Deb Foskey; 2. Jonathan Millar	11,297	5.8	−0.2
Call to Australia	1. John Miller; 2. James Liaw	2,901	1.5	+1.5
Independent	Fred Skerbic	1,454	0.8	+0.8
Independent	Bill Monaghan	597	0.3	+0.3
Independent	Joanne Clarke	454	0.2	+0.2
Independent	David Seaton	146	0.1	+0.1
Total formal votes		192,057	97.5	−0.9
Informal votes		4,860	2.5	+0.9
Turnout		196,917	96.2	−0.9

==== 1993 ====
Elected	#	Senator	Party
1993	1	Bob McMullan	Labor
1993	2	Margaret Reid	Liberal

1993 Australian federal election: Senate, Australian Capital Territory
Party	Candidate	Votes	%	±%
Quota		61,276		
Labor	1. Bob McMullan (elected 1); 2. Maureen Sheehan	89,380	48.6	+7.5
Liberal	1. Margaret Reid (elected 2); 2. Lucinda Spier	64,318	35.0	−1.0
Democrats	1. Domenic Mico; 2. Peter Main	12,656	6.9	−0.7
Greens	1. Kerrie Tucker; 2. David Turbayne	11,168	6.0	+2.7
Independent	Bernard Collaery	3,470	1.9	+1.9
Abolish Self Govt	1. Helen Miller; 2. Ute Ernst	1,708	0.9	+0.9
Natural Law	1. David Seaton; 2. Nanette Kerrison	733	0.4	+0.4
Independent	Arthur Burns	393	0.2	+0.2
Total formal votes		183,826	98.4	+0.8
Informal votes		2,988	1.6	−0.8
Turnout		186,814	97.1	+0.9

==== 1990 ====
Elected	#	Senator	Party
1990
1990	1	Bob McMullan	Labor
1990	2	Margaret Reid	Liberal

1990 Australian federal election, Senate, Australian Capital Territory
Party	Candidate	Votes	%	±%
Quota		53,891		
Labor	Bob McMullan (elected 1)	66,495	41.1	−8.8
Liberal	1. Margaret Reid (elected 2); 2. Roger Dace	58,082	36.0	+2.0
Democrats	1. Norm Sanders; 2. Jenny McLeod	28,510	17.6	+7.4
Greens	1. Hedley Rowe; 2. Michael Poole	5,288	3.3	+3.3
Nuclear Disarmament	1. Michael Denborough; 2. Jan Grech	2,117	1.3	−3.8
Independent	Maggie Kennedy	769	0.5	+0.5
Independent	Max Minius	312	0.2	+0.2
Independent	Ralph Schroder	98	0.1	+0.1
Total formal votes		161,671	97.6	−0.1
Informal votes		3,905	2.4	+0.1
Turnout		165,576	96.2	+1.7

=== Elections in the 1980s ===
==== 1987 ====
1987 Australian federal election: Senate, Australian Capital Territory
Party	Candidate	Votes	%	±%
Quota		50,047		
Labor	1. Susan Ryan (elected 1); 2. Barry Reid	74,876	49.9	+5.5
Liberal	1. Margaret Reid (elected 2); 2. Bill Stefaniak	51,090	34.0	+2.1
Democrats	1. Andrew Freeman; 2. Geoff Quayle	15,353	10.2	+1.0
Nuclear Disarmament	1. Michael Denborough; 2. Margaret Matthews	7,719	5.1	−5.2
Independent	Leonard Munday	433	0.3	+0.3
Independent	David Ash	433	0.3	+0.3
Independent	John Murray	234	0.2	+0.2
Total formal votes		150,138	97.7	+1.1
Informal votes		3,672	2.3	−1.1
Turnout		153,810	94.5	+0.6

#	Senator	Party
1	Susan Ryan	Labor
2	Margaret Reid	Liberal

==== 1984 ====
Elected	#	Senator	Party
1984
1984	1	Susan Ryan	Labor
1984	2	Margaret Reid	Liberal

1984 Australian federal election: Senate, Australian Capital Territory
Party	Candidate	Votes	%	±%
Quota		45,608		
Labor	1. Susan Ryan (elected 1); 2. Hugh Saddler	60,763	44.4	−10.9
Liberal	1. Margaret Reid (elected 2); 2. David Walters	43,699	31.9	+0.2
Nuclear Disarmament	1. John Conway; 2. Jan Barratt	14,025	10.3	+10.3
Democrats	1. John Hatton; 2. Julia Knyvett	12,571	9.2	−2.7
Referendum First	1. Allan Nelson; 2. Tony Spagnolo	5,808	4.2	+4.2
Total formal votes		136,866	96.6	−0.1
Informal votes		4,813	3.4	+0.1
Turnout		141,679	94.2	−1.8

==== 1983 ====
1983 Australian federal election: Senate, Australian Capital Territory
Party	Candidate	Votes	%	±%
Quota		42,416		
Labor	1. Susan Ryan (elected 1); 2. Marc Robinson	70,433	55.4	+4.7
Liberal	1. Margaret Reid (elected 2); 2. John Munro	40,292	31.7	−5.4
Democrats	1. Charles Price; 2. Dimmen de Graaff	15,141	11.9	+3.3
Deadly Serious	Ian Rout	955	0.8	+0.8
Independent	Brian Scott	425	0.3	+0.3
Total formal votes		127,246	96.7	−0.5
Informal votes		4,287	3.3	+0.5
Turnout		131,533	95.7	+1.4

#	Senator	Party
1	Susan Ryan	Labor
2	Margaret Reid	Liberal

==== 1980 ====
Elected	#	Senator	Party
1980
1980	1	Susan Ryan	Labor
1980	2	John Knight	Liberal

1980 Australian federal election: Senate, Australian Capital Territory
Party	Candidate	Votes	%	±%
Quota		41,569		
Labor	1. Susan Ryan (elected 1); 2. John Langmore	63,280	50.8	+7.6
Liberal	2. John Knight (elected 2); 2. David Adams	46,267	37.1	−1.3
Democrats	1. John Filler; 2. John Morgan	10,663	8.5	−4.3
Jobless Action Community Campaign	1. Neville Curtis; 2. Jacqueline Flitcroft	4,001	3.2	+3.2
Independent	Joseph Marks	493	0.4	+0.4
Total formal votes		124,704	97.2	+6.9
Informal votes		3,558	2.8	−6.9
Turnout		128,262	94.3	−1.3

== See also ==
- List of senators from the Australian Capital Territory
