= Mark Robinson =

Mark Robinson may refer to:

== Entertainment ==
- Mark Robinson (musician) (born 1967), American musician and founder of Teenbeat Records
- Mark Edwin Robinson (born 1980), American film director and screenwriter
- Mark Robinson (drummer) (born 1989), American drummer and founder of Storyboard Records
- Mark Robinson (Friends), a fictional character in the American sitcom Friends

== Politics ==
- Mark Robinson (English politician) (born 1946), former British Conservative politician
- Mark Robinson (Northern Ireland politician) (born 1959), former Democratic Unionist Party Northern Ireland Assembly Member
- Mark Robinson (Australian politician) (born 1963), member of the Queensland Legislative Assembly
- Mark Robinson (American politician) (born 1968), Lieutenant Governor of North Carolina from 2021 to 2025
- Mark Allan Robinson (born 1975), Canadian political activist

== Sports ==
=== American football ===
- Mark Robinson (safety) (born 1962), American football player, a former NFL safety
- Mark Robinson (linebacker) (born 1999), American football player, an NFL linebacker

=== Association football ===
- Mark Robinson (football manager) (born 1965), English football manager
- Mark Robinson (footballer, born 1968), retired footballer
- Mark Robinson (footballer, born 1981), English professional footballer

=== Cricket ===
- Mark Robinson (cricketer, born 1966), English cricketer for Northamptonshire, Yorkshire, Sussex and Canterbury
- Mark Robinson (Shropshire cricketer) (born 1984), English cricketer for Shropshire

=== Rugby (union and league) ===
- Mark Robinson (rugby league) (born 1964), Australian rugby league footballer
- Mark Robinson (rugby union, born 1974), New Zealand rugby union centre, and later rugby executive
- Mark Robinson (rugby, born 1975), New Zealand rugby union scrum half (also briefly played rugby league)

=== Other sportspeople ===
- Mark Robinson (martial artist) (born 1963), South African Martial Artist and Powerlifter

== Other ==
- Mark Robinson (Royal Navy officer) (1722–1799), English officer
- Mark P. Robinson (1852–1915), Hawaiian business magnate and politician
- Mark Robinson (meteorologist) (born 1973), Canadian television meteorologist and storm chaser
- Mark Robinson (journalist), Australian chief football writer of the Herald Sun
- Mark P. Robinson (editor), American journalist and actor

== See also ==
- Marc Robinson (politician) (born 1953), former Australian politician
- Marc Robinson (born 1968), Indian actor and model
- Marcus Robinson (disambiguation)
