= List of the first women holders of political offices in Oceania =

This is a list of political offices which have been held by a woman, with details of the first woman holder of each office. It is ordered by the countries in Oceania and by dates of appointment. Please observe that this list is meant to contain only the first woman to hold of a political office, and not all the female holders of that office.

== Australia ==
- Local government councillor – Grace Benny – 1919
- Member of a state parliament – Edith Cowan (Western Australia) – 1921
- Mayor – Lilian Fowler – 1938
- Member of the House of Representatives – Dame Enid Lyons – 1943
- Member of the Senate – Dorothy Tangney – 1943
- Member of Federal Cabinet – Dame Enid Lyons (Vice-President of the Executive Council) – 1949
- Member of a state or territory cabinet – Florence Cardell-Oliver (Western Australia, Minister for Health) – 1949
- Member of the federal ministry (with a portfolio) – Dame Annabelle Rankin (Minister for Housing) – 1966
- Leader of the government in an upper house – Phyllis Benjamin (Tasmania) – 1968
- Member of Federal Cabinet (with a portfolio) – Margaret Guilfoyle (Minister for Education) – 1975
- Lord Mayor – Joy Cummings (Newcastle) – 1975
- Leader of a parliamentary party – Elisabeth Kirkby (Australian Democrats, New South Wales) – 1981
- Leader of a federal parliamentary party – Janine Haines (Australian Democrats) – 1986
- Speaker of the House of Representatives – Joan Child – 1986
- Head of a state or territory government – Rosemary Follett (Australian Capital Territory) – 1989
- Chief Minister – Rosemary Follett (Australian Capital Territory) – 1989
- Leader of a state or territory opposition – Rosemary Follett (Australian Capital Territory) – 1989
- State Premier – Carmen Lawrence (Western Australia) – 1990
- State Governor – Dame Roma Mitchell (South Australia) – 1991
- President of the Senate – Margaret Reid – 1996
- Leadership position in a major party – Jenny Macklin (Deputy Leader, Labor Party) – 2001
- Deputy Prime Minister – Julia Gillard – 2007
- Governor-General – Quentin Bryce – 2008
- Leader of a major party – Julia Gillard (Leader, Labor Party) – 2010
- Prime Minister – Julia Gillard – 2010
- Foreign Minister – Julie Bishop – 2013

=== Australian Capital Territory ===
- Elected Member of the Australian Capital Territory Advisory Council – Mary Steel Stevenson – 1951
- Member of the Australian Capital Territory House of Assembly – Ros Kelly, Susan Ryan and Maureen Worsley – 1975
- Minority Leader of the Australian Capital Territory House of Assembly - Maurene Horder – 1983
- Chief Minister of the Australian Capital Territory – Rosemary Follett – 1989
- Leader of the Opposition – Rosemary Follett – 1989
- Speaker of the Australian Capital Territory Legislative Assembly – Roberta McRae – 1992
- Deputy Chief Minister of the Australian Capital Territory – Katy Gallagher – 2006

=== New South Wales ===
- Member of the New South Wales Legislative Assembly – Millicent Preston-Stanley – 1925
- Member of the New South Wales Legislative Council – Catherine Green and Ellen Webster – 1931
- Cabinet Minister – Janice Crosio – 1984 (She became the Minister for Natural Resources.)
- President of the New South Wales Legislative Council – Virginia Chadwick – 1998
- Leader of the Opposition – Kerry Chikarovski – 1999
- Governor of New South Wales – Marie Bashir – 2001
- Lord Mayor of Sydney – Lucy Turnbull – 2003
- Deputy Premier of New South Wales – Carmel Tebbutt – 2008
- Premier of New South Wales – Kristina Keneally – 2009
- Speaker of the New South Wales Legislative Assembly – Shelley Hancock – 2011

=== Northern Territory ===
- Member of the Northern Territory Legislative Council – Lyn Berlowitz – 1960
- Member of the Northern Territory Legislative Assembly – Liz Andrew, Dawn Lawrie – 1974
- Lord Mayor of Darwin – Ella Stack – 1975
- Cabinet Minister – Noel Padgham-Purich – 1983 (She became the Minister for Housing and Conservation.)
- Leader of the Opposition – Maggie Hickey – 1996
- Speaker of the Northern Territory Legislative Assembly – Loraine Braham – 1997
- Chief Minister of the Northern Territory – Clare Martin – 2001
- Deputy Chief Minister of the Northern Territory – Marion Scrymgour – 2007
- Administrator of the Northern Territory – Sally Thomas – 2011

=== Queensland ===
- Member of the Queensland Legislative Assembly – Irene Longman – 1929
- Lord Mayor of Brisbane – Sallyanne Atkinson – 1985
- Cabinet Minister – Yvonne Chapman – 1986 (She became the Minister for Welfare Services, Youth and Ethnic Affairs.)
- Governor of Queensland – Leneen Forde – 1992
- Deputy Premier of Queensland – Joan Sheldon – 1996
- Premier of Queensland – Anna Bligh – 2007
- Leader of the Opposition – Annastacia Palaszczuk – 2012
- Speaker of the Legislative Assembly – Fiona Simpson – 2012

=== South Australia ===
- Member of the South Australian House of Assembly – Joyce Steele – 1959
- Member of the South Australian Legislative Council – Jessie Cooper – 1959
- Cabinet Minister – Joyce Steele (Minister for Education) – 1968
- Lord Mayor of Adelaide – Wendy Chapman – 1983
- President of the South Australian Legislative Council – Anne Levy – 1986
- Governor of South Australia – Dame Roma Mitchell – 1991
- Leader of the Opposition – Isobel Redmond – 2009
- Speaker of the South Australian House of Assembly – Lyn Breuer – 2010

=== Tasmania ===
- Member of the Tasmanian Legislative Council – Margaret McIntyre – 1948
- Members of the Tasmanian House of Assembly – Amelia Best, Mabel Miller – 1955
- Cabinet Minister – Gillian James – 1980 (She became the Minister for Public and Mental Health, Consumer Affairs and Administrative Services.)
- Party Leader – Christine Milne (Tasmanian Greens) – 1993
- Leader of the Opposition – Sue Napier – 1999
- President of the Tasmanian Legislative Council – Sue Smith – 2008
- Premier of Tasmania – Lara Giddings – 2011
- Speaker of the Tasmanian House of Assembly – Elise Archer – 2014
- Governor of Tasmania – Kate Warner – 2014

=== Victoria ===
- Member of the Victorian Legislative Assembly – Millie Peacock – 1933
- Member of the Victorian Legislative Council – Gracia Baylor – 1979
- Cabinet Minister – Pauline Toner (Minister for Community Welfare Services) – 1982
- Lord Mayor of Melbourne – Alexis Ord – 1986
- Deputy Premier of Victoria – Joan Kirner – 1989
- Premier of Victoria – Joan Kirner – 1990
- Leader of the Opposition – Joan Kirner – 1992
- Speaker of the Victorian Legislative Assembly – Judy Maddigan – 2003
- President of the Victorian Legislative Council – Monica Gould – 2003
- Governor of Victoria – Linda Dessau – 2015

=== Western Australia ===
- Member of the Western Australian Legislative Assembly – Edith Cowan – 1921
- Member of the Western Australian Legislative Council – Ruby Hutchison – 1954
- Cabinet Minister – Florence Cardell-Oliver (Minister for Health) – 1947
- Premier of Western Australia – Carmen Lawrence – 1990
- Leader of the Opposition – Carmen Lawrence – 1993
- Lord Mayor of Perth – Lisa Scaffidi – 2007
- Governor of Western Australia – Kerry Sanderson – 2014
- Deputy Premier of Western Australia — Liza Harvey – 2016
- President of the Western Australian Legislative Council – Kate Doust – 2017

== Cook Islands ==
- Member of Parliament – Fanaura Kingstone – 1983
- Minister of Internal Affairs and Postmistress General – Fanaura Kingstone – 1983

== Fiji ==
- Members of Parliament: Losalini Raravuya Dovi, Loloma Livingston, and Irene Jai Narayan – 1966
- Minister of Culture – Litia Cakobau – 1987

== French Polynesia ==
- Minister of Social Affairs, Housing and Unity – Huguette Hong-Kiou – 1982

== Kiribati ==
Gilbert and Ellice Islands (British colony):

- Member of the House of Assembly – Tekarei Russell – 1971
- Member of Cabinet (Minister of Health) – Tekarei Russell – 1975

Kiribati:

- Vice President – Teima Onorio – 2003
- Speaker of the House of Assembly – Tangariki Reete – 2020
- Member of the House of Assembly representing Maiana island – Ruta Teretia Babo – 2024

== Marshall Islands ==
- Senator (i.e., member of the Nitijeļā, the unicameral legislature) – Evelyn Konou – 1978
- Member of Cabinet – Evelyn Konou, as Minister for Health Services and the Environment – 1993
- President – Hilda Heine – 2016

== Federated States of Micronesia ==
- Member of Congress – Perpetua Sappa Konman - 2021

== Nauru ==
- Member of Parliament – Ruby Dediya (subsequently known as Ruby Thoma) – 1986
- Member of Cabinet – Ruby Dediya – 1996 (as Minister for Finance)

== New Zealand ==
- Mayor – Elizabeth Yates – 1894
- Member of Parliament – Elizabeth McCombs – 1933
- Cabinet Minister – Mabel Howard – 1947
- Mayor of Auckland City – Dame Catherine Tizard – 1983
- Governor-General – Dame Catherine Tizard – 1990
- Deputy Prime Minister – Helen Clark – 1989
- Mayor of Christchurch – Vicki Buck – 1989
- Minister of Finance – Ruth Richardson – 1990
- Mayor of Wellington – Fran Wilde – 1992
- Leader of the Opposition – Helen Clark – 1993
- Prime Minister – Jenny Shipley – 1997
- Attorney-General – Margaret Wilson – 1999
- Speaker of the House of Representatives – Margaret Wilson – 2005
- Minister of Justice - Annette King - 2007-2008

== Palau ==
- Minister of Administration and Budget – Sandra Pierantozzi – 1989
- Foreign Minister – Sandra Pierantozzi – 2009

== Papua New Guinea ==
- Member of the Legislative Council – Doris Booth – 1951
- Member of Parliament – Dame Josephine Abaijah – 1972
- Cabinet Minister – Nahau Rooney, as Minister for Justice – 1977

== Samoa ==
- Member of the Legislative Assembly – Faimaala Filipo – 1970
- Minister of Culture, Youth and Sports – Fiame Naomi Mata'afa – 1991
- Minister of Justice and Courts Administration - Fiame Naomi Mata'afa - 2011

== Solomon Islands ==
- Member of the Legislative Council – Lilly Ogatina Poznanski – 1965
- Member of Parliament – Hilda Kari – 1989
- Member of Cabinet – Hilda Kari – 1993

== Tonga ==
- Member of the Legislative Assembly – Princess Mele Siuʻilikutapu – 1975
- Cabinet of Tonga – ‘Alisi Taumoepeau – 2006
- Attorney General and Minister of Justice - 'Alisi Taumoepeau (2006)

== Tuvalu ==
- Member of Parliament – Naama Maheu Latasi – 1989 (She became the country's first female Cabinet Minister upon becoming the Minister for Health)
- Governor-General – Temukisa Auina Penehuro Hauma – 2026

== Vanuatu ==
- Member of Parliament – Hilda Lini and Maria Crowby – 1987
- Member of Cabinet – Hilda Lini, as Minister for Rural Water Supply and Health – 1991
- Minister of Justice, Culture and Women - Motarilavoa Hilda Lini - 1996

== See also ==
- List of elected and appointed female heads of state and government
- List of the first openly LGBT holders of political offices
