= 1974 Australian Capital Territory election =

Territory election in Australia

- 28 September 1974
- Turnout: 92.0%

	First party	Second party	Third party
			AUS
Leader	Jim Leedman	Gordon Walsh	Ivor Vivian
Party	Liberal	Labor	Australia
Leader's seat	Canberra (won seat)	Canberra (won seat)	Fraser (won seat)
Seats won	7	4	1
Percentage	30.8%	22.2%	4.6%
Swing	▲17.3	▼6.0

The 1974 Australian Capital Territory election was held on 28 September 1974 to elect all 18 members of the Legislative Assembly, the main elected representative body of the Australian Capital Territory (ACT). This was the first election for the Assembly, replacing the Advisory Council, although elected members did not start sitting until 1975.

The election saw a swing of almost 20% towards the Liberal Party, while Labor lost around 6% of its vote compared to the 1970 Advisory Council election.

== Background ==
As preparations were still being made for the granting of self-government to the ACT, the House served a largely advisory role, with most powers over the ACT still lying in the hands of the relevant federal minister through the life of the Assembly.

Nine members were elected by single transferable vote proportional representation from each of the ACT's two federal House of Representatives divisions, making 18 in total. Independent members who vacated mid-term were replaced by recounting their original votes to their next preferences to choose a runner-up. Members endorsed by a political party were replaced by a nominee of that party.

== Results ==
=== Vote totals ===
Legislative Assembly (STV/PR)
Party	Votes	%	Swing	Seats	Change
Liberal		30.8	+17.3	7	
Labor		22.2	−6.0	4	
Australia		4.6		2	
ACT Women Voters				0	Steady
Independents				5	
Formal votes		93.0			
Informal votes		7.0			
Total		100.0			
Registered voters / turnout		92.0			

=== Distribution of seats ===
Electorate	Seats held
Canberra	
Fraser	

Labor
Liberal
Australia
Independent

== See also ==
- 1974 ACT Liberal Party leadership election
