= Marcus Robinson =

Marcus Robinson may refer to:

- Marcus Robinson (American football) (born 1975), former American football player
- Marcus Robinson (artist) (born 1959), artist and documentarian
- Marcus Robinson (prisoner) (born 1973), former death row prisoner who had his sentence commuted to life imprisonment following a landmark case in South California, U.S.
- Marc Robinson (politician) (Marcus Laurence Robinson, born 1953), former Australian politician

== See also ==
- Mark Robinson (disambiguation)
