= Peter Hughes (Australian politician) =

Australian urologist and politician

Dr Peter Hughes OAM MLA

Member of the Australian Capital Territory Legislative Assembly for Canberra
- In office 28 September 1974 – 2 June 1979

Leader of the ACT Liberal Party
- In office 30 October 1974 – 3 February 1977
- Preceded by: Jim Leedman
- Succeeded by: Jim Leedman

ACT Liberal Party Electoral Conference President
- In office 1972–1974
- Preceded by: Arthur Kenyon
- Succeeded by: Tony Selmes

Personal details
- Born: Peter Dalton Hughes; 28 July 1932 (age 94) Wagga Wagga, New South Wales, Australia
- Party: Liberal (1969–1977)
- Spouse: Ellen Hughes (m. 1958)
- Children: 8
- Occupation: Urologist (retired 2008)

Peter Dalton Hughes OAM (born 28 July 1932) is an Australian retired urologist and former politician who served as the leader of the ACT Liberal Party from 1974 until he left the party in 1977. He is currently the president of the Regional Medical Specialists Association (RMSA).

== Early life ==
Hughes was born in Wagga Wagga, New South Wales, and lived on his family's farm in the small town of Junee Reefs, where he attended a one-teacher primary school. He attended St Joseph's College in the Sydney suburb of Hunter's Hill.

Studying medicine, he completed his junior resident year at Mater Hospital in Newcastle, where he met his future wife, Ellen Hughes (no relation). After gradulating from the University of Sydney, he spent six years in England training in general and urological surgery. He married Ellen Hughes at Shepherd's Bush, London, in July 1958.

Hughes and his wife returned to Australia four years later with their three (eventually eight) children, arriving in Canberra in March 1962.

== Career ==
In 1969, Hughes joined the Liberal Party. He was also a founding member of the Calvary John James Hospital in March 1970.

=== Federal candidacy ===
At the 1972 federal election, Hughes was chosen by the Liberals as their candidate for the electorate of Australian Capital Territory, and stepped down as a director of John James Hospital. He had a 5.7% swing towards him on a two-party-preferred (TPP) basis, but was still easily defeated by incumbent Labor MP Kep Enderby.

Hughes contested the 1974 federal election in the newly-formed federal division of Canberra. Despite a 13.4% swing on first preferences and a 9.5% TPP swing, he was still comfortably defeated by Enderby.

During this time, Hughes was the ACT Liberal Electoral Conference president.

=== Legislative Assembly ===
Later that year, Hughes contested the 1974 election for the newly-formed ACT Legislative Assembly (later House of Assembly) as a Liberal candidate. He was elected as one of nine members for the division of Canberra, and following the election, won a caucus vote to become the leader of the ACT Liberal Party.

On 3 January 1977, Hughes resigned as leader and from the Liberal Party to sit as an independent. Hughes stated he felt he could better serve the ACT if he was not a member of a political party. He was replaced by Jim Leedman at a leadership election later that month. Hughes later served as the chairman of the Legislative Assembly's Standing Committee on Housing and Welfare in 1978 and 1979.

Hughes sought re-election as an independent at the 1979 election, but was defeated. Throughout his time in the Legislative Assembly, he voted in 639 divisions, the second-most of any member (behind only Liberal MLA Greg Cornwell).

== Later life ==
Hughes served as the president of the Capital Territory Group of the Australian Medical Association (AMA) from 1984 until 1986, and has been a member of the AMA for more than 50 years. He continued in practicing as a urologist until retiring at the end of 2008.

In 2014, he was awarded a Medal of the Order of Australia (OAM) "for service to medicine, to a range of professional associations, and to the community".
