= Division of Fraser =

Division of Fraser may refer to:

- Division of Fraser (Australian Capital Territory), a former federal electoral division located in the Australian Capital Territory
- Division of Fraser (Victoria), a current federal electoral division located in Victoria
- Division of Fraser (Australian Capital Territory House of Assembly), a former territorial electoral division located in the Australian Capital Territory
