= 1979 Australian Capital Territory election =

1979 Australian Capital Territory general election
- 2 June 1979
- Turnout: 90.0% (▼2.0)

	First party	Second party
Leader	Peter Vallee	Jim Leedman
Party	Labor	Liberal
Leader since	January 1977
Leader's seat	Fraser	Canberra
Seats won	8	4
Seat change	▲4	▼3
Percentage	37.4%	18.5%
Swing	▲15.2	▼12.3
	Third party	Fourth party
	DEM	FAM
Leader	Gordon Walsh	Bev Cains
Party	Democrats	Family Team
Leader's seat	Canberra	Canberra (won seat)
Last election	Did not contest	Did not contest
Seats before	1	0
Seats won	2	1
Seat change	▲2	▲3
Percentage	6.5%
Swing	▲6.5

The 1979 Australian Capital Territory election was held on 2 June 1979 to elect all 18 members of the House of Assembly, the main elected representative body of the Australian Capital Territory (ACT). This was the first election for the House after it had been renamed from Legislative Assembly.

The election saw a swing of 15% towards the Labor Party, while the conservative Family Team won its first seat. The Australian Democrats also contested for the first time, winning two seats.

== Background ==
As preparations were still being made for the granting of self-government to the ACT, the House served a largely advisory role, with most powers over the ACT still lying in the hands of the relevant federal minister through the life of the Assembly.

Nine members were elected by single transferable vote proportional representation from each of the ACT's two federal House of Representatives divisions, making 18 in total. Independent members who vacated mid-term were replaced by recounting their original votes to their next preferences to choose a runner-up. Members endorsed by a political party were replaced by a nominee of that party.

== Results ==
=== Vote totals ===
House of Assembly (STV/PR)
Party	Votes	%	Swing	Seats	Change
Labor		37.4	+15.2	8	▲4
Liberal		18.5	–12.3	4	▼3
Democrats		6.5	+6.5	2	▲2
Family Team				1	▲1
Unemployed Workers Union				0	Steady
Independents				3	▼1
Formal votes		90.0	–2.0		
Informal votes		10.0	+7.0		
Total		100.0			
Registered voters / turnout		90.0	–2.0		

=== Distribution of seats ===
Electorate	Seats held
Canberra	
Fraser	

Labor
Liberal
Democrats
Family Team
Independent
