= Barry Reid (disambiguation) =

Barry Reid was a politician.

Barry Reid may also refer to:

People

- Barry Reid, author, e.g. of the book The Paper Trip, mentioned in Unsolved Mysteries, season 3
- Barry Reid, coach of New South Wales Waratahs (field hockey)

Fictional entities

- Barry Reid, Scrubs character, brother of Elliot Reid

== See also ==
- Barry Reed (disambiguation)
