= Betty Hocking =

Australian politician (1928–2017)

Betty Ann Hocking (13 March 1928 – 17 December 2017) was an Australian politician. She was a Family Team member of the Australian Capital Territory House of Assembly for Canberra from 1982 to 1986.

Hocking was adopted as a baby and raised in country South Australia in what the Australian Women's Register describes as a "dysfunctional home", where she "experienced difficult and stressful formative years". She was educated at Laura Primary School, Gladstone High School, and Miss Mann's Business College. She moved to Canberra in 1944, and was a stenographer in the public service until 1946. She lectured at the Canberra Technical College, and managed Canberra's first secretarial agency from 1957 to 1967, originally running it out of her home. In 1981, she opened a Christian bookshop and drop-in centre.

She was heavily involved in conservative politics in the Australian Capital Territory, serving as the ACT co-ordinator of anti-feminist group Women Who Want To Be Women, president of the Canberra branch of the Australian Family Association, and being involved with the National Alliance for Christian Leadership. In 1982, she was elected to the House of Assembly as the second representative of the conservative Family Team minor party, joining Bev Cains who had been elected in 1979. A vehement opponent of the Sex Discrimination Act 1984, she was quoted as stating "Is there no-one who can see that the women who hate men are castrating them with their sex discrimination Bills and making them eunuchs in their own kingdoms?" and "Delilah cut off Samson's hair and made him her slave. The Sex Discrimination Bill cuts off far more than that." She was also a strong supporter of Lindy Chamberlain, founding the National Freedom Council as a co-ordinating body for her defence, and setting up a Plea for Justice committee in the ACT.

The ACT House of Assembly was abolished in 1986 in preparation for electoral reforms that would eventually result in self-government and the creation of the current ACT Legislative Assembly. She did not contest the 1989 election for the new Legislative Assembly, and subsequently moved to Queensland.

Hocking died in Canberra in 2017, aged 89.
