= Ivor Vivian =

Australian politician

Ivor Francis Vivian (born 1932) is an Australian former politician.

Vivian was born in Newton Abbot, Devon, England in 1932. From 1969 to 1998, he was the foundation principal lecturer in mathematics at the Canberra College of Advanced Education, renamed in 1990 as the University of Canberra. In 1995 he was awarded a 25-year service pin.

In 1973, he was appointed to Australian Capital Territory Advisory Council.

In 1975, he was elected to the newly created Australian Capital Territory Legislative Assembly as one of the nine members representing the electorate of Fraser for the centrist Australia Party. He was one of two Australia Party members elected to the Legislative Assembly, the other being Maureen Worsley, who was elected as a member for the electorate for Canberra. Gordon Walsh was a Labor member of the Assembly. In 1977 he resigned from Labor, and from the Assembly, and joined the Australia Party. Vivian and Walsh both joined the Australian Democrats on its formation later in 1977. Worsley sat out the rest of her term as an independent.

Vivian and Walsh were both elected to the renamed House of Assembly in 1979, but Vivian failed to be re-elected in 1982, leaving Walsh as the only remaining Democrat. He served as the deputy president of the Assembly and deputy chairman of committees. He also served on the ACT Interim Schools Authority, Road Safety Council, Third Party Premiums Committee and was chairman of the Police Liaison Committee. The House of Assembly was abolished in 1986, and replaced in 1989 with the Australian Capital Territory Legislative Assembly. Neither Vivian nor Walsh stood for election to the new Legislative Assembly.

Vivian is a priest of the Liberal Catholic Church, and was vicar of St Thomas' church in the Canberra suburb of Melba.

He was involved in the establishment of Radio 1RPH, a radio station for people with a print disability.
