= Maureen Worsley =

Australian politician

Maureen Gertrude Theresa Worsley (née Anderson; 1937–2001) was an Australian politician.

Worsley was born in Burton-on-Trent in Staffordshire in England in 1937. In 1970 she married Mike Worsley and later that year migrated to Canberra.

She was elected to the new Legislative Assembly as a member for Canberra in 1975 for the centrist Australia Party.

When most of the Australia Party merged into the new Australian Democrats in 1977, Worsley declined to join the new party, and sat as an independent until the 1979 election. She was an independent candidate for the electorate of Canberra in the 1982 election for the House of Assembly, which by then had replaced the earlier Legislative Assembly.

Worsley was active in abortion rights protests in the 1970s, and was an active member of the Women's Tent Embassy outside Parliament House in Canberra protesting against abortion laws in 1973. One of the leaders of that protest was Beryl Henderson, who founded the Canberra Women's Refuge in 1975. The immediate prompt for the Women's Tent Embassy was to support the Private Member’s Bill proposed by MPs David McKenzie and Tony Lamb, the Medical Practice Clarification Bill, which, if it had passed, would have allowed abortion in the Australian Capital Territory.

Worsley died in 2001 of emphysema.

== See also ==
- List of the first women holders of political offices in Oceania
