= Joan Taggart =

Australian politician

Joan Margaret Taggart (2 April 1917 – 3 January 2003) was an Australian politician who was a member of the Australian Capital Territory House of Assembly from 1982 to 1986. She is notable for having been the first woman to hold a national office in the Australian Labor Party.

== Early life ==
Taggart was born in Sydney and moved to Canberra in 1964. She worked in administration at the Australian National University and as an executive assistant for the Pipeline Authority.

== Political career ==
Taggart was elected junior vice-president of the ALP in 1979. In doing so, she became the first woman to hold a national office bearer post in the Labor Party.

She was elected to the Australian Capital Territory House of Assembly for the electorate of Canberra in 1982, and was Deputy Speaker in her term of office. In 1984 she was awarded the Medal of the Order of Australia. The House of Assembly ceased to exist in 1986, and Taggart did not stand for election to the replacement assembly in 1989.

== Personal life ==
By the time she stood for election in 1982, Taggart was a widow. She died in 2003, aged 85.
