= Barry Reed =

Barry Reed may refer to:

- Barry Reed (author) (1927–2002), American trial lawyer and bestselling author
- Barry Reed (cricketer) (1937–2024), English cricketer

== See also ==
- Barry Reid (disambiguation)
