= Evelyn Konou =

Marshallese politician (1948–2020)

Evelyn Konou (11 January 1948 – 1 December 2020) was a Marshallese politician. She was a member of the Legislature of the Marshall Islands from 1993 to 1997.

Konou was born in Majuro, the capital of the Republic of the Marshall Islands. From 1993 to 1997, Konou represented the Jaluit electorate in the Marshall Islands Parliament, the Nitijela. She was Minister of Health Services and Environment in 1993 and Minister for Education from 1994 to 1997. After retiring from politics, Konou served as the Marshall Islands Ambassador to Taiwan, and as principal of Delap Elementary school in Majuro. Konou has also held the position of Secretary-General of the Marshall Islands National Commission for UNESCO.
