= Bill Pye =

Australian politician

Thomas Wilbur Washington "Bill" Pye (3 September 1912 – 3 October 1996) was an Australian politician.

== Early life ==
Bill Pye was born in Harden, New South Wales, on 3 September 1912. He was the 3 x great grandson of Third Fleet convicts John Pye (who arrived on the Britannia) and Mary Phillips (who arrived on the Mary Ann) and who were married in Parramatta in 1791.

He served with the Australian Military Forces in World War II. After the War, he settled in Canberra with his family, and joined the Commonwealth Public Service. He retired in 1972.

== Political career ==
Pye was appointed an independent member of the Australian Capital Territory Advisory Council in 1960, but was not re-elected in the 1961 election. He was elected in 1964 and 1967. In the 1967–1970 Council, he was the Deputy Chair.

He was appointed to the Advisory Council's successor the Legislative Assembly in 1978 following the death of Allan Fraser, and sat until 1979. He was then elected to the renamed House of Assembly in 1979, sitting until 1982. He was a candidate in the 1982 election, in the electorate of Fraser, but was not re-elected.

At the first self-government election to the new Australian Capital Territory Legislative Assembly in 1989 he was an independent candidate, but was again unsuccessful.

He was appointed MBE in the 1979 New Year Honours.

== Personal life ==
He died in 1996. His wife Betty died in 2014.

== Legacy ==
The Bill Pye Park was named after him in 2009, in the Canberra suburb of Ainslie.
