= Revel In Romance =

American pop rock band

Revel in Romance
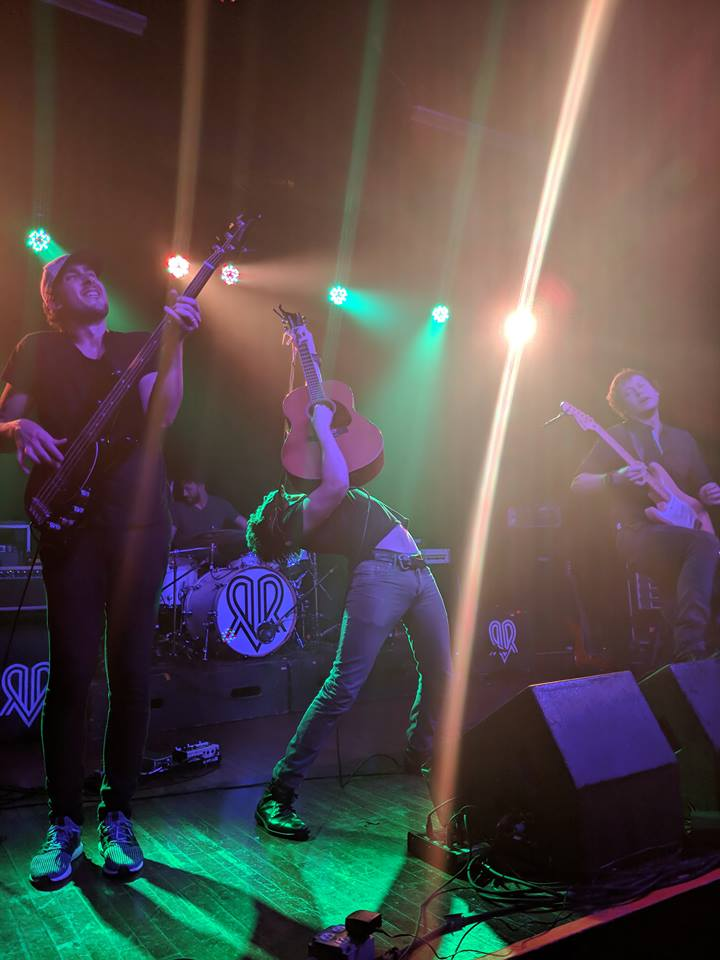
- Revel in Romance performing in Atlanta in 2018

Background information
- Origin: Atlanta, Georgia, United States
- Genres: Pop; pop rock
- Years active: 2013–present
- Label: Independent
- Members: Saxony Raine; Devin Maier; Parker Rehklau; Remington Rehklau; Mark Robinson
- Website: revelinromance.com

Revel in Romance is an American pop rock band out of Atlanta, Georgia, United States. It consists of lead vocalist Saxony Raine, lead guitarist Devin Maier, rhythm guitarist Parker Rehklau, bassist Remington Rehklau, and drummer Mark Robinson.

== History ==
One of the members, Mark Robinson attended Eastern Christian High School from 2002 to 2004 with Kevin Jonas of the Jonas Brothers. From 2004 to 2008, Robinson played in a variety of Christian music scenes in the Chicago area, even playing with his own band around town. In 2009, he played with Kenny Chesney and Keith Urban at Soldier Field during their 2009 Summer Tour. Opening artists included; LeAnn Rimes, Gary Allan, and Lady Antebellum.

In early 2013, Revel in Romance began writing, rehearsing and playing as an acoustic trio with lead vocalist Saxony Raine, rhythm guitarist Parker and lead guitarist Devin. The trio released their first acoustic EP, Stripped, in 2014 with producer Ralph Cacciurri. Before too long, they decided on a fuller sound and added bassist Remington and Mark on drums.

In May 2014, they played their first full band show as Revel in Romance. In February 2015, their debut single, "Little Love", produced by Jan Smith and Shawn Grove, was released as an introduction to their new sound.

Their debut EP Right and Wrong was released in 2016, also with producer Jan Smith, Jesse Owen Astin and Shawn Grove, and music video release of their single "Echoes" set them on a path to perform throughout the United States playing SXSW, Warped Tour, Summerfest, SweetWater 420 Fest, Athfest, Mesa Music Fest and more. They made their television debut in February 2018 with 11 Alive on NBC.

In 2018, they released "When You Left", the newest single leading up to their EP 'Smoke and Mirrors' released in 2019.

Singles "For a Minute" was released in 2020 and "Knowing You" in 2021.

== Discography ==
Title	Year of Release	Label
Stripped (EP)	2014	Independent Release
"Little Love" (Single)	2015	Independent Release
Right and Wrong (EP)	2016	Independent Release
"When You Left" (Single)	2018	Independent Release
