= Division of Canberra (Australian Capital Territory House of Assembly) =

Coordinates: 35.2817°S 149.1311°E

The division of Canberra was one of the two electorates of the unicameral Australian Capital Territory House of Assembly. It elected 9 members in 1975 and 1979, and 10 members in 1982. It was named for the city of Canberra, Australia's national capital, and included the districts of Tuggeranong, Weston Creek and Woden Valley, along with the rest of the ACT south of the Molonglo River and Lake Burley Griffin.

== Members ==
Year	Member	Member	Member	Member	Member	Member	Member	Member	Member	Member
1975	Gordon Walsh (Labor)	Ros Kelly (Labor)	Ian Black (Independent)	Jim Pead (Independent)	Maureen Worsley (Australia/ Independent)	Peter Hughes (Liberal/ Independent)	Ray Saunders (Liberal)	Tim McGhie (Liberal)	Jim Leedman (Liberal)	9 seats 1975–1982
1976	Gordon Walsh (Labor)	Ros Kelly (Labor)	Ian Black (Independent)	Jim Pead (Independent)	Maureen Worsley (Australia/ Independent)	Peter Hughes (Liberal/ Independent)	George Paulus (Liberal)	Tim McGhie (Liberal)	Jim Leedman (Liberal)	9 seats 1975–1982
1977	Gordon Walsh (Labor)	Ros Kelly (Labor)	Ian Black (Independent)	Jim Pead (Independent)	Maureen Worsley (Australia/ Independent)	Peter Hughes (Liberal/ Independent)	George Paulus (Liberal)	Tim McGhie (Liberal)	Jim Leedman (Liberal)	9 seats 1975–1982
1977	Paul Whalan (Labor)	Ros Kelly (Labor)	Ian Black (Independent)	Jim Pead (Independent)	Maureen Worsley (Australia/ Independent)	Peter Hughes (Liberal/ Independent)	George Paulus (Liberal)	Tim McGhie (Liberal)	Jim Leedman (Liberal)	9 seats 1975–1982
1977	Paul Whalan (Labor)	Ros Kelly (Labor)	Ian Black (Independent)	Jim Pead (Independent)	Maureen Worsley (Australia/ Independent)	Peter Hughes (Liberal/ Independent)	George Paulus (Liberal)	Tim McGhie (Liberal)	Jim Leedman (Liberal)	9 seats 1975–1982
1979	Paul Whalan (Labor)	Ken Doyle (Labor)	Maurene Horder (Labor)	Jim Pead (Independent)	Robyn Walmsley (Labor)	Gordon Walsh (Democrats)	Betty Hocking (Family Team)	Liz Grant (Liberal)	Jim Leedman (Liberal)	9 seats 1975–1982
1982	Paul Whalan (Labor)	Ken Doyle (Labor)	Maurene Horder (Labor)	Joan Taggart (Labor)	Robyn Walmsley (Labor)	Gordon Walsh (Democrats)	Betty Hocking (Family Team)	David Adams (Liberal)	Jim Leedman (Liberal)	Peter Kobold (Liberal)
