= Pipeline Authority Act 1973 =

The Pipeline Authority Act 1973 was an Act of the Parliament of Australia.

It was enacted by Prime Minister Gough Whitlam and his Labor Party to oversee the planning and construction of a National Pipeline system and its subsequent operation and maintenance.

The Act was repealed by the Energy Legislation Amendment Act 2006.
