= Division of Fraser (Australian Capital Territory House of Assembly) =

Coordinates: 35.2817°S 149.1311°E

The division of Fraser was one of the two electorates of the unicameral Australian Capital Territory House of Assembly. It elected 9 members in 1975 and 1979, and 8 members in 1982. It was named for Jim Fraser, who was the Member for Australian Capital Territory from 1951 to 1970. It encompassed the northern suburbs of Canberra, including the districts of Belconnen, Gungahlin, North Canberra and also the Jervis Bay Territory.

== Members ==
Year	Member	Member	Member	Member	Member	Member	Member	Member	Member
1975	Peter Vallee (Labor)	Susan Ryan (Labor)	Fred McCauley (Independent)	Ivor Vivian (Australia/ Democrats)	Allan Fraser (Independent)	Harold Hird (Independent)	Trevor Kaine (Liberal)	Warren Lennon (Liberal)	Greg Cornwell (Liberal)
1976	Peter Vallee (Labor)	John Clements (Labor)	Fred McCauley (Independent)	Ivor Vivian (Australia/ Democrats)	Allan Fraser (Independent)	Harold Hird (Independent)	Trevor Kaine (Liberal)	Warren Lennon (Liberal)	Greg Cornwell (Liberal)
1977	Peter Vallee (Labor)	John Clements (Labor)	Fred McCauley (Independent)	Ivor Vivian (Australia/ Democrats)	Allan Fraser (Independent)	Harold Hird (Independent)	Ron Bell (Liberal)	Warren Lennon (Liberal)	Greg Cornwell (Liberal)
1978	Peter Vallee (Labor)	John Clements (Labor)	Fred McCauley (Independent)	Ivor Vivian (Australia/ Democrats)	Bill Pye (Independent)	Harold Hird (Independent)	Ron Bell (Liberal)	Warren Lennon (Liberal)	Greg Cornwell (Liberal)
1979	Peter Vallee (Labor)	John Clements (Labor)	Peter Christie (Labor)	Ivor Vivian (Australia/ Democrats)	Bill Pye (Independent)	Harold Hird (Independent)	Marc Robinson (Labor)	Don Webb (Liberal)	Greg Cornwell (Liberal)
1982	Peter Vallee (Labor)	John Clements (Labor)	Peter Christie (Labor)	Ivor Vivian (Australia/ Democrats)	Bill Pye (Independent)	Harold Hird (Independent)	Marc Robinson (Labor)	Don Webb (Liberal)	Greg Cornwell (Liberal)
1982	Peter Vallee (Labor)	John Clements (Labor)	Sue Craven (Labor)	Barry Reid (Labor)	8 seats 1982–1986	Harold Hird (Independent)	Bev Cains (Family Team)	Trevor Kaine (Liberal)	Greg Cornwell (Liberal)
