= David Adams (Australian politician) =

Australian politician (1930–2021)

David Adams (30 October 1930 – 16 January 2021) was an Australian politician. He was a Liberal member of the Australian Capital Territory House of Assembly for Canberra from 1982 to 1986, and unsuccessfully attempted to enter the Australian Capital Territory Legislative Assembly in 1989 as a National Party member. Adams died on 16 January 2021, at the age of 90.
