= Mark Robinson (Shropshire cricketer) =

English cricketer

Mark Robinson (born 19 October 1984) is an English cricketer. He was born in Shrewsbury.

A slow left-arm bowler, Robinson played most of his club cricket for Oswestry Cricket Club, captaining the club between 2009 and 2015. He made his debut for Shropshire in 2005, making his only List A appearance for the county in that season's C&G Trophy. That season, he also played one Second XI game for Glamorgan. He continued to represent Shropshire through the 2011 season, playing a total of 14 Minor Counties Championship and 8 Minor Counties Trophy matches during his career.
