= Bev Cains =

Australian politician

Member of the Australian Capital Territory House of Assembly for Fraser
- In office 1979–1986

Personal details
- Born: 25 February 1938 (age 88)
- Party: Better Management Team
- Other political affiliations: Family Team (until c. 1989)

Beverley Mary Evelyn Cains (born 25 February 1938) is an Australian former politician.

Cains was elected to the Australian Capital Territory House of Assembly for the electorate of Fraser in 1979 as a member of the Family Team; she was the party's sole representative until 1982, when she was joined by Betty Hocking. The House of Assembly ceased to exist in 1986 in preparation for self-government.

After unsuccessfully contesting the federal seat of Canberra in the 1987 Australian federal election, Cains headed the Family Team's ticket for the new Australian Capital Territory Legislative Assembly in the 1989 ACT election, but was defeated.

Her final attempt at winning public office was in the 1992 ACT election. On that occasion she was second on the list for the Better Management Team. First on the list was Harold Hird (who had been an independent member of the Legislative Assembly 1975-1979 and House of Assembly 1979–1986, and would subsequently be a Liberal member of the Legislative Assembly 1995–2001) and third was Alan Fitzgerald (who had been a member of the predecessor body the Australian Capital Territory Advisory Council 1967–1974, initially as a joke candidate and then as a member of the Australia Party).
