= Marcus Robinson (artist) =

- Born: 23 November 1959 (age 66); Belfast, Northern Ireland
- Known for: Artist, filmmaker

Marcus Robinson is a photographer and filmmaker specialising in urban transformation and architecture. He is based in TriBeCa, Lower Manhattan in New York City, although he also occasionally works from his family home in Belfast. Robinson's art is created using different media including photography, film, music and painting.

== His work ==
After graduating from Cambridge University in 1982 Robinson moved to Paris. He began to take black and white photographs of actors in his small flat in the Cour de Petites Ecuries. He later had exhibitions of his landscape photographs in cafés and galleries around Paris. His work on photographing urban landscapes was seen by a development company who in 1987 commissioned him to photograph a number of large construction projects around Paris. This was followed by work as a documentary film-maker in London where he produced a film called The Millennium Wheel. This time-lapse documentary charts the building of the tallest observation wheel in Europe, the London Eye. It was screened at the London Film Festival and on Channel 4 on the eve of the new Millennium.

Robinson has contributed a number of special time-lapse sequences and stills for various films including Millions (Danny Boyle, 2004) and Wonderland (Revolution Films, 1999). He also did some time-lapse sequences for a number of TV mini series including Castle (2003), and Tory! Tory! Tory! (2006).

His most recent project has been documenting the rebuilding of the World Trade Center towers (including One World Trade Center (or 1 WTC). His studio is based in the empty 46th floor of Larry Silverstein's World Trade Center Tower #3 which is next to 1 WTC with views that stretch across New York Harbor and up to Midtown. The resulting hour-long film called Rebuilding the World Trade Center was first broadcast on Channel 4 TV on 1 September 2013 in the UK.

== Publications ==
Numerous books of his work have been published including Eye: The Story Behind the London Eye, Home (Home Office Consortium 2006), and Les Miroirs du Temps (Hazan 1992).
