= Susan Ryan =

Australian politician (1942–2020)

The Honourable Susan Ryan AO FAICD
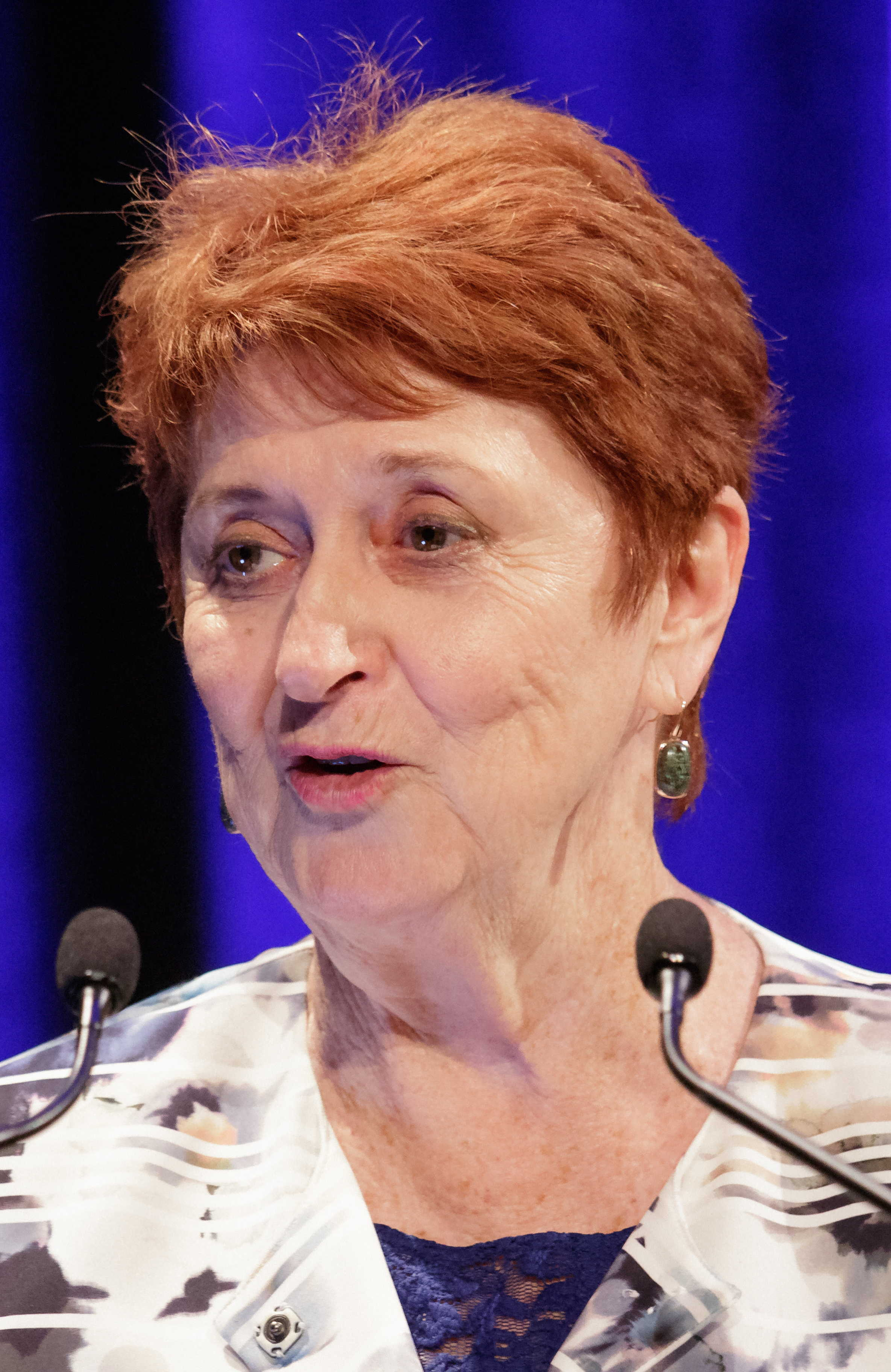
- Ryan in 2015

Age Discrimination Commissioner
- In office 30 July 2011 – 29 July 2016
- Appointed by: Julia Gillard
- Preceded by: Elizabeth Broderick
- Succeeded by: Kay Patterson

Special Minister of State
- In office 24 July 1987 – 19 January 1988
- Prime Minister: Bob Hawke
- Preceded by: Michael Tate
- Succeeded by: Frank Walker

Minister for Education
- In office 11 March 1983 – 24 July 1987
- Prime Minister: Bob Hawke
- Preceded by: Peter Baume
- Succeeded by: John Dawkins

Minister Assisting the Prime Minister for the Status of Women
- In office 11 March 1983 – 19 January 1988
- Prime Minister: Bob Hawke
- Preceded by: Office Created
- Succeeded by: Margaret Reynolds

Senator for the Australian Capital Territory
- In office 13 December 1975 – 29 January 1988
- Preceded by: Seat Created
- Succeeded by: Bob McMullan

Personal details
- Born: Susan Maree Ryan; 10 October 1942 Camperdown, New South Wales, Australia
- Died: 27 September 2020 (aged 77) Randwick, New South Wales, Australia
- Party: Labor
- Spouse: Richard Butler (m. 1963; div. 1972)
- Children: 2
- Education: University of Sydney, Australian National University
- Profession: Educator

Susan Maree Ryan (10 October 1942 – 27 September 2020) was an Australian politician and public servant. She was a member of the Australian Labor Party (ALP) and held ministerial office in the Hawke government as Minister Assisting the Prime Minister for the Status of Women (1983–1988), Minister for Education and Youth Affairs (1983–1984), Minister for Education (1984–1987) and Special Minister of State (1987–1988). She was the first woman from the ALP to serve in cabinet and was notably involved in the creation of the Sex Discrimination Act 1984 and the Affirmative Action (Equal Opportunities in Employment) Act 1986. Ryan served as a senator for the Australian Capital Territory from 1975 to 1987. After leaving politics she served as the Age Discrimination Commissioner from 2011 to 2016, within the Australian Human Rights Commission.

== Early life ==
Ryan was born on 10 October 1942 in Camperdown, New South Wales. She was the daughter of Florence Ena (née Hodson) and Arthur Francis Aloysius Ryan; her mother worked as a sales assistant and her father was a public servant. Ryan grew up in the suburb of Maroubra and attended the Brigidine Convent. She enrolled at the Sydney Teachers' College in 1960, graduating with a Bachelor of Arts in 1963. In the same year she married future diplomat Richard Butler.

Ryan worked as a schoolteacher until the birth of her first child in 1964, later running a small business, the Living Parish Hymn Book Publishing Company, from her home in Cremorne. In 1965 the family moved to Canberra for her then husband Richard Butler's career. She enrolled as a postgraduate at the Australian National University (ANU), studying English literature. In 1966 the family moved to Austria, where Butler was second secretary at the Australian embassy in Vienna. They returned to Australia in 1969 and Ryan resumed her studies at ANU, also tutoring part-time at the Canberra College of Advanced Education. In 1970 they moved to New York for another of Butler's diplomatic postings; however, the marriage broke down and Ryan returned to Australia the following year. They divorced in 1972.

In 1973, Ryan graduated from ANU with a Master of Arts degree. In the same year she was appointed national executive officer of the Australian Council of State School Organisations. Ryan was also a foundation member of the Belconnen branch of the Australian Labor Party (ALP) and the Women's Electoral Lobby. She unsuccessfully stood for ALP preselection in the Division of Fraser prior to the 1974 federal election.

== Political career ==
In 1974, Ryan was appointed to the non-governing ACT Advisory Council and elected to the non-governing ACT House of Assembly, serving briefly between 1975 and 1976 as the member for Fraser.

In 1975 she was elected as one of the first two senators for the ACT, on the slogan "A woman's place is in the Senate". She was the ACT's first female senator and first Labor senator. When the Hawke Labor government was elected in March 1983, Ryan was appointed Minister for Education and Youth Affairs and Minister assisting the Prime Minister for the Status of Women. She was Minister for Education in the second Hawke Ministry and opposed the re-introduction of fees for tertiary education despite strong support in Cabinet for the user-pays principle. She lost the education portfolio in the third Hawke Ministry and was instead given a much reduced role as Special Minister of State, with responsibility for the ill-fated Australia Card. Subsequently, the Higher Education Contribution Scheme was introduced to partially fund higher education. Ryan resigned from the Senate on 29 January 1988.

Ryan had a strong focus on gender equality in politics. A private member's bill introduced by her in 1981 was crucial to the development of the Sex Discrimination Act 1984, the Affirmative Action (Equal Employment Opportunity for Women) Act 1986, the Public Service Reform Act 1984 and the Equal Employment Opportunity (Commonwealth Authorities) Act 1987. She was also a founding member of the Women's Electoral Lobby ACT branch.

As Minister for Education Ryan was responsible for steering through the government's adoption of the National Policy on Languages in 1987, Australia's first explicit language policy, which she had commissioned Joseph Lo Bianco to prepare. In 2016 she participated in the 30th anniversary celebrations of this breakthrough, held at the RJ Hawke Centre, University of South Australia.

== After politics ==
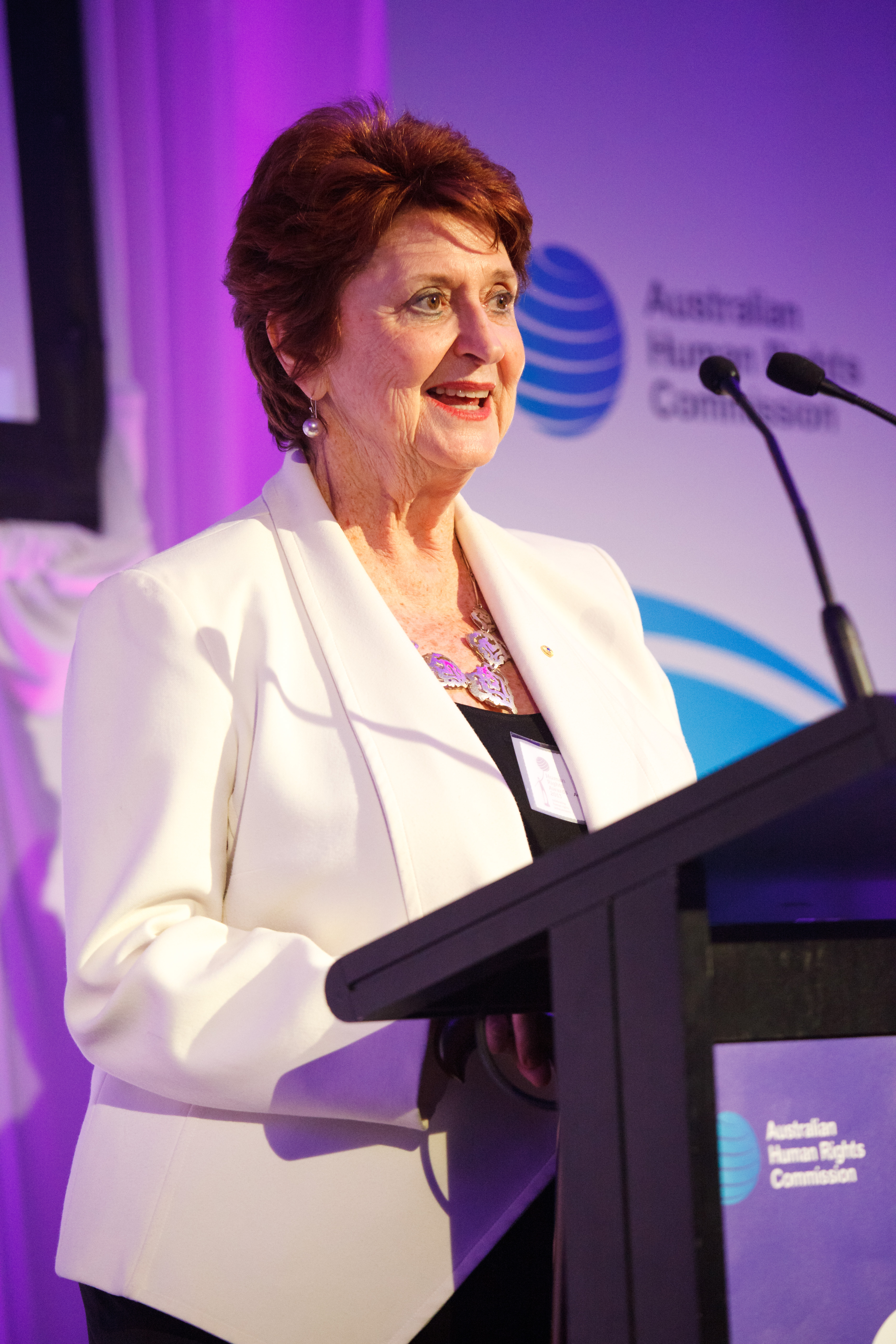
Ryan at the 2013 Human Rights Awards

Following her resignation from politics, Ryan worked as an editor and in the insurance, plastics and superannuation industries. In November 1998 Ryan was appointed one of the first two pro-chancellors of the University of New South Wales, a position she held until 2011. She was president of the Australian Institute of Superannuation Trustees from 2000 to 2007. Ryan campaigned for an Australian bill of rights and was deputy chairman of the Australian Republican Movement from 2000 to 2003. In 1999 Ryan published a political autobiography, Catching the Waves: life in and out of politics.

In July 2011, Ryan was appointed as Australia's inaugural Age Discrimination Commissioner with the Australian Human Rights Commission for a 5-year term. She was also the Disability Discrimination Commissioner, from 2014 to 2016.

== Honours and awards ==
Ryan was appointed an Officer of the Order of Australia (AO) in June 1990. She received honorary doctorates from the Australian National University, University of Canberra, Macquarie University and the University of South Australia.

In April 2018 Ryan was awarded the Australian National University's Alumni of the Year award.

== Death ==
Ryan died on 27 September 2020 in Sydney, aged 77. She had fallen ill after going for a swim on 25 September, and had been in intensive care at Prince of Wales Hospital in Randwick since then.

Paying tribute, former Prime Minister Paul Keating said Ryan's greatest achievement in politics had been as Education Minister helping lift Australian high school retention from a rate of three children in 10 to nine children in 10. Incumbent Prime Minister Scott Morrison also paid tribute, calling her a "ground breaker" as the first Minister for Women. ACT senator Katy Gallagher said Ryan campaigned that a woman's place was in "all the places where decisions were being made".

== See also ==
- List of the first women holders of political offices in Oceania

Political offices
Preceded by Peter Baume	Minister for Education; 1983–1987	Succeeded by John Dawkins
Preceded by Office Created	Minister Assisting the Prime Minister for the Status of Women; 1983–1988	Succeeded by Margaret Reynolds
Preceded by Michael Tate	Special Minister of State; 1987–1988	Succeeded by Frank Walker
Parliament of Australia
Preceded by Seat Created	Senator for the Australian Capital Territory; 1975–1988	Succeeded by Bob McMullan
Legal offices
Preceded by Elizabeth Broderick	Age Discrimination Commissioner; 2011–2016	Succeeded by Kay Patterson
