= Marc Robinson (politician) =

Australian politician

Marcus Laurence "Marc" Robinson (born 22 September 1953) is an Australian former politician. He was a Labor member of the Australian Capital Territory House of Assembly for Fraser from 1979 to 1982. In 1984, he was expected to win preselection to stand for the federal seat of Fraser, but was unexpectedly defeated by John Langmore.
