= Barry Reid =

Australian politician

Barry John Reid (22 May 1935 – 2003) was an Australian politician.

Reid was a Labor member of the Australian Capital Territory House of Assembly for Fraser from 1982 to 1986. He had previously worked as an accountant in the Department of Trade and Treasury under the Whitlam government.
