= Robyn Walmsley =

Australian Capital Territory politician

Robyn-Lyn Walmsley (known as Robyn Walmsley) is an Australian former politician. She was an Australian Labor Party member of the former Australian Capital Territory House of Assembly from 1979 to 1985.

== Early life ==
Walmsley was born in Canberra. At the time of her election to the House of Assembly in 1979, she was 32, a qualified biochemist, a graduate student in politics at the Australian National University, and married with two children.

== Community activism ==
Prior to election to the ACT House of Assembly, Walmsley was active in the Abortion Counselling Service. and a vice-president of the Family Planning Association. She was also an active member of Women Against Rape. In 1981 she was elected vice-president of the ACT Council of Social Service.

== Career ==
Walmsley was elected to the ACT House of Assembly in 1979, for the Division of Canberra. Peter Vallee was Labor leader from 1977 to 1982. He resigned, in order to allow a woman to lead Labor into the 1982 election. Walmsley then became the acting leader, but, as it turned out, a woman was not elected leader. The new leader was Ken Doyle, but he resigned after a year, in 1983, and Maurene Horder was elected leader in his place.

Walmsley resigned as a MHA in 1985, and was replaced by Rosemary Follett.
