= Maurene Horder =

Australian politician

Maurene Horder (born 1950) is an Australian former politician. She is notable for having been the first woman to be the parliamentary leader of the Australian Labor Party in any state or territory of Australia, and also for having been the first parliamentarian in the Australian Capital Territory to give birth whilst a member. Since leaving politics in 1985, she has been a senior executive.

== Early life ==
Horder was born in Sydney in 1950, to Mervyn Horder and his wife Mary (née Brown). She moved to Canberra in 1972.

Before entering politics, Horder was a teacher, and then a public servant with the Department of Education.

== Political career ==
Horder was elected to the ACT House of Assembly in 1979, for the Division of Canberra.

Peter Vallee was Labor leader from 1977 to 1982. He resigned, in order to allow a woman to lead Labor into the 1982 election. Robyn Walmsley was then the acting leader, but, as it turned out, a woman was not elected leader. The new leader was Ken Doyle, but he resigned after a year, in 1983, and Horder was elected leader in his place. Horder thereby became the first woman to lead a parliamentary Labor Party in any of the Australian states or territories, albeit in a parliament that only had an advisory role.

Horder was Junior Vice-president of the ACT Branch of the ALP in 1978 and President in 1982.

Horder resigned as both leader of the Labor Party and as a member of the House of Assembly in 1985. She was replaced as a MHA by Kevin Gill and as Labor leader by Paul Whalan.

In 1984 she unsuccessfully sought Labor pre-selection for the Federal Division of Fowler, losing out to Ted Grace.

== Career after politics ==
The day after Horder announced her resignation as leader and from the House of Assembly, she was appointed as a ministerial consultant by Chris Hurford, the Minister for Immigration and Ethnic Affairs.

She was NSW State Manager of the Plastics and Chemicals Industries Association from 1990 to 1998, then Chief Executive of the National Marine Safety Committee's Secretariat from 1999 to 2008, and Chief Executive of the Migration Institute of Australia from 2008 to 2013. She was then NSW Executive Officer of the Planning Institute of Australia. She was a Motorists' Action Group endorsed candidate for elections to the board of the NRMA in 2008.

Horder is vice-chairperson of Sunnyhaven Disability Services and part-time Chair and managing director of the National Standards Development Organisation. She is a board member of Clean Up Australia. She has been a board member of the Alzheimer Association, Karabi Community and Development Services, Fairfield Resources Centre and Cabramatta Community Service.

== Personal life ==
Horder married Dr Graham Harrison. When she had her first child, Adrian, in 1980, she was the first member of the ACT House of Assembly or any of its predecessor bodies to give birth whilst a member. She was still a MHA when she had her second child, Virginia, in 1982.

== See also ==
- List of the first women holders of political offices in Oceania
