= ACT Labor Party =

ACT branch of the Australian Labor Party

ACT Labor Party Australian Labor Party (Australian Capital Territory Branch)
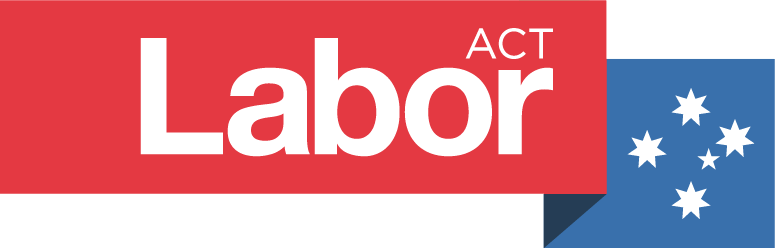
- Leader: Andrew Barr
- Deputy Leader: Rachel Stephen-Smith
- President: Sue Ducker
- Secretary: Caitlin Cook
- Founded: 1973; 53 years ago
- Headquarters: 1st Floor, 222 City Walk, Canberra, Australian Capital Territory
- Youth wing: Australian Young Labor
- Women's wing: Labor Women's Network
- LGBT wing: Rainbow Labor
- Norfolk Island sub-branch: Norfolk Labor (until 2015)
- Membership (2021): ▲2,000
- Ideology: Social democracy
- Political position: Centre-left
- National affiliation: Australian Labor
- Colours: Red
- Slogan: On Your Side
- Legislative Assembly: 10 / 25
- House of Representatives: 3 / 3 (ACT seats)
- Senate: 1 / 2 (ACT seats)

Website
- actlabor.org.au

The ACT Labor Party, officially known as the Australian Labor Party (ACT Branch) and commonly referred to simply as ACT Labor, is the Australian Capital Territory branch of the Australian Labor Party (ALP). The branch is the current ruling party in the ACT and is led by Andrew Barr, who has concurrently served as chief minister since 2014. It is one of two major parties in the unicameral ACT Legislative Assembly.

Originally a part of the New South Wales Labor Party, the ALP National Conference established an autonomous ACT Branch in 1973. There have been four Labor Chief Ministers since self-government in 1989. The most recent is the current Chief Minister, Andrew Barr, who has served since 2014.

ACT Labor has been in Government since 2001.

The current ACT Labor Platform notes that the objective of the party is social justice and the pursuit of a fair, just and equitable society.

== History ==
=== Pre-1973 Autonomy (1930–1973) ===
In 1930, the first ACT ALP Branch was established as part of the NSW party. The first meeting was held at the Friendly Society's hall at Kingston. The party endorsed candidates for the Advisory Council and also for the Canberra Community Hospital Board.

In 1931, the Branch called a meeting of trade union representatives which resulted in the formation of the ACT Trades and Labour Council. During the 1940s the party continued to grow. It met monthly in either the Civic or Kingston Hotels.

The party lobbied for federal representation and in 1949, Canberrans elected their first federal member. Initially an independent was elected but shortly after Jim Fraser won the seat for the ALP. Fraser held the seat for 19 years until his death. However he was limited to voting only on Territorial matters until 1966.

In 1951, a second ACT Branch was established in Jervis Bay. A South Canberra Branch was established in 1957 which led to the establishment of a Canberra Federal Electorate Council of the NSW Branch.

1968 saw a challenge to the preselection of Jim Fraser within the ALP. The issue was the Vietnam War and it involved a North-South split. The contender Gordon Walsh won the preselection, but this was later overturned by the NSW Branch.

During this time the Australian National University was a major source of members of the party and various academics were active participants in its affairs. For example, in 1968 the Canberra City (North) Branch had 118 members of which 13 were undergraduates, 14 were postgraduate students and 10 were academics.

=== Pre-Self Government (1973–1989) ===
In 1973 the ALP National Conference established an autonomous ACT Branch and the present structure was established. The ACT electorate was divided into two electorates of Canberra and Fraser (after Jim Fraser not Malcolm) and two Senate positions were established in 1974.

The women's movement has exerted a strong influence on the ACT Branch. In 1974 Susan Ryan was preselected for the Senate and the Branch has a history of electing women as its candidates and party officials. Joan Taggart from the ACT Branch was elected junior vice-president of the ALP in 1979, thereby becoming the first woman to hold a national office bearer post in the Labor Party. In 1983 Ryan became the first Labor woman Federal Minister. In 1987 Ros Kelly became the first Labor woman Federal Minister in the House of Representatives. In 1989, Rosemary Follett became the first woman Chief Minister or Premier of any State or Territory in Australia, and then the first woman in Australia's history to attend the Premiers Conference.

While Canberra has largely been an exclusively Federal concern it has nevertheless had a partial elected Advisory Council since 1930. The ALP has endorsed candidates to the different versions of this body since its inception. In 1974 the Advisory Council was replaced by a fully elected advisory body titled the Legislative Assembly. In the first elections the ALP won only 4 out of the 18 positions.

The Federal Liberal government held a referendum on self-government in 1978. The referendum was conducted in such a way as to ensure a negative outcome. Following the referendum, the ACT House of Assembly was created which had similar advisory powers to the old Legislative Assembly. In the 1979 and 1982 elections Labor won 8 of the 18 positions.

=== ACT Self-Government (Post–1989) ===
The House of Assembly was abolished in 1987 to make way for a self-governing body. A fully autonomous Legislative Assembly was finally established in 1989 and Labor captured 5 of the 17 positions. As Labor was the largest party, Rosemary Follett, the Labor Assembly Leader, was able to form the first government. Rosemary Follett held office for 7 months until a coalition of Liberals and others organised a spill.

Labor re-took power in June 1991 after a successful no-confidence motion was moved against the Liberal-Residents Rally Alliance Government. ACT Elections were held in February 1992 and Labor was returned to power with the number of MLAs increased from five to eight, only one short of majority Government. After the 1995 and 1998 elections Labor formed the Opposition to a minority Liberal government.

Labor won back Government on 20 October 2001 and retained government at the elections held in 2004, 2008, 2012, 2016, 2020 and 2024. Labor's election win in 2004 was particularly significant as it was the first and, so far, only time a single party has won a majority in the ACT's Legislative Assembly.

The Norfolk Island Labor Party operated as a sub-branch of ACT Labor until it faded away sometime after 2015.

== Leadership ==
=== Leaders ===
| Image | Name (birth–death) | Electorate | Term start | Term end | Time in office | Chief Minister (term) |
|---|---|---|---|---|---|---|
| | R.R. O'Keefe | – | 2 August 1964 | 8 July 1967 | 2 years, 340 days | N/A |
| | Gordon Walsh (1932–2000) | Canberra (1974–1977) | 8 July 1967 | 26 January 1977 | 9 years, 202 days | N/A |
| | Peter Vallee | Fraser | 26 January 1977 | 29 April 1982 | 5 years, 93 days | N/A |
| | Robyn Walmsley (acting) (born 1947) | Canberra | 29 April 1982 | 23 June 1982 | 55 days | N/A |
| | Ken Doyle | Canberra | 23 June 1982 | 7 March 1983 | 257 days | N/A |
| | Maurene Horder (born 1950) | Canberra | 7 March 1983 | 28 June 1985 | 2 years, 113 days | N/A |
| | Paul Whalan (born 1941) | Canberra | 28 June 1985 | 30 June 1986 | 1 year, 2 days | N/A |
| | Rosemary Follett (born 1948) | Molonglo (1995–1996) | 17 December 1988 | 5 March 1996 | 7 years, 79 days | |
| | Rosemary Follett (born 1948) | Molonglo (1995–1996) | 17 December 1988 | 5 March 1996 | 7 years, 79 days | Herself (1989–1989) |
| | Rosemary Follett (born 1948) | Molonglo (1995–1996) | 17 December 1988 | 5 March 1996 | 7 years, 79 days | Kaine (1989–1991) |
| | Rosemary Follett (born 1948) | Molonglo (1995–1996) | 17 December 1988 | 5 March 1996 | 7 years, 79 days | Herself (1991–1995) |
| | Rosemary Follett (born 1948) | Molonglo (1995–1996) | 17 December 1988 | 5 March 1996 | 7 years, 79 days | Carnell (1995–2000) |
| | Andrew Whitecross (born 1963) | Brindabella | 5 March 1996 | 19 August 1997 | 1 year, 167 days | Carnell (1995–2000) |
| | Wayne Berry (born 1942) | Ginninderra | 19 August 1997 | 21 February 1998 | 186 days | Carnell (1995–2000) |
| | Jon Stanhope (born 1951) | Ginninderra | 19 March 1998 | 12 May 2011 | 13 years, 54 days | Carnell (1995–2000) |
| | Jon Stanhope (born 1951) | Ginninderra | 19 March 1998 | 12 May 2011 | 13 years, 54 days | Humphries (2000–2001) |
| | Jon Stanhope (born 1951) | Ginninderra | 19 March 1998 | 12 May 2011 | 13 years, 54 days | Himself (2001–2011) |
| | Katy Gallagher (born 1970) | Molonglo | 16 May 2011 | 10 December 2014 | 3 years, 208 days | Herself (2011–2014) |
| | Andrew Barr (born 1973) | Molonglo (2006–2016); Kurrajong (2016–present) | 11 December 2014 | Incumbent | 11 years, 283 days | Himself (2014–present) |

== Election results ==
=== Legislative Assembly ===
| Election | Leader | Votes | % | Seats | +/– | Position | Status |
|---|---|---|---|---|---|---|---|
| 1989 | Rosemary Follett | 32,370 | 22.82 | 5 / 17 | ▲5 | ▲1st | Minority |
| 1992 | Rosemary Follett | 62,155 | 39.92 | 8 / 17 | ▲3 | 1st | Minority |
| 1995 | Rosemary Follett | 52,276 | 31.63 | 6 / 17 | ▼2 | ▼2nd | Opposition |
| 1998 | Wayne Berry | 49,798 | 27.61 | 6 / 17 | Steady | 2nd | Opposition |
| 2001 | Jon Stanhope | 79,616 | 41.72 | 8 / 17 | ▲2 | ▲1st | Minority |
| 2004 | Jon Stanhope | 95,635 | 46.84 | 9 / 17 | ▲1 | 1st | Majority |
| 2008 | Jon Stanhope | 79,126 | 37.39 | 7 / 17 | ▼2 | 1st | Minority |
| 2012 | Katy Gallagher | 85,991 | 38.88 | 8 / 17 | ▲1 | ▼2nd | Coalition |
| 2016 | Andrew Barr | 93,811 | 38.43 | 12 / 25 | ▲4 | ▲1st | Coalition |
| 2020 | Andrew Barr | 101,826 | 37.82 | 10 / 25 | ▼2 | 1st | Coalition |
| 2024 | Andrew Barr | 93,569 | 34.15 | 10 / 25 | Steady | 1st | Minority |

== See also ==
- Labor–Greens coalition
