= Jim Leedman =

Australian politician (1938–2024)

Jim Leedman AM MHA

President of the ACT Liberal Party
- In office 1989–1992
- Preceded by: Gary Humphries
- Succeeded by: Gwen Wilcox
- In office 1966–1968
- Preceded by: George Hohnen
- Succeeded by: Gwen Wilcox

Leader of the ACT Liberal Party
- In office 20 January 1977 – 10 December 1988
- Preceded by: Peter Hughes
- Succeeded by: Trevor Kaine
- In office 1966 – 30 October 1974
- Succeeded by: Peter Hughes

Deputy Leader of the ACT Liberal Party
- In office 30 October 1974 – 20 January 1977
- Succeeded by: Trevor Kaine

Member of the Australian Capital Territory House of Assembly for Canberra
- In office 28 September 1974 – 30 June 1986

Member of the Australian Capital Territory Advisory Council
- In office 16 September 1967 – 28 September 1974

Personal details
- Born: James Willoughby Leedman; 7 January 1938 Kalgoorlie, Western Australia, Australia
- Died: 7 December 2024 (aged 86) Canberra, Australia
- Party: Liberal
- Spouse: Heather Leedman
- Children: 4

James Willoughby Leedman AM (7 January 1938 – 7 December 2024) was an Australian politician who served as the leader and president of the Liberal Party in the Australian Capital Territory (ACT).

== Early life ==
Leedman was born in the Western Australian city of Kalgoorlie, attending Scotch College in Perth and graduating from the University of Western Australia (UWA) in 1960. He played for the UWA Rugby Club between 1956 and 1959 with his brother, Bruce Leedman. Shortly after graduating from UWA, he left Australia to travel around the world for three years, and while in the United States, received a scholarship to do a master's degree in international relations at Clark University in Massachusetts.

He returned to Western Australia in 1963, before moving to Canberra the following year to work with the Department of Trade and Industry. He then moved into private practice as a barrister and solicitor.

== Political career ==
In 1966, Leedman became president of the ACT Liberal Party's Canberra branch, and also served as the party's Electoral Conference president. He became president of the newly-formed Woden Valley branch later that year.

=== House of Assembly ===
Leedman led the Liberals at the 1967 election for the Australian Capital Territory Advisory Council. He was one of two Liberals elected, and was later re-elected in 1970.

In 1974, he led the Liberals at the first election for newly-formed ACT Legislative Assembly (later House of Assembly), and was elected as one of nine members for the division of Canberra. Following the election, fellow Canberra MLA Peter Hughes won a caucus vote to become the new Liberal leader, with Leedman moving to the position of deputy leader.

Hughes resigned as leader and from the Liberal Party in January 1977 to sit as an independent. Leedman, as well as Fraser MLA Trevor Kaine, sought the leadership, with Leedman emerging successful at a leadership election on 20 January 1977.

In October 1985, Leedman chose not to support amendments to ACT criminal legislation which would make marital rape an offence. According to The Canberra Times, Leedman claimed that "to place a husband in the same category as a burglar who broke into a house and raped a female stranger was to denigrate the status of marriage". Although he said there "might be a case for the concept of rape in marriage in cases where couples were separated and living apart," he added that "I cannot accept that it should apply in cases where the husband and wife are continuing to live together".

=== Post-House of Assembly ===
Leedman remained as Liberal leader until a 1988 leadership election, conducted ahead of the first ACT election under self-government, which saw Trevor Kaine chosen the party's leader. He maintained a low profile ahead of the 1989 ACT election and was not one of the ten Liberal candidates chosen for the election.

Leedman later returned as ACT Liberal Party president, serving in the role from 1989 until 1992. During his presidency, the party had two leadership elections – one in June 1991 and the other in July 1991 – with the former seeing Trevor Kaine removed as leader by Gary Humphries just days after Leedman declared Kaine's position was safe.

== Personal life and death ==
Leedman was married to Heather Leedman and had four children. He converted to Christianity in the early 1980s and became a member of the Forrest Uniting Church.

On Australia Day 1988, Leedman was made a Member of the Order of Australia (AM) for "service to the community" in his role at the Department of the Treasury.

Leedman died on 7 December 2024, at the age of 86. A funeral service was held on 12 December 2024 at Wesley Uniting Church.
