= Australian Family Movement =

Former Australian political party

Family Team Australian Family Movement
- Founded: 1974
- Registered: 9 August 1984 (federal)
- Dissolved: c. 1989
- ACT House of Assembly: 2 / 18 (1982–1986)

The Australian Family Movement was a minor familialist Australian political party formed in 1974 and active throughout the 1970s and 1980s. It originally came out of a group created to oppose the stage show Hair in Adelaide (this group was successful in convincing the Liberal state government to ban the show).

The party generally stood for conservative Christian principles, and was particularly opposed to homosexuality, transvestism and androgyny, believing them "contrary to the natural order"; and to abortion and euthanasia, placing emphasis on the "dignity and sanctity of all human life, especially at its beginning and at its end".

According to the Australian Electoral Commission, the Australian Family Movement was registered on 9 August 1984 and deregistered on 25 May 1990.

== ACT Division ==
The party's ACT division, the Family Team, won a seat in the Australian Capital Territory House of Assembly in 1979, with party leader Bev Cains entering the House. She was joined by Betty Hocking in 1982, who served one term. Cains held her seat until the abolition of the House of Assembly, when she was defeated in an attempt to transfer to the new Legislative Assembly at the 1989 Australian Capital Territory election. Cains stood again for the Assembly in the 1992 Australian Capital Territory election, but the Family Team had by then been disbanded, and she was a candidate for the Better Management Team.

== See also ==
- Christian politics in Australia
