= Australia Party =

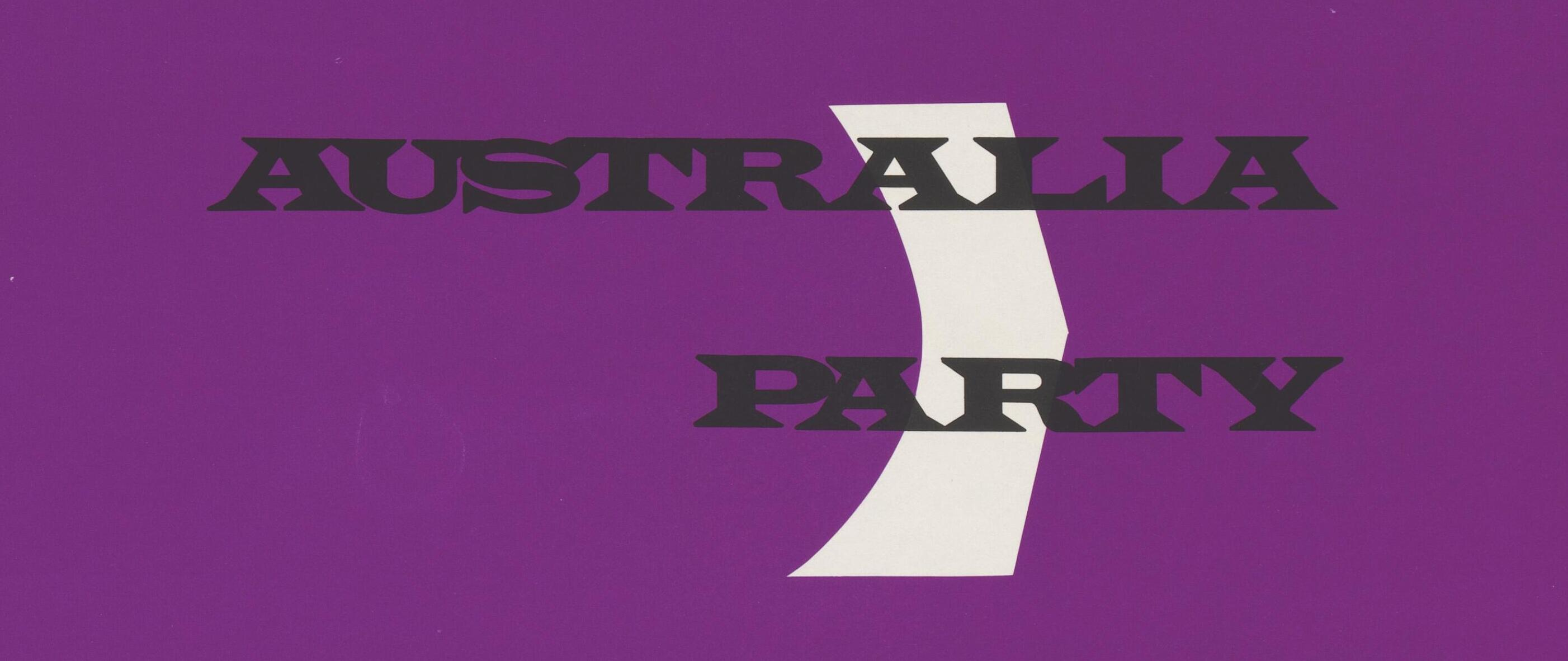
- Party logo c. 1972
- Founded: 1969
- Dissolved: 1986
- Preceded by: Australian Reform Movement
- Merged into: Australian Democrats (1977); Unite Australia Party (1986)
- Ideology: Anti-conscription; Social liberalism
- Political position: Centre
- International affiliation: Liberal International

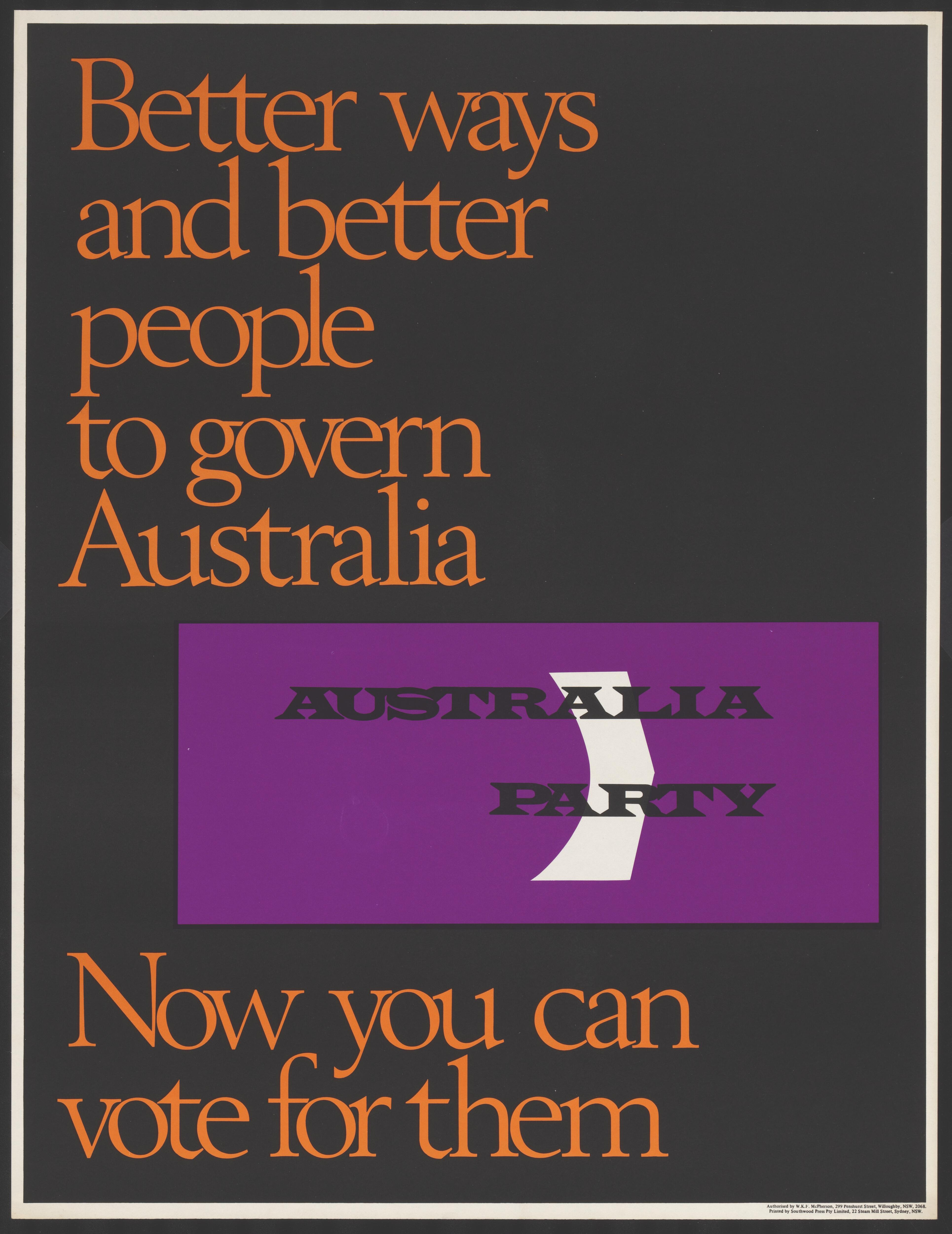
1972 campaign poster used by the party

The Australia Party was a minor centrist political party in Australia from 1969 to 1986. It was most influential in the late 1960s and early 1970s.

The party was established in 1969 under the leadership of Senator Reg Turnbull, as a merger of Turnbull's supporters and Gordon Barton's Australian Reform Movement. Turnbull's involvement was short-lived and he resigned from the party in 1970. At federal level, the party achieved its best result at the 1970 Senate election, with nearly three percent of the national vote. Its preference allocations were also influential at the 1972 and 1974 federal elections, while two candidates were elected to the Australian Capital Territory House of Assembly in 1975. Most members of the party joined the newly formed Australian Democrats in 1977, with former Australia Party national convenors John Siddons and Colin Mason later elected as Democrats senators.

== History ==
=== Background ===
The Australia Party grew out of the Liberal Reform Group, a group of members of the Liberal Party of Australia and Independents who opposed the party's policy of conscription and military involvement in the Vietnam War. The leading figure in this group was a businessman, Gordon Barton, who was assisted in the funding by Ken Thomas of TNT Transport and with the party organisation and branch establishment by Nick Gorshenin, Sydney shark meshing contractor and North Sydney Council alderman.

On 22 October 1966, when US President Lyndon B. Johnson visited Sydney, Gordon Barton and Ken Thomas sponsored a full-page advertisement in the Sydney Morning Herald lamenting the involvement of Australian troops in the Vietnam War. At that time no political party was opposed to Australian involvement in the war. Nick Gorshenin telephoned Gordon Barton that evening and they decided to form the Liberal Reform Group, later rebranded as the Australian Reform Movement. They used their various contacts to establish the initial branches in Sydney, Melbourne, Brisbane, Newcastle and Gold Coast.

=== Peak ===
The "Australia Party" name was adopted in 1969 and registered as a political party, by which time it was also attracting disaffected Australian Labor Party (ALP) supporters. By 1972, its platform was "to liberalise abortion laws, end conscription, eliminate censorship, protect the environment and improve city planning".

The party contested state and federal elections, achieving its best results in 1972. Though failing to win any seats, by directing its preferences to the ALP, it greatly assisted that party to win government for the first time since 1949. The Australia Party poll performance declined a little in 1974 and again in the 1975 federal election; however, by this stage it had replaced the Democratic Labor Party as the fourth party after Labor, Liberal and Country parties.

On 20 July 1969, independent senator Reg Turnbull announced that he and his supporters had agreed to merge with the Australian Reform Movement (ARM) to form a new political party, which was named the Australia Party on the basis that it would "put Australia before party". A main goal of Turnbull and the new party was the end of Australian involvement in the Vietnam War. At the time of the party's creation, the ARM claimed 800 formal members and 8,000 supporters.

Turnbull's term as leader of the Australia Party proved to be "brief and unhappy", with a number of former ARM members leaving the Australia Party as they felt Barton and its leadership had acted undemocratically in conducting secret negotiations with Turnbull. He resigned from the party on 3 March 1970 and reverted back to being an independent.

=== Later years ===
In July 1974, Gordon Barton announced he would not seek re-election as national convenor of the Australia Party. He was replaced by Melbourne industrialist John Siddons in December 1974, who defeated Ian Gilfillan for the position. Siddons was publicly critical of the Whitlam government's economic policies, and proclaimed that the party stood for "the middle ground against the extremes of either right or left". In November 1975 the Australia Party formally affiliated with the Liberal International. Siddons was replaced as national convenor by Colin Mason in August 1976.

Subsequently, the party allied itself with the New Liberal Movement in the formation of the Australian Democrats for the 1977 federal election. However, a rump party continued on, fielding separate candidates in NSW, SA and Victoria in the 1977 election, in SA and Victoria in the 1980 election and the 1982 Flinders by-election. One candidate stood for the House of Representatives in Victoria in 1983. Relations between the rump party and the Australian Democrats were poor: in the 1977 election in South Australia Party preferences flowed to the Liberal Party rather than the Democrats, resulting in the Liberal Baden Teague defeating the Democrat Ian Gilfillan for the fifth and final Senate seat. The rump party merged into former Australian Democrat John Siddons' new Unite Australia Party (UAP) in December 1986, along with the Advance Australia Party. At the time The Canberra Times reported that the Australia Party had few remaining members, most of whom were in Victoria.

== Notable members ==
Significant figures in the Australia Party were Senator Reg Turnbull (elected as an independent, but Australia Party leader in 1969–1970), and journalist Alan Fitzgerald, then an elected member of the Australian Capital Territory Advisory Council. Two Australia Party members were elected to the newly formed Australian Capital Territory House of Assembly in 1975: Ivor Vivian and Maureen Worsley. Vivian joined the Australian Democrats, and was re-elected in 1979, but Worsley sat as an independent from 1977 to the end of her term in 1979. Australia Party members who later entered federal parliament as Australian Democrats senators included Colin Mason (NSW), John Siddons (Vic), Sid Spindler (Vic) and Jean Jenkins (WA).

== Legacy ==
An important aspect of the Australia Party and later Australian Democrats is that they nullified and then overtook the minority influence of the Democratic Labor Party, which had wielded much influence in post-war federal and state politics. The Australia Party altered the power dynamics, and the Australia Democrats continued that role until they were succeeded by the Greens in the 2004 federal election.

== Election results ==
=== House of Representatives ===
Election	Votes	%	Swing	Seats won	Rank
1969	53,646	0.88	▲0.88	0 / 125	▲4th
1972	159,916	2.42	▲1.54	0 / 125	4th
1974	172,176	2.33	▼0.09	0 / 127	▲3rd
1975	33,630	0.43	▼1.89	0 / 127	▼6th
No candidates stood at the 1977 election.
1980	701	0.01	▼0.42	0 / 125	▼13th
1983	844	0.01	0.00	0 / 125	▼16th

=== Senate ===
Election	Votes	%	Swing	Seats won	Rank
1970	163,343	2.90	▲2.90	0 / 60	▲4th
1974	92,107	1.39	▼1.51	0 / 60	4th
1975	34,632	0.48	▼0.91	0 / 64	▼7th
1977	8,283	0.11	▼0.37	0 / 64	▼9th
1980	27,404	0.36	▲0.25	0 / 64	▲7th

== See also ==
- List of liberal parties
- Liberalism in Australia
