= Gordon Walsh =

Australian politician

Gordon John Walsh (30 December 1932 – 14 June 2000) was an Australian politician who served intermittently between 1964 and 1986 in the various representative advisory bodies of the Australian Capital Territory that existed prior to self government.

== Early life ==
Walsh was born in Welling in Kent (now in the London Borough of Bexley) in England. He was twice evacuated from London with other children during World War II. He joined the British Army at 15, and graduated from the St Omer Military School as a catering instructor. He served in Singapore and Malaya, and emigrated to Australia in 1956 following a voyage there as a ship's cook. After his emigration, he served as a caterer at the 1956 Olympic Games.

== Politics ==
He was elected as an Australian Labor Party member of the Australian Capital Territory Advisory Council in 1964, serving until the Council's abolition in 1974. He was elected to the new Legislative Assembly as a Labor member for Canberra in 1974, resigned in 1977, was elected to the renamed House of Assembly in 1979, and served until its abolition in 1986. He was a staunch advocate of self-government for the Territory throughout his time in elected office.

In 1968, he challenged the popular and long-serving Labor federal MP Jim Fraser for party preselection, and defeated him on the first vote in a shock result that was later overturned following intervention by the ALP's New South Wales Executive. He was the first Labor leader in the Legislative Assembly from 1974 until 1977, but resigned from the Assembly and the ALP and joined the Australia Party and then its successor the Australian Democrats, which he would represent until the dissolution of the House of Assembly in 1986. He served as the president of the Australian Capital Territory (ACT) branch of the Democrats starting in 1979, but resigned from that role in 1986 when the federal party opted for a weaker model of independence for the Territory.

He was heavily involved in the movement for self-government in the late 1980s, working with a number of other former MHAs in the Home Rule Movement. He had ceased to be involved with any political party by 1989, and did not nominate for the inaugural 1989 election for the modern Legislative Assembly.

== Death ==
Walsh died in 2000, aged 67. He was survived by his wife Naomi.
