= Australian Capital Territory House of Assembly =

Former legislature of the Australian Capital Territory

Coordinates: 35.2817°S 149.1311°E

House of Assembly Legislative Assembly (1975–1979)

Type
- Type: Unicameral advisory body to the Department of the Capital Territory

History
- Founded: 1975
- Disbanded: 30 June 1986
- Preceded by: Advisory Council
- Succeeded by: Legislative Assembly

Leadership
- Presiding officer: President (1975–1982); Speaker (1982–1986)
- Majority leader: Leader of the House (from 1982)
- Minority leader: Minority Leader (from 1982)

Elections
- First election: 1974
- Last election: 1982

The Australian Capital Territory House of Assembly was the main elected representative body of the Australian Capital Territory between 1975 and 1986, during which time preparation began for the granting of self-government to the Territory. The Assembly had a largely advisory role, with most of the power over the Territory being in the hands of the relevant federal minister.

== Background ==
Three years after the seat of government was established at Canberra and after the opening of the first Parliament House in 1927, an appointed Advisory Council was established to administer the capital. In 1974 this was replaced by a fully elected Legislative Assembly, advising the Department of the Capital Territory. In 1979 this became a House of Assembly of 18 elected members, which was dissolved in 1986. In 1978 a referendum on self-government was defeated, with 68 per cent of voters recording a No vote. The federal Labor government of Prime Minister Bob Hawke set up a Self-Government Task Force in 1986 to report on the government of the ACT.

== Creation of the Assembly ==
The assembly was first created in 1975 by the Whitlam government, as a response to frequent criticism about the lack of representation for the citizens of the territory. Whitlam had appointed the local federal MP, Kep Enderby, as Minister for the ACT, and Enderby sought to create a new representative body along the lines of the Northern Territory Legislative Assembly, which had been created in 1974. Elections were held for the first Legislative Assembly on 28 September that year, with representatives of the Labor Party, Liberal Party, Australia Party, and several independents taking seats in the Assembly. Unlike its Northern Territory counterpart, it was not made self-governing in 1977.

Nine members were elected by Single Transferable Vote proportional representation from each of the ACT's two federal House of Representatives divisions, making 18 in total. Independent members who vacated mid-term were replaced by recounting their original votes to their next preferences to choose a runner-up. Members endorsed by a political party were replaced by a nominee of that party.

The new Assembly began sitting in the then-Civic Offices, later renovated to become the current Legislative Assembly Building. An independent MLA, Jim Pead, took office as the first President (the equivalent of the Speaker) of the new body. Gordon Walsh became the first leader of the Labor caucus, with Peter Hughes leading the Liberal caucus. Both were replaced in 1977; Walsh joined the nascent Australian Democrats, and was replaced as leader by Peter Vallee, Hughes quit the Liberal Party and was replaced as leader by Jim Leedman. Ivor Vivian became the leader of the Australia Party, before being replaced by Walsh in 1977. The first Assembly saw two prominent members on its benches: future federal ministers Ros Kelly and Susan Ryan. Ryan resigned during the first term, successfully seeking a seat in the Senate.

The second election for the Assembly was held on 2 June 1979, and saw a change in name from the Legislative Assembly to the House of Assembly. The election saw the addition of a fourth party, with the conservative Family Team led by Bev Cains winning a seat. It also saw the election of future self-government ministers Greg Cornwell and Paul Whalan.

A third election was held on 5 June 1982, which saw the introduction of a more partisan system. The offices of Leader of the House and Minority Leader were established. The Liberals held a majority in the Assembly and their leader Leedman became Leader of the House. Initially Labor, who opposed creating the offices refused to take on the office of Minority Leader, with both candidates nominated declining. However, a new Labor leader in Ken Doyle did eventually assume the position. He was to be short-lived as leader, with Maurene Horder succeeding him after only two years. The last Assembly also saw the creation of an office of Speaker, filled by independent MHA Harold Hird. The final election also saw the election of future Liberal Chief Minister Trevor Kaine. It was allowed to expire in 1986 due to plans to introduce full self-government for the territory. The House of Assembly had its final meeting on 17 June 1986 and was officially dissolved on 30 June 1986.

After some years of discussions, the House of Assembly was replaced with the current Legislative Assembly in 1989, with new Labor leader Rosemary Follett becoming the first Chief Minister of the Australian Capital Territory.

Many prominent House of Assembly figures retired rather than contest the elections for the new Legislative Assembly in 1989; several others, including outgoing Speaker Harold Hird and Family Team leader Bev Cains were soundly defeated. Three MHAs, however—Greg Cornwell, Trevor Kaine, and Paul Whalan—went on to be elected to the new parliament, and later served in major roles.

== Election results ==
=== 1974 ===
Legislative Assembly (STV/PR)
Party	Votes	%	Swing	Seats	Change
Liberal		30.8	+17.3	7	
Labor		22.2	−6.0	4	
Australia		4.6		2	
ACT Women Voters				0	Steady
Independents				5	
Formal votes		93.0			
Informal votes		7.0			
Total		100.0			
Registered voters / turnout		92.0			

=== 1979 ===
House of Assembly (STV/PR)
Party	Votes	%	Swing	Seats	Change
Labor		37.4	+15.2	8	▲4
Liberal		18.5	–12.3	4	▼3
Democrats		6.5	+6.5	2	▲2
Family Team				1	▲1
Unemployed Workers Union				0	Steady
Independents				3	▼1
Formal votes		90.0	–2.0		
Informal votes		10.0	+7.0		
Total		100.0			
Registered voters / turnout		90.0	–2.0		

=== 1982 ===
House of Assembly (STV/PR)
Party	Votes	%	Swing	Seats	Change
Labor				8	Steady
Liberal				5	▲1
Family Team				2	▲1
Democrats				1	▼1
Independents				2	▼1
Formal votes					
Informal votes					
Total					
Registered voters / turnout					

== Electorates ==
- Canberra
- Fraser

== Members ==
- Members of the Australian Capital Territory Legislative Assembly, 1975–1979
- Members of the Australian Capital Territory House of Assembly, 1979–1982
- Members of the Australian Capital Territory House of Assembly, 1982–1986
