= 1949 Australian House of Representatives election =

This is a list of electoral division results for the Australian 1949 federal election.

== Overall ==
This section is an excerpt from 1949 Australian federal election § House of Representatives

Labor: 47 seats Liberal Party: 55 seats Country: 19 seats

House of Reps (IRV) — 1949–51—Turnout 95.97% (CV) — Informal 1.99%
Party	Votes	%	Swing	Seats	Change
Liberal–Country coalition	2,314,143	50.26	+6.61	74	+45
Liberal	1,813,794	39.39	+6.44	55	+37
Country	500,349	10.87	+0.17	19	+8
Labor	2,117,088	45.98	–3.73	48 (Note: Including Northern Territory)	+4
Communist	40,941	0.89	–0.60	0	0
Labor (Non-Communist)	32,870	0.71	–0.88	0	–1
Independents	99,368	2.16	+0.34	1 (Note: Including Australian Capital Territory)	–1
Total	4,604,410			123	+48
Two-party-preferred (estimated)
Liberal–Country coalition	Win	51.00	+5.10	74	+45
Labor		49.00	−5.10	47	+4

Popular vote
Labor	45.98%
Liberal	39.39%
Country	10.87%
Independent	2.16%
Communist	0.89%
Lang Labor	0.71%

Two-party-preferred vote (estimated)
Coalition	51.00%
Labor	49.00%

Parliament seats
Coalition	60.16%
Labor	39.84%

== New South Wales ==
1949 Australian federal election (New South Wales)
← 1946	10 December 1949	1951 →

All 47 NSW seats in the House of Representatives 24 seats needed for a majority
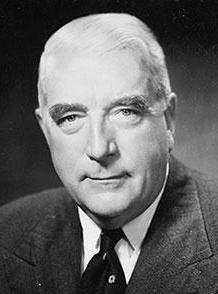

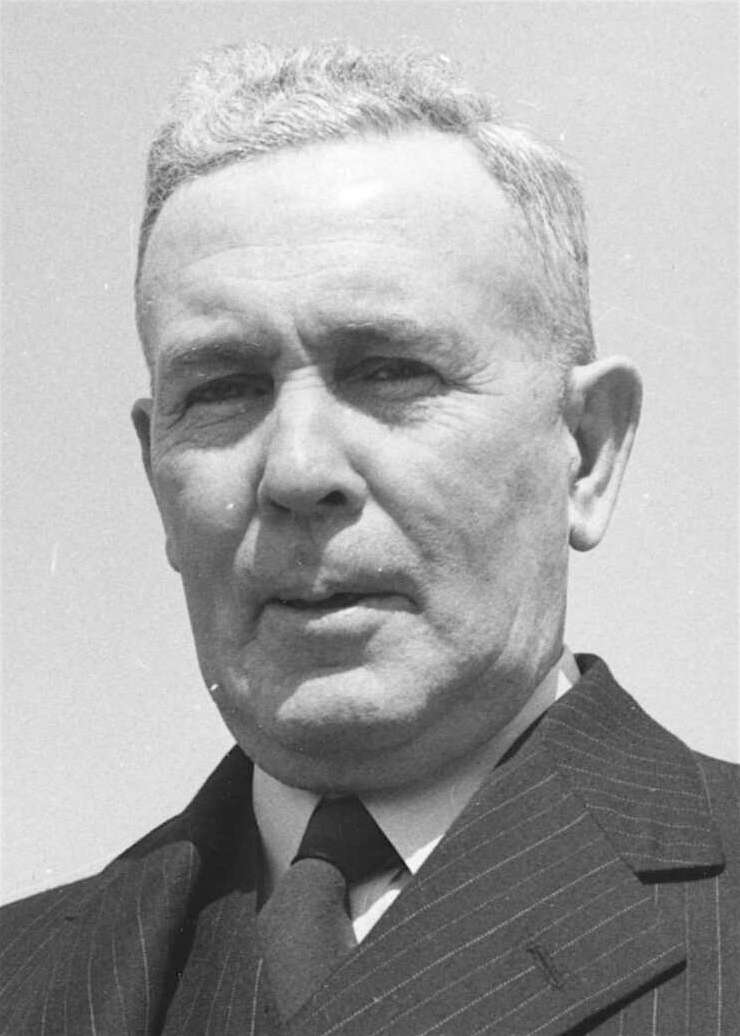

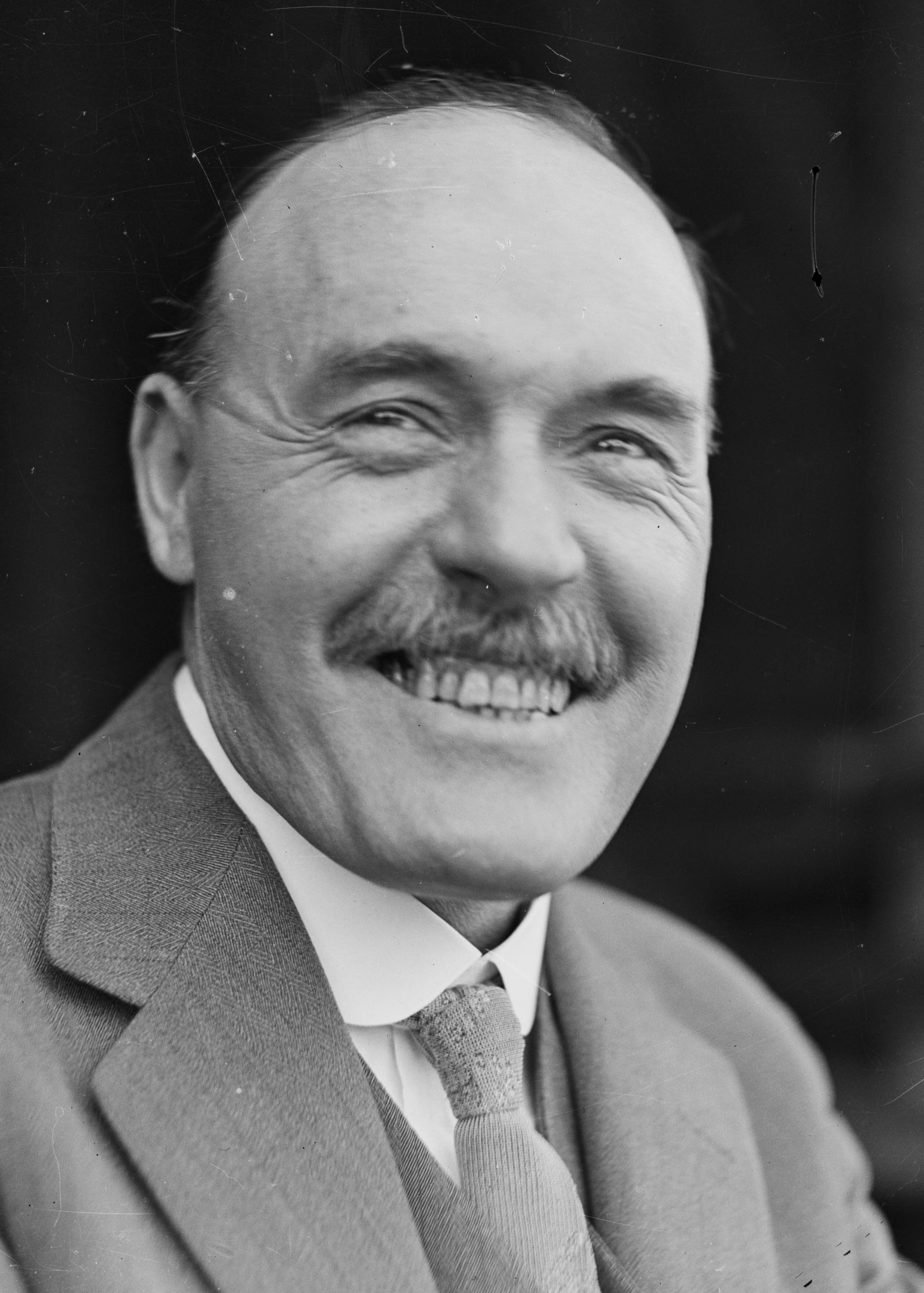
	First party	Second party	Third party
Leader	Robert Menzies	Ben Chifley	Jack Lang
Party	Coalition	Labor	Lang Labor
Seats before	8	19	1
Seats won	24	23	0
Seat change	▲16	▲4	▼1
Popular vote	871,675	832,153	32,870
Percentage	48.4%	46.4%	1.8%
Swing	▲7.7pp	▼5.0pp	▼2.2pp
TPP	49.2%	50.8%

=== Banks ===
This section is an excerpt from Electoral results for the Division of Banks § 1949

1949 Australian federal election: Banks
Party	Candidate	Votes	%	±%
Labor	Eric Costa	24,537	58.3	−3.8
Liberal	Howard Fletcher	15,371	36.5	+7.6
Lang Labor	Francis Foy	2,202	5.2	+5.2
Total formal votes		42,110	98.8	
Informal votes		941	2.2	
Turnout		43,051	95.5	
Two-party-preferred result
Labor	Eric Costa		62.2	−4.1
Liberal	Howard Fletcher		37.8	+4.1
Labor notional hold		Swing	−4.1	

=== Barton ===
This section is an excerpt from Electoral results for the Division of Barton § 1949

1949 Australian federal election: Barton
Party	Candidate	Votes	%	±%
Labor	Herbert Evatt	21,681	53.2	−13.0
Liberal	Nancy Wake	19,037	46.8	+13.0
Total formal votes		40,718	98.4	
Informal votes		653	1.6	
Turnout		41,371	98.0	
Labor hold		Swing	−13.0	

=== Bennelong ===
This section is an excerpt from Electoral results for the Division of Bennelong § 1949

1949 Australian federal election: Bennelong
Party	Candidate	Votes	%	±%
Liberal	John Cramer	23,568	59.6	+8.2
Labor	Raymond Watt	15,952	40.4	−8.2
Total formal votes		39,520	97.9	
Informal votes		849	2.1	
Turnout		40,369	96.5	
Liberal notional hold		Swing	+8.2	

=== Blaxland ===
This section is an excerpt from Electoral results for the Division of Blaxland § 1949

1949 Australian federal election: Blaxland
Party	Candidate	Votes	%	±%
Labor	Jim Harrison	19,403	49.3	+21.7
Lang Labor	Jack Lang	9,752	24.8	−15.0
Liberal	Thomas Handran-Smith	9,364	23.8	−7.7
Communist	Roy Kirby	865	2.2	+2.2
Total formal votes		39,384	98.0	
Informal votes		802	2.0	
Turnout		40,186	96.1	
Two-party-preferred result
Labor	Jim Harrison		53.4	+53.4
Lang Labor	Jack Lang		46.6	−13.9
Labor notional gain from Lang Labor		Swing	+53.4	

=== Bradfield ===
This section is an excerpt from Electoral results for the Division of Bradfield § 1949

1949 Australian federal election: Bradfield
Party	Candidate	Votes	%	±%
Liberal	Billy Hughes	28,428	71.4	−3.8
Labor	Ken Gee	8,645	21.7	−3.0
Independent	Edward Price	2,764	6.9	+6.9
Total formal votes		39,837	98.2	
Informal votes		722	1.8	
Turnout		40,559	95.8	
Two-party-preferred result
Liberal	Billy Hughes		74.9	−0.3
Labor	Ken Gee		25.1	+0.3
Liberal notional hold		Swing	−0.3	

=== Calare ===
This section is an excerpt from Electoral results for the Division of Calare § 1949

1949 Australian federal election: Calare
Party	Candidate	Votes	%	±%
Liberal	John Howse	21,399	57.0	+25.1
Labor	George Gibbons	16,139	43.0	−5.3
Total formal votes		37,538	98.8	
Informal votes		472	1.2	
Turnout		38,010	97.3	
Liberal hold		Swing	+6.4	

=== Cook ===
This section is an excerpt from Electoral results for the Division of Cook (1906–1955) § 1949

1949 Australian federal election: Cook
Party	Candidate	Votes	%	±%
Labor	Tom Sheehan	27,485	75.0	+2.7
Liberal	Gerald Davis	5,970	16.3	+3.9
Lang Labor	John Eldridge	1,920	5.2	−9.5
Communist	Mervyn Pidcock	1,276	3.5	−2.9
Total formal votes		36,651	96.9	
Informal votes		1,174	3.1	
Turnout		37,825	95.9	
Two-party-preferred result
Labor	Tom Sheehan		82.1	+8.7
Liberal	Gerald Davis		17.9	+17.9
Labor hold		Swing	+8.7	

=== Cowper ===
This section is an excerpt from Electoral results for the Division of Cowper § 1949

1949 Australian federal election: Cowper
Party	Candidate	Votes	%	±%
Country	Sir Earle Page	22,791	61.7	+0.9
Labor	Louis Jabour	14,134	38.3	+3.0
Total formal votes		36,925	98.9	
Informal votes		404	1.1	
Turnout		47,329	96.9	
Country hold		Swing	−1.0	

=== Cunningham ===
This section is an excerpt from Electoral results for the Division of Cunningham § 1949

1949 Australian federal election: Cunningham
Party	Candidate	Votes	%	±%
Labor	Billy Davies	22,795	60.7	+3.0
Liberal	Alan Thomson	11,892	31.7	+0.8
Communist	Eric Aarons	2,854	7.6	−4.7
Total formal votes		37,541	97.3	
Informal votes		1,047	2.7	
Turnout		38,588	95.7	
Two-party-preferred result
Labor	Billy Davies		68.2	+0.4
Liberal	Alan Thomson		31.8	−0.4
Labor notional hold		Swing	+0.4	

=== Dalley ===
This section is an excerpt from Electoral results for the Division of Dalley § 1949

1949 Australian federal election: Dalley
Party	Candidate	Votes	%	±%
Labor	Sol Rosevear	27,501	73.0	+9.6
Liberal	Charles Shields	10,190	27.0	−2.9
Total formal votes		37,691	97.1	
Informal votes		1,111	2.9	
Turnout		38,802	96.6	
Labor hold		Swing	+3.3	

=== Darling ===
This section is an excerpt from Electoral results for the Division of Darling § 1949

1949 Australian federal election: Darling
Party	Candidate	Votes	%	±%
Labor	Joe Clark	20,843	63.8	−2.7
Country	Elson Whyte	10,348	31.7	+9.7
Communist	Cecil Connors	1,017	3.1	+3.1
Independent	Madge Roberts	450	1.4	+1.4
Total formal votes		32,658	97.2	
Informal votes		929	2.8	
Turnout		33,587	94.7	
Two-party-preferred result
Labor	Joe Clark		67.3	−3.0
Country	Elson Whyte		32.7	+3.0
Labor hold		Swing	−3.0	

=== East Sydney ===
This section is an excerpt from Electoral results for the Division of East Sydney § 1949

1949 Australian federal election: East Sydney
Party	Candidate	Votes	%	±%
Labor	Eddie Ward	22,496	57.0	−4.8
Liberal	John Mant	15,398	39.0	+5.9
Independent	William Dalton	1,552	3.9	+3.9
Total formal votes		39,446	97.5	
Informal votes		1,015	2.5	
Turnout		40,461	95.5	
Two-party-preferred result
Labor	Eddie Ward		58.0	−6.3
Liberal	John Mant		42.0	+6.3
Labor hold		Swing	−6.3	

=== Eden-Monaro ===
This section is an excerpt from Electoral results for the Division of Eden-Monaro § 1949

1949 Australian federal election: Eden-Monaro
Party	Candidate	Votes	%	±%
Labor	Allan Fraser	19,004	50.9	−5.4
Liberal	Denzil Macarthur-Onslow	18,317	49.1	+15.0
Total formal votes		37,321	98.6	
Informal votes		517	1.4	
Turnout		37,838	96.6	
Labor hold		Swing	−6.6	

=== Evans ===
This section is an excerpt from Electoral results for the Division of Evans § 1949

1949 Australian federal election: Evans
Party	Candidate	Votes	%	±%
Liberal	Frederick Osborne	21,616	56.6	+5.6
Labor	Ronald Nicholls	16,588	43.4	−5.6
Total formal votes		38,204	98.1	
Informal votes		734	1.9	
Turnout		38,938	96.8	
Liberal notional hold		Swing	+5.6	

=== Farrer ===
This section is an excerpt from Electoral results for the Division of Farrer § 1949

1949 Australian federal election: Farrer
Party	Candidate	Votes	%	±%
Labor	Thomas McGrath	14,853	39.3	−7.0
Liberal	David Fairbairn	14,425	38.2	+20.4
Country	John Mackay	8,099	21.4	−14.1
Communist	Bill Gollan	419	1.1	+1.1
Total formal votes		37,796	98.3	
Informal votes		665	1.7	
Turnout		38,461	97.0	
Two-party-preferred result
Liberal	David Fairbairn	22,222	58.8	N/A
Labor	Thomas McGrath	15,574	41.2	N/A
Liberal notional gain from Country		Swing	N/A	

=== Grayndler ===
This section is an excerpt from Electoral results for the Division of Grayndler § 1949

1949 Australian federal election: Grayndler
Party	Candidate	Votes	%	±%
Labor	Fred Daly	25,622	67.1	+5.2
Liberal	Donald Clark	11,299	29.6	+11.5
Communist	Henry McPhillips	920	2.4	−1.8
Republican	William McCristal	349	0.9	+0.9
Total formal votes		38,190	97.3	
Informal votes		1,057	2.7	
Turnout		39,247	96.4	
Two-party-preferred result
Labor	Fred Daly		69.7	−6.9
Liberal	Donald Clark		30.3	+6.9
Labor notional hold		Swing	−6.9	

=== Gwydir ===
This section is an excerpt from Electoral results for the Division of Gwydir § 1949

1949 Australian federal election: Gwydir
Party	Candidate	Votes	%	±%
Country	Thomas Treloar	20,018	55.1	+17.4
Labor	William Scully	16,282	44.9	−3.5
Total formal votes		36,300	99.1	
Informal votes		346	0.9	
Turnout		36,646	95.8	
Country gain from Labor		Swing	+9.2	

=== Hume ===
This section is an excerpt from Electoral results for the Division of Hume § 1949

1949 Australian federal election: Hume
Party	Candidate	Votes	%	±%
Country	Charles Anderson	18,871	51.0	+18.8
Labor	Arthur Fuller	18,104	49.0	−4.2
Total formal votes		36,975	98.9	
Informal votes		428	1.1	
Turnout		37,403	96.3	
Country gain from Labor		Swing	+5.9	

=== Hunter ===
This section is an excerpt from Electoral results for the Division of Hunter § 1949

1949 Australian federal election: Hunter
Party	Candidate	Votes	%	±%
Labor	Rowley James	26,704	68.6	−14.4
Liberal	Ted Fletcher	8,502	21.8	+10.4
Communist	Evan Phillips	3,729	9.6	+9.6
Total formal votes		38,935	97.6	
Informal votes		964	2.4	
Turnout		39,899	97.2	
Two-party-preferred result
Labor	Rowley James		77.3	−9.7
Liberal	Ted Fletcher		32.7	+9.7
Labor hold		Swing	−9.7	

=== Kingsford Smith ===
This section is an excerpt from Electoral results for the Division of Kingsford Smith § 1949

1949 Australian federal election: Kingsford-Smith
Party	Candidate	Votes	%	±%
Labor	Gordon Anderson	18,573	49.7	−4.3
Liberal	Charles de Monchaux	17,387	46.5	+9.5
Independent	Henry Crittenden	1,206	3.2	+3.2
Independent	Clare Peters	221	0.6	+0.6
Total formal votes		37,387	97.7	
Informal votes		883	2.3	
Turnout		38,270	96.5	
Two-party-preferred result
Labor	Gordon Anderson	19,042	50.9	−7.6
Liberal	Charles de Monchaux	18,345	49.1	+7.6
Labor notional hold		Swing	−7.6	

=== Lang ===
This section is an excerpt from Electoral results for the Division of Lang § 1949

1949 Australian federal election: Lang
Party	Candidate	Votes	%	±%
Labor	Dan Mulcahy	20,421	50.2	+0.3
Liberal	Eric Willis	18,369	45.1	+9.1
Communist	Roy Boyd	1,905	4.7	−2.8
Total formal votes		40,695	98.0	
Informal votes		827	2.0	
Turnout		41,522	97.9	
Two-party-preferred result
Labor	Dan Mulcahy		54.7	−6.4
Liberal	Eric Willis		45.3	+6.4
Labor hold		Swing	−6.4	

=== Lawson ===
This section is an excerpt from Electoral results for the Division of Lawson § 1949

1949 Australian federal election: Lawson
Party	Candidate	Votes	%	±%
Labor	Alan Manning	15,969	43.0	−3.9
Country	Laurie Failes	11,531	31.0	−4.3
Liberal	Elwyn Croft	9,249	24.9	+18.6
Independent	William Ferguson	392	1.1	+1.1
Total formal votes		37,141	98.7	
Informal votes		476	1.3	
Turnout		37,617	96.6	
Two-party-preferred result
Country	Laurie Failes	20,773	55.8	+7.6
Labor	Alan Manning	16,408	44.2	−7.6
Country notional gain from Labor		Swing	+7.6	

=== Lowe ===
This section is an excerpt from Electoral results for the Division of Lowe § 1949

1949 Australian federal election: Lowe
Party	Candidate	Votes	%	±%
Liberal	William McMahon	20,489	52.7	+3.8
Labor	Hector McDonald	15,908	40.9	−8.0
Independent Liberal	Edith Shortland	2,470	6.4	+6.4
Total formal votes		38,867	98.0	
Informal votes		786	2.0	
Turnout		39,653	97.5	
Two-party-preferred result
Liberal	William McMahon		58.5	+9.0
Labor	Hector McDonald		41.5	−9.0
Liberal notional gain from Labor		Swing	+9.0	

=== Lyne ===
This section is an excerpt from Electoral results for the Division of Lyne § 1949

1949 Australian federal election: Lyne
Party	Candidate	Votes	%	±%
Country	Jim Eggins	10,212	27.7	+9.3
Labor	Edward Hayes	10,160	27.6	−8.8
Country	Philip Lucock	6,984	19.0	+19.0
Country	Eric Mackay	6,111	16.6	+16.6
Country	Francis Hain	2,296	6.2	+6.2
Independent	Joe Cordner	1,057	2.9	+2.9
Total formal votes		36,820	96.8	
Informal votes		1,235	3.2	
Turnout		38,055	97.0	
Two-party-preferred result
Country	Jim Eggins	24,308	66.0	+4.1
Labor	Edward Hayes	12,512	34.0	−4.1
Country notional hold		Swing	+4.1	

=== Macarthur ===
This section is an excerpt from Electoral results for the Division of Macarthur § 1949

1949 Australian federal election: Macarthur
Party	Candidate	Votes	%	±%
Liberal	Jeff Bate	25,184	64.6	+16.6
Labor	William McDonnell	13,776	35.4	−9.1
Total formal votes		38,960	98.3	
Informal votes		689	1.7	
Turnout		39,649	95.9	
Liberal notional hold		Swing	+12.2	

=== Mackellar ===
This section is an excerpt from Electoral results for the Division of Mackellar § 1949

1949 Australian federal election: Mackellar
Party	Candidate	Votes	%	±%
Liberal	Bill Wentworth	25,678	62.6	+7.2
Labor	James Mitchell	15,314	37.4	−7.2
Total formal votes		40,992	97.5	
Informal votes		1,068	2.5	
Turnout		42,060	96.2	
Liberal notional hold		Swing	+7.2	

=== Macquarie ===
This section is an excerpt from Electoral results for the Division of Macquarie § 1949

1949 Australian federal election: Macquarie
Party	Candidate	Votes	%	±%
Labor	Ben Chifley	21,683	57.7	−5.1
Liberal	Bob Cotton	14,585	38.8	+13.3
Communist	John King	1,320	3.5	+3.5
Total formal votes		37,588	98.8	
Informal votes		441	1.2	
Turnout		38,029	97.6	
Two-party-preferred result
Labor	Ben Chifley		61.0	−4.4
Liberal	Bob Cotton		39.0	+4.4
Labor hold		Swing	−4.4	

=== Martin ===
This section is an excerpt from Electoral results for the Division of Martin § 1949

1949 Australian federal election: Martin
Party	Candidate	Votes	%	±%
Labor	William O'Connor	20,603	53.5	−1.9
Liberal	Frederick Mann	14,550	37.8	+8.2
Communist	Tom Dowling	1,847	4.8	+0.6
Lang Labor	Frank Moss	808	2.1	−3.8
Independent	Malinda Ivey	681	1.8	+1.8
Total formal votes		38,489	97.3	
Informal votes		1,057	2.7	
Turnout		39,546	97.3	
Two-party-preferred result
Labor	William O'Connor		59.6	−6.1
Liberal	Frederick Mann		40.4	+6.1
Labor hold		Swing	−6.1	

=== Mitchell ===
This section is an excerpt from Electoral results for the Division of Mitchell § 1949

1949 Australian federal election: Mitchell
Party	Candidate	Votes	%	±%
Liberal	Roy Wheeler	23,274	56.9	+17.0
Labor	Joseph White	17,643	43.1	−8.7
Total formal votes		40,917	97.7	
Informal votes		963	2.3	
Turnout		41,880	96.4	
Liberal notional gain from Labor		Swing	+12.8	

=== New England ===
This section is an excerpt from Electoral results for the Division of New England § 1949

1949 Australian federal election: New England
Party	Candidate	Votes	%	±%
Country	David Drummond	16,159	44.3	−16.0
Labor	William Wilson	13,515	37.0	−4.7
Country	Donald Shand	6,830	18.7	+18.7
Total formal votes		36,504	98.8	
Informal votes		427	1.2	
Turnout		36,931	96.2	
Two-party-preferred result
Country	David Drummond	22,417	61.4	+2.9
Labor	William Wilson	14,087	38.6	−2.9
Country hold		Swing	+2.9	

=== Newcastle ===
This section is an excerpt from Electoral results for the Division of Newcastle § 1949

1949 Australian federal election: Newcastle
Party	Candidate	Votes	%	±%
Labor	David Watkins	21,705	55.7	−1.4
Liberal	Harry Quinlan	15,529	39.9	+14.6
Communist	Laurie Aarons	1,257	3.2	−3.7
Independent	Grahame Bland	445	1.1	−1.2
Total formal votes		38,936	98.2	
Informal votes		711	1.8	
Turnout		39,647	97.8	
Two-party-preferred result
Labor	David Watkins		58.3	−10.8
Liberal	Harry Quinlan		41.7	+10.8
Labor hold		Swing	−10.8	

=== North Sydney ===
This section is an excerpt from Electoral results for the Division of North Sydney § 1949

1949 Australian federal election: North Sydney
Party	Candidate	Votes	%	±%
Liberal	William Jack	19,650	50.9	+3.3
Labor	Leo Haylen	16,094	41.7	−10.7
Independent	Patrick Williams	1,642	4.3	+4.3
Lang Labor	Norman Ferguson	1,642	3.1	+3.1
Total formal votes		38,591	97.9	
Informal votes		831	2.1	
Turnout		39,422	97.6	
Two-party-preferred result
Liberal	William Jack		53.3	+5.7
Labor	Leo Haylen		46.7	−5.7
Liberal gain from Labor		Swing	+5.7	

=== Parkes ===
This section is an excerpt from Electoral results for the Division of Parkes (1901–1969) § 1949

1949 Australian federal election: Parkes
Party	Candidate	Votes	%	±%
Labor	Les Haylen	19,966	51.8	−8.2
Liberal	Dick Dein	18,579	48.2	+8.5
Total formal votes		38,545	97.9	
Informal votes		826	2.1	
Turnout		39,371	97.0	
Labor hold		Swing	−7.8	

=== Parramatta ===
This section is an excerpt from Electoral results for the Division of Parramatta § 1949

1949 Australian federal election: Parramatta
Party	Candidate	Votes	%	±%
Liberal	Howard Beale	25,411	62.6	+7.2
Labor	Clement Jackson	15,211	37.4	−7.2
Total formal votes		40,622	98.2	
Informal votes		756	1.8	
Turnout		41,378	96.7	
Liberal hold		Swing	+7.2	

=== Paterson ===
This section is an excerpt from Electoral results for the Division of Paterson § 1949

1949 Australian federal election: Paterson
Party	Candidate	Votes	%	±%
Labor	Cecil Robinson	14,089	37.9	−7.8
Liberal	Allen Fairhall	11,189	30.1	+12.2
Country	Arsie Dorsman	5,293	14.2	+0.6
Country	John McGirr	3,842	10.3	+10.3
Country	Robert Clendinning	2,101	5.7	+5.7
Country	Ernest Slater	656	1.8	+1.8
Total formal votes		37,170	96.7	
Informal votes		1,267	3.3	
Turnout		38,437	97.4	
Two-party-preferred result
Liberal	Allen Fairhall	21,741	58.5	+58.5
Labor	Cecil Robinson	15,429	41.5	−8.6
Liberal notional gain from Labor		Swing	+8.6	

=== Phillip ===
This section is an excerpt from Electoral results for the Division of Phillip § 1949

1949 Australian federal election: Phillip
Party	Candidate	Votes	%	±%
Labor	Joe Fitzgerald	19,455	51.2	−7.8
Liberal	William Latimer	16,302	42.9	+3.4
Independent	Jessie Street	2,272	6.0	+6.0
Total formal votes		38,029	98.0	
Informal votes		762	2.0	
Turnout		38,791	96.3	
Two-party-preferred result
Labor	Joe Fitzgerald		55.7	−4.0
Liberal	William Latimer		44.3	+4.0
Labor notional hold		Swing	−4.0	

=== Reid ===
This section is an excerpt from Electoral results for the Division of Reid § 1949

1949 Australian federal election: Reid
Party	Candidate	Votes	%	±%
Labor	Charles Morgan	24,607	58.1	+9.8
Liberal	Jim Clough	12,304	29.0	+6.6
Lang Labor	Rupert Sheldon	5,467	12.9	−13.4
Total formal votes		42,378	97.8	
Informal votes		942	2.2	
Turnout		43.320	96.4	
Two-party-preferred result
Labor	Charles Morgan		67.8	
Liberal	Jim Clough		32.2	
Labor hold		Swing		

=== Richmond ===
This section is an excerpt from Electoral results for the Division of Richmond § 1949

1949 Australian federal election: Richmond
Party	Candidate	Votes	%	±%
Country	Larry Anthony	27,504	75.1	+6.0
Labor	Alexander Bryen	9,139	24.9	−6.0
Total formal votes		36,643	98.8	
Informal votes		441	1.2	
Turnout		37,084	96.2	
Country hold		Swing	+6.0	

=== Riverina ===
This section is an excerpt from Electoral results for the Division of Riverina § 1949

1949 Australian federal election: Riverina
Party	Candidate	Votes	%	±%
Country	Hugh Roberton	19,904	53.3	+18.0
Labor	Joe Langtry	16,880	45.2	−0.5
Communist	William Mitchell	560	1.5	+1.5
Total formal votes		37,344	98.8	
Informal votes		458	1.2	
Turnout		37,802	96.0	
Two-party-preferred result
Country	Hugh Roberton		53.5	+3.8
Labor	Joe Langtry		46.5	−3.8
Country gain from Labor		Swing	+3.8	

=== Robertson ===
This section is an excerpt from Electoral results for the Division of Robertson § 1949

1949 Australian federal election: Robertson
Party	Candidate	Votes	%	±%
Liberal	Roger Dean	21,617	54.2	+16.2
Labor	Thomas Williams	18,236	45.8	−6.9
Total formal votes		39,853	97.9	
Informal votes		858	2.1	
Turnout		40,711	96.4	
Liberal gain from Labor		Swing	+11.5	

=== Shortland ===
This section is an excerpt from Electoral results for the Division of Shortland § 1949

1949 Australian federal election: Shortland
Party	Candidate	Votes	%	±%
Labor	Charles Griffiths	21,921	54.4	−12.8
Liberal	Harold Daisley	10,513	26.1	+7.1
Independent	Alfred Boa	6,423	15.9	+15.9
Communist	Eugene Marshall	882	2.2	+2.2
Independent	Isabel Longworth	570	1.4	+1.4
Total formal votes		40,309	97.6	
Informal votes		996	2.4	
Turnout		41,305	97.3	
Two-party-preferred result
Labor	Charles Griffiths		64.1	−12.0
Liberal	Harold Daisley		35.9	+12.0
Labor notional hold		Swing	−12.0	

=== St George ===
This section is an excerpt from Electoral results for the Division of St George § 1949

1949 Australian federal election: St George
Party	Candidate	Votes	%	±%
Liberal	Bill Graham	19,987	52.0	+17.2
Labor	Joseph Nicholson	18,475	48.0	−12.1
Total formal votes		38,462	97.8	
Informal votes		847	2.2	
Turnout		39,309	97.3	
Liberal notional gain from Labor		Swing	+16.2	

=== Warringah ===
This section is an excerpt from Electoral results for the Division of Warringah § 1949

1949 Australian federal election: Warringah
Party	Candidate	Votes	%	±%
Liberal	Percy Spender	27,563	70.1	+1.6
Independent Labor	Bill Fisher	8,356	21.3	+21.3
Independent Labor	Norman Chadwick	3,315	8.4	+8.4
Total formal votes		39,234	98.4	
Informal votes		632	1.6	
Turnout		39,866	95.8	
Two-party-preferred result
Liberal	Percy Spender		71.1	+2.4
Independent Labor	Bill Fisher		28.9	+28.9
Liberal hold		Swing	+2.4	

=== Watson ===
This section is an excerpt from Electoral results for the Division of Watson (1934–1969) § 1949

1949 Australian federal election: Watson
Party	Candidate	Votes	%	±%
Labor	Dan Curtin	19,515	49.4	−5.9
Liberal	Stanley Card	15,147	38.3	+12.5
Independent Labor	Max Falstein	3,656	9.2	+9.2
Lang Labor	Harold O'Reilly	1,210	3.1	−3.1
Total formal votes		39,528	97.3	
Informal votes		1,079	2.7	
Turnout		40,607	96.5	
Two-party-preferred result
Labor	Dan Curtin		59.0	−3.5
Liberal	Stanley Card		41.0	+3.5
Labor hold		Swing	−3.5	

=== Wentworth ===
This section is an excerpt from Electoral results for the Division of Wentworth § 1949

1949 Australian federal election: Wentworth
Party	Candidate	Votes	%	±%
Liberal	Eric Harrison	28,821	75.1	+7.9
Labor	William McKell	9,533	24.9	−5.5
Total formal votes		38,354	98.2	
Informal votes		703	1.8	
Turnout		39,057	96.1	
Liberal hold		Swing	+6.8	

=== Werriwa ===
This section is an excerpt from Electoral results for the Division of Werriwa § 1949

1949 Australian federal election: Werriwa
Party	Candidate	Votes	%	±%
Labor	Bert Lazzarini	24,142	56.2	+1.6
Liberal	Ray Watson	18,787	43.8	+6.5
Total formal votes		42,929	97.8	
Informal votes		961	2.2	
Turnout		43,890	95.2	
Labor hold		Swing	−6.0	

=== West Sydney ===
This section is an excerpt from Electoral results for the Division of West Sydney § 1949

1949 Australian federal election: West Sydney
Party	Candidate	Votes	%	±%
Labor	Dan Minogue	17,732	49.8	−18.2
Lang Labor	Horace Foley	8,872	24.9	+16.6
Liberal	Basil Mottershead	7,235	20.3	+1.2
Communist	Stan Moran	1,786	5.0	+0.4
Total formal votes		35,625	96.8	
Informal votes		1,168	3.2	
Turnout		36,793	91.3	
Two-party-preferred result
Labor	Dan Minogue		55.7	−21.7
Lang Labor	Horace Foley		44.3	+21.7
Labor hold		Swing	−21.7	

== Victoria ==
1949 Australian federal election (Victoria)
← 1946	10 December 1949	1951 →

All 33 Victorian seats in the House of Representatives 17 seats needed for a majority
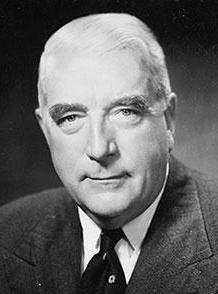

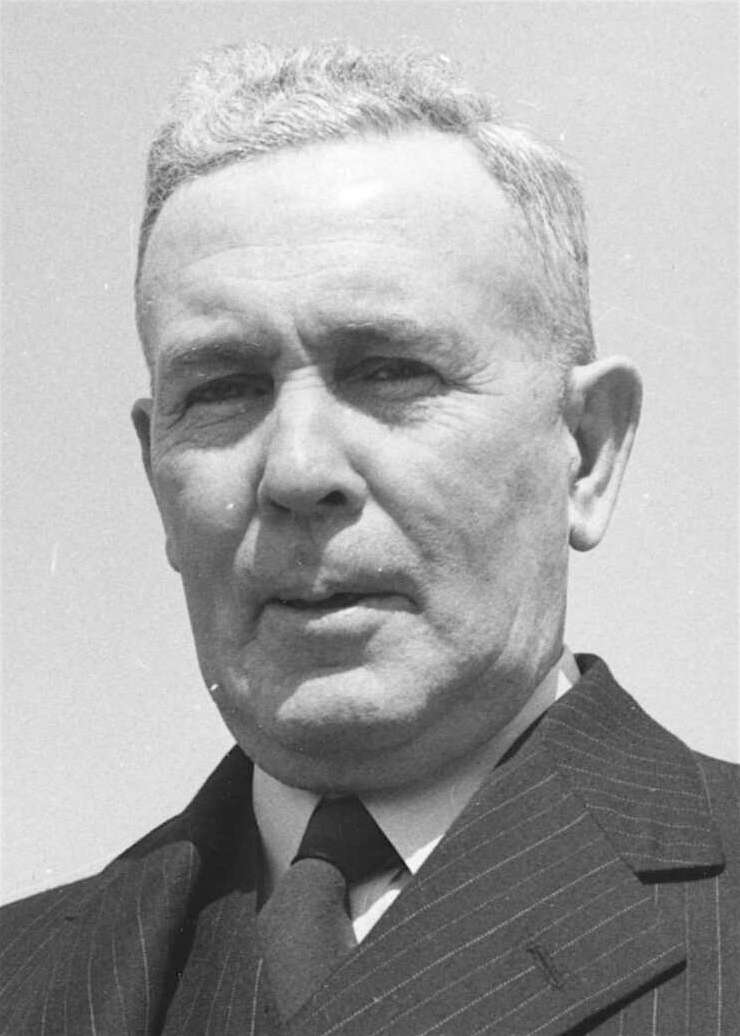
	First party	Second party
Leader	Robert Menzies	Ben Chifley
Party	Coalition	Labor
Seats before	11	8
Seats won	20	13
Seat change	▲9	▲5
Popular vote	641,404	592,000
Percentage	49.3%	46.7%
Swing	▲2.3pp	▼1.2pp
TPP	50.3%	49.7%

=== Balaclava ===
This section is an excerpt from Electoral results for the Division of Balaclava § 1949

1949 Australian federal election: Balaclava
Party	Candidate	Votes	%	±%
Liberal	Thomas White	26,157	63.9	+4.8
Labor	Martin Dunne	14,796	36.1	−4.8
Total formal votes		40,953	98.8	
Informal votes		512	1.2	
Turnout		41,465	96.3	
Liberal hold		Swing	+4.8	

=== Ballaarat ===
This section is an excerpt from Electoral results for the Division of Ballarat § 1949

1949 Australian federal election: Ballaarat
Party	Candidate	Votes	%	±%
Liberal	Alan Pittard	19,851	50.4	+3.1
Labor	Raymond Hyatt	19,522	49.6	−3.1
Total formal votes		39,373	99.0	
Informal votes		380	1.0	
Turnout		39,753	97.3	
Liberal gain from Labor		Swing	+3.1	

=== Batman ===
This section is an excerpt from Electoral results for the Division of Batman § 1949

1949 Australian federal election: Batman
Party	Candidate	Votes	%	±%
Labor	Alan Bird	22,662	58.4	+4.3
Liberal	Neil McKay	16,139	41.6	+3.3
Total formal votes		38,801	98.6	
Informal votes		544	1.4	
Turnout		39,345	95.9	
Labor hold		Swing	−1.1	

=== Bendigo ===
This section is an excerpt from Electoral results for the Division of Bendigo § 1949

1949 Australian federal election: Bendigo
Party	Candidate	Votes	%	±%
Liberal	Thomas Grigg	19,268	47.7	+24.2
Labor	Percy Clarey	18,962	47.0	−5.0
Independent	Allan Goodman	2,134	5.3	+5.3
Total formal votes		40,364	98.6	
Informal votes		554	1.4	
Turnout		40,918	96.5	
Two-party-preferred result
Labor	Percy Clarey	20,258	50.2	−4.1
Liberal	Thomas Grigg	20,106	49.8	+4.1
Labor gain from Country		Swing	14.1	

=== Burke ===
This section is an excerpt from Electoral results for the Division of Burke (1949–1955) § 1949

1949 Australian federal election: Burke
Party	Candidate	Votes	%	±%
Labor	Ted Peters	24,362	62.1	+11.1
Liberal	Alfred Wall	9,865	25.2	+2.4
Blackburn-Mutton Labor	Henry Hodges	4,720	12.0	+12.0
Independent	James Whitworth	271	0.7	+0.7
Total formal votes		39,218	97.5	
Informal votes		999	2.5	
Turnout		40,217	95.8	
Two-party-preferred result
Labor	Ted Peters		69.4	−0.7
Liberal	Alfred Wall		30.6	+0.7
Labor notional hold		Swing	−0.7	

=== Chisholm ===
This section is an excerpt from Electoral results for the Division of Chisholm § 1949

1949 Australian federal election: Chisholm
Party	Candidate	Votes	%	±%
Liberal	Wilfrid Kent Hughes	26,628	64.7	+4.1
Labor	Leo Fennessy	13,615	33.1	+0.1
Communist	Bill Tregear	937	2.3	+2.3
Total formal votes		41,180	98.5	
Informal votes		648	1.5	
Turnout		41,828	96.7	
Two-party-preferred result
Liberal	Wilfrid Kent Hughes		64.9	+3.8
Labor	Leo Fennessy		35.1	−3.8
Liberal notional hold		Swing	+3.8	

=== Corangamite ===
This section is an excerpt from Electoral results for the Division of Corangamite § 1949

1949 Australian federal election: Corangamite
Party	Candidate	Votes	%	±%
Liberal	Allan McDonald	21,670	57.5	+1.1
Labor	Henry Stacpoole	14,936	39.6	−3.9
Independent	Elsie Brushfield	1,080	2.9	+2.9
Total formal votes		37,686	99.2	
Informal votes		286	0.8	
Turnout		37,972	97.0	
Two-party-preferred result
Liberal	Allan McDonald		60.0	+3.6
Labor	Henry Stacpoole		40.0	−3.6
Liberal hold		Swing	+3.6	

=== Corio ===
This section is an excerpt from Electoral results for the Division of Corio § 1949

1949 Australian federal election: Corio
Party	Candidate	Votes	%	±%
Liberal	Hubert Opperman	20,018	50.3	+7.4
Labor	John Dedman	19,783	49.7	−6.2
Total formal votes		39,801	99.2	
Informal votes		316	0.8	
Turnout		40,117	96.2	
Liberal gain from Labor		Swing	+6.7	

=== Darebin ===
This section is an excerpt from Electoral results for the Division of Darebin § 1949

1949 Australian federal election: Darebin
Party	Candidate	Votes	%	±%
Labor	Tom Andrews	24,719	62.7	+4.1
Liberal	Jack McColl	14,688	37.3	+5.9
Total formal votes		39,407	98.4	
Informal votes		655	1.6	
Turnout		40,062	97.1	
Labor notional hold		Swing	−2.7	

=== Deakin ===
This section is an excerpt from Electoral results for the Division of Deakin § 1949

1949 Australian federal election: Deakin
Party	Candidate	Votes	%	±%
Liberal	Frank Davis	23,517	55.6	+0.5
Labor	Rod Leeson	18,784	44.4	−0.5
Total formal votes		42,301	98.7	
Informal votes		575	1.3	
Turnout		42,876	94.7	
Liberal hold		Swing	+0.5	

=== Fawkner ===
This section is an excerpt from Electoral results for the Division of Fawkner § 1949

1949 Australian federal election: Fawkner
Party	Candidate	Votes	%	±%
Labor	Bill Bourke	20,228	50.0	+2.3
Liberal	Magnus Cormack	20,201	50.0	+1.8
Total formal votes		40,429	98.1	
Informal votes		782	1.9	
Turnout		41,211	95.2	
Labor hold		Swing	−0.8	

=== Flinders ===
This section is an excerpt from Electoral results for the Division of Flinders § 1949

1949 Australian federal election: Flinders
Party	Candidate	Votes	%	±%
Liberal	Rupert Ryan	21,096	54.8	+3.3
Labor	Robert Wilson	11,410	29.6	−18.9
Independent Labor	Andrew Hughes	6,018	15.6	+15.6
Total formal votes		38,524	98.7	
Informal votes		490	1.3	
Turnout		39,014	94.3	
Two-party-preferred result
Liberal	Rupert Ryan		63.6	+12.1
Labor	Robert Wilson		36.4	−12.1
Liberal hold		Swing	+12.1	

=== Gellibrand ===
This section is an excerpt from Electoral results for the Division of Gellibrand § 1949

1949 Australian federal election: Gellibrand
Party	Candidate	Votes	%	±%
Labor	John Mullens	20,519	51.3	−22.5
Liberal	William Massey	8,904	22.2	−4.0
Independent Labor	Angus Macdonald	6,323	15.8	+15.8
Independent	William Anderson	2,865	7.2	+7.2
Communist	John Arrowsmith	1,418	3.5	+3.5
Total formal votes		40,029	97.5	
Informal votes		1,011	2.5	
Turnout		41,040	97.1	
Two-party-preferred result
Labor	John Mullens		69.7	−4.1
Liberal	William Massey		30.3	+4.1
Labor notional hold		Swing	−4.1	

=== Gippsland ===
This section is an excerpt from Electoral results for the Division of Gippsland § 1949

1949 Australian federal election: Gippsland
Party	Candidate	Votes	%	±%
Country	George Bowden	22,824	66.7	+6.6
Labor	Horace Hawkins	11,373	33.3	−2.4
Total formal votes		34,197	98.6	
Informal votes		472	1.4	
Turnout		34,669	96.2	
Country hold		Swing	+4.6	

=== Henty ===
This section is an excerpt from Electoral results for the Division of Henty § 1949

1949 Australian federal election: Henty
Party	Candidate	Votes	%	±%
Liberal	Jo Gullett	22,650	55.2	+4.1
Labor	Val Doube	17,548	42.7	−6.2
Lang Labor	Charles Dicker	858	2.1	+2.1
Total formal votes		41,056	98.8	
Informal votes		510	1.2	
Turnout		41,566	96.7	
Two-party-preferred result
Liberal	Jo Gullett		55.4	+4.3
Labor	Val Doube		44.6	−4.3
Liberal hold		Swing	+4.3	

=== Higgins ===
This section is an excerpt from Electoral results for the Division of Higgins § 1949

1949 Australian federal election: Higgins
Party	Candidate	Votes	%	±%
Liberal	Harold Holt	26,018	66.8	+6.8
Labor	Jules Meltzer	12,909	33.2	−3.7
Total formal votes		38,927	98.4	
Informal votes		621	1.6	
Turnout		39,548	94.7	
Liberal notional hold		Swing	+5.4	

=== Higinbotham ===
This section is an excerpt from Electoral results for the Division of Higinbotham § 1949

1949 Australian federal election: Higinbotham
Party	Candidate	Votes	%	±%
Liberal	Frank Timson	22,832	53.6	+1.2
Labor	Frank Field	19,760	46.4	−1.2
Total formal votes		42,592	98.8	
Informal votes		512	1.2	
Turnout		43,104	96.4	
Liberal notional hold		Swing	+1.2	

=== Hoddle ===
This section is an excerpt from Electoral results for the Division of Hoddle § 1949

1949 Australian federal election: Hoddle
Party	Candidate	Votes	%	±%
Labor	Jack Cremean	28,351	77.1	+1.3
Liberal	Terence Kirby	6,593	17.9	−3.3
Communist	Leslie Loye	1,137	3.1	+0.0
Independent	Albert Wallace	689	1.9	+1.9
Total formal votes		36,770	96.4	
Informal votes		1,382	3.6	
Turnout		38,152	94.4	
Two-party-preferred result
Labor	Jack Cremean		80.8	−2.3
Liberal	Terence Kirby		19.2	+2.3
Labor notional hold		Swing	−2.3	

=== Indi ===
This section is an excerpt from Electoral results for the Division of Indi § 1949

1949 Australian federal election: Indi
Party	Candidate	Votes	%	±%
Labor	Charles Edmondson	13,626	36.7	+1.9
Liberal	William Bostock	12,377	33.3	+33.3
Country	Clive Nason	11,157	30.0	−35.2
Total formal votes		37,160	98.9	
Informal votes		412	1.1	
Turnout		37,572	96.7	
Two-party-preferred result
Liberal	William Bostock	22,182	59.7	+59.7
Labor	Charles Edmondson	14,978	40.3	+40.3
Liberal gain from Country		Swing	+59.7	

=== Isaacs ===
This section is an excerpt from Electoral results for the Division of Isaacs (1949–1969) § 1949

1949 Australian federal election: Isaacs
Party	Candidate	Votes	%	±%
Liberal	William Haworth	21,260	54.0	+1.7
Labor	John Bourke	18,100	46.0	−1.4
Total formal votes		39,360	98.1	
Informal votes		747	1.9	
Turnout		40,107	94.4	
Liberal notional hold		Swing	+1.6	

=== Kooyong ===
This section is an excerpt from Electoral results for the Division of Kooyong § 1949

1949 Australian federal election: Kooyong
Party	Candidate	Votes	%	±%
Liberal	Robert Menzies	27,912	67.1	+4.8
Labor	Keith Ewert	13,691	32.9	+1.3
Total formal votes		41,603	98.9	
Informal votes		463	1.1	
Turnout		42,066	97.2	
Liberal hold		Swing	+4.2	

=== La Trobe ===
This section is an excerpt from Electoral results for the Division of La Trobe § 1949

1949 Australian federal election: La Trobe
Party	Candidate	Votes	%	±%
Liberal	Richard Casey	23,645	58.6	+4.1
Labor	Robert Balcombe	16,714	41.4	−4.1
Total formal votes		40,359	98.3	
Informal votes		698	1.7	
Turnout		41,057	94.6	
Liberal notional hold		Swing	+4.1	

=== Lalor ===
This section is an excerpt from Electoral results for the Division of Lalor § 1949

1949 Australian federal election: Lalor
Party	Candidate	Votes	%	±%
Labor	Reg Pollard	20,264	51.6	−5.4
Liberal	John Bellair	18,970	48.4	+5.4
Total formal votes		39,234	98.4	
Informal votes		619	1.6	
Turnout		39,853	94.5	
Labor notional hold		Swing	−5.4	

=== Mallee ===
This section is an excerpt from Electoral results for the Division of Mallee § 1949

1949 Australian federal election: Mallee
Party	Candidate	Votes	%	±%
Country	Winton Turnbull	22,658	64.6	+4.9
Labor	Alfred O'Connor	12,410	35.4	−4.9
Total formal votes		35,068	98.5	
Informal votes		533	1.5	
Turnout		35,601	96.2	
Country notional hold		Swing	+4.9	

=== Maribyrnong ===
This section is an excerpt from Electoral results for the Division of Maribyrnong § 1949

1949 Australian federal election: Maribyrnong
Party	Candidate	Votes	%	±%
Labor	Arthur Drakeford	26,639	61.9	−1.1
Liberal	George Hannan	14,675	34.1	−2.9
Prot. Christian Dem.	Colin Neyland	1,751	4.1	+4.1
Total formal votes		43,065	98.6	
Informal votes		603	1.4	
Turnout		43,668	97.1	
Two-party-preferred result
Labor	Arthur Drakeford		64.0	+1.0
Liberal	George Hannan		36.0	−1.0
Labor hold		Swing	+1.0	

=== McMillan ===
This section is an excerpt from Electoral results for the Division of McMillan § 1949

1949 Australian federal election: McMillan
Party	Candidate	Votes	%	±%
Labor	Adam Keltie	14,263	38.7	−3.6
Liberal	Geoffrey Brown	11,938	32.4	+6.5
Country	Bob May	9,714	26.4	−0.6
Communist	Bob Hamilton	912	2.5	−2.2
Total formal votes		36,827	98.0	
Informal votes		758	2.0	
Turnout		37,585	95.6	
Two-party-preferred result
Liberal	Geoffrey Brown	20,960	56.9	+6.1
Labor	Adam Keltie	15,867	43.1	−6.1
Liberal notional gain from Country		Swing	+6.1	

=== Melbourne ===
This section is an excerpt from Electoral results for the Division of Melbourne § 1949

1949 Australian federal election: Melbourne
Party	Candidate	Votes	%	±%
Labor	Arthur Calwell	24,187	64.5	−6.2
Liberal	Desmond McGinnes	9,366	25.0	−4.3
Independent	Charles McLaren	1,350	3.6	+3.6
Communist	Gerry O'Day	1,244	3.3	+3.3
Protestant Christian	Niven Neyland	794	2.1	+2.1
Lang Labor	Philip Wilson	576	1.5	+1.5
Total formal votes		37,517	96.0	
Informal votes		1,544	4.0	
Turnout		39,061	93.6	
Two-party-preferred result
Labor	Arthur Calwell		70.9	+0.2
Liberal	Desmond McGinnes		29.1	−0.2
Labor hold		Swing	+0.2	

=== Melbourne Ports ===
This section is an excerpt from Electoral results for the Division of Melbourne Ports § 1949

1949 Australian federal election: Melbourne Ports
Party	Candidate	Votes	%	±%
Labor	Jack Holloway	26,792	67.9	−2.5
Liberal	Frank Block	12,690	32.1	+2.5
Total formal votes		39,482	97.2	
Informal votes		1,137	2.8	
Turnout		40,619	94.6	
Labor hold		Swing	−2.5	

=== Murray ===
This section is an excerpt from Electoral results for the Division of Murray § 1949

1949 Australian federal election: Murray
Party	Candidate	Votes	%	±%
Country	John McEwen	23,778	63.5	+5.7
Labor	Desmond Devlin	13,650	36.5	+1.4
Total formal votes		37,428	98.4	
Informal votes		616	1.6	
Turnout		38,044	95.9	
Country notional hold		Swing	−1.4	

=== Wannon ===
This section is an excerpt from Electoral results for the Division of Wannon § 1949

1949 Australian federal election: Wannon
Party	Candidate	Votes	%	±%
Labor	Don McLeod	16,905	47.1	−4.6
Liberal	Dan Mackinnon	13,235	36.9	+9.1
Country	Helena Marfell	5,716	15.9	−1.5
Total formal votes		35,856	99.1	
Informal votes		312	0.9	
Turnout		36,168	97.8	
Two-party-preferred result
Liberal	Dan Mackinnon	18,203	50.8	+3.8
Labor	Don McLeod	17,653	49.2	−3.8
Liberal gain from Labor		Swing	+3.8	

=== Wills ===
This section is an excerpt from Electoral results for the Division of Wills § 1949

1949 Australian federal election: Wills
Party	Candidate	Votes	%	±%
Labor	Bill Bryson	18,918	44.2	+0.7
Liberal	Allan Tyrer	15,101	35.3	+3.3
Blackburn-Mutton Labor	Doris Blackburn	8,801	20.6	−2.7
Total formal votes		42,820	98.6	
Informal votes		613	1.4	
Turnout		43,433	96.4	
Two-party-preferred result
Labor	Bill Bryson	25,162	58.8	−2.7
Liberal	Allan Tyrer	17,658	41.2	+2.7
Labor notional hold		Swing	−2.7	

=== Wimmera ===
This section is an excerpt from Electoral results for the Division of Wimmera § 1949

1949 Australian federal election: Wimmera
Party	Candidate	Votes	%	±%
Liberal	William Lawrence	13,761	39.0	+17.5
Labor	Cyril Sudholz	11,184	31.7	−6.8
Country	Harrie Wade	10,343	29.3	−10.7
Total formal votes		35,288	99.1	
Informal votes		308	0.9	
Turnout		35,596	97.0	
Two-party-preferred result
Liberal	William Lawrence	22,894	64.9	+64.9
Labor	Cyril Sudholz	12,394	35.1	−5.6
Liberal gain from Country		Swing	+5.6	

=== Yarra ===
This section is an excerpt from Electoral results for the Division of Yarra § 1949

1949 Australian federal election: Yarra
Party	Candidate	Votes	%	±%
Labor	Stan Keon	23,211	58.8	−1.8
Liberal	Charles Barrington	14,189	35.9	+2.9
Communist	John Prescott	1,098	2.8	−3.1
Independent	Wenham Vines	991	2.5	+2.5
Total formal votes		39,489	97.5	
Informal votes		1,018	2.5	
Turnout		40,507	95.4	
Two-party-preferred result
Labor	Stan Keon		62.7	−3.7
Liberal	Charles Barrington		37.3	+3.7
Labor hold		Swing	−3.7	

== Queensland ==
1949 Australian federal election (Queensland)
← 1946	10 December 1949	1951 →

All 18 Queensland seats in the House of Representatives 9 seats needed for a majority
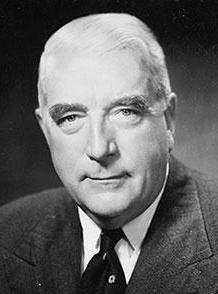

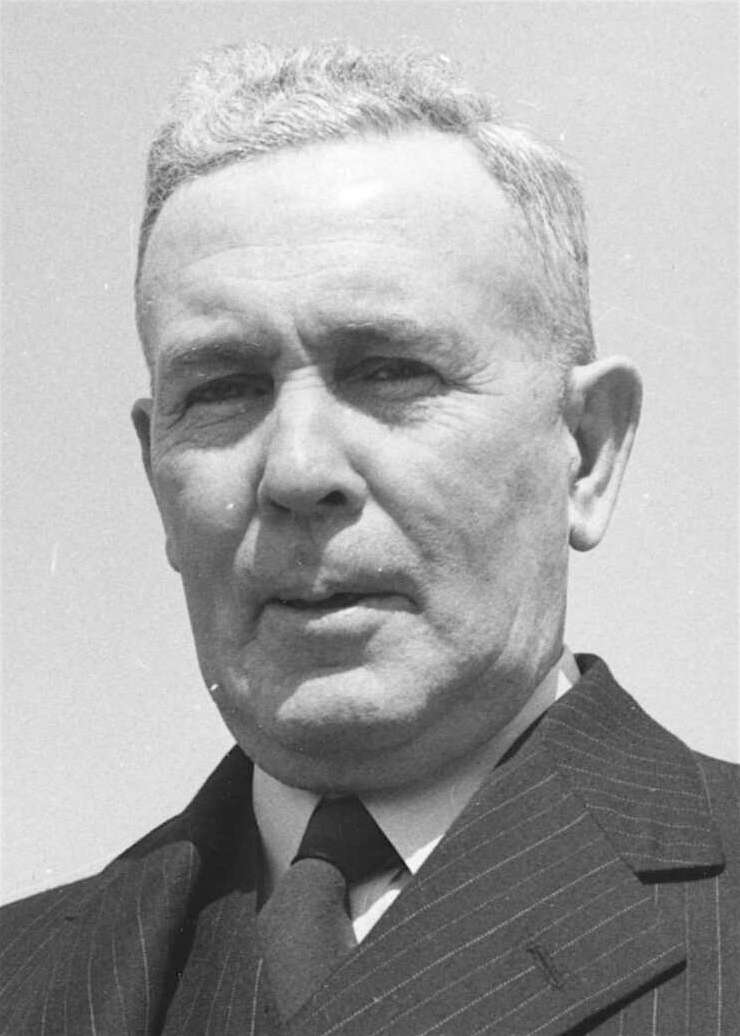
	First party	Second party
Leader	Robert Menzies	Ben Chifley
Party	Coalition	Labor
Seats before	5	5
Seats won	15	3
Seat change	▲10	▼2
Popular vote	263,336	254,949
Percentage	56.3%	39.5%
Swing	▲8.9pp	▼3.6pp
TPP	57.3%	42.7%

=== Bowman ===
This section is an excerpt from Electoral results for the Division of Bowman § 1949

1949 Australian federal election: Bowman
Party	Candidate	Votes	%	±%
Liberal	Malcolm McColm	20,090	53.4	+6.1
Labor	Wilfred Coutts	16,886	44.9	−7.8
Communist	Mabel Hanson	656	1.7	+1.7
Total formal votes		37,632	97.7	
Informal votes		877	2.3	
Turnout		38,509	95.4	
Two-party-preferred result
Liberal	Malcolm McColm		53.8	+6.5
Labor	Wilfred Coutts		46.2	−6.5
Liberal notional gain from Labor		Swing	−1.4	

=== Brisbane ===
This section is an excerpt from Electoral results for the Division of Brisbane § 1949

1949 Australian federal election: Brisbane
Party	Candidate	Votes	%	±%
Labor	George Lawson	18,890	52.3	−7.4
Liberal	James Long	15,269	42.3	+6.0
Communist	Alby Graham	1,954	5.4	+5.4
Total formal votes		36,113	97.3	
Informal votes		1,021	2.7	
Turnout		37,134	93.6	
Two-party-preferred result
Labor	George Lawson		57.3	−6.4
Liberal	James Long		42.7	+6.4
Labor hold		Swing	−6.4	

=== Capricornia ===
This section is an excerpt from Electoral results for the Division of Capricornia § 1949

1949 Australian federal election: Capricornia
Party	Candidate	Votes	%	±%
Liberal	Henry Pearce	16,949	52.2	−0.1
Labor	Mick Gardner	15,121	46.6	+2.1
Communist	Ted Robertson	413	1.3	+1.3
Total formal votes		32,483	98.5	
Informal votes		508	1.5	
Turnout		32,991	96.6	
Two-party-preferred result
Liberal	Henry Pearce		52.3	−2.3
Labor	Mick Gardner		47.7	+2.3
Liberal hold		Swing	−2.3	

=== Darling Downs ===
This section is an excerpt from Electoral results for the Division of Darling Downs § 1949

1949 Australian federal election: Darling Downs
Party	Candidate	Votes	%	±%
Liberal	Reginald Swartz	21,261	58.9	+58.9
Labor	James Kane	11,281	31.2	−5.0
Independent	Charles Farquharson	3,041	8.4	+8.4
Communist	Raymond Mullaly	281	0.8	+0.8
Independent	Charles Lacaze	260	0.7	+0.7
Total formal votes		36,124	98.4	
Informal votes		587	1.6	
Turnout		36,711	97.2	
Two-party-preferred result
Liberal	Reginald Swartz		62.5	+62.5
Labor	James Kane		37.5	−1.9
Liberal gain from Country		Swing	+1.9	

=== Dawson ===
This section is an excerpt from Electoral results for the Division of Dawson § 1949

1949 Australian federal election: Dawson
Party	Candidate	Votes	%	±%
Country	Charles Davidson	19,302	58.4	+12.3
Labor	George Burns	12,389	37.5	−5.3
Communist	Richard Andrew	1,379	4.2	−3.5
Total formal votes		33,070	98.0	
Informal votes		659	2.0	
Turnout		33,729	93.5	
Two-party-preferred result
Country	Charles Davidson		58.6	+9.8
Labor	George Burns		41.4	−9.8
Country notional gain from Labor		Swing	+9.8	

=== Fisher ===
This section is an excerpt from Electoral results for the Division of Fisher § 1949

1949 Australian federal election: Fisher
Party	Candidate	Votes	%	±%
Country	Charles Adermann	26,630	66.5	+5.3
Labor	Edmund Roberts	9,980	24.9	−2.2
Independent	Norman Logan	3,419	8.5	+8.5
Total formal votes		40,029	98.9	
Informal votes		453	1.1	
Turnout		40,482	94.9	
Two-party-preferred result
Country	Charles Adermann		70.7	+4.1
Labor	Edmund Roberts		29.3	−4.1
Country notional hold		Swing	+4.1	

=== Griffith ===
This section is an excerpt from Electoral results for the Division of Griffith § 1949

1949 Australian federal election: Griffith
Party	Candidate	Votes	%	±%
Liberal	Doug Berry	18,381	51.7	+1.3
Labor	William Conelan	16,464	46.3	−3.3
Communist	Anna Slater	727	2.0	+2.0
Total formal votes		35,572	96.8	
Informal votes		1,179	3.2	
Turnout		36,751	95.2	
Two-party-preferred result
Liberal	Doug Berry		51.9	+1.5
Labor	William Conelan		48.1	−1.5
Liberal hold		Swing	+1.5	

=== Herbert ===
This section is an excerpt from Electoral results for the Division of Herbert § 1949

1949 Australian federal election: Herbert
Party	Candidate	Votes	%	±%
Labor	Bill Edmonds	17,395	49.4	+1.0
Country	Doug Jeffrey	15,973	45.4	+13.0
Communist	Jim Henderson	1,847	5.2	−10.6
Total formal votes		35,215	96.8	
Informal votes		1,160	3.2	
Turnout		36,375	93.1	
Two-party-preferred result
Labor	Bill Edmonds	18,898	53.7	−10.4
Country	Doug Jeffrey	16,317	46.3	+10.4
Labor hold		Swing	−10.4	

=== Kennedy ===
This section is an excerpt from Electoral results for the Division of Kennedy § 1949

1949 Australian federal election: Kennedy
Party	Candidate	Votes	%	±%
Labor	Bill Riordan	15,127	55.1	−3.2
Country	Ulick Browne	11,397	41.5	+4.6
Communist	Eric Wyper	947	3.4	−0.4
Total formal votes		27,471	98.1	
Informal votes		533	1.9	
Turnout		28,004	89.3	
Two-party-preferred result
Labor	Bill Riordan		58.4	−3.7
Country	Ulick Browne		41.6	+3.7
Labor hold		Swing	−3.7	

=== Leichhardt ===
This section is an excerpt from Electoral results for the Division of Leichhardt § 1949

1949 Australian federal election: Leichhardt
Party	Candidate	Votes	%	±%
Country	Tom Gilmore	16,291	49.6	+8.0
Labor	Cecil Holdcroft	13,894	42.3	−11.2
Communist	Ralph Leinster	1,141	3.5	−0.7
Independent	Thomas Mackey	1,106	3.4	+3.4
Independent	Leslie Keough	424	1.3	+1.3
Total formal votes		32,856	95.8	
Informal votes		1,427	4.2	
Turnout		34,283	91.5	
Two-party-preferred result
Country	Tom Gilmore		51.7	+9.2
Labor	Cecil Holdcroft		48.3	−9.2
Country notional gain from Labor		Swing	+9.2	

=== Lilley ===
This section is an excerpt from Electoral results for the Division of Lilley § 1949

1949 Australian federal election: Lilley
Party	Candidate	Votes	%	±%
Liberal	Bruce Wight	22,488	59.4	+15.2
Labor	Jim Hadley	15,368	40.6	−4.2
Total formal votes		37,856	98.1	
Informal votes		727	1.9	
Turnout		38,583	94.1	
Liberal hold		Swing	+9.2	

=== Maranoa ===
This section is an excerpt from Electoral results for the Division of Maranoa § 1949

1949 Australian federal election: Maranoa
Party	Candidate	Votes	%	±%
Country	Charles Russell	18,652	59.6	+6.3
Labor	Martin Laracy	12,657	40.4	−1.6
Total formal votes		31,309	98.9	
Informal votes		335	1.1	
Turnout		31,644	93.8	
Country hold		Swing	+3.8	

=== McPherson ===
This section is an excerpt from Electoral results for the Division of McPherson § 1949

1949 Australian federal election: McPherson
Party	Candidate	Votes	%	±%
Country	Arthur Fadden	24,263	74.2	+46.6
Labor	John Hilton	8,436	25.8	−5.1
Total formal votes		32,699	98.4	
Informal votes		521	1.6	
Turnout		33,220	94.0	
Country notional gain from Liberal		Swing	+5.1	

=== Moreton ===
This section is an excerpt from Electoral results for the Division of Moreton § 1949

1949 Australian federal election: Moreton
Party	Candidate	Votes	%	±%
Liberal	Josiah Francis	25,125	61.4	+8.1
Labor	William Thieme	14,915	36.4	−5.6
Communist	Bill Yarrow	904	2.2	+2.2
Total formal votes		40,944	97.9	
Informal votes		867	2.1	
Turnout		41,811	95.2	
Two-party-preferred result
Liberal	Josiah Francis		61.6	+0.8
Labor	William Thieme		38.4	−0.8
Liberal hold		Swing	+0.8	

=== Oxley ===
This section is an excerpt from Electoral results for the Division of Oxley § 1949

1949 Australian federal election: Oxley
Party	Candidate	Votes	%	±%
Liberal	Donald Cameron	14,895	42.1	+8.9
Labor	Evan Marginson	14,268	40.3	+0.2
Country	John Martin	5,658	16.0	−11.0
Communist	Wallace Dawson	576	1.6	+1.6
Total formal votes		35,397	98.0	
Informal votes		726	2.0	
Turnout		36,123	96.7	
Two-party-preferred result
Liberal	Donald Cameron	20,097	56.8	−3.0
Labor	Evan Marginson	15,300	43.2	+3.0
Liberal notional hold		Swing	−3.0	

=== Petrie ===
This section is an excerpt from Electoral results for the Division of Petrie § 1949

1949 Australian federal election: Petrie
Party	Candidate	Votes	%	±%
Liberal	Alan Hulme	23,803	59.7	+14.6
Labor	Samuel Martin	14,593	36.6	−7.4
Independent	James Ryan	1,488	3.7	+3.7
Total formal votes		39,884	98.3	
Informal votes		683	1.7	
Turnout		40,567	94.5	
Two-party-preferred result
Liberal	Alan Hulme		61.6	+10.8
Labor	Samuel Martin		38.4	−10.8
Liberal notional hold		Swing	+10.8	

=== Ryan ===
This section is an excerpt from Electoral results for the Division of Ryan § 1949

1949 Australian federal election: Ryan
Party	Candidate	Votes	%	±%
Liberal	Nigel Drury	24,917	60.3	+17.3
Labor	Leonard Eastment	16,431	39.7	−6.6
Total formal votes		41,348	98.2	
Informal votes		755	1.8	
Turnout		42,103	94.3	
Liberal notional hold		Swing	+9.2	

=== Wide Bay ===
This section is an excerpt from Electoral results for the Division of Wide Bay § 1949

1949 Australian federal election: Wide Bay
Party	Candidate	Votes	%	±%
Country	Bernard Corser	22,037	56.5	+9.0
Labor	Samuel Round	10,941	28.0	−7.9
Independent	Robert McDowell	6,037	15.5	+15.5
Total formal votes		39,015	98.6	
Informal votes		572	1.4	
Turnout		39,587	96.7	
Two-party-preferred result
Country	Bernard Corser		64.3	+8.9
Labor	Samuel Round		35.7	−8.9
Country hold		Swing	+8.9	

== South Australia ==
1949 Australian federal election (South Australia)
← 1946	10 December 1949	1951 →

All 10 SA seats in the House of Representatives 5 seats needed for a majority
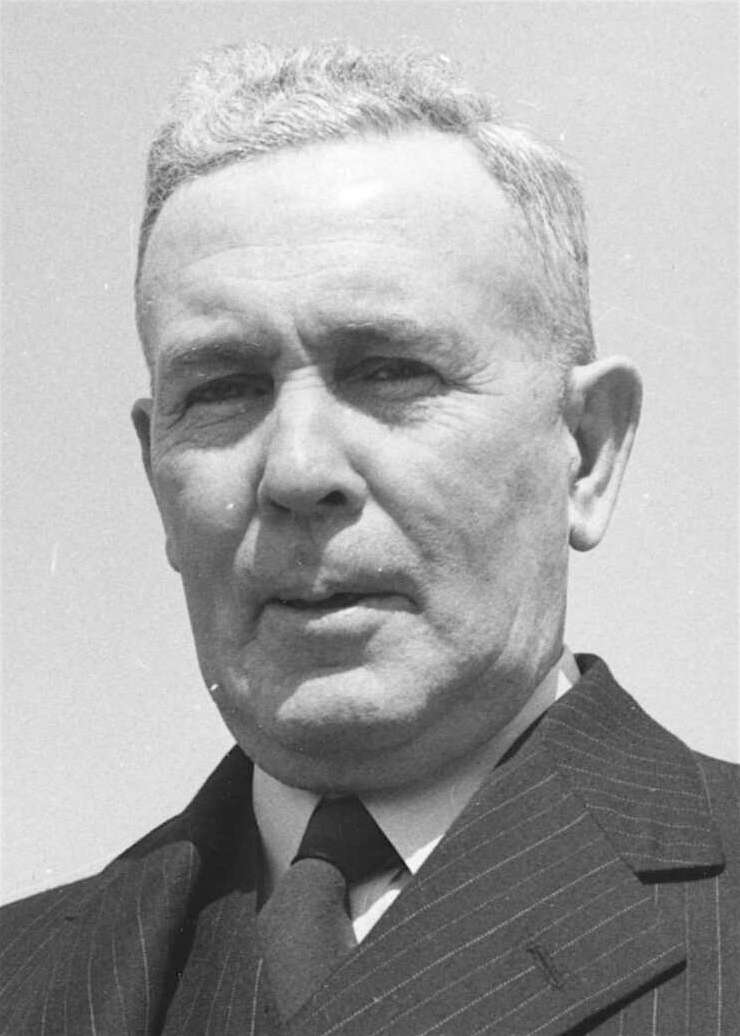

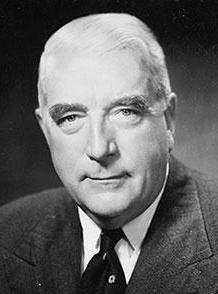
	First party	Second party
Leader	Ben Chifley	Robert Menzies
Party	Labor	Coalition
Seats before	4	2
Seats won	4	6
Seat change	Steady	▲4
Popular vote	204,277	200,215
Percentage	49.7%	48.7%
Swing	▼4.8pp	▲7.0pp
TPP	50.6%	49.4%

=== Adelaide ===
This section is an excerpt from Electoral results for the Division of Adelaide § 1949

1949 Australian federal election: Adelaide
Party	Candidate	Votes	%	±%
Labor	Cyril Chambers	23,823	59.8	−2.1
Liberal	Basil Harford	14,820	37.2	+3.8
Communist	Elsie Watt	683	1.7	−3.0
Independent	Christopher Doherty	504	1.3	+1.3
Total formal votes		39,830	96.9	
Informal votes		1,260	3.1	
Turnout		41,090	96.8	
Two-party-preferred result
Labor	Cyril Chambers		62.1	−4.0
Liberal	Basil Harford		37.9	+4.0
Labor hold		Swing	−4.0	

=== Angas ===
This section is an excerpt from Electoral results for the Division of Angas (1949–1977) § 1949

1949 Australian federal election: Angas
Party	Candidate	Votes	%	±%
Liberal	Alick Downer	23,987	60.8	+8.9
Labor	Albert Strachan	13,615	34.5	−10.3
Independent	Ralph Whittle	1,857	4.7	+4.7
Total formal votes		39,459	97.6	
Informal votes		965	2.4	
Turnout		40,424	97.2	
Two-party-preferred result
Liberal	Alick Downer		63.1	+8.1
Labor	Albert Strachan		36.9	−8.1
Liberal notional hold		Swing	+8.1	

=== Barker ===
This section is an excerpt from Electoral results for the Division of Barker § 1949

1949 Australian federal election: Barker
Party	Candidate	Votes	%	±%
Liberal	Archie Cameron	26,034	64.5	+11.6
Labor	John Klar	13,354	33.1	−9.6
Independent	John Gartner	1,004	2.5	+2.5
Total formal votes		40,392	98.3	
Informal votes		706	1.7	
Turnout		41,098	97.6	
Two-party-preferred result
Liberal	Archie Cameron		65.8	+10.8
Labor	John Klar		34.2	−10.8
Liberal hold		Swing	+10.8	

=== Boothby ===
This section is an excerpt from Electoral results for the Division of Boothby § 1949

1949 Australian federal election: Boothby
Party	Candidate	Votes	%	±%
Liberal	John McLeay	24,897	61.3	+9.3
Labor	Ralph Wells	15,714	38.7	−9.3
Total formal votes		40,611	97.9	
Informal votes		886	2.1	
Turnout		41,497	96.6	
Liberal hold		Swing	+9.3	

=== Grey ===
This section is an excerpt from Electoral results for the Division of Grey § 1949

1949 Australian federal election: Grey
Party	Candidate	Votes	%	±%
Labor	Edgar Russell	20,465	54.4	−6.1
Liberal	Edward Andrews	17,145	45.6	+6.1
Total formal votes		37,610	98.3	
Informal votes		656	1.7	
Turnout		38,266	95.5	
Labor hold		Swing	−6.1	

=== Hindmarsh ===
This section is an excerpt from Electoral results for the Division of Hindmarsh § 1949

1949 Australian federal election: Hindmarsh
Party	Candidate	Votes	%	±%
Labor	Clyde Cameron	29,260	69.7	+2.8
Liberal	Albert Turnbull	12,736	30.3	+6.4
Total formal votes		41,996	97.5	
Informal votes		1,096	2.5	
Turnout		43,092	97.1	
Labor hold		Swing	−5.4	

=== Kingston ===
This section is an excerpt from Electoral results for the Division of Kingston § 1949

1949 Australian federal election: Kingston
Party	Candidate	Votes	%	±%
Liberal	Jim Handby	23,713	51.6	+9.3
Labor	Thomas Sheehy	22,233	48.4	−7.6
Total formal votes		45,946	97.8	
Informal votes		1,057	2.2	
Turnout		47,003	97.1	
Liberal notional gain from Labor		Swing	+8.4	

=== Port Adelaide ===
This section is an excerpt from Electoral results for the Division of Port Adelaide § 1949

1949 Australian federal election: Port Adelaide
Party	Candidate	Votes	%	±%
Labor	Albert Thompson	31,977	71.5	+0.0
Liberal	Frederick Boscombe	11,879	26.5	+8.1
Communist	Peter Symon	889	2.0	−8.1
Total formal votes		44,745	97.9	
Informal votes		950	2.1	
Turnout		45,695	96.2	
Two-party-preferred result
Labor	Albert Thompson		73.3	−7.3
Liberal	Frederick Boscombe		26.7	+7.3
Labor notional hold		Swing	−7.3	

=== Sturt ===
This section is an excerpt from Electoral results for the Division of Sturt § 1949

1949 Australian federal election: Sturt
Party	Candidate	Votes	%	±%
Liberal	Keith Wilson	21,157	50.8	+7.2
Labor	Leslie McMullin	18,828	45.2	−8.8
Independent	Leonard Smith	1,628	3.9	+3.9
Total formal votes		41,613	97.4	
Informal votes		1,123	2.6	
Turnout		42,736	96.6	
Two-party-preferred result
Liberal	Keith Wilson		52.8	+8.9
Labor	Leslie McMullin		47.2	−8.9
Liberal notional gain from Labor		Swing	+8.9	

=== Wakefield ===
This section is an excerpt from Electoral results for the Division of Wakefield § 1949

1949 Australian federal election: Wakefield
Party	Candidate	Votes	%	±%
Liberal	Philip McBride	23,847	61.4	+8.3
Labor	Cyril Hasse	15,008	38.6	−7.2
Total formal votes		38,855	98.3	
Informal votes		681	1.7	
Turnout		39,536	97.4	
Liberal hold		Swing	+7.8	

== Western Australia ==
1949 Australian federal election (Western Australia)
← 1946	10 December 1949	1951 →

All 8 WA seats in the House of Representatives 4 seats needed for a majority
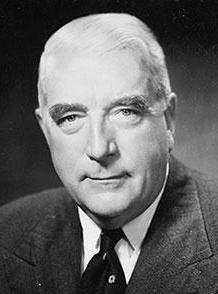

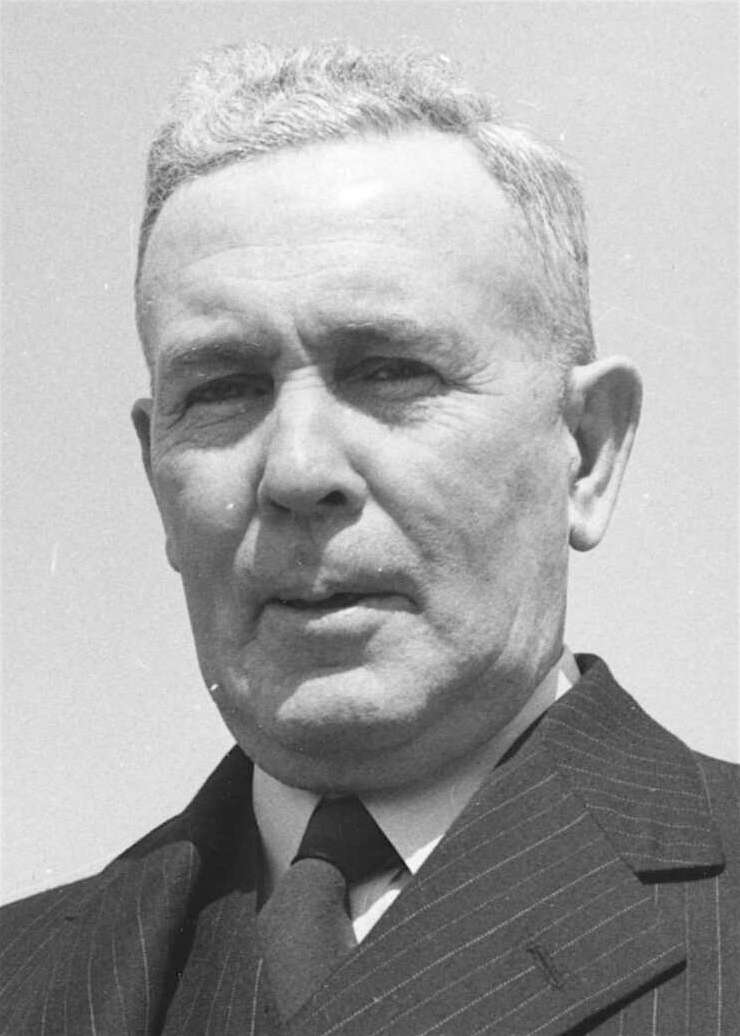
	First party	Second party
Leader	Robert Menzies	Ben Chifley
Party	Coalition	Labor
Seats before	1	4
Seats won	5	3
Seat change	▲4	▼1
Popular vote	156,670	133,701
Percentage	52.3%	45.4%
Swing	▲14.7pp	▼0.94pp
TPP	53.0%	47.0%

=== Canning ===
This section is an excerpt from Electoral results for the Division of Canning § 1949

1949 Australian federal election: Canning
Party	Candidate	Votes	%	±%
Country	Len Hamilton	12,159	36.8	−20.1
Liberal	William Gillespie	10,244	31.0	+31.0
Labor	Thomas Scaddan	10,002	30.3	−12.8
Independent Country	Arthur Neville	594	1.8	+1.8
Total formal votes		32,999	97.5	
Informal votes		842	2.5	
Turnout		33,841	95.6	
Two-party-preferred result
Country	Len Hamilton	17,640	53.5	−3.4
Liberal	William Gillespie	15,359	46.5	+46.5
Country notional hold		Swing	−3.4	

=== Curtin ===
This section is an excerpt from Electoral results for the Division of Curtin § 1949

1949 Australian federal election: Curtin
Party	Candidate	Votes	%	±%
Liberal	Paul Hasluck	24,857	61.2	+15.7
Labor	William Lonnie	15,781	38.8	−12.6
Total formal votes		40,638	98.1	
Informal votes		803	1.9	
Turnout		41,441	95.1	
Liberal notional gain from Labor		Swing	+13.8	

=== Forrest ===
This section is an excerpt from Electoral results for the Division of Forrest § 1949

1949 Australian federal election: Forrest
Party	Candidate	Votes	%	±%
Labor	Nelson Lemmon	15,935	43.8	−7.8
Country	Arnold Potts	10,003	27.5	+6.3
Liberal	Gordon Freeth	9,828	27.0	−0.2
Independent	James Bolitho	642	1.8	+1.8
Total formal votes		36,408	98.0	
Informal votes		749	2.0	
Turnout		37,157	97.5	
Two-party-preferred result
Liberal	Gordon Freeth	19,217	52.8	+4.4
Labor	Nelson Lemmon	17,191	47.2	−4.4
Liberal gain from Labor		Swing	+4.4	

=== Fremantle ===
This section is an excerpt from Electoral results for the Division of Fremantle § 1949

1949 Australian federal election: Fremantle
Party	Candidate	Votes	%	±%
Labor	Kim Beazley Sr.	22,463	54.7	−9.8
Liberal	Billy Snedden	17,918	43.6	+8.1
Communist	Paddy Troy	675	1.6	+1.6
Total formal votes		41,056	97.9	
Informal votes		862	2.1	
Turnout		41,918	96.4	
Two-party-preferred result
Labor	Kim Beazley Sr.		56.2	−8.3
Liberal	Billy Snedden		43.8	+8.3
Labor hold		Swing	−8.3	

=== Kalgoorlie ===
This section is an excerpt from Electoral results for the Division of Kalgoorlie § 1949

1949 Australian federal election: Kalgoorlie
Party	Candidate	Votes	%	±%
Labor	Herbert Johnson	18,127	62.4	−9.3
Liberal	John Porteus	10,902	37.6	+9.3
Total formal votes		29,029	97.8	
Informal votes		653	2.2	
Turnout		29,682	93.9	
Labor hold		Swing	−9.3	

=== Moore ===
This section is an excerpt from Electoral results for the Division of Moore § 1949

1949 Australian federal election: Moore
Party	Candidate	Votes	%	±%
Labor	Kevin Byrne	12,282	38.0	−7.0
Country	Hugh Leslie	12,244	37.8	−17.2
Liberal	Ken Jones	7,836	24.2	+24.2
Total formal votes		32,362	97.3	
Informal votes		894	2.7	
Turnout		33,256	94.5	
Two-party-preferred result
Country	Hugh Leslie	19,098	59.0	+4.0
Labor	Kevin Byrne	13,264	41.0	−4.0
Country notional hold		Swing	+4.0	

=== Perth ===
This section is an excerpt from Electoral results for the Division of Perth § 1949

1949 Australian federal election: Perth
Party	Candidate	Votes	%	±%
Labor	Tom Burke	18,412	47.8	−7.7
Liberal	Gordon Hack	17,858	46.4	+10.9
Independent	James Collins	1,756	4.6	+4.6
Communist	James Kelly	486	1.3	−2.3
Total formal votes		38,512	97.5	
Informal votes		992	2.5	
Turnout		39,504	94.9	
Two-party-preferred result
Labor	Tom Burke	19,294	50.1	−11.3
Liberal	Gordon Hack	19,218	49.9	+11.3
Labor hold		Swing	−11.3	

=== Swan ===
This section is an excerpt from Electoral results for the Division of Swan § 1949

1949 Australian federal election: Swan
Party	Candidate	Votes	%	±%
Liberal	Bill Grayden	22,821	52.4	+11.1
Labor	Harry Webb	20,699	47.6	−9.1
Total formal votes		43,520	97.7	
Informal votes		1,010	2.3	
Turnout		44,530	95.2	
Liberal gain from Labor		Swing	+10.2	

== Tasmania ==
1949 Australian federal election (Tasmania)
← 1946	10 December 1949	1951 →

All 5 Tasmanian seats in the House of Representatives 3 seats needed for a majority
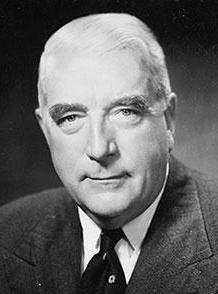

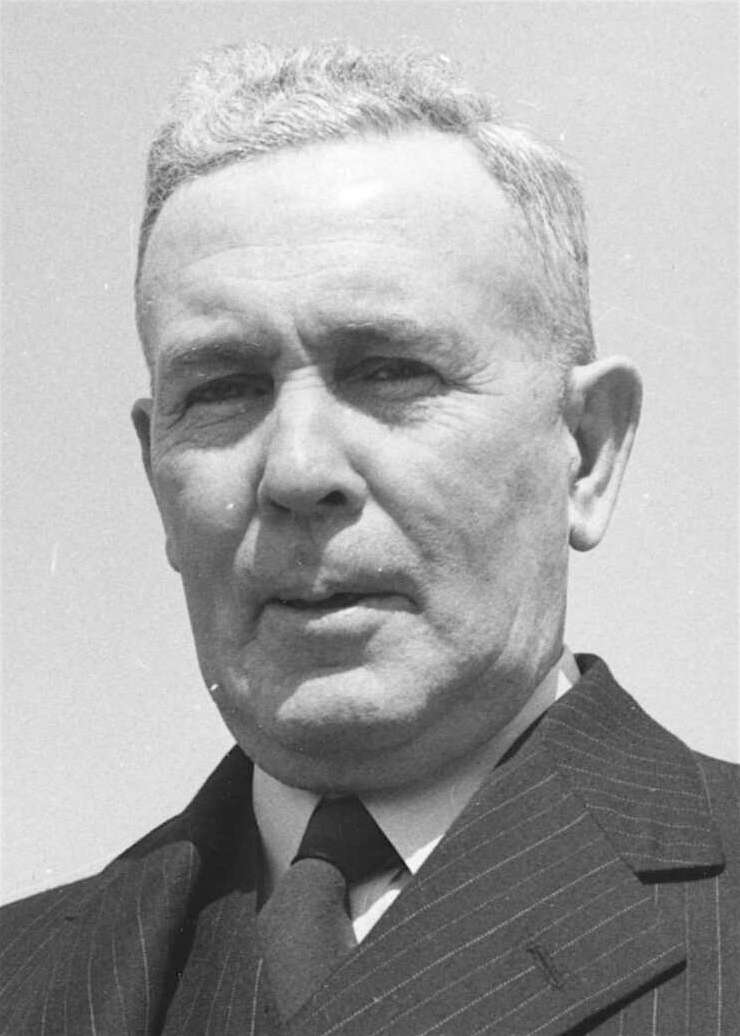
	First party	Second party
Leader	Robert Menzies	Ben Chifley
Party	Coalition	Labor
Seats before	2	3
Seats won	4	1
Seat change	▲2	▼2
Popular vote	80,748	70,248
Percentage	53.5%	46.5%
Swing	▲8.1pp	▼4.3pp
TPP	53.5%	46.5%

=== Bass ===
This section is an excerpt from Electoral results for the Division of Bass § 1949

1949 Australian federal election: Bass
Party	Candidate	Votes	%	±%
Liberal	Bruce Kekwick	15,686	50.6	+6.8
Labor	Claude Barnard	15,312	49.4	−6.8
Total formal votes		30,998	97.3	
Informal votes		865	2.7	
Turnout		31,863	96.9	
Liberal gain from Labor		Swing	+6.8	

=== Darwin ===
This section is an excerpt from Electoral results for the Division of Darwin § 1949

1949 Australian federal election: Darwin
Party	Candidate	Votes	%	±%
Liberal	Dame Enid Lyons	16,455	56.6	+3.3
Labor	Harold Kirkpatrick	12,602	43.4	−3.3
Total formal votes		29,057	97.6	
Informal votes		728	2.4	
Turnout		29,785	96.8	
Liberal hold		Swing	+3.3	

=== Denison ===
This section is an excerpt from Electoral results for the Division of Denison § 1949

1949 Australian federal election: Denison
Party	Candidate	Votes	%	±%
Liberal	Athol Townley	16,431	55.1	+10.9
Labor	Henry Cosgrove	13,394	44.9	−10.9
Total formal votes		29,825	98.0	
Informal votes		614	2.0	
Turnout		30,439	94.3	
Liberal gain from Labor		Swing	+10.9	

=== Franklin ===
This section is an excerpt from Electoral results for the Division of Franklin § 1949

1949 Australian federal election: Franklin
Party	Candidate	Votes	%	±%
Liberal	Bill Falkinder	17,644	58.0	+6.9
Labor	Jack Frost	12,790	42.0	−6.9
Total formal votes		30,434	97.4	
Informal votes		822	2.6	
Turnout		31,256	96.7	
Liberal hold		Swing	+6.9	

=== Wilmot ===
This section is an excerpt from Electoral results for the Division of Wilmot § 1949

1949 Australian federal election: Wilmot
Party	Candidate	Votes	%	±%
Labor	Gil Duthie	16,150	52.6	+0.9
Liberal	Rickman Furmage	14,532	47.4	−0.9
Total formal votes		30,682	96.7	
Informal votes		1,036	3.3	
Turnout		31,718	95.3	
Labor hold		Swing	+0.9	

== Territories ==
=== Australian Capital Territory ===
1949 Australian federal election (Australian Capital Territory)
10 December 1949	1951 →

Division of Australian Capital Territory
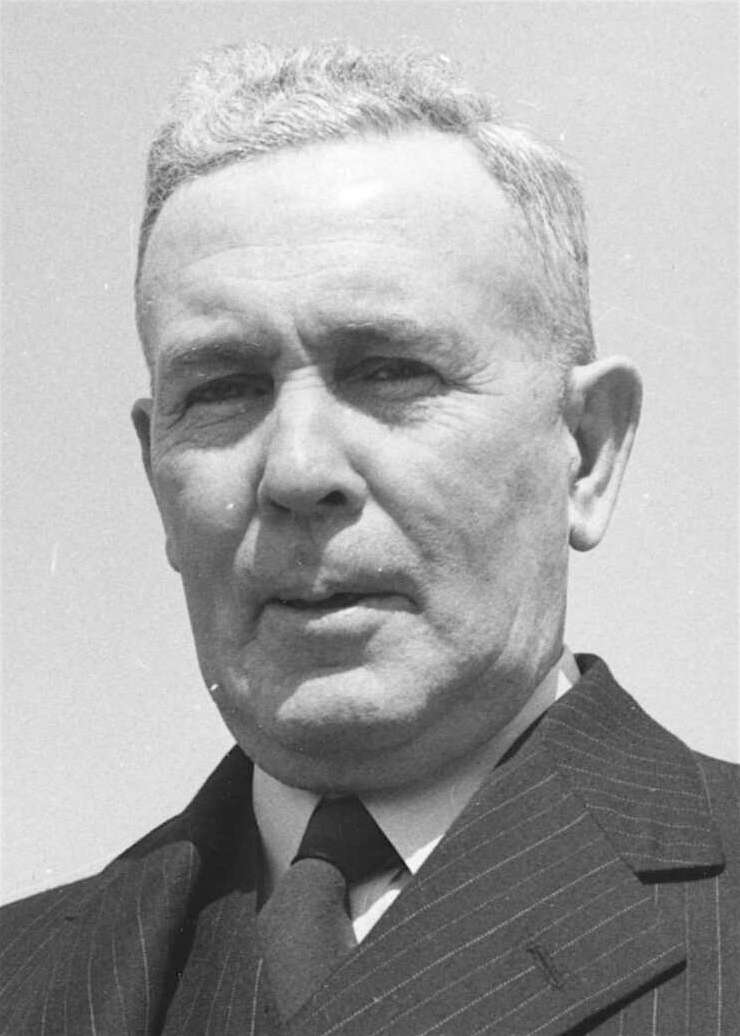

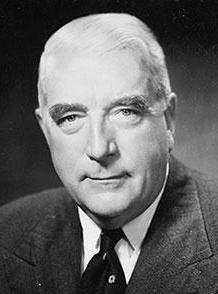
	First party	Second party
Leader	Ben Chifley	Robert Menzies
Party	Labor	Coalition
Seats won	0	0
Popular vote	4,823	2,510
Percentage	43.2%	22.5%
TPP	46.2%	—

This section is an excerpt from Electoral results for the Division of Australian Capital Territory § 1949

1949 Australian federal election: Australian Capital Territory
Party	Candidate	Votes	%	±%
Labor	Sidney Rhodes	4,823	43.2	+43.2
Independent	Lewis Nott	3,475	31.1	+31.1
Liberal	Malcolm Moir	2,510	22.5	+22.5
Independent	Jessie Ashton	366	3.3	+3.3
Total formal votes		11,174	99.4	
Informal votes		68	0.6	
Turnout		11,242	94.9	
Two-party-preferred result
Independent	Lewis Nott	6,013	53.8	+53.8
Labor	Sidney Rhodes	5,161	46.2	+46.2
Independent win		(new seat)		

=== Northern Territory ===
This section is an excerpt from Electoral results for the Division of Northern Territory § 1949

1949 Australian federal election: Northern Territory
Party	Candidate	Votes	%	±%
Labor	Jock Nelson	2,303	44.3	+21.9
Independent	Adair Blain	1,932	37.2	−5.2
Ind. (Non-Socialist) Labor	Victor Webster	961	18.5	+18.5
Total formal votes		5,196	97.7	
Informal votes		122	2.3	
Turnout		5,318	80.7	
Two-party-preferred result
Labor	Jock Nelson	2,737	52.7	+52.7
Independent	Adair Blain	2,459	47.3	−8.6
Labor gain from Independent		Swing	+8.6	

== See also ==
- Candidates of the 1949 Australian federal election
- Members of the Australian House of Representatives, 1949–1951
