= Candidates of the 1949 Australian federal election =

This article provides information on candidates who stood for the 1949 Australian federal election. The election was held on 10 December 1949.

Both the House of Representatives and the Senate were expanded at this election. All seats are designated as held by the party that held the notional majority after the redistribution.

== By-elections, appointments and defections ==
=== Defections ===
- In 1949, Labor MP Max Falstein (Watson) lost endorsement for the election. He was expelled from the Labor Party and sat as an independent.
- At the previous election, Charles Davidson had been jointly endorsed by the Liberal and Country parties to contest the seat of Capricornia, and had caucused with the Liberals in parliament. In 1949, he was endorsed instead by the Country Party to contest the new seat of Dawson, and subsequently sat as a Country Party member.

== Redistributions and seat changes ==
- Due to the expansion of the House, redistributions of electoral boundaries occurred in all states.
  - In New South Wales, nineteen new seats were created: the notionally Labor seats of Banks, Cunningham, Evans, Grayndler, Kingsford-Smith, Lawson, Lowe, Mitchell, Paterson, Phillip, Shortland and St George; the notionally Liberal seats of Bennelong, Bradfield, Macarthur and Mackellar; the notionally Country seats of Farrer and Lyne; and the notionally Lang Labor seat of Blaxland. The Liberal-held seat of North Sydney and the Lang Labor-held seat of Reid became notionally Labor.
    - The member for Martin, Fred Daly (Labor), contested Grayndler.
    - The member for North Sydney, Billy Hughes (Liberal), contested Bradfield.
    - The member for Reid, Jack Lang (Lang Labor), contested Blaxland.
    - The member for West Sydney, William O'Connor (Labor), contested Martin.
  - In Victoria, the Independent-held seat Bourke was renamed Burke, and became notionally Labor. Thirteen new seats were created: the notionally Labor seats of Darebin, Gellibrand, Hoddle, Lalor and Wills; the notionally Liberal seats of Chisholm, Higgins, Higinbotham, Isaacs and La Trobe; and the notionally Country seats of Mallee, McMillan and Murray. The Liberal-held seat of Fawkner and the Country-held seat of Bendigo became notionally Labor.
    - The member for Ballaarat, Reg Pollard (Labor), contested Lalor.
    - The member for Bendigo, George Rankin (Country), contested the Senate.
    - The member for Bourke, Doris Blackburn (Independent Labor), contested Wills.
    - The member for Fawkner, Harold Holt (Liberal), contested Higgins.
    - The member for Indi, John McEwen (Country, contested Murray.
    - The member for Wimmera, Winton Turnbull (Country), contested Mallee.
  - In Queensland, eight new seats were created: the notionally Labor seats of Bowman, Dawson and Leichhardt; the notionally Liberal seats of McPherson, Oxley, Petrie and Ryan; and the notionally Country seat of Fisher. The Labor-held seats of Griffith and Lilley became notionally Liberal.
    - The member for Capricornia, Charles Davidson (Country), contested Dawson.
    - The member for Darling Downs, Arthur Fadden (Country), contested McPherson, as part of a Coalition agreement that allocated Darling Downs to the Liberal Party.
    - The member for Maranoa, Charles Adermann (Country), contested Fisher.
  - In Western Australia, three new seats were created: the notionally Labor seat of Curtin; and the notionally Country seats of Canning and Moore. The Country-held seat of Swan became notionally Labor.
    - The member for Swan, Len Hamilton (Country), contested Canning.
  - In South Australia, four new seats were created: the notionally Labor seats of Kingston, Port Adelaide and Sturt; and the notionally Liberal seat of Angas. The Labor-held seat of Boothby became notionally Liberal.
    - The member for Boothby, Thomas Sheehy (Labor), contested Kingston.
    - The member for Hindmarsh, Albert Thompson (Labor), contested Port Adelaide.
  - There were minimal changes in Tasmania.
  - A new seat was created for the Australian Capital Territory.

== Retiring Members and Senators ==
=== Labor ===
- Frank Brennan (Batman, Vic)
- Frank Gaha MP (Denison, Tas)
- James Scullin MP (Yarra, Vic)
- Senator Joe Collings (Qld)

=== Liberal ===
- William Hutchinson MP (Deakin, Vic)

=== Country ===
- Joe Abbott MP (New England, NSW)

== House of Representatives ==
Sitting members at the time of the election are shown in bold text. Successful candidates are highlighted in the relevant colour. Where there is possible confusion, an asterisk (*) is also used.

=== Australian Capital Territory ===
Electorate	Labor candidate	Liberal candidate	Independent candidates
Australian Capital Territory	Sidney Rhodes	Malcolm Moir	Jessie Ashton; Lewis Nott*

=== New South Wales ===
Electorate	Held by	Labor candidate	Coalition candidate	Other candidates
Banks	Labor	Eric Costa	Howard Fletcher (Lib)	Francis Foy (LL)
Barton	Labor	**H. V. Evatt**	Nancy Wake (Lib)	
Bennelong	Liberal	Raymond Watt	John Cramer (Lib)	
Blaxland	Lang Labor	Eli Harrison	Thomas Handran-Smith (Lib)	Roy Kirby (CPA); **Jack Lang** (LL)
Bradfield	Liberal	Ken Gee	**Billy Hughes** (Lib)	Edward Price (Ind)
Calare	Liberal	George Gibbons	**John Howse** (Lib)	
Cook	Labor	**Tom Sheehan**	Gerald Davis (Lib)	John Eldridge (LL); Mervyn Pidcock (CPA)
Cowper	Country	Louis Jabour	**Sir Earle Page** (CP)	
Cunningham	Labor	Billy Davies	Alan Thomson (Lib)	Eric Aarons (CPA)
Dalley	Labor	**Sol Rosevear**	Charles Shields (Lib)	
Darling	Labor	**Joe Clark**	Elson Whyte (CP)	Cecil Connors (CPA); Madge Roberts (Ind)
East Sydney	Labor	**Eddie Ward**	John Mant (Lib)	William Dalton (Ind)
Eden-Monaro	Labor	**Allan Fraser**	Denzil Macarthur-Onslow (Lib)	
Evans	Labor	Ronald Nicholls	Frederick Osborne (Lib)	
Farrer	Country	Thomas McGrath	David Fairbairn* (Lib); John Mackay (CP)	Bill Gollan (CPA)
Grayndler	Labor	**Fred Daly**	Donald Clark (Lib)	William McCristal (RP); Henry McPhillips (CPA)
Gwydir	Labor	**William Scully**	Thomas Treloar (CP)	
Hume	Labor	**Arthur Fuller**	Charles Anderson (CP)	
Hunter	Labor	**Rowley James**	Ted Fletcher (Lib)	Evan Phillips (CPA)
Kingsford-Smith	Labor	Gordon Anderson	Charles de Monchaux (Lib)	Henry Crittenden (Ind); Clare Peters (Ind)
Lang	Labor	**Dan Mulcahy**	Eric Willis (Lib)	Roy Boyd (CPA)
Lawson	Labor	Alan Manning	Elwyn Croft (Lib); Laurie Failes* (CP)	William Ferguson (Ind)
Lowe	Labor	Hector McDonald	William McMahon (Lib)	Edith Shortland (Ind Lib)
Lyne	Country	Edward Hayes	Jim Eggins* (CP); Francis Hain (CP); Philip Lucock (CP); Eric Mackay (CP)	Joe Cordner (Ind)
Macarthur	Liberal	William McDonnell	Jeff Bate (Lib)	
Mackellar	Liberal	James Mitchell	Bill Wentworth (Lib)	
Macquarie	Labor	**Ben Chifley**	Bob Cotton (Lib)	John King (CPA)
Martin	Labor	**William O'Connor**	Frederick Mann (Lib)	Tom Dowling (CPA); Malinda Ivey (Ind); Frank Moss (LL)
Mitchell	Labor	Joseph White	Roy Wheeler (Lib)	
New England	Country	William Wilson	David Drummond* (CP); Donald Shand (CP)	
Newcastle	Labor	**David Watkins**	Harry Quinlan (Lib)	Laurie Aarons (CPA); Grahame Bland (Ind)
North Sydney	Labor	Leo Haylen	William Jack (Lib)	Norman Ferguson (LL); Patrick Williams (Ind)
Parkes	Labor	**Les Haylen**	Dick Dein (Lib)	
Parramatta	Liberal	Clement Jackson	**Howard Beale** (Lib)	
Paterson	Labor	Cecil Robinson	Robert Clendinning (CP); Arie Dorsman (CP); Allen Fairhall* (Lib); Greg McGirr (CP); Ernest Slater (CP)	
Phillip	Labor	Joe Fitzgerald	William Latimer (Lib)	Jessie Street (Ind)
Reid	Labor	Charles Morgan	Jim Clough (Lib)	Rupert Sheldon (LL)
Richmond	Country	Alexander Bryen	**Larry Anthony** (CP)	
Riverina	Labor	**Joe Langtry**	Hugh Roberton (CP)	William Mitchell (CPA)
Robertson	Labor	**Thomas Williams**	Roger Dean (Lib)	
Shortland	Labor	Charles Griffiths	Harold Daisley (Lib)	Alfred Boa (Ind); Isabel Longworth (Ind); Eugene Marshall (CPA)
St George	Labor	Joseph Nicholson	Bill Graham (Lib)	
Warringah	Liberal		**Percy Spender** (Lib)	Norman Chadwick (Ind Lab); Bill Fisher (Ind Lab)
Watson	Labor	Dan Curtin	Stanley Card (Lib)	**Max Falstein** (Ind Lab); Harold O'Reilly (LL)
Wentworth	Liberal	William McKell	**Eric Harrison** (Lib)	
Werriwa	Labor	**Bert Lazzarini**	Ray Watson (Lib)	
West Sydney	Labor	Dan Minogue	Basil Mottershead (Lib)	Horace Foley (LL); Stan Moran (CPA)

=== Northern Territory ===
Electorate	Held by	Labor candidate	Independent candidates
Northern Territory	Independent	Jock Nelson	**Adair Blain**; Victor Webster

=== Queensland ===
Electorate	Held by	Labor candidate	Coalition candidate	Communist candidate	Independent candidates
Bowman	Labor	Wilfred Coutts	Malcolm McColm (Lib)	Mabel Hanson	
Brisbane	Labor	**George Lawson**	James Long (Lib)	Alby Graham	
Capricornia	Liberal	Mick Gardner	George Pearce (Lib)	Ted Robertson	
Darling Downs	Country	James Kane	Reginald Swartz (Lib)	Raymond Mullaly	Charles Farquharson; Charles Lacaze
Dawson	Labor	George Burns	**Charles Davidson** (CP)	Richard Andrew	
Fisher	Country	Edmund Roberts	**Charles Adermann** (CP)		Norman Logan
Griffith	Liberal	**William Conelan**	Doug Berry (Lib)	Anna Slater	
Herbert	Labor	**Bill Edmonds**	Doug Jeffrey (CP)	Jim Henderson	
Kennedy	Labor	**Bill Riordan**	Ulick Browne (CP)	Eric Wyper	
Leichhardt	Labor	Cecil Holdcroft	Tom Gilmore (CP)	Ralph Leinster	Leslie Keough; Thomas Mackey
Lilley	Liberal	**Jim Hadley**	Bruce Wight (Lib)		
Maranoa	Country	Martin Laracy	Charles Russell (CP)		
McPherson	Liberal	John Hilton	**Arthur Fadden** (CP)		
Moreton	Liberal	William Thieme	**Josiah Francis** (Lib)	Bill Yarrow	
Oxley	Liberal	Evan Marginson	Donald Cameron* (Lib); John Martin (CP)	Edmund Crisp	
Petrie	Liberal	Samuel Martin	Alan Hulme (Lib)		James Ryan
Ryan	Liberal	Leonard Eastment	Nigel Drury (Lib)		
Wide Bay	Country	Samuel Round	**Bernard Corser** (CP)		Robert McDowell

=== South Australia ===
Electorate	Held by	Labor candidate	Liberal candidate	Other candidates
Adelaide	Labor	**Cyril Chambers**	Basil Harford	Christopher Doherty (Ind); Elsie Watt (CPA)
Angas	Liberal	Albert Strachan	Alick Downer	Ralph Whittle (Ind)
Barker	Liberal	John Klar	**Archie Cameron**	John Gartner (Ind)
Boothby	Liberal	Ralph Wells	John McLeay	
Grey	Labor	**Edgar Russell**	Edward Andrews	
Hindmarsh	Labor	Clyde Cameron	Albert Turnbull	
Kingston	Labor	**Thomas Sheehy**	Jim Handby	
Port Adelaide	Labor	**Albert Thompson**	Frederick Boscombe	Peter Symon (CPA)
Sturt	Labor	Leslie McMullin	Keith Wilson	Leonard Smith (Ind)
Wakefield	Liberal	Cyril Hasse	**Philip McBride**	

=== Tasmania ===
Electorate	Held by	Labor candidate	Liberal candidate
Bass	Labor	**Claude Barnard**	Bruce Kekwick
Darwin	Liberal	Harold Kirkpatrick	**Dame Enid Lyons**
Denison	Labor	Henry Cosgrove	Athol Townley
Franklin	Liberal	Jack Frost	**Bill Falkinder**
Wilmot	Labor	**Gil Duthie**	Rickman Furmage

=== Victoria ===
Electorate	Held by	Labor candidate	Coalition candidate	Other candidates
Balaclava	Liberal	Martin Dunne	**Thomas White** (Lib)	
Ballaarat	Labor	Raymond Hyatt	Alan Pittard (Lib)	
Batman	Labor	Alan Bird	Neil McKay (Lib)	
Bendigo	Labor	Percy Clarey	Thomas Grigg (Lib)	Allan Goodman (Ind)
Burke	Labor	Ted Peters	Alfred Wall (Lib)	Henry Hodges (Ind); James Whitworth (Ind)
Chisholm	Liberal	Leo Fennessy	Wilfrid Kent Hughes (Lib)	Bill Tregear (CPA)
Corangamite	Liberal	Henry Stacpoole	**Allan McDonald** (Lib)	Elsie Brushfield (Ind)
Corio	Labor	**John Dedman**	Hubert Opperman (Lib)	
Darebin	Labor	Tom Andrews	Jack McColl (Lib)	
Deakin	Liberal	Rod Leeson	Frank Davis (Lib)	
Fawkner	Labor	Bill Bourke	Magnus Cormack (Lib)	
Flinders	Liberal	Robert Wilson	**Rupert Ryan** (Lib)	Andrew Hughes (Ind Lab)
Gellibrand	Labor	Jack Mullens	William Massey (Lib)	William Anderson (Ind); John Arrowsmith (CPA); Angus Macdonald (Ind Lab)
Gippsland	Country	Horace Hawkins	**George Bowden** (CP)	
Henty	Liberal	Val Doube	**Jo Gullett** (Lib)	Charles Dicker (LL)
Higgins	Liberal	Jules Meltzer	**Harold Holt** (Lib)	
Higinbotham	Liberal	Frank Field	Frank Timson (Lib)	
Hoddle	Labor	Jack Cremean	Terence Kirby (Lib)	Leslie Loye (CPA); Albert Wallace (Ind)
Indi	Country	Charles Edmondson	William Bostock* (Lib); Clive Nason (CP)	
Isaacs	Liberal	John Bourke	William Haworth (Lib)	
Kooyong	Liberal	Keith Ewert	**Robert Menzies** (Lib)	
La Trobe	Liberal	Robert Balcombe	Richard Casey (Lib)	
Lalor	Labor	**Reg Pollard**	John Bellair (Lib)	
Mallee	Country	Alfred O'Connor	**Winton Turnbull** (CP)	
Maribyrnong	Labor	**Arthur Drakeford**	George Hannan (Lib)	Colin Neyland (Ind)
McMillan	Country	Adam Keltie	Geoffrey Brown* (Lib); Bob May (CP)	Bob Hamilton (CPA)
Melbourne	Labor	**Arthur Calwell**	Desmond McGinnes (Lib)	Charles McLaren (Ind); Niven Neyland (PCD); Gerry O'Day (CPA); Philip Wilson (ALPN)
Melbourne Ports	Labor	**Jack Holloway**	Frank Block (Lib)	
Murray	Country	Desmond Devlin	**John McEwen** (CP)	
Wannon	Labor	**Don McLeod**	Dan Mackinnon* (Lib); Helena Marfell (CP)	
Wills	Labor	Bill Bryson	Allan Tyrer (Lib)	**Doris Blackburn** (Ind Lab)
Wimmera	Country	Cyril Sudholz	William Lawrence* (Lib); Harrie Wade (CP)	
Yarra	Labor	Stan Keon	Charles Barrington (Lib)	John Prescott (CPA); Wenham Vines (Ind)

=== Western Australia ===
Electorate	Held by	Labor candidate	Coalition candidate	Other candidates
Canning	Country	Thomas Scaddan	William Gillespie (Lib); **Len Hamilton*** (CP)	Arthur Neville (Ind CP)
Curtin	Labor	William Lonnie	Paul Hasluck (Lib)	
Forrest	Labor	**Nelson Lemmon**	Gordon Freeth* (Lib); Arnold Potts (CP)	James Bolitho (Ind)
Fremantle	Labor	**Kim Beazley**	Billy Snedden (Lib)	Paddy Troy (CPA)
Kalgoorlie	Labor	**Herbert Johnson**	John Porteus (Lib)	
Moore	Country	Kevin Byrne	Ken Jones (Lib); Hugh Leslie* (CP)	
Perth	Labor	**Tom Burke**	Gordon Hack (Lib)	James Collins (Ind); James Kelly (CPA)
Swan	Labor	Harry Webb	Bill Grayden (Lib)	

== Senate ==
Sitting Senators are shown in bold text. The Senate was expanded at this election, with each state now allocated ten senators instead of six. Each state elected seven senators, two of whom were elected to short-term vacancies. This was also the first occasion where the Senate was elected using proportional representation. Tickets that elected at least one Senator are highlighted in the relevant colour. Successful candidates are identified by an asterisk (*).

=== New South Wales ===
Seven seats were up for election. The Labor Party was defending three seats. Four seats were newly created. Labor Senators James Arnold, Bill Ashley and William Large were not up for re-election.

Labor candidates	Coalition candidates	Communist candidates	Freedom candidates	FDP candidates	PPP candidates
1. **John Armstrong***; 2. **Donald Grant***; 3. **Stan Amour***; 4. Patrick Grace	1. Bill Spooner* (Lib); 2. Albert Reid* (CP); 3. John McCallum* (Lib); 4. John Tate* (Lib)	1. Edgar Ross; 2. Adam Ogston; 3. Joe Bailes; 4. Freda Brown	1. Alexander Huie; 2. John Owen; 3. Lionel Willis	1. George McDonald; 2. Clem Turnbull	1. Ronald Sarina; 2. Jonno Hodgson
PSJP candidates	Ungrouped candidates				
1. Peter Pollack; 2. George Jameson	Frederick Roberts; Edward Harding				

=== Queensland ===
Seven seats were up for election. The Labor Party was defending three seats. Four seats were newly created. Liberal Senators Neil O'Sullivan and Annabelle Rankin and Country Party Senator Walter Cooper were not up for re-election.

Labor candidates	Coalition candidates	Communist candidates	PPP candidates	Ungrouped candidates
1. **Ben Courtice***; 2. Archie Benn*; 3. **Gordon Brown***; 4. Austin Elliott; 5. Martin Hanson; 6. John Quinlan	1. Ted Maher* (CP); 2. Ian Wood* (Lib); 3. Roy Kendall* (Lib); 4. Wilfrid Simmonds* (Lib)	1. Max Julius; 2. Alex Macdonald; 3. Gloria Phelan; 4. Bert Field	1. James Fowler; 2. Arthur Sainsbury	James Julin

=== South Australia ===
Seven seats were up for election. The Labor Party was defending three seats. Four seats were newly created. Labor Senators Fred Beerworth, Jack Critchley and Frederick Ward were not up for re-election.

Labor candidates	Liberal candidates	Communist candidates	PPP candidates	ESWD candidates	Group D candidates
1. **Sid O'Flaherty***; 2. **Theo Nicholls***; 3. **Alex Finlay***; 4. John Ryan*	1. Ted Mattner*; 2. George McLeay*; 3. Clive Hannaford*; 4. Frank Chapman	1. Alan Finger; 2. Alf Watt; 3. John Sendy	1. Hector Mackay; 2. James McNicoll	1. Charles Johnson; 2. Lawrence McKenzie; 3. George Reval	1. Albert Smith; 2. Charles Lloyd; 3. John Williams
Ungrouped candidates					
Charles Armbruster; Edmund Craig; Frank Halleday; Frank Rieck; Mary Smith; George Edwin Yates					

=== Tasmania ===
Seven seats were up for election. The Labor Party was defending three seats. Four seats were newly created. Labor Senators Bill Morrow, Reg Murray and Justin O'Byrne were not up for re-election.

Labor candidates	Liberal candidates	Communist candidates	Ungrouped candidates
1. **Nick McKenna***; 2. **Bill Aylett***; 3. **Charles Lamp**; 4. George Cole*; 5. Howard D'Alton	1. Allan Guy*; 2. Denham Henty*; 3. Robert Wordsworth*; 4. Reg Wright*	1. George Walliss; 2. Jack Lynch	Burford Sampson

=== Victoria ===
Seven seats were up for election. The Labor Party was defending three seats. Four seats were newly created. Labor Senators Bert Hendrickson, Fred Katz and Charles Sandford were not up for re-election.

Labor candidates	Coalition candidates	Communist candidates	PPP candidates	HGL candidates	Ungrouped candidates
1. **Don Cameron***; 2. **Jack Devlin***; 3. **Jim Sheehan***; 4. Arthur Clarey	1. John Spicer* (Lib); 2. George Rankin* (CP); 3. John Gorton* (Lib); 4. Ivy Wedgwood* (Lib)	1. Ralph Gibson; 2. Ted Laurie; 3. Thelma Lees; 4. Leslie Sampson	1. Gordon Stead; 2. Mervyn Ray	1. John Atkinson; 2. Leslie Bawden; 3. Eileen Serpell	Charles Webber; John Dale; Edmund Evans; Ada Bromham

=== Western Australia ===
Seven seats were up for election. The Labor Party was defending three seats. Four seats were newly created. Labor Senators Joe Cooke, John Harris and Dorothy Tangney were not up for re-election.

Labor candidates	Coalition candidates	Communist candidates	Ungrouped candidates
1. **Richard Nash***; 2. **James Fraser***; 3. Don Willesee*; 4. **Robert Clothier**	1. Agnes Robertson* (Lib); 2. Edmund Piesse* (CP); 3. Seddon Vincent* (Lib); 4. Malcolm Scott* (Lib); 5. Hubert Malcolm (Lib)	1. Alex Jolly; 2. Kevin Healy; 3. Joan Williams	Robert Salter (IBI); William Fitzgerald (PPP); Claude Swaine (Indiv.); Mary McKinlay (Ind); Carlyle Ferguson (APA)

== Summary by party ==
Beside each party is the candidates put forward by that party in the House of Representatives for each state, as well as an indication of whether the party contested Senate elections in each state.

Party	NSW		Vic		Qld		WA		SA		Tas		ACT	NT	Total	
Party	HR	S	HR	S	HR	S	HR	S	HR	S	HR	S	HR	HR	HR	S
Australian Labor Party	46	*	33	*	18	*	8	*	10	*	5	*	1	1	122	6
Liberal Party of Australia	39	*	30	*	10	*	8	*	10	*	5	*	1		103	6
Australian Country Party	18	*	7	*	9	*	3	*							37	4
Communist Party of Australia	14	*	6	*	11	*	2	*	2	*		*			35	6
Lang Labor	8		2												10	
Republican Party	1														1	
Protestant People's Party		*		*		*		*		*						5
Freedom Party		*														1
Fair Deal Party		*														1
People's Social Justice Party		*														1
Henry George League				*												1
Independent British Israel								*								1
Individualist								*								1
All Parties Administration								*								1
Ex-Servicemen and Women and Dependents										*						1
Independent and other	17		13		7		3		4				2	2	48	

== See also ==
- 1949 Australian federal election
- Members of the Australian House of Representatives, 1946–1949
- Members of the Australian House of Representatives, 1949–1951
- Members of the Australian Senate, 1947–1950
- Members of the Australian Senate, 1950–1951
- List of political parties in Australia
