= William Kenneth Fisher =

Australian judge (1926–2010)

William Kenneth Fisher AO QC (12 April 1926 – 10 March 2010) was an Australian judge.

Fisher was born to William Charles Fisher and Phyllis Enid at Sydney. He initially attended Dubbo High School before transferring to Sydney Boys' High School in 1941, from which he graduated in 1943. He then enlisted in the Royal Australian Navy on 2 November 1944, rising to sub-lieutenant in April 1946. He enrolled at the University of Sydney in 1947, where he joined the University Labor Club and was its president from 1949 to 1950; at the 1949 federal election he ran as an independent Labor candidate against Sir Percy Spender in Warringah. He graduated with a Bachelor of Arts in 1951 and a Bachelor of Law in 1953. On 31 July 1953 he was admitted a solicitor, and he was called to the bar on 4 December. After establishing a practice on Phillip Street (he would later move to Martin Place) and developing a specialisation in industrial law, he was appointed Queen's Counsel in 1971, ran as the Labor candidate for Lowe against Prime Minister William McMahon at the 1972 federal election, and was senior counsel in the Commonwealth Royal Commission on Petroleum, which issued its reports from 1974 to 1976.

Fisher was appointed a judge of the Supreme Court of New South Wales on 30 July 1979, serving until 17 November 1981, when he was appointed President of the Industrial Commission of New South Wales. (During the period from 1992 to 1996, the Industrial Court was separated from the commission; Fisher was also Chief Judge of that body.) Serving for sixteen years until his retirement on 11 April 1998, he was the second-longest serving president in the commission's history.

He was subsequently an acting judge of the District Court between 1998 and 2002, Chair of the New South Wales Parole Board from 1999 to 2002, Commissioner of the Review of Professional Standards in the Australian Federal Police in 2003, and a partner in the industrial law firm Fisher, Cartwright and Berriman from 1998 to 2006.
