= Helena Marfell =

Australian politician

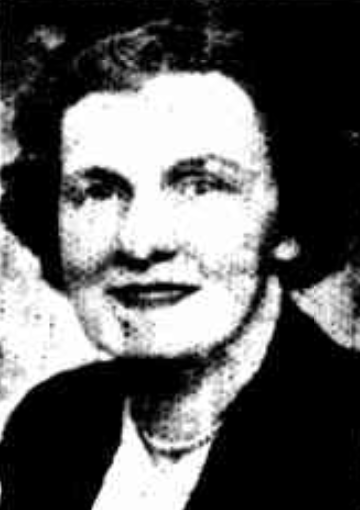
Helena Catherine Marfell OBE (1896–1981) c1949, founding member of Country Women's Association (CWA)

Helena Catherine Marfell OBE (née Glen; 4 August 1896 – 2 November 1981) was an Australian community worker who was the first president of the Country Women's Association of Australia (1945–1947).

The child of grazier Archibald Glen and his second wife Rachel, née Pratt, she attended Camperdown Church of England Grammar School and Hohenlohe College in Warrnambool. She married grain merchant Henry George Marfell on 26 December 1918 at Kariah in a Presbyterian ceremony, and as a wife and mother also worked as an accountant for her husband's business. She became deeply involved in the community, serving as senior district superintendent of the Australian Red Cross (1939–1945) and on the committee of the Warrnambool and District Base Hospital (1942–1952).

Marfell was one of the six founding members of the Country Women's Association of Victoria in 1928 and founded the Warrnambool branch in 1931. She was president of the south-west Victorian division (1938–1939, 1940–1942) and state president (1942–1945) before being elected the first president of the Country Women's Association of Australia in 1945. In 1946 she served on a committee chaired by Dorothy Tangney to advise on the legal obligation that wives take their husbands' nationality, which led to the removal of the obligation. In 1949, having stepped down as CWA president, she was elected president of the Victorian Country Party's women's section, standing as the candidate for the unwinnable seat of Wannon at that year's federal election. Her preferences helped ensure the election of Liberal candidate Dan Mackinnon. Her term as CP women's president expired in 1950 and she moved to Geelong in 1952, and was sworn in as a justice of the peace in 1953 and became a special magistrate of the Children's Court in 1957. Marfell died in 1981 at Geelong.
