= Daniel Curtin =

Daniel Curtin may refer to:

- Dan Curtin (politician) (1898–1980), Australian politician
- Dan Curtin (footballer) (born 2005), Australian rules footballer
- Daniel R. Curtin (1855–1916), American businessman, farmer, and politician
