= Ken Gee (judge) =

Australian judge and barrister

Kenneth Grenville Gee QC (17 March 1915 – 20 January 2008) was an Australian judge and barrister.

== Background ==
Gee was born in Auburn to solicitor Dion Gee and Emmeline, née Grenville. He was educated at Homebush Primary School and Fort Street Boys' High School, and then studied law at the University of Sydney, graduating with a Bachelor of Law in 1937. Becoming a solicitor, he was initially a member of the Labor Party, but his Marxism saw him expelled during Jack Lang's purges. Invited to join the Communist Party of Australia, he declined because of the Nazi–Soviet Pact and instead he joined the tiny Trotskyist Communist League. In 1941 he abandoned the law to work as an organiser for the League, led by Nick Origlass and Jack Wishart; during this period he worked as a boilermaker's labourer and was known as "Comrade Roberts". He had been friends at school with John Kerr, a future Governor-General; he had by this stage regular contacts with Laurie Short and Jim McClelland, who would go on to significant careers in ALP politics.

== Family life ==
Gee married pharmacist Isobel Russell in 1940. Their three children included the novelist Kate Grenville. He and Isobel later divorced, and Gee remarried Elaine Hearn, with whom he also had a child.

== Politics ==
Abandoning the Communist League in 1945, Gee returned to his legal practice; he was called to the Bar in 1947 and became crown prosecutor. In 1949 he rejoined the Labor Party and stood unsuccessfully in the federal election for the safe Liberal seat of Bradfield. In 1973 he was appointed Queen's Counsel and he became a judge on the District Court in 1975, serving until his retirement in 1985. He was occupied in semi-retirement as a member of the Serious Offenders Review Board and a consultant to the Judicial Commission.

In later years Gee's political views altered; he became an anti-communist, supporting the Vietnam War and the nationalists in Taiwan. His publications included a memoir, Comrade Roberts: Recollections of a Trotskyite (2006); a novel, A Maid from Heaven (1966); and a non-fiction work, The Saving of South Vietnam (1972).
