= Henry Cosgrove (judge) =

Australian judge (1922–2010)

Henry Edward Cosgrove AM QC (9 November 1922 – 22 February 2010) was an Australian judge.

Cosgrove's father, Robert Cosgrove, would serve as Premier of Tasmania from 1939 to 1947. He attended St Virgil's College from 1929 to 1939, graduating dux and with the Dr James Scott Memorial Prize for English Composition. He enrolled in a commerce degree with the Australian National University in 1940 but suspended his study in 1941 to enlist in the Australian Imperial Force, serving in New Guinea and New Britain. He graduated in May 1948, and began working as a research officer with the Bureau of Census and Statistics in 1946.

In 1952 Cosgrove enrolled in a law degree at the University of Tasmania. After distinguishing himself scholastically he graduated with First Class Honours in 1955 and was called to the Bar in 1956. He worked as a partner in the law firm Murdoch, Clarke and Neasey from 1956 and was a lecturer in criminal law from 1959. Appointed Queen's Counsel in 1974, he was raised a Judge of the Supreme Court of Tasmania in 1977. He served on the bench until his retirement in 1988. One of the famous cases Cosgrove sat on was the marathon trial of Randall Askeland who was found guilty of the murder of his wife. He was later Law Reform Commissioner (1988–91), Chairman of the Superannuation Accumulation Fund (1989–92), President of the Retirement Benefits Fund (1990–95) and Chairman of the Legal Aid Commission of Tasmania (1991). Cosgrove was appointed a Member of the Order of Australia in 1993. Cosgrove died in 2010.
