= Donald Shand =

Australian businessman

Donald Munro Shand CMG (20 September 1904 – 7 November 1976) was an Australian grazier and the founder of East-West Airlines.

Shand was born in Drummoyne in Sydney to accountant James Shand (later a member of the New South Wales Legislative Assembly) and Ann, née Donald. Shand attended Epping Public, Cleveland Street Intermediate High and Burwood Commercial schools, and studied at Sydney Technical College while employed by a wool firm. He worked on properties near Armidale before becoming a wool and skin buyer. On 24 May 1927, he married Evelyn Wigan, née Hawkins, formerly Hyde, a twice-widowed 48-year-old, at St Stephen's Presbyterian Church in Sydney. They settled near Armidale at Woodville, a 4000-acre property.

Shand converted the heavily wooded area of his property into agricultural land, selling wood to Armidale residents, and managed to survive the Great Depression by long and hard work. His reputation grew and by 1939 he was known for cultivation of soy beans, peas, chrysanthemums (for pyrethrum) and opium poppies (for morphine). He ran as one of several Country Party candidates for the House of Representatives seat of New England in 1940 and 1949, but was not successful. During World War II he organised mass production of primary products by co-operating with other landholders and using women to work the land.

In 1947, Shand became the founding chairman of East-West Airlines, which flew between Tamworth and Sydney, as well as other routes. The airline was also used for agricultural purposes, spreading superphosphate, seeding and crop dusting, for example. Trans-Australian Airlines was a related company, but Shand resisted pressure from the Commonwealth Government and Senator Shane Paltridge to accept a takeover from Ansett. Routes to Maroochydore and Alice Springs were added in the early 1970s.

Shand had been appointed to a new crops advisory body by the government during World War II, and by smuggling grains of hybrid maize from the United States he expanded on Australia's existing commercial industry. Appointed Companion of the Order of St Michael and St George in 1976, Shand was able to exploit the plummet in beef prices in the early 1970s with his new crops.

Shand's first wife died in 1951; he married another 48-year-old widow, Beryl Constance Downe, née Coventry, on 24 May 1952 at St Paul's Church in Armidale. He died at Woodville in 1976 and was cremated.
