= John Mant =

Australian solicitor (1897–1985)

John Mant OBE

Personal details
- Born: 8 February 1897 Darling Point, New South Wales
- Died: 19 November 1985 (aged 88) Vaucluse, New South Wales
- Party: Liberal Party of Australia
- Spouse: Helen Musgrave Dalziel (1931–1985)
- Children: 2
- Education: University of Sydney
- Awards: Mentioned in despatches (1919); Officer of the Order of the British Empire (1978)

Military service
- Allegiance: Commonwealth of Australia
- Branch/service: Australian Army
- Years of service: 1916–1920, 1942–1946
- Rank: Lieutenant Colonel

Lieutenant Colonel John Francis Mant OBE (8 February 1897 – 19 November 1985) was an Australian solicitor.

He was born at Darling Point to solicitor William Hall Mant and Frances Gordon, née McCrae, a granddaughter of Georgiana McCrae. His godfather was A. B. Paterson. Mant attended Sydney Grammar School and from 1914 worked in Queensland as a station hand. He enlisted in the Australian Imperial Force on 11 April 1916 and sailed for England in May, attached to the Cyclist Training Battalion. He served in France with the 3rd Divisional Cyclist Company from December 1916 and then with the 1st Infantry Battalion from January 1917. Promoted lieutenant in February 1918 and mentioned in despatches in 1919, he remained in Britain after the war to study law at the University of Edinburgh before returning to Sydney, receiving his Bachelor of Law from the University of Sydney in 1924. His appointment with the AIF was formally terminated on 23 July 1920.

On 30 October 1924, Mant was admitted as a solicitor by the New South Wales Supreme Court and began working for Ellison, Rich & Son. In 1927 he became a partner with Frank A. Davenport & Mant, which established an expertise in insurance and liquor licensing. He married widowed clerk associate Helen Musgrave Dalziel on 29 October 1931 at Darling Point. He returned to active service for World War II on 17 March 1941, first with the Citizen Military Forces and then, from 28 July 1942, as a captain in the AIF. In September 1942 he was promoted major and in October 1943 lieutenant colonel, becoming chief legal officer of the First Australian Army from 1942 to 1943 and of the Second from 1944 to 1945. On 14 February 1946 he was moved to the Reserve of Officers.

Mant was also active politically as a founding member of the Liberal Party of Australia. He was the Liberal candidate for the safe Labor seats of West Sydney in 1946 and East Sydney in 1949 and served as chair of the Vaucluse branch of the party from 1950 to 1976. He was also chairman of the Wentworth Boy Scouts' Association from 1953 to 1973 and a founder of the Australian Outward Bound Memorial Foundation. A lifelong sportsman, he had done well at rowing at school and university and was a long-standing member of the Royal Sydney Golf Club, the Palm Beach Surf Life Saving Club and the Kosciusko Alpine Club; he and his wife swam every morning into their eighties.

Mant was a delegate to Commonwealth law conferences in London in 1955 and Ottawa in 1960 and was a founder of the Australian branch of the Commercial Law Association in 1965. He retired in 1984 after sixty years of legal practice, having been appointed Officer of the Order of the British Empire in 1978. He died at Vaucluse in 1985, survived by his wife, their daughter and son, and his stepson.
