= 1949 Australian federal election =

- 10 December 1949

All 123 (Note: The Northern Territory and Australian Capital Territory each had one seat, but members for the territories did not have full voting rights until 1966 and did not count toward government formation.) seats of the House of Representatives 61 seats were needed for a majority in the House 42 (of the 60) seats of the Senate
- Opinion polls
- Registered: 4,895,227 ▲3.28%
- Turnout: 4,697,800 (95.97%) (▲2.00 pp)
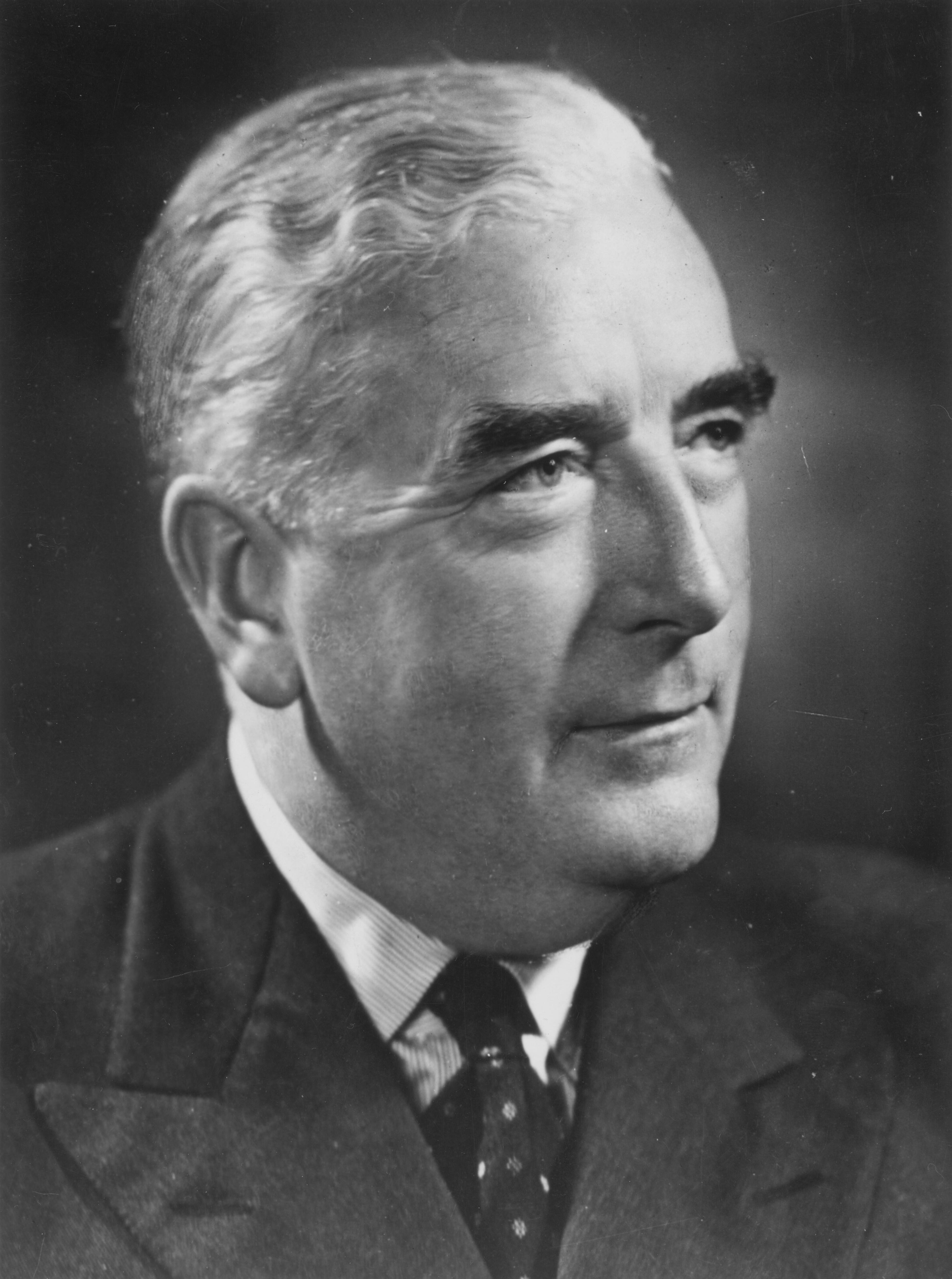

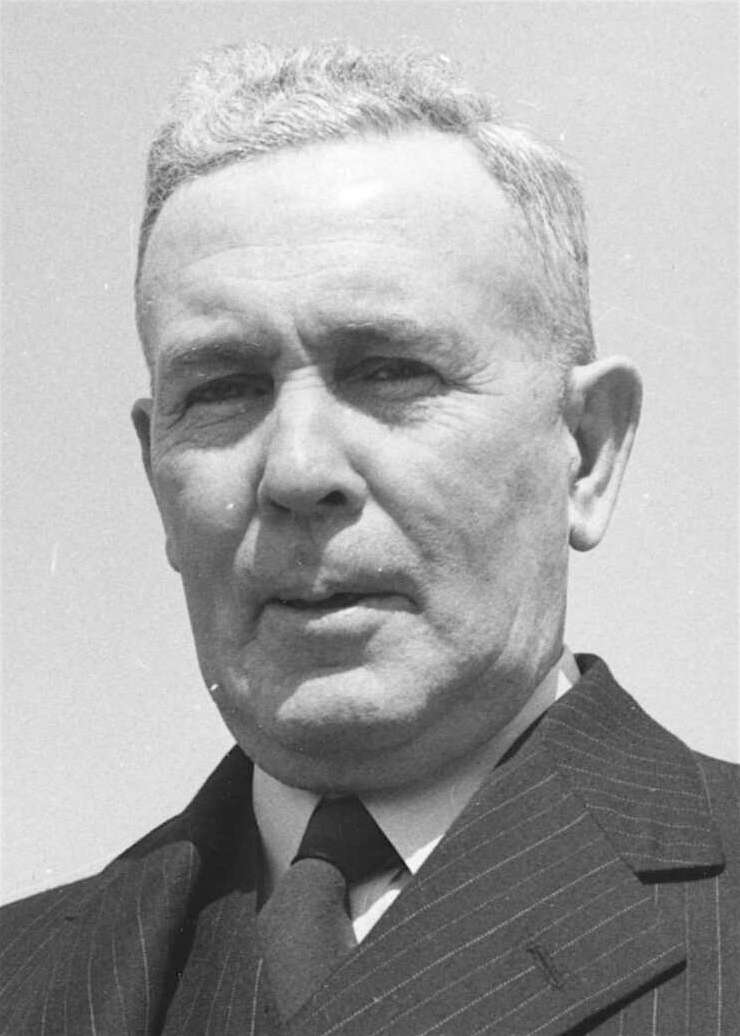
	First party	Second party
Leader	Robert Menzies	Ben Chifley
Party	Liberal–Country; Coalition	Labor
Leader since	21 February 1945	13 July 1945
Leader's seat	Kooyong (Vic.)	Macquarie (NSW)
Last election	26 seats	43 seats
Seats won	74	47 + NT
Seat change	▲48	▲4
Primary vote	2,314,143	2,117,088
Percentage	50.26%	45.98%
Swing	▲6.61	▼3.73
TPP	51.00%	49.00%
TPP swing	▲5.10	▼5.10
- Results by division for the House of Representatives, shaded by winning party's margin of victory.
Prime Minister before election
Ben Chifley
Labor
Subsequent Prime Minister
Robert Menzies
Liberal–Country Coalition

A federal election was held in Australia on 10 December 1949. All 121 seats in the House of Representatives and 42 of the 60 seats in the Senate were up for election. The incumbent Labor Party, led by Prime Minister Ben Chifley, was defeated by the opposition Liberal–Country coalition under Robert Menzies. Menzies became prime minister for a second time, his first period having ended in 1941. This election marked the end of the 8-year Curtin-Chifley Labor government that had been in power since 1941 and started the 23-year Liberal–Country Coalition government. This was the first time the Liberal party won government at the federal level.

The number of MPs in both houses had been increased at the election, and single transferable vote under a proportional voting system had been introduced for the election of the Senate. Though Labor lost government in the House of Representatives, Labor retained a Senate majority after the election, due to the use of PR and also the carry-over from the previous election. However, this majority ended at the 1951 election. With the Senate changes in place, neither Labor nor any other single party has won a Senate majority since.

Future Prime Ministers John Gorton and William McMahon both entered parliament at this election, for the Senate and the House of Representatives respectively.

== Issues ==
The election hinged on the policies of the federal Labor government, especially bank nationalisation. Prime Minister Chifley intended to bring all of the banks under Government control, a socialist policy which the Coalition argued was not in the country's interest. The Coalition promised to end unpopular wartime rationing. The election took place against the background of the 1949 Australian coal strike, the developing Cold War and growing fears of communism.

Robert Menzies broke new ground in using the radio as his primary method of reaching voters.

== Electoral reform ==
As of this election, single transferable vote with proportional representation became the method for electing the Senate. This was to try to prevent the Senate from being dominated by one party, which had often occurred previously. For example, coming into this election the ALP held 33 of the 36 Senate seats, whilst the Nationalist Party at the 1919 election held 35 of the 36 Senate seats. As well, PR was brought in to prevent mass loss of seats as the Labor Party leaders saw their chances plummet as the election approached. (After 1951, the second election after the change to STV, no party has received a majority of seats in the Senate. An established coalition did win a majority of seats in 2004.)

In addition, the House of Representatives was enlarged from 74 to 121 seats and the Senate from 36 to 60 members. All 121 lower house seats, and 42 of the 60 upper house seats, were up for election in 1949.

== Opinion polling ==
Primary vote (Note: Most of the gallup polls were adjusted to proportion the polls based around the two major party groups (Liberal–Country Coalition, Labor). Furthermore, the Country Party was not polled as an individual option but as a part of the Liberal–Country Coalition.)
View source data.

== Results ==
=== House of Representatives ===
Labor: 47 seats Liberal Party: 55 seats Country: 19 seats

House of Reps (IRV) — 1949–51—Turnout 95.97% (CV) — Informal 1.99%
Party	First preference votes	%	Swing	Seats	Change
Liberal–Country coalition	2,314,143	50.26	+6.61	74	+45
Liberal	1,813,794	39.39	+6.44	55	+37
Country	500,349	10.87	+0.17	19	+8
Labor	2,117,088	45.98	–3.73	48 (Note: Including Northern Territory)	+4
Communist	40,941	0.89	–0.60	0	0
Labor (Non-Communist)	32,870	0.71	–0.88	0	–1
Independents	99,368	2.16	+0.34	1 (Note: Including Australian Capital Territory)	–1
Total	4,604,410			123	+48
Two-party-preferred (estimated)
Liberal–Country coalition	Win	51.00	+5.10	74	+45
Labor		49.00	−5.10	47	+4

First preference vote
Labor	45.98%
Liberal	39.39%
Country	10.87%
Independent	2.16%
Communist	0.89%
Lang Labor	0.71%

Two-party-preferred vote (estimated)
Coalition	51.00%
Labor	49.00%

Parliament seats
Coalition	60.16%
Labor	39.84%

=== Senate ===
Senate (STV) — 1949–51—Turnout 95.97% (CV) — Informal 10.76%
Party	First preference votes	%	Swing	Seats won	Seats held	Change
Liberal–Country coalition	2,113,447	50.41	+7.08	23	26	+23
Liberal–Country joint ticket	1,871,849	44.65	+6.53	16	N/A	N/A
Liberal	241,598	5.76	+0.55	7	21	+19
Country	N/A	N/A	N/A	0	5	+4
Labor	1,881,956	44.89	–7.17	19	34	+1
Communist	87,958	2.10	+2.10	0	0	0
Protestant People's	37,441	0.89	–2.13	0	0	0
Independents / ungrouped	71,723	1.71	+1.03	0	0	0
Total	4,192,525			42	60	+24

== Seats changing hands ==
Seat	Pre-1949			Swing	Post-1949		
Seat	Party	Member	Margin	Swing	Margin	Member	Party
Australian Capital Territory, ACT	new division				3.8	Lewis Nott	Independent
Ballaarat, Vic	Labor	Reg Pollard	3.1	3.1	0.4	Alan Pittard	Liberal
Bass, Tas	Labor	Claude Barnard	7.0	6.8	0.6	Bruce Kekwick	Liberal
Blaxland, NSW	Lang Labor	notional - new seat	N/A	53.4	3.4	Eli Harrison	Labor
Bowman, Qld	Labor	notional - new seat	N/A	1.4	3.8	Malcolm McColm	Liberal
Corio, Vic	Labor	John Dedman	7.2	6.7	0.3	Hubert Opperman	Liberal
Curtin, WA	Labor	notional - new seat	N/A	13.8	11.2	Paul Hasluck	Liberal
Darling Downs, Qld	Country	Arthur Fadden	N/A	1.9	12.5	Reginald Swartz	Liberal
Dawson, Qld	Labor	notional - new seat	N/A	9.8	8.6	Charles Davidson	Country
Denison, Tas	Labor	Frank Gaha	7.0	10.9	5.1	Athol Townley	Liberal
Farrer, NSW	Country	notional - new seat	N/A	58.8	8.8	David Fairbairn	Liberal
Forrest, WA	Labor	Nelson Lemmon	2.3	4.4	2.8	Gordon Freeth	Liberal
Gwydir, NSW	Labor	William Scully	1.2	9.2	5.1	Thomas Treloar	Country
Hume, NSW	Labor	Arthur Fuller	4.2	5.9	1.0	Charles Anderson	Country
Indi, Vic	Country	John McEwen	N/A	59.7	9.7	William Bostock	Liberal
Kingston, SA	Labor	notional - new seat	N/A	8.4	1.6	Jim Handby	Liberal
Lawson, NSW	Labor	notional - new seat	N/A	7.6	5.8	Laurie Failes	Country
Leichhardt, Qld	Labor	notional - new seat	N/A	9.2	1.7	Tom Gilmore	Country
Lowe, NSW	Labor	notional - new seat	N/A	9.0	8.5	William McMahon	Liberal
McMillan, Vic	Country	notional - new seat	N/A	6.1	6.9	Geoffrey Brown	Liberal
McPherson, Qld	Liberal	notional - new seat	N/A	5.1	24.2	Arthur Fadden	Country
Mitchell, NSW	Labor	notional - new seat	N/A	12.8	6.9	Roy Wheeler	Liberal
Northern Territory, NT	Independent	Adair Blain	N/A	8.6	2.7	Jock Nelson	Labor
Paterson, NSW	Labor	notional - new seat	N/A	8.6	8.5	Allen Fairhall	Liberal
Riverina, NSW	Labor	Joe Langtry	0.6	3.8	3.5	Hugh Roberton	Country
Robertson, NSW	Labor	Thomas Williams	3.8	11.5	4.2	Roger Dean	Liberal
St George, NSW	Labor	notional - new seat	N/A	16.2	2.0	Bill Graham	Liberal
Sturt, SA	Labor	notional - new seat	N/A	8.9	2.8	Keith Wilson	Liberal
Swan, WA	Labor	notional	N/A	10.2	2.4	Bill Grayden	Liberal
Wannon, Vic	Labor	Don McLeod	1.2	3.8	0.8	Dan Mackinnon	Liberal
Wimmera, Vic	Country	Winton Turnbull	N/A	5.6	14.9	William Lawrence	Liberal

- Members listed in italics did not contest their seat at this election.

== Significance ==
In this election, the Chifley government was defeated, ending the, then, longest period of Labor federal government in Australian history up to that date (1941–49). Labor would not return to office until 1972. Robert Menzies became Prime Minister for the second time. (Menzies headed the United Australia party the first time he held the office.)

The 1949 election was the first time the Liberal Party of Australia won government federally, and marked the beginning of a long reign in power, stretching from 1949 until 1972.

== See also ==
- Candidates of the Australian federal election, 1949
- Members of the Australian House of Representatives, 1949–1951
- Members of the Australian Senate, 1950–1951

== Sources ==
- "Commonwealth Parliament, House of Representatives election 1949". University of Western Australia Australian Politics and Elections Database.
- University of WA election results in Australia since 1890
- Adam Carr's Election Archive - Senate 1949
- AEC 2PP vote
- Two-party-preferred vote since 1940
