= Members of the Australian Capital Territory Advisory Council =

This is a list of elected members of the Australian Capital Territory Advisory Council from its creation in 1930 until its replacement by the Australian Capital Territory House of Assembly in 1974.

== First Council, May 1930 – May 1931 ==
Name	Party	Term in office
Frederick Gell	Independent	1930–1933
Roy Rowe	Independent	1930–1931
Thomas Shakespeare	Independent	1930–1938

== Second Council, May 1931 – September 1935 ==
Name	Party	Term in office
Frederick Gell^{1}	Independent	1930–1933
John Goodwin	Independent	1931–1943
H. C. Green^{1}	Independent	1933–1935
Thomas Shakespeare	Independent	1930–1938

^{1} Frederick Gell (Independent) resigned in August 1933. H. C. Green (Independent) was appointed as his replacement in September 1933.

== Third Council, September 1935 – September 1937 ==
Name	Party	Term in office
John Goodwin	Independent	1931–1943
Lewis Nott	Independent	1935–1949, 1951
Thomas Shakespeare	Independent	1930–1938

== Fourth Council, September 1937 – September 1939 ==
Name	Party	Term in office
John Goodwin	Independent	1931–1943
John Muir^{1}	Labor	1938–1939
Lewis Nott	Independent	1935–1949, 1951
Thomas Shakespeare^{1}	Independent	1930–1938

^{1} Thomas Shakespeare (Independent) died in September 1938. John Muir (Labor) was appointed to replace him.

== Fifth Council, September 1939 – September 1941 ==
Name	Party	Term in office
Albert Gardiner	Labor	1939–1943, 1945–1947
John Goodwin	Independent	1931–1943
Lewis Nott	Independent	1935–1949, 1951

== Sixth Council, September 1941 – September 1943 ==
Name	Party	Term in office
Albert Gardiner	Labor	1939–1943, 1945–1947
John Goodwin	Independent	1931–1943
Lewis Nott	Independent	1935–1949, 1951

== Seventh Council, September 1943 – September 1945 ==
Name	Party	Term in office
John Davies	Independent	1943–1945
William Hurley	Labor	1943–1945
Lewis Nott	Independent	1935–1949, 1951

== Eighth Council, September 1945 – September 1947 ==
Name	Party	Term in office
Albert Gardiner	Labor	1939–1943, 1945–1947
Lewis Nott	Independent	1935–1949, 1951
Arthur Shakespeare	Independent	1945–1949, 1949–1955

== Ninth Council, September 1947 – September 1949 ==
Name	Party	Term in office
Ulrich Ellis	Independent	1947–1951
Lewis Nott	Independent	1935–1949, 1951
Arthur Shakespeare	Independent	1945–1949, 1949–1955

== Tenth Council, September 1949 – September 1951 ==
Name	Party	Term in office
Oliver Bourke^{2}	Labor	1951, 1952–1953
Ulrich Ellis^{3}	Independent	1947–1951
Jim Fraser^{2}	Labor	1949–1951
Lewis Nott^{1,3}	Independent	1935–1949, 1951
Arthur Shakespeare^{1}	Independent	1945–1949, 1949–1955

^{1} Lewis Nott (Independent) resigned in December 1949 to run for the House of Representatives at the federal election. Arthur Shakespeare (Independent) was appointed as his replacement.
^{2} Jim Fraser (Labor) resigned in May 1951 to run for the House of Representatives at the federal election. Oliver Bourke (Labor) was appointed as his replacement.
^{3} Ulrich Ellis (Independent) resigned in June 1951. Lewis Nott (Independent), who had been defeated by Fraser for his federal seat, was appointed as his replacement.

== Eleventh Council, September 1951 – September 1953 ==
Name	Party	Term in office
R. G. Bailey^{1}	Independent	1952–1955
Oliver Bourke^{1}	Labor	1951, 1952–1953
Frederick Quinane	Labor	1951–1959
Arthur Shakespeare	Independent	1945–1949, 1949–1955
Mary Steel Stevenson	Liberal	1951–1959

^{1} The Council was expanded in September 1952. R. G. Bailey (Independent) and Oliver Bourke (Labor) were appointed to fill the two new seats.

== Twelfth Council, September 1953 – September 1955 ==
Name	Party	Term in office
R. G. Bailey	Independent	1952–1955
William Byrne	Labor	1953–1964
Frederick Quinane	Labor	1951–1959
Arthur Shakespeare	Independent	1945–1949, 1949–1955
Mary Steel Stevenson	Liberal	1951–1959

== Thirteenth Council, September 1955 – September 1957 ==
Name	Party	Term in office
William Byrne	Labor	1953–1964
Phil Day	Liberal	1955–1959
Jim Pead	Progress	1955–1974
Frederick Quinane	Labor	1951–1959
Mary Steel Stevenson	Liberal	1951–1959

== Fourteenth Council, September 1957 – September 1959 ==
Name	Party	Term in office
William Byrne	Labor	1953–1964
Phil Day	Independent^{1}	1955–1959
William McIntyre Campbell	Independent	1957–1960
Jim Pead	Progress	1955–1974
Frederick Quinane	Labor	1951–1959
Mary Steel Stevenson	Liberal	1951–1959

^{1} Day resigned from the Liberal Party in 1957 and was re-elected as an Independent.

== Fifteenth Council, September 1959 – September 1961 ==
Name	Party	Term in office
Heinz Arndt^{2}	Labor	1959–1960, 1961–1964
Herbert Blair^{2}	Labor	1960–1963
William Byrne	Labor	1953–1964
William McIntyre Campbell^{1}	Independent	1957–1960
Anne Dalgarno	Independent	1959–1967, 1970–1974
Travis Harrison	Independent	1959–1967
Alexander Morris	Liberal	1959–1961
Jim Pead	Progress	1955–1974
Bill Pye^{1}	Independent	1960–1961, 1964–1970

^{1} William McIntyre Campbell (Independent) resigned in July 1960. Bill Pye (Independent) was appointed as his replacement.
^{2} Heinz Arndt (Labor) resigned in September 1960. Herbert Blair (Labor) was appointed as his replacement.

== Sixteenth Council, September 1961 – September 1964 ==
Name	Party	Term in office
Rose Andrew	Independent	1961–1964
Heinz Arndt	Labor	1959–1960, 1961–1964
Bert Blair^{1}	Labor	1960–1963
William Byrne	Labor	1953–1964
Anne Dalgarno	Independent	1959–1967, 1970–1974
Robert Greenish	Independent	1961–1967
Trevor Harrison	Independent	1959–1967
Jim Pead	Progress	1955–1974
Bill Spellman^{1}	Labor	1963–1964

^{1} Bert Blair (Labor) died in November 1963. Bill Spellman (Labor) was appointed as his replacement in December.

== Seventeenth Council, September 1964 – September 1967 ==
Name	Party	Term in office
Anne Dalgarno	Independent	1959–1967, 1970–1974
Robert Greenish	Independent	1961–1967
Trevor Harrison	Independent	1959–1967
George Martin	Independent	1964–1967
Jim Pead	Progress	1955–1974
Bill Pye	Independent	1960–1961, 1964–1970
Roy O'Keefe	Labor	1964–1970
Gordon Walsh	Labor	1964–1974

== Eighteenth Council, September 1967 – September 1970 ==
Name	Party	Term in office
Alan Fitzgerald	True Whig	1967–1974
Alan Harper	Liberal	1967–1970
Jim Leedman	Liberal	1967–1974
Fred McCauley^{1}	Labor	1968–1974
Roy O'Keefe	Labor	1964–1970
Jim Pead	Independent^{2}	1955–1974
Bill Pye	Independent	1960–1961, 1964–1970
Lyndall Ryan^{1}	Labor	1967–1968
Gordon Walsh	Labor	1964–1974

^{1} Lyndall Ryan (Labor) resigned in December 1968. Fred McCauley (Labor) was appointed as her replacement.
^{2} By 1967 the Australian Capital Territory Progress and Welfare Council had dissolved, and Pead thereafter stood as an Independent candidate.

== Nineteenth Council, September 1970 – September 1974 ==
Name	Party	Term in office
Ian Black	Independent	1970–1974
Anne Dalgarno	Independent	1959–1967, 1970–1974
Alan Fitzgerald	Australia Party	1967–1974
Ken Fry	Labor	1970–1974
Jim Leedman	Liberal	1967–1974
Fred McCauley	Labor	1968–1974
Jim Pead	Independent	1970–1974
Gordon Walsh	Labor	1964–1974
