= Electoral results for the Division of Australian Capital Territory =

Australian division election results

This is a list of electoral results for the Division of Australian Capital Territory in Australian federal elections from the division's creation in 1949 until its abolition in 1974.

== Members ==
Member	Party	Term
Lewis Nott	Independent	1949–1951
Jim Fraser	Labor	1951–1970
Kep Enderby	Labor	1970–1974

== Election results ==
=== Elections in the 1970s ===
==== 1972 ====
1972 Australian federal election: Australian Capital Territory
Party	Candidate	Votes	%	±%
Labor	Kep Enderby	40,147	52.1	−15.6
Liberal	Peter Hughes	17,556	22.8	−4.1
Australia	Alan Fitzgerald	10,529	13.7	+9.1
Independent	Arthur Burns	3,133	4.1	+4.1
Democratic Labor	Terence Christie	2,758	3.6	+3.6
Independent	Pat Eatock	2,003	2.6	+2.6
Independent	Michael Salvador	140	0.2	+0.2
Independent	Harry Marsh	67	0.1	+0.1
Total formal votes		77,003	98.1	
Informal votes		1,506	1.9	
Turnout		78,509	93.9	
Two-party-preferred result
Labor	Kep Enderby		65.5	−5.7
Liberal	Peter Hughes		34.5	+5.7
Labor hold		Swing	−5.7	

==== 1970 by-election ====
Australian Capital Territory by-election, 1970
Party	Candidate	Votes	%	±%
Labor	Kep Enderby	20,132	35.6	−32.1
Liberal	Clarrie Hermes	15,900	28.1	+1.2
Australia	Alan Fitzgerald	9,914	17.5	+12.9
Independent	Jim Pead	8,151	14.4	+14.4
Democratic Labor	Terence Christie	1,857	3.3	+3.3
Independent	Charles Bellchambers	438	0.8	+0.8
National Socialist	Ted Cawthron	173	0.3	+0.3
Total formal votes		56,565	96.9	
Informal votes		1,813	3.1	
Turnout		58,378	90.5	
Two-party-preferred result
Labor	Kep Enderby	32,690	57.8	−13.4
Liberal	Clarrie Hermes	23,875	42.2	+13.4
Labor hold		Swing	−13.4	

=== Elections in the 1960s ===
==== 1969 ====
1969 Australian federal election: Australian Capital Territory
Party	Candidate	Votes	%	±%
Labor	Jim Fraser	39,070	67.7	+16.0
Liberal	Robert Maher	15,492	26.9	−11.0
Australia	Thomas McDermott	2,651	4.6	+4.6
Communist	Don McHugh	477	0.8	+0.8
Total formal votes		57,690	98.2	
Informal votes		1,083	1.8	
Turnout		58,773	92.9	
Two-party-preferred result
Labor	Jim Fraser		71.2	+15.4
Liberal	Robert Maher		28.8	−15.4
Labor hold		Swing	+15.4	

==== 1966 ====
1966 Australian federal election: Australian Capital Territory
Party	Candidate	Votes	%	±%
Labor	Jim Fraser	22,721	51.6	−3.3
Liberal	Robert Rowell	16,685	36.9	−7.2
Democratic Labor	John Donohue	2,193	5.0	+5.0
Independent	Anne Dalgarno	1,458	3.3	+3.3
Independent	Robert Greenish	938	2.1	+2.1
Total formal votes		43,995	98.3	
Informal votes		777	1.7	
Turnout		44,772	93.0	
Two-party-preferred result
Labor	Jim Fraser		55.8	+0.9
Liberal	Robert Rowell		44.2	−0.9
Labor hold		Swing	+0.9	

==== 1963 ====
1963 Australian federal election: Australian Capital Territory
Party	Candidate	Votes	%	±%
Labor	Jim Fraser	17,984	54.9	−10.0
Liberal	Elizabeth Calvert	14,748	45.1	+10.0
Total formal votes		32,732	97.9	
Informal votes		701	2.1	
Turnout		33,433	92.8	
Labor hold		Swing	−10.0	

==== 1961 ====
1961 Australian federal election: Australian Capital Territory
Party	Candidate	Votes	%	±%
Labor	Jim Fraser	17,114	64.9	+1.5
Liberal	Geoffrey Small	9,263	35.1	+11.9
Total formal votes		26,377	98.7	
Informal votes		351	1.3	
Turnout		26,728	93.2	
Labor hold		Swing	−1.9	

=== Elections in the 1950s ===
==== 1958 ====
1958 Australian federal election: Australian Capital Territory
Party	Candidate	Votes	%	±%
Labor	Jim Fraser	11,980	63.4	−1.2
Liberal	Anne Dalgarno	4,383	23.2	−12.2
Independent	Phil Day	2,534	13.4	+13.4
Total formal votes		18,897	98.7	
Informal votes		251	1.3	
Turnout		19,148	93.2	
Two-party-preferred result
Labor	Jim Fraser		66.8	+2.2
Liberal	Anne Dalgarno		23.2	−2.2
Labor hold		Swing	+2.2	

==== 1955 ====
1955 Australian federal election: Australian Capital Territory
Party	Candidate	Votes	%	±%
Labor	Jim Fraser	9,588	64.6	+1.9
Liberal	Robert Greenish	5,263	35.4	+1.0
Total formal votes		14,851	99.2	
Informal votes		126	0.8	
Turnout		14,977	92.6	
Labor hold		Swing	−0.3	

==== 1954 ====
1954 Australian federal election: Australian Capital Territory
Party	Candidate	Votes	%	±%
Labor	Jim Fraser	8,762	62.7	+12.8
Liberal	Mary Steel Stevenson	4,799	34.4	+15.1
Independent	John Cusack	405	2.9	+2.9
Total formal votes		13,966	99.2	
Informal votes		108	0.8	
Turnout		14,074	94.3	
Two-party-preferred result
Labor	Jim Fraser		64.9	+14.1
Liberal	Mary Steel Stevenson		35.1	+35.1
Labor hold		Swing	+14.1	

==== 1951 ====
1951 Australian federal election: Australian Capital Territory
Party	Candidate	Votes	%	±%
Labor	Jim Fraser	5,905	49.9	+6.7
Independent	Lewis Nott	3,265	27.6	−3.5
Liberal	Clyde Greenwood	2,287	19.3	−3.2
Independent	Jessie Ashton	373	3.2	−0.1
Total formal votes		11,830	99.4	
Informal votes		69	0.6	
Turnout		11,899	93.2	
Two-party-preferred result
Labor	Jim Fraser		52.9	+6.7
Independent	Lewis Nott		47.1	−6.7
Labor gain from Independent		Swing	+6.7	

=== Elections in the 1940s ===
==== 1949 ====
1949 Australian federal election: Australian Capital Territory
Party	Candidate	Votes	%	±%
Labor	Sidney Rhodes	4,823	43.2	+43.2
Independent	Lewis Nott	3,475	31.1	+31.1
Liberal	Malcolm Moir	2,510	22.5	+22.5
Independent	Jessie Ashton	366	3.3	+3.3
Total formal votes		11,174	99.4	
Informal votes		68	0.6	
Turnout		11,242	94.9	
Two-party-preferred result
Independent	Lewis Nott	6,013	53.8	+53.8
Labor	Sidney Rhodes	5,161	46.2	+46.2
Independent win		(new seat)		
