= 1967 Australian Capital Territory election =

- 16 September 1964

All 8 seats on the Australian Capital Territory Advisory Council 5 seats needed for a majority

	First party	Second party	Third party
			TWP
Leader	No leader	Jim Leedman	Alan Fitzgerald
Party	Labor	Liberal	True Whig
Last election	2	0	Did not exist
Seats won	3	2	1
Seat change	▲1	▲2	▲1
Largest party before election
Independents
Largest party after election
Labor

The 1967 Australian Capital Territory election was held on Saturday 16 September 1967 to elect all eight members of the Advisory Council, the main elected representative body of the Australian Capital Territory (ACT).

The election was contested by the True Whig Party, a joke party formed by satirist Alan Fitzgerald in 1966. Although standing on a joke platform and promising to "do nothing", Fitzgerald was elected with the third highest primary vote behind Labor and the Liberal Party.

Prior to the election, the ACT Progress and Welfare Council had dissolved, and incumbent member Jim Pead stood as an independent candidate.

== Results ==
The Liberal Party returned to having representation on the council, having not won any seats in 1964.

Legislative Assembly (STV/PR)
Party	Votes	%	Swing	Seats	Change
Labor				3	▲1
Liberal				2	▲2
True Whig				1	▲1
Independents				2	▼3
Total		100.0			
