= Members of the Australian Parliament who represented more than one state or territory =

This is a list of Members of the Parliament of Australia who represented more than one state or territory during their federal parliamentary career.

Most people in the list represented different states or territories in the House of Representatives. Nobody has ever represented different states or territories in the Senate, although various attempts have been made. Only one person, Barnaby Joyce, has ever represented one state in the Senate and a different state in the House of Representatives.

The first person to represent a second state was Billy Hughes. He had represented New South Wales since 1901, and was elected to a Victorian seat on 5 May 1917. On 16 December 1922 he was again elected to a NSW seat, the only person to return to his original state. Hughes is also the only person in this list whose parliamentary service was continuous.

The only person who represented both a state and a territory was Lewis Nott (Queensland 1925–28; Australian Capital Territory 1949–51).

All states and territories except South Australia and the Northern Territory are represented in the list.

Name	State/ Territory	House	Electorate	From	To	Reason	Comments
Billy Hughes	NSW	H of R	West Sydney	29 March 1901	4 May 1917	Transferred seat	The first person to represent a second state (5 May 1917). The only person to return to his original state (16 December 1922).
Billy Hughes	VIC	H of R	Bendigo	5 May 1917	15 December 1922	Transferred seat	The first person to represent a second state (5 May 1917). The only person to return to his original state (16 December 1922).
Billy Hughes	NSW	H of R	North Sydney	16 December 1922	9 December 1949	Transferred seat	The first person to represent a second state (5 May 1917). The only person to return to his original state (16 December 1922).
Billy Hughes	NSW	H of R	Bradfield	10 December 1949	28 October 1952	Died	The first person to represent a second state (5 May 1917). The only person to return to his original state (16 December 1922).
Barnaby Joyce	QLD	Senate	Queensland	1 July 2005	8 August 2013	Resigned	The only person to have represented one state in the Senate and a different state in the House of Representatives; The seat of New England borders the state of Queensland
Barnaby Joyce	NSW	H of R	New England	7 September 2013	27 October 2017	Ruled ineligible to have been a candidate due to dual citizenship	The only person to have represented one state in the Senate and a different state in the House of Representatives; The seat of New England borders the state of Queensland
Barnaby Joyce	NSW	H of R	New England	2 December 2017	incumbent		The only person to have represented one state in the Senate and a different state in the House of Representatives; The seat of New England borders the state of Queensland
Nelson Lemmon	WA	H of R	Forrest	21 August 1943	10 December 1949	Defeated	
Nelson Lemmon	NSW	H of R	St George	29 May 1954	10 December 1955	Defeated	
Parker Moloney	VIC	H of R	Indi	13 April 1910	31 May 1913	Defeated	The seats of Indi and Hume bordered each other at the time
Parker Moloney	VIC	H of R	Indi	5 September 1914	5 May 1917	Defeated	The seats of Indi and Hume bordered each other at the time
Parker Moloney	NSW	H of R	Hume	13 December 1919	19 December 1931	Defeated	The seats of Indi and Hume bordered each other at the time
Lewis Nott	QLD	H of R	Herbert	14 November 1925	17 November 1928	Defeated	The only person who represented both a state and a territory (10 December 1949).
Lewis Nott	ACT	H of R	Australian Capital Territory	10 December 1949	28 April 1951	Defeated	The only person who represented both a state and a territory (10 December 1949).
William Spence	NSW	H of R	Darling	29 March 1901	5 May 1917	Defeated	In 1919 he ran unsuccessfully for a Victorian seat, which would have been his third state had he won.
William Spence	TAS	H of R	Darwin	30 June 1917 (by-election)	13 December 1919	Defeated	In 1919 he ran unsuccessfully for a Victorian seat, which would have been his third state had he won.

== Sources ==
- Members of the House of Representatives since 1901
