= John Thomas Hill Goodwin =

John Goodwin MBE
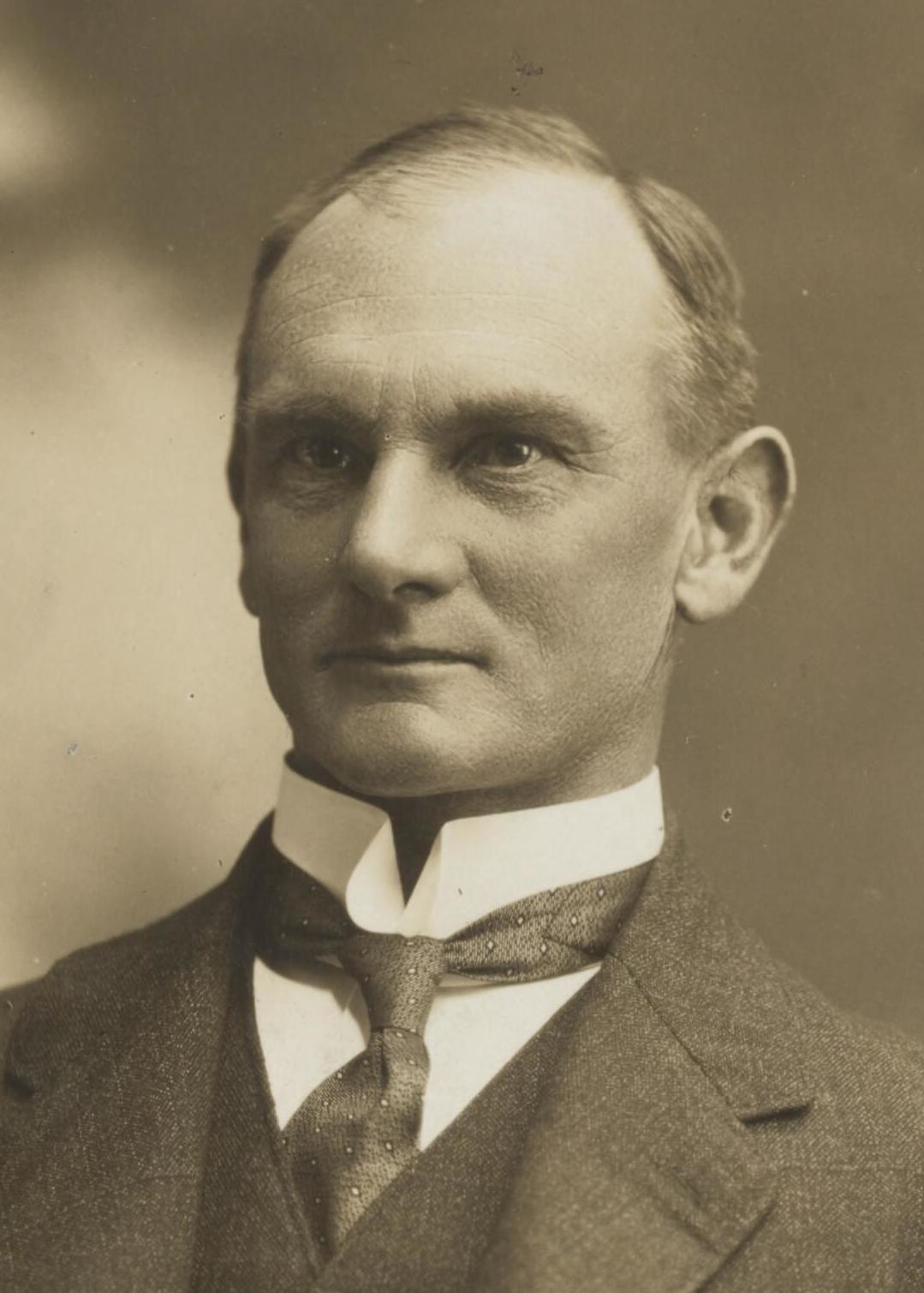
- Born: 28 October 1865; Yelta, Victoria, Australia
- Died: 18 September 1950 (aged 84); Canberra, Australia
- Education: Melbourne Grammar School
- Spouse: Harriet Turton (m. 1893; died 1933)

John Thomas Hill Goodwin MBE (28 October 1865 – 18 September 1950) was an Australian surveyor and public servant. He was the Commonwealth Surveyor-General from 1915 to 1925 and officer-in-charge of the Federal Capital Territory from 1916 to 1924. He was known for his contribution to the development of the national capital Canberra, initially as a public servant and later as a private citizen.

== Early life ==
Goodwin was born on 28 October 1865 in Yelta, Victoria. He was the son of Letitia (née Pennefather) and Rev. Thomas Hill Goodwin. His father, an Anglican clergyman, was born in England and his mother in Ireland. He was educated at Melbourne Grammar School.

== Career ==
After leaving school Goodwin trained as a surveyor with the Victorian Department of Lands and Surveys. He was a surveyor in private practice from 1891 to 1907, outside of a period with the Western Australian government from 1896 to 1899. He also qualified as a civil engineer. Goodwin returned to the Victorian public service in 1907 and joined the federal Department of Home Affairs in 1910. He was placed in charge of property transactions relating to defence, quarantine, and posts and telegraphs. In 1915, he was promoted to Chief Surveyor, later Surveyor-General.

=== Military service ===
Goodwin held a commission in the Victorian Military Forces from 1891. In 1910 he was appointed as a lieutenant in the Corps of Australian Engineers within the Militia. He volunteered for overseas service during World War I but was retained in Australia. He retired from the reserve in 1920 with the rank of honorary lieutenant-colonel, and was often known as "Colonel Goodwin".

=== Canberra ===
In addition to his role as Chief Surveyor, Goodwin served as officer-in-charge of the Federal Capital Territory (FCT) from 1916 to 1924. He was a member of the Federal Capital Advisory Committee from 1921 to 1925. Goodwin lived at Yarralumla, the future Government House, during this period. In 1924 he organised the first sale of properties in Canberra to the public.

Goodwin chose to remain in Canberra after retiring from the public service and became active in community affairs, in addition to resuming his surveying practice. He was a local magistrate and also served as the territory's coroner. He notably conducted a coronial inquest into the 1940 Canberra air disaster, which killed ten people including three cabinet members and a senior army officer. Goodwin was an elected member of the Federal Capital Territory Advisory Council from 1931 to 1943, including as chairman from 1936 to 1941. He was also a board member of the Canberra Community Hospital from 1938 to 1948 and a member of the National Capital Planning and Development Committee from 1939 to 1941. He advocated for the territory to be self-governing with its own legislative council, as well as for its representative in the House of Representatives to be granted full voting rights.

== Personal life ==
Goodwin married Harriet Turton in 1893, with whom he had three sons. He was widowed in 1933. His son Shirley Thomas William Goodwin was a career army officer who served in both world wars. He reached the rank of temporary brigadier and was killed in action in New Guinea in 1943.

Goodwin died at the Canberra Community Hospital on 18 September 1950 of cerebral thrombosis. He had been in poor health for 18 months and a patient at the hospital for 11 months. He was buried in the graveyard of St John the Baptist Church, Reid.

=== Honours ===
Goodwin was appointed Member of the Order of the British Empire (MBE) in 1927. In 1954, his name was used for Canberra's first aged care facility.
