= True Whig Party (Australia) =

Australian joke party by Alan Fitzgerald

- Leader: Alan Fitzgerald
- Founder: Alan Fitzgerald
- Founded: 1966
- Dissolved: 1970
- Succeeded by: Australia Party
- Slogan: "Do nothing"
- ACT Advisory Council: 1 / 9 (1967–1970)

The True Whig Party was an Australian joke party, formed by satirist Alan Fitzgerald.

== History ==
In 1966, frustrated with the lack of power that the Australian Capital Territory Advisory Council had, Alan Fitzgerald announced he was forming the True Whig Party. He called on voters to write his or his party's names on ballot papers for the Division of Australian Capital Territory at the 1966 federal election.

Hearing that many voters had done so, Fitzgerald announced on 14 August 1967 that he would stand for the Advisory Council at the upcoming election in September. The party's platform was "to do nothing", parodying the model of local politicians. Fitzgerald refused to make a campaign speech, later describing his silence as "meaningful". One of the party's campaign promises was to build service stations on Mugga Way in the suburb of Red Hill.

Fitzgerald was subsequently elected, receiving the third highest primary vote behind Labor and the Liberal Party. Although elected on a joke platform, he carried out his duties on the Advisory Council in a serious fashion.

In May 1970, he joined the Australia Party and contested the federal ACT by-election. The True Whig Party was disbanded around this time and Fitzgerald contested the 1970 Advisory Council election for the Australia Party, being re-elected with 21% of the vote (ahead of the Liberal Party).
