= Clarrie Hermes =

Australian barrister and magistrate

Clarence Lindsay Hermes AM (16 January 1921 – 24 January 1991) was an Australian barrister and magistrate.

He was born at Arncliffe in Sydney to schoolteacher Alphonse Réné Hermès and Daphne Browne. From 1928 he lived in South Australia with his family, and in 1936 graduated from Birdwood High School in Adelaide. He was unable to afford university and so worked for the Adelaide Advertiser as a copy boy and then as a clerk at the Union Bank of Australia. He served in the Royal Australian Air Force during World War II as a radio and intelligence officer. Following his return, under the Commonwealth Reconstruction Training Scheme, he studied law at the University of Adelaide.

In 1950 he was called to the Bar and joined a firm in Whyalla. On 9 May 1953 he married nurse Betty Ellen Lewthwaite. In 1953 he was recruited by the Australian Secret Intelligence Service and was sent to train with MI6. In 1957 he was expecting an appointment in Indonesia, but the dismissal of Alfred Deakin Brookes put his future in question and he resigned to work for the Crown Solicitor's Office. In 1961 he was appointed to the Adelaide Police Court as a magistrate, and in 1963 moved to Canberra as an additional stipendiary magistrate on the Court of Petty Sessions. He developed a keen interest in the rehabilitation of young offenders. He was given the Canberra Citizen of the Year award in 1968.

In 1969 he received a Winston Churchill Memorial Trusts Fellowship and visited Europe and the United States studying legal practices surrounding young offenders. In 1970 he was persuaded by the Liberal Party to stand for a by-election for the House of Representatives seat of Australian Capital Territory, but he was defeated by Kep Enderby of the Labor Party. He then became London representative of the Attorney-General's Department, and in 1980 was appointed Chief Magistrate for the Australian Capital Territory.

Hermes retired from the bench in 1984, but later served as chair of the ACT Credit Tribunal and as a government consultant. He died in 1991 in Canberra Hospital after a heart attack. Clarrie Hermes Drive in Gungahlin and Clarrie Hermes Park in Hughes, where Hermes lived, are named in his honour.
