= Australian Capital Territory Progress and Welfare Council =

ACT Progress and Welfare Council
- Founded: 1969
- Dissolved: c. 1967
- ACT Advisory Council: 1 / 8 (1955–1965)

The Australian Capital Territory Progress and Welfare Council (known as the ACT Progress and Welfare Council) was a peak co-ordination body of progress associations in the Australian Capital Territory. It also operated as a political party in the ACT in the period prior to self-government in 1989.

== Background ==
The Federal Capital Territory (renamed the Australian Capital Territory in 1938) was created in 1911 by the Seat of Government (Administration) Act 1910 out of the state of New South Wales. Residents in the FCT were disenfranchised as they were no longer entitled to vote in NSW, but there was no elected body in the FCT. This led to the creation of the Federal Territory Vigilance Association to seek to protect the interests of residents of the FCT. Development was slow, as were steps towards political representation. In 1927 a FCT Representation League was formed. A partially elected Advisory Council was established in 1930.

== Progress Associations and the Council ==
A feature of Canberra life as the city slowly developed was the establishment of progress associations in many of the emerging suburbs, to lobby for increased civic amenities. A number of progress associations were established in 1922: Eastlake (a temporary suburb which later became Kingston), Westridge (which later became Yarralumla) and Molonglo Settlement (which later became part of Fyshwick). The next progress associations to be established were those at the temporary suburbs of Westlake (later Stirling Park in Yarralumla) and Causeway (later also part of Kingston), established in 1924. The oldest existing Inner Canberra association is the Reid Progress Association, dating from 1930, since renamed the Reid Residents' Association, although the Hall Village Progress Association was already in existence by at least 1929.

In 1944 the Associations were brought together with the establishment of the council as a representative body. The initial focus for the council was bus routes, milk supply, swimming facilities in North Canberra, specialist medical visits to Canberra Hospital and play centres. The council was slow to establish itself: in 1950 the Narrabundah-Griffith Progress Association described the council as 'moribund'. By 1955 there were only 4 active progress associations remaining: Yarralumla, Duntroon, Turner and O'Connor.

== Presidents ==
- L White, 1944.
- Cyril Patrick Hiland, 1944-?.
- J H Burns, 1946–47.
- Ulrich Ellis, 1947-?.
- W Wilmhurst, ?-1950.
- Joseph H Riddle, 1951–52.
- Kevin J Mulherin, 1953-late 1960s.

== ACT Advisory Council ==
An early President of the council, the journalist and political activist Ulrich Ellis, had been a member of the ACT Advisory Council from 1947 to 1951, but as an independent rather than as a representative of the council. The council's principle was of 'no party politics in civic affairs'. The Council first ran a candidate for the Advisory Council election in 1951 (W C Cottingham), but without success.

Kevin Mulherin and Jim Pead were Progress and Welfare Council candidates for the Advisory Council election in 1953, but were unsuccessful. They both stood again in 1955 and Pead was elected, and re-elected in 1957, 1959, 1961, and 1964. Pead's election in 1955 was despite only being second on the council's ticket (after the president, Mulherin). No other Council candidates were ever elected. In 1957 Pead asserted that the council would be successful in getting at least two candidates, if not three, elected. At the time there were only six elected positions. As usual, however, only Pead was elected.

The Council still existed in 1965, but by the time of the 1967 Advisory Council election Pead, who was re-elected, was an independent candidate and the Council appears to have been dissolved. Pead was again re-elected in 1970 as an independent. Pead was also a candidate in the 1970 Australian Capital Territory by-election, also as an independent (although his election agent was Kevin Mulherin). Pead was elected to the Advisory Council's replacement, the Legislative Assembly, in 1975, again as an independent.

Council members were elected to other bodies. In 1964, the council's FH Brown was elected Chairman of the ACT Road Safety Council.

== Legacy ==
By the 1980s the remaining Progress Associations had morphed into Residents' Associations. In 1987 the Residents' Associations, together with anti-casino groups and the Conservation Council of the ACT, came together and formed the Residents Rally. The Rally was successful in getting four MPs elected to the first self-government Legislative Assembly at the 1989 election; from later that year until 1991 the Rally formed a coalition government with the Liberal Party. Its support collapsed at the 1992 election, and no Rally candidates were elected, although a former Rally MP, Michael Moore, was elected as an independent.
