= Frederick James McCauley =

Australian trade unionist

Frederick James McCauley (1905-1995) was an Australian trade unionist from the Canberra (Australian Capital Territory) and Queanbeyan (New South Wales) region.

== Early life ==
Born in the Irishtown precinct of Queanbeyan on 30 August 1905, McCauley started his working life as a bricklayer. He served his apprenticeship on Australia's original Parliament House and subsequently worked on buildings in the Canberra and Queanbeyan area, including St Christopher's Church (now a Cathedral), St Paul's Church and the Embassy of the United States of America.

== Union career ==
Prior to World War II, McCauley established the Canberra/ACT Bricklayers Union, taking on the role of Secretary. The union eventually merged with the Amalgamated Society of Carpenters and Joiners to form the ACT branch of the Building Workers Industrial Union (BWIU), with McCauley elected as secretary. He served the BWIU until retirement in 1983.

McCauley also held several roles within the Federal office of the BWIU, including Senior Vice President (Deputy President) and acting President (1958 - 1967). McCauley was selected by the BWIU to lead and attend international delegations, including one in 1964 to the then Soviet Union.

From 1950 to 1960, McCauley also held several senior roles in the ACT Trades and Labour Council.

As a unionist, McCauley is credited with achieving numerous wins for ACT bricklayers and building employees, including:

- replacing hourly hire provisions with weekly hire provisions and reducing the working week from 44 hours to 40 hours per week
- paid sick leave, paid public holidays, full wet weather pay, compassionate leave and annual leave
- improvements to awards for increases in annual leave
- the right for apprentices to have paid time for classroom training and
- achieving an amendment to the award of the day so that employers could not sack employees before Christmas and re-employ them after in order to evade holiday pay.

At the time, these conditions were considered above-average conditions and were acknowledged as a reason for the lack of disputes within the ACT.

McCauley also identified the need for a dedicated trade union building and a community and social club for workers and their families, in an era when women and children did not generally go to pubs. He single-handedly raised funds and arranged for the Federal office of the BWIU guarantee a loan to develop and build the Tradesmen's Union Club in Dickson. The club opened in 1964, with McCauley as president; he remained on the board for 20 years. In 1969, following lobbying from the BWIU, McCauley established the Tradesman's Club in Phillip, ACT and remained the Secretary/Manager of the club until 1983. The Phillip club closed in 2018, however, the Dickson club continues to operate and support the community as "The Tradies".

== Other contributions ==
From 1969 to 1974, McCauley was a member of the ACT Advisory Council (the precursor to the ACT Legislative Assembly), as a representative of the Australian Labor Party. He then served as an independent member of the ACT Legislative Assembly from 1974 to 1978.

Other key roles that McCauley held include:

- secretary of the Queanbeyan Bluebells Football Club (later to become the Queanbeyan Blues Rugby League club) in the 1920s
- Queanbeyan Alderman from 1956 to 1962
- member of Queanbeyan Hospital Board for 25 years (including the last 10 years as chairman)
- a member of the National Capital Development Commission Planning Committee
- member and chairman of the ACT Apprenticeship Board for 33 years
- a member and president of the ACT trades advisory committee
- a member of the ABC Canberra Advisory Committee

McCauley was a long-standing Justice of the Peace. At the time of his initial appointment in Queanbeyan in 1927 he was 21 - the youngest in the British Empire. He also served as a Justice of the Peace in the ACT from 1964 to 1992.

McCauley was an advocate for the Jennings Germans - a group of around 150 single males who came to Canberra from Germany in the early 1950s to work for AVJennings and became "the backbone of the young building industry".

== Awards ==
In 1972, McCauley was awarded an MBE for his services to industrial relations and government. McCauley was also recognised by The Canberra Times on several occasions, including a nomination in 1978 for “Canberran of the Year” and again in 2001 as one of the 75 faces that helped shaped Canberra. The ACT Building and Construction Industry Training Fund Authority continues to issue the F J McCauley Award – "a perpetual trophy awarded to the ACT Australian Apprentice of the Year … established as a tribute to Fred McCauley’s long standing commitment to the trades and trade training in the ACT".

== Personal life ==
In 1929, McCauley married Leila Annie McGregor in Cooma, NSW. He died on 11 December 1995.
