= Anne Dalgarno =

Anne Patricia Dalgarno MBE (6 July 1909 – 6 May 1980) was an Australian politician, nurse and community leader.

Dalgarno was born Anne Patricia Smith in Wrentham, Suffolk, to farmer Henry Patrick Smith and Mabel Christina, née Edwards. Cardinal Patrick Moran was her uncle. She had governesses before attending the Convent of the Holy Family in Littlehampton, Sussex, and migrated to Western Australia with her family when she was sixteen. Smith trained at the Children's and Perth hospitals and became a registered nurse in 1933. She married Kenneth John Dalgarno, a civil engineer, on 1 July 1937 at St Mary's Cathedral in Sydney. They had two children before moving to Canberra in 1948.

Dalgarno established the Nurses Club in 1954 and was a board member of Canberra Community Hospital (1954–59) and president of the ACT branch of the Royal Australian Nursing Federation. She unsuccessfully ran for the division of Australian Capital Territory as a Liberal in 1958 and an independent in 1966. She was elected as an independent to the Australian Capital Territory Advisory Council in 1959 and served until 1967, and again from 1970 until 1974. She was the only woman on the council (Mary Steel Stevenson having been a member until 1959 and Lyndall Ryan being a member from 1967 to 1968 when Dalgarno was not on the council) and encouraged women to become involved in politics.

Dalgarno was an opponent of self-government, supporting a lord mayor as opposed to a chief minister. She presided over the Foundation for Youth Ltd from 1972 and established the Emergency Housing Committee in 1973. Dalgarno, a proponent of Christian values and vigorous opponent of abortion, was appointed a Member of the Order of the British Empire in 1977. She died at Royal Canberra Hospital in 1980 of chronic asthma and was buried in Canberra Cemetery.

Dalgarno Close in the Canberra suburb of Macquarie is named in her honour.

== Achievements ==
- Member of Board of the Canberra Community Hospital
