= Ulrich Ellis =

Australian journalist

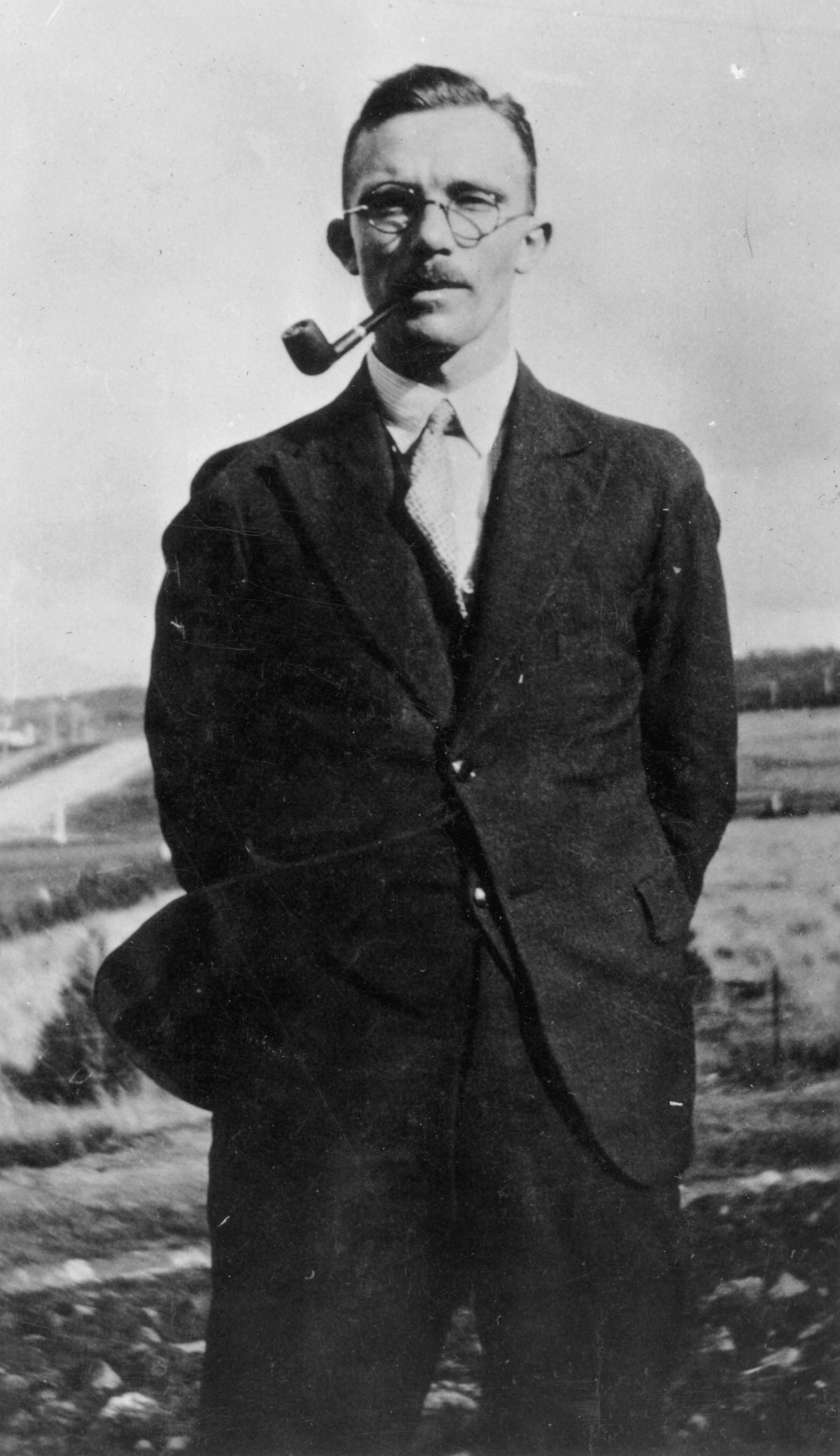
Ulrich Ruegg Ellis

Ulrich Ruegg Ellis (23 July 1904 – 4 December 1981) was an Australian journalist, political activist, and historian. He was known for his work in developing Canberra, his involvement with the new state movement, and his behind-the-scenes work with the Country Party. He was the younger brother of the writer Malcolm Henry Ellis.

== Early life ==
Ellis was born in Mount Morgan, Queensland, the youngest child of Constance Jane (née Ruegg) and Thomas James Ellis. His father was an Irish-born miner and his mother was born in England. He was raised solely by his mother from the age of three, when she and the children moved to the Brisbane suburb of Tingalpa. Ellis attended the local state school in Kelvin Grove before going on to Brisbane Grammar School. He became a cadet journalist at the age of 16.

== Journalism and life in Canberra ==
From 1921 to 1922, Ellis worked in Melbourne as a member of a news agency serving regional newspapers. He later worked for metropolitan daily newspapers, and then in 1925 began writing for the Morning Post, the newspaper of the Victorian Country Party. Ellis moved to Canberra in 1927 as one of the first permanent press correspondents; he was one of the forerunners of the Canberra Press Gallery. He married Ray Arnot Maxwell, the daughter of federal MP George Maxwell, on 19 December 1930. Ellis was a "passionate advocate of local self-government" for Canberra and an advocate for the improvement of the capital's amenities, which were those of a small country town. He was the inaugural chairman of the Canberra Tourist Bureau from 1937 to 1940, and served on the Australian Capital Territory Advisory Council, an elective office, from 1947 to 1951.

In 1936, Ellis began working for the Department of Commerce as a commercial intelligence officer. He moved to Melbourne in 1940 and joined the Department of Munitions in an administrative capacity overseeing 600 employees. In 1944, Ellis moved back to Canberra and joined the Department of Post-War Reconstruction as deputy director of public relations. He wrote a letter to The Canberra Times in April 1945 criticising Interior Minister Joe Collings, accusing him of "laugh[ing] with contempt in the face of the common principles of administrative justice" and calling him "unfit to administer his Department". He was subsequently charged under the Public Service Act and fined £2 for contravening regulations. Ellis's final public-service position was in the Department of Information from 1946 to 1947. He subsequently established a rural lobby group, the Office of Rural Research.

== Politics ==
In 1928, Ellis was appointed private secretary to Earle Page, the leader of the Country Party. They became close friends, and Ellis shared Page's passion for the New State Movement, which advocated for the creation of new states in regional New South Wales and Queensland. In 1933, Ellis served as the publicity officer for Charles Hardy's Riverina Movement, which advocated the secession of the Riverina from the rest of New South Wales. The following year, he gave evidence before the New South Wales royal commission on new states, chaired by Judge Harold Sprent Nicholas. Ellis served on the executive of the New England New State Movement from 1948, and he and his wife moved to Armidale, New South Wales, in 1960. He campaigned for the "Yes" vote in the 1967 New England secession referendum, which failed.

In the late 1940s Ellis was an early President of the Australian Capital Territory Progress and Welfare Council, which was a representative body for Progress Associations in the ACT. Ellis was a member of the ACT Advisory Council from 1947 to 1951, but as an independent rather than as a representative of the council, which subsequently ran candidates for Advisory Council elections.

During the 1950s, Ellis served as "publicist, valet, chauffeur, nursemaid and baggage handler" to Arthur Fadden, the leader of the Country Party and Deputy Prime Minister. He published two histories of the Country Party: The Country Party: A Political and Social History of the Party in New South Wales (1958), and A History of the Australian Country Party (1963).
