= Gus's =

Cafe in Canberra, Australia

Coordinates: 35°16′39.92″S 149°7′55.00″E

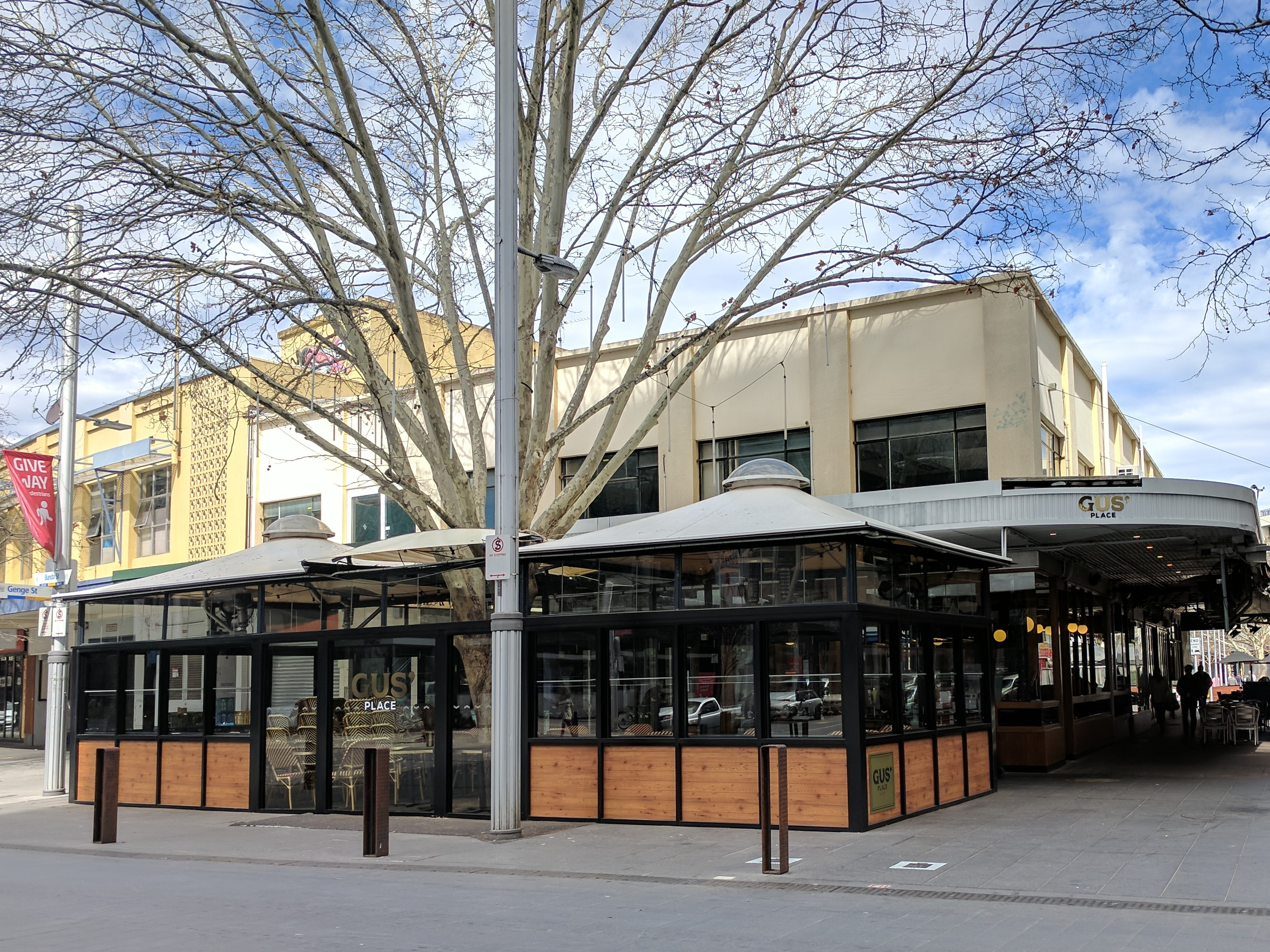
- Gus' Place in September 2017
- Interactive map of Gus's

Restaurant information
- Established: 1969
- Closed: January 14, 2024
- Previous owner: Augustin 'Gus'
- Location: Canberra, Australia.

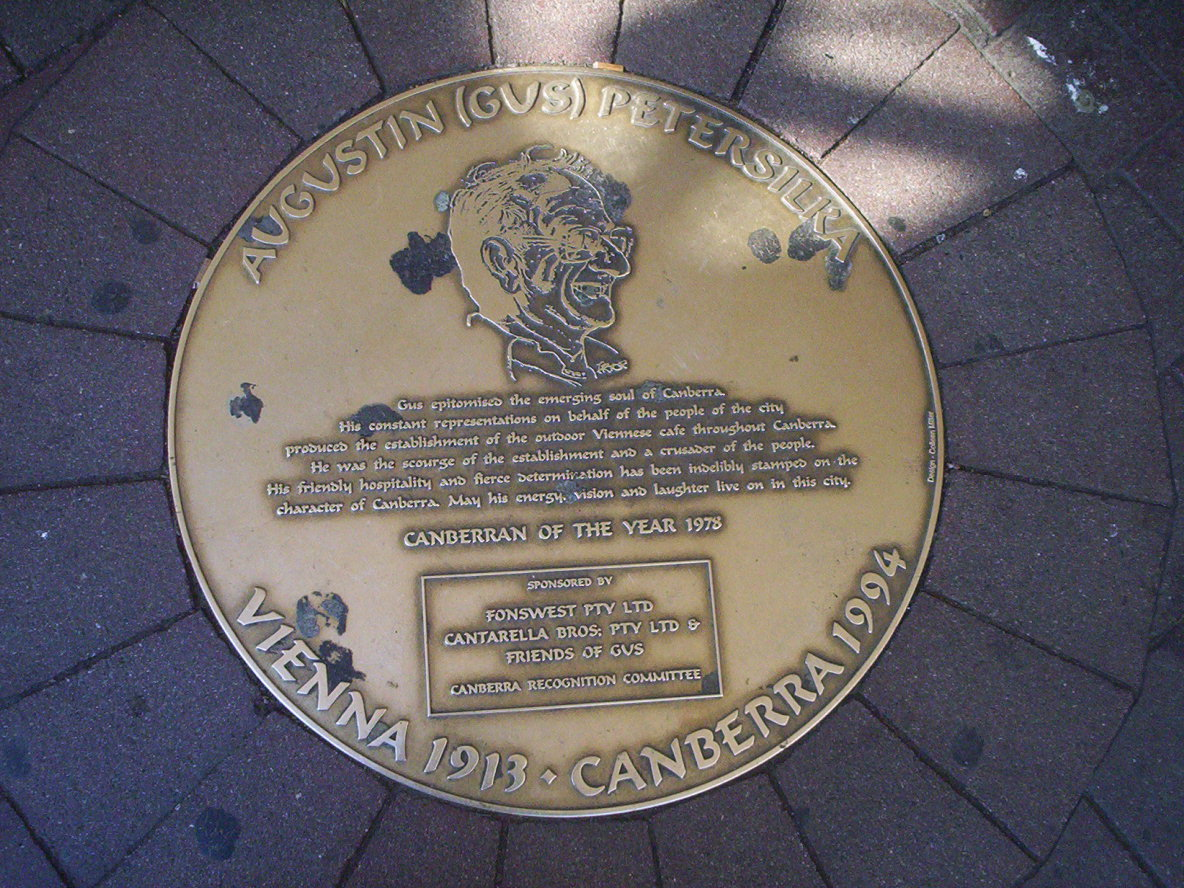
Plaque to Gus Petersilka, near Gus's cafe

Gus's Cafe was a café located in Civic, Canberra, Australia. It opened in 1969 and later became the first outdoor pavement cafe in Canberra. It was one of the oldest and best known cafes in Canberra and one of the first European-style cafes in Australia. It had both outdoor and indoor dining areas. The cafe closed in January 2024, but is intended to be re-opened in several years. It will be at the base of the Garema Place Hotel, which will occupy the café's original space.

== History ==
The cafe was established by Augustin 'Gus' Petersilka (20 July 1918 – 23 October 1994) who emigrated to Australia from Austria in 1951 and arrived in Canberra in 1962. Petersilka had difficulties with introducing this new style of dining to Canberra as it was against the regulations of the time for people to sit outside in a cafe or restaurant, and he had several well-publicised clashes with bureaucrats.

A plaque in the pavement on Bunda Street outside the original Gus's cafe marks the occasion of Gus Petersilka being made the Canberran of the Year for 1978. It reads:

Gus epitomised the emerging soul of Canberra. His constant representations on behalf of the people of the city produced the establishment of the outdoor Viennese cafe throughout Canberra. He was the scourge of the establishment and a crusader of the people. His friendly hospitality and fierce determination has been indelibly stamped on the character of Canberra. May his energy, vision and laughter live on in this city.

Petersilka was commemorated on 14 November 2002, by having a street named after him in the Canberra district of Gungahlin. The cafe was heritage listed in 2011.

On 11 March 2011, Gus's was added to the Australian Capital Territory Heritage Register. The listing requires the conservation of the "intangible social value attributed to the location Gus’ café" and a plaque dedicated to the cafe rather than the cafe itself.

On 9 March 2012, Gus's was temporarily closed down by the ACT Health Directorate for serious food safety breaches and risks to the public.

The cafe closed in late June 2016 and was sold. It re-opened in September 2017 as Gus' Place.

Gus' Place closed on 14 January 2024 ahead of the demolition of the building it was located in to build a luxury hotel. The proposed design for the hotel includes a new cafe to be called Gus' Place which will be located at the site of the previous cafe.
