= John Butters =

Australian electrical engineer

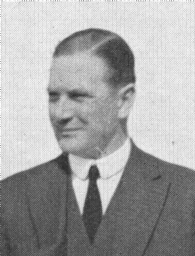
John Butters, 10 May 1927

Sir John Henry Butters, CMG, MBE (23 December 1885 – 29 July 1969) was an Australian electrical engineer notable for his role in the Tasmanian Hydro-electric Department from 1914 to 1924, and as the head of the Federal Capital Commission, which developed Canberra between 1925 and 1930.

== Biography ==
Butters was born in Hampshire, England, and trained as an electrical engineer at Hartley College, Southampton. He moved to Australia in 1909.

He is best known for his role as Chief Commissioner of the Federal Capital Commission. The FCC was active during the early expansion of the new federal capital, Canberra, and was successful in planning and building many significant buildings. For his role in the city's development he is sometimes referred to as the 'Founder of Canberra'.

Butters left Canberra in 1929 for Sydney, where he made a career as a consulting engineer, which continued until his retirement in 1954.

When he died, personal papers and diaries were not available, and the subsequent attempt at biography has proved difficult.

== Honours ==
He was appointed a Member of the Order of the British Empire (MBE) on 19 October 1920, "in recognition of service during the war".

On 1 June 1923 he was made a Companion of the Order of St Michael and St George (CMG) for his work as Chief Engineer of the Tasmania Hydro-Electric Department.

On 8 July 1927, Butters was knighted to honour his work as Commissioner of the Federal Capital Commission.

Butters Drive in the Canberra suburb of Phillip is named in his honour. He was an inaugural inductee into the Canberra Engineering Hall of Fame.

John Butters Power Station in Tasmania is named after him.

The Butters Bridge in the Molonglo Valley, Canberra is also named after him and was opened in September 2016. It is the longest pedestrian bridge in the Southern Hemisphere.
