= Heather Shakespeare =

Heather Gladys Shakespeare
- Born: Heather Cameron; 25 July 1909; Canberra, ACT
- Died: 28 September 2008 (aged 99)
- Employer: The Canberra Times

Heather Shakespeare OAM (25 July 1909 – 28 September 2008) was an important person in the early days of The Canberra Times. She was also a foundation member of the Canberra and District Historical Society.

== Early life ==
She was born Heather Gladys Cameron, at Weetangera, a sheep farm near what is now the Canberra suburb of Belconnen. She was one of five children. She had a scholarship to attend Goulburn High School, which paid for her train fare and boarding expenses. She later completing a secretarial course in Canberra. She got her first job with the Queanbeyan Age newspaper, but left to work in a local motor garage. She then worked as a stenographer at the Australian General Electric Company until it closed in 1929, at the beginning of the Great Depression. Heather, aged 19, was then employed as secretary to the Managing Director at the Canberra Times. The Canberra Times had started publication on 3 September 1926.

== Newspapers ==
At the Canberra Times, she did a lot of other jobs as well as being secretary; she served at the counter, did the banking, paid the wages, as well as all the company correspondence. For many years she was the only female employed by the company. In 1938 she became Company Secretary after the paper's founder and Managing Director, Thomas (T.M.) Shakespeare, died. She eventually became a company director as well. In 1962 she became engaged to the Managing Director and Board Chairman, Arthur Shakespeare. Arthur had been the first editor of the paper. She resigned from the company and they were married on 12 January 1963 at St Ninian's Presbyterian Church.

The Canberra Times was sold to John Fairfax Limited in 1964. Arthur Shakespeare continued to work as chairman of a board that Fairfax set up to oversee the paper. Arthur died in 1975. The Canberra Times was later sold to Kerry Packer's Consolidated Press.

== Later life ==
Heather was interested in history and became one of the founding members of the Canberra and District Historical Society. She was an active member of the community and was involved in the scouting movement, the Young Women's Christian Association (YWCA) (President of the board from 1955-1960), the Business and Professional Women's Club, and the Country Women's Association. She was a charter member and later president of the Soroptomists International of Canberra.

In 1997, she was awarded the Medal of the Order of Australia (OAM).

== External sources ==
- Heather Shakespeare interviewed by John Farquharson
