= Alan Fitzgerald (satirist) =

Australian author and journalist (1935–2011)

Member of the Australian Capital Territory Advisory Council
- In office September 1967 – September 1974

Personal details
- Born: 5 November 1935 Sydney
- Died: 31 March 2011 (aged 75) Canberra
- Party: True Whig (1967–1970); Australia Party (1970–1974); Better Management Team (1992)
- Spouse: Maria
- Children: 2 sons
- Education: ANU (BA)
- Occupation: Author, journalist and satirist

Alan John Fitzgerald (5 November 1935 – 31 March 2011) was an Australian author, journalist and satirist. He was known for his unwavering opposition to the Australian republican movement and worked alongside Tony Abbott during Abbott's tenure as president of Australians for Constitutional Monarchy (ACM) during the 1990s.

Fitzgerald was a significant figure in the founding of the National Press Club, serving as president for several years. As a journalist, he provided his services to numerous publications and programmes, in both print and radio journalism, including The Herald, The Age, The Bulletin and The Sunday Australian. He also achieved considerable recognition as an author, having developed a niche in which he wrote about Canberran history and culture; Fitzgerald's Canberra and Life in Canberra are two notable examples of his writing in this area. Fitzgerald had been writing a book on the Irish Australian experience at the time of his death.

== Biography ==
Born in Sydney, Fitzgerald graduated from the Australian National University with a Bachelor of Arts degree (English and Political Science).

He lived in the Canberra suburb of Isaacs with his wife, Maria; they had two sons and six grandchildren.

== Career ==
He arrived in Canberra in 1964 from Fiji, where he had gone to join The Fiji Times, then owned by Pacific Publications, Sydney. However, he was also invited by editor, John Douglas Pringle, to write satirical columns for The Canberra Times, having met Pringle in London some years earlier. He joined the National Capital Development Commission (NCDC) and then became its Director of Public Information. After its abolition in 1989 (and 20 years with the NCDC), Fitzgerald transferred into the same position at the National Capital Planning Authority. He became a member of the Federal Parliamentary Press Gallery.

He later broadened his opinion pieces, writing for The Sun-Herald, The Sunday Observer, The Sunday Australian, The Bulletin, The Sydney Morning Herald and The Age. He was also a correspondent for CBC-Ottawa in 1974, and as well conducted his own current affairs program for nine years on Canberra radio station 2CA. He was also a frequent contributor to ABC radio programs and made regular appearances on Channel Seven's breakfast program.

== Politics ==
In 1967, Fitzgerald was elected to the ACT Advisory Council for the True Whig Party, promising to take no action as a mock platform. He was re-elected in 1970, with 21% of the vote, as an Australia Party candidate, ahead of the Liberal Party candidates and second only to the Labor Party (ALP) team. For many years, Fitzgerald was a member and chairman of the ACT Historic Sites and Building Committee (later renamed the Heritage Council), a body that had been established at his initiative. The Committee sought to protect historic homesteads and buildings, during a time when Canberra was rapidly being extended into surrounding rural areas.

In May 1970, Fitzgerald stood for the Australia Party (founded by Gordon Barton) in the May 1970 ACT by-election for the House of Representatives. He won 17.5 percent on first preferences, the highest vote of any Australia Party candidate in a federal election, but was eliminated from the vote count in the final distribution of preferences. Fitzgerald again stood as an Australia Party candidate for the same seat at the 1972 federal election.

He did not stand for election again until the 1992 Australian Capital Territory election, where he was a member of Harold Hird's Better Management Team. None of that team were elected.

Fitzgerald was elected the President of the National Press Club for two terms, 1969–70 and 1970–71, and remained on the committee for many years. As a monarchist, he was a founding member and chairman of the ACT & Region branch of the ACM and played an active role in the Australian republican debate. In 1998, he was the ACM's primary candidate in the election of delegates to the Constitutional Convention, but lost on a final distribution of preferences to the ARM candidate, Frank Cassidy.

== Death ==
Fitzgerald died of cancer on 31 March 2011, aged 75.

== Bibliography ==
- Fitzgerald's Canberra: A Guide to Life in the National Capital. Dalton Publishing. 1969, 1970 and 1971. ISBN 0-909906-00-9
- The Best of Fitzgerald. Dalton Publishing. 1970.
- Old Fitz's Unparliamentary Handbook. Clareville Press. 1976.
- Historic Canberra, 1825-1945. Australian Government Publishing. 1977.
- Italian Farming Soldiers: PoWs in Australia, 1941-47. Melbourne University Press. 1981.
- Alan Fitzgerald's Canberra with cartoons by George Molnar. Clareville Press. 1983.
- Canberra's Engineering Heritage. (Editor). Clareville Press. 1983.
- Canberra and the New Parliament House. Lansdowne Press. 1983.
- Canberra in Two Centuries – A Pictorial History. Clareville Press. 1987.
- Victory: 1945, War & Peace. Gore & Osment/Australian War Memorial. 1995.
- Barons, Rebels & Romantics – The Fitzgeralds' First Thousand Years. Clareville Press. 2004.
- The Italian Farming Soldiers. Clareville Press. Revised editions; 1999, 2007.
- A Big Head (And coping). Random House. 1992.
