= Arthur Shakespeare =

Australian journalist (1897–1975)

Arthur Thomas Shakespeare (27 September 1897 – 11 October 1975) was an Australian journalist and newspaper editor, best known for founding the Australian Capital Territory's most widely circulated commercial newspaper, The Canberra Times. He was son of Thomas Shakespeare, founder of the Federal Capital Press of Australia.

== Early life ==
Shakespeare was born in Condobolin and educated at Grafton and Fort Street Boys' High School, Sydney. In 1916 he commenced work at the Sydney Morning Herald and eventually obtained the position of sub-editor.

== The Canberra Times ==
In 1926 Shakespeare founded The Canberra Times, the Australian Capital Territory's second newspaper. As of 2009 it remains Canberra's widest-circulated commercial newspaper. Shakespeare continued to own the paper until 1964, when, facing pressure from Rupert Murdoch's new paper The Australian, he chose to sell the paper to the Fairfax group.

== Marriage ==
On 15 October 1927, Shakespeare married Marjorie Agnew Patten. Marjorie died in 1961.

On 12 January 1963, Shakespeare married Heather Gladys Cameron (subsequently Heather Shakespeare), who at that time was secretary to the managing director of Federal Capital Press (Arthur's father, Thomas Shakespeare). The marriage occurred at St Ninian's Presbyterian Church. Heather Shakespeare died on 28 September 2008 at the age of 99.

== Community work ==
Shakespeare served on the executive of more than 40 organisations.

As chairman of The Canberra Times, he served as president of the Country Press Association, secretary and president of the Australian Provincial Press Association, and director of the Australian United Press Ltd. He also was a member of the Provincial Press Accreditation Bureau and the Commonwealth Press Union.

He was a member of the Australian Capital Territory Advisory Council from 1945 - 1955 (serving as chairman in 1953).

Other community associations included the council of the Australian National University, the Canberra Chamber of Commerce, Rotary, YMCA, the Eisteddfod Association and the Committee on Cultural Development.

== Canberra Television Ltd ==
In 1957, Federal Capital Press Ltd founded Canberra Television Ltd, of which Arthur Shakespeare was chairman. The primary business of Canberra Television Ltd was to broadcast the television station CTC 7.

The station was licensed to operate in 1960. It made its first test transmission on 23 May 1962 and commenced public transmission on 2 June 1962.

It broadcast on VHF7 from a transmitter atop Black Mountain. As of 2009, CTC 7 still broadcasts in the Canberra area under the branding of Southern Cross Ten.

== Death ==
Arthur Shakespeare died on 11 October 1975 and was buried in Canberra Cemetery.

== Honours and commemoration ==
In April 2005, Shakespeare was named by ACT Chief Minister Jon Stanhope as one of the 17 inaugural inductees in the ACT Honour Walk. This commemoration took the form of a plaque set into the pedestrian space in Ainslie Avenue, Canberra City, which bears the text: "Arthur Shakespeare. Founding editor of The Canberra Times, who helped develop a distinct vision for Canberra in its early years. Served on the executive of more than 40 organisations and the ACT Advisory Council."
