= Rose Andrew =

Australian Capital Territory politician

Rose Andrew was an Australian politician.

In the 1950s she was the President of the Canberra Branch of the Country Women's Association.

She was elected as an independent to the Australian Capital Territory Advisory Council in 1961 as part of Trevor Harrison's group. In 1962 she proposed the construction of a heated swimming pool. She supported the established of self-government for the ACT. She did not stand for re-election in 1964.
