= Phil Day (town planner) =

Philip Denny Day (1924 – 17 March 2011) was an Australian town planner and politician.

Day was educated at Yeronga before attending Anglican Church Grammar School in Brisbane. He began studying law but enlisted in the Australian Army during World War II, serving for three years after the war in occupied Japan as an intelligence officer. He graduated in 1953 and joined the public service in Canberra, and was also elected to the Australian Capital Territory Advisory Council, serving from 1955 to 1957 as a Liberal and then from 1957 to 1959 as an Independent. He was an Independent candidate for the Division of Australian Capital Territory in the 1958 Australian federal election.

He subsequently moved to Sydney, where he trained in town and country planning. Initially with the Department of Local Government, he moved to the Department of Decentralisation and Development in 1968, eventually becoming director. He was next director of town planning for Brisbane City Council, and then moved to the University of Queensland, where he was head of school from 1977 to 1980, when he moved to the Australian Institute of Urban Studies as director. He retired from the Institute and wrote his last report in 1989 as a member of the Chalk Committee of Inquiry into Valuation and Rating. From 1987 he was editor of Queensland Planner, and wrote frequently for The Courier-Mail. In his eighties he published Hijacked Inheritance, based on his doctorate thesis which he had completed at the age of 77. Day died in 2011.
