= Federal Territory Vigilance Association =

The Federal Territory Vigilance Association was an Australian lobby group set up to represent the interests of landholders whose property was resumed to form the Australian Capital Territory. It was formed in 1911 by settlers who considered that their social and family lives were disrupted by the take over of their land, in addition to faring poorly economically. The Australian Commonwealth government paid well below the market price for their land and took many years to pay out. They held meeting with the home affairs minister King O'Malley as well as Prime Ministers and a Treasurer. Some concessions were won from the government, but larger landholders got a better result.
