= Mary Steel Stevenson =

Australian activist

Mary Steel Stevenson MBE (née Kelly; 21 August 1896 – 3 July 1985) was a Scottish-born Australian community and political activist.

== Biography ==
She was born in Maybole in Scotland, attending North Kelvinside School in Glasgow. In January 1925 she married Robert Stevenson, and they emigrated to Queanbeyan in New South Wales in March 1925, moving to the Canberra suburb of Griffith in 1926. The couple had one son, John. Stevenson was involved with the Citizens' Rights League, a group formed in 1927 to advocate for federal parliamentary representation for the Australian Capital Territory; she lobbied Prime Minister John Curtin for the League.

She was a commandant of No. 750 Voluntary Aid Detachment during the Second World War, and was awarded a citation from the Duchess of Gloucester in her capacity as spouse of the Governor-General. She was also awarded a Red Cross Medal for her work as an executive member of the ACT's Red Cross Society. From 1940 to 1942 she was President of the Young Women's Christian Association of Canberra. After the war she was elected to the board of Canberra Community Hospital, and also served on the ACT Tourist Bureau Advisory Board and as Girl Guides Divisional Commissioner.

Stevenson was a founding member of the Liberal Party of Australia's Canberra branch on 27 January 1949, becoming president of the Women's Branch and an executive member of the NSW party. She was elected to the Australian Capital Territory Advisory Council in 1951, a position she would hold until 1959. She was awarded the Queen Elizabeth II Coronation Medal in 1953. In 1954 she was the Liberal candidate for the ACT's federal seat, losing to the sitting Labor member. She was appointed a Member of the Order of the British Empire later that year, and continued to be involved in a wide variety of community organisations, including the National Council of Women, the Business and Professional Women's Association, the United Nations Association, Soroptimist International, the Victoria League, the Sub-Normal and Incapacitated Children's Association, the Order of the Eastern Star, and the Pan-Pacific Women's Association. She died in Canberra in 1985.

Stevenson's granddaughter, Meredith Hunter, served in the Australian Capital Territory Legislative Assembly as convenor of the ACT Greens from 2008 to 2012.

== See also ==
- List of the first women holders of political offices in Oceania
