= 1970 Australian Capital Territory by-election =

- 30 May 1970
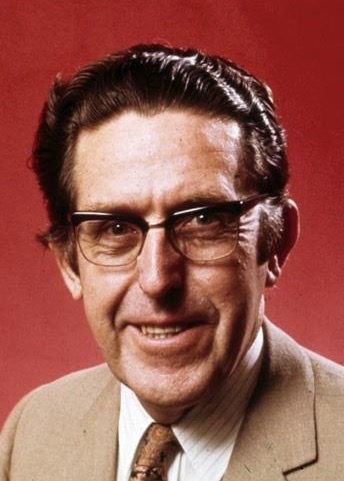

	First party	Second party
Candidate	Kep Enderby	Clarrie Hermes
Party	Labor	Liberal
Popular vote	20,132	15,900
Percentage	35.6%	28.1%
Swing	▼32.1pp	▲1.2pp
TPP	57.8%	42.2%
TPP swing	▼13.4pp	▲13.4pp
	Third party	Fourth party
	AUS	IND
Candidate	Alan Fitzgerald	Jim Pead
Party	Australia	Independent
Popular vote	9,914	8,151
Percentage	17.5%	14.4%
Swing	▲12.9pp	▲14.4pp
MP before election
Jim Fraser
Labor
Elected MP
Kep Enderby
Labor

A by-election was held for the Australian House of Representatives seat of Australian Capital Territory on 30 May 1970. This was triggered by the death of Labor MP Jim Fraser.

The by-election was won by Labor candidate Kep Enderby. It was also notable for recording the highest vote ever received in a federal electorate by an Australia Party candidate.

Ted Cawthron from the National Socialist Party of Australia was the first National Socialist in Australia to run for public office.

== Results ==
Australian Capital Territory by-election, 1970
Party	Candidate	Votes	%	±%
Labor	Kep Enderby	20,132	35.6	−32.1
Liberal	Clarrie Hermes	15,900	28.1	+1.2
Australia	Alan Fitzgerald	9,914	17.5	+12.9
Independent	Jim Pead	8,151	14.4	+14.4
Democratic Labor	Terence Christie	1,857	3.3	+3.3
Independent	Charles Bellchambers	438	0.8	+0.8
National Socialist	Ted Cawthron	173	0.3	+0.3
Total formal votes		56,565	96.9	
Informal votes		1,813	3.1	
Turnout		58,378	90.5	
Two-party-preferred result
Labor	Kep Enderby	32,690	57.8	−13.4
Liberal	Clarrie Hermes	23,875	42.2	+13.4
Labor hold		Swing	−13.4	
