= Kep Enderby =

Australian politician (1926–2015)

The Honourable Kep Enderby QC
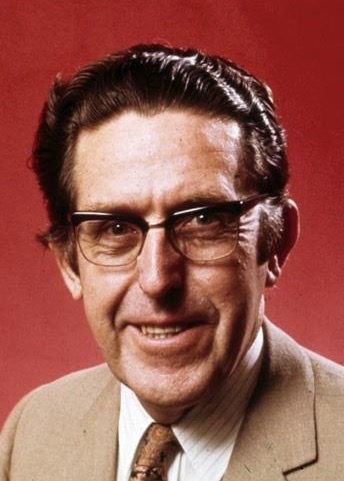

Attorney-General for Australia
- In office 10 February 1975 – 11 November 1975
- Prime Minister: Gough Whitlam
- Preceded by: Lionel Murphy
- Succeeded by: Ivor Greenwood

Minister for Manufacturing Industry
- In office 9 October 1973 – 10 February 1975
- Prime Minister: Gough Whitlam
- Preceded by: Dr Jim Cairns
- Succeeded by: Jim McClelland

Minister for the Capital Territory
- In office 19 December 1972 – 9 October 1973
- Prime Minister: Gough Whitlam
- Preceded by: office established
- Succeeded by: Gordon Bryant

Member of the Australian Parliament for Australian Capital Territory
- In office 30 May 1970 – 18 May 1974
- Preceded by: Jim Fraser
- Succeeded by: Division abolished

Member of the Australian Parliament for Canberra
- In office 18 May 1974 – 13 December 1975
- Preceded by: New seat
- Succeeded by: John Haslem

Personal details
- Born: 25 June 1926 Dubbo, Australia
- Died: 7 January 2015 (aged 88)
- Party: Labor
- Education: University of Sydney
- Occupation: Barrister

Keppel Earl Enderby QC (25 June 1926 – 7 January 2015) was an Australian politician and judge. Enderby was a member of the House of Representatives, representing the Australian Labor Party between 1970 and 1975 and became a senior cabinet minister in the Gough Whitlam government. After politics, he was appointed a Justice of the Supreme Court of New South Wales.

== Early years ==
Enderby was born in Dubbo, New South Wales and educated at Dubbo High School. His parents were milk-bar proprietors. He was a trainee pilot in the Royal Australian Air Force in 1944 and 1945. He studied law at the University of Sydney from 1946 to 1950 and was admitted to the New South Wales bar in 1950. He was a successful amateur golfer. He won the 1946 New South Wales Amateur Championship beating defending champion Alan Waterson in the semi-final and John Allerton in the final. He represented New South Wales in the Australian Men's Interstate Teams Matches in 1946, 1947, 1948 and 1949. From 1950 to 1954, he worked as a barrister in London and studied at the University of London. He also played golf in the British Amateur and Open championships in 1951 and 1952.

He returned to New South Wales in 1955 and practised law and lectured at Sydney Technical College. Enderby was active with Ken Buckley in the foundation of the New South Wales Council for Civil Liberties in the 1950s and 1960s. In 1962, he became a lecturer in law at the Australian National University in Canberra. In 1966, he began practising law in Canberra while continuing to teach part-time. He was appointed a Queen's Counsel (QC) in 1973.

== Political career ==
In 1970, Enderby gained Australian Labor Party (ALP) pre-selection for the Division of Australian Capital Territory (ACT) and was subsequently elected to the House of Representatives at a by-election following Jim Fraser's death in April 1970. As the Federal member for the ACT, Kep Enderby was involved in Parliamentary debate over the 1971 Canberra flood. Following Whitlam's victory at the 1972 election, Enderby was appointed as the first Minister for the Capital Territory and the first Minister for the Northern Territory in the December 1972 ministry, replacing the former portfolio of the Interior. In October 1973, he lost these posts, partly because his ACT portfolio made him responsible for implementing policies that were unpopular in his electorate. Instead, he became Minister for Secondary Industry and Minister for Supply. Enderby became the last Minister for Supply—a portfolio which had been established at the beginning of World War II and included responsibility for government munitions factories—when Supply and Secondary Industry were merged into the Manufacturing Industry portfolio in the June 1974 ministry. It was during this time that he made what has become his most famous utterance: "Traditionally, Australia obtains its imports from overseas."

In February 1975, following Lionel Murphy's appointment to the High Court of Australia, Enderby became Attorney-General and Minister for Customs and Excise. One of his first actions was to introduce a bill to decriminalize abortion and homosexuality in the Australian Capital Territory. The Customs and Excise portfolio was renamed Police and Customs in March 1975, reflecting the government's decision to establish the Australia Police. The Police and Customs portfolio was reassigned to Jim Cavanagh in June 1975.

Enderby was elected to the new seat of Canberra at the 1974 election, but was one of many Labor members to lose their seats in the landslide 1975 election defeat that followed the dismissal of the Whitlam Government .

== After politics ==
Enderby moved to Sydney and returned to the bar, where he practised as a barrister. From 1982 until his retirement in 1992, he was a judge of the Supreme Court of New South Wales. In 1997, he was appointed head of the Serious Offenders Review Council, during which time he said that up to 80 per cent of the nation's prisoners should not be behind bars. In June 2000, the NSW Government decided not to re-appoint him when his term expired, but said the move was not related to his outspoken views.

Enderby held a number of community positions throughout his career, including presiding over the regional society for voluntary euthanasia. Additionally, after learning Esperanto in 1987, Enderby became involved in Esperanto organisations, including serving as President of the Australian Esperanto Association from 1992 to 1997, as a committee member of the Universal Esperanto Association from 1992 to 2004, as President of the Esperanto Law Association from 1996 to 2002 and from 1998 to 2001 as President of the Universal Esperanto Association.

Political offices
Preceded by Ralph Hunt (Interior)	Minister for the Capital Territory; 1972–1973	Succeeded by Gordon Bryant
Preceded by Ralph Hunt (Interior)	Minister for the Northern Territory; 1972–1973	Succeeded by Rex Patterson
Preceded by Jim Cairns	Minister for Secondary Industry/ Minister for Manufacturing Industry; 1973–1975	Succeeded by Jim McClelland
Preceded by Lance Barnard	Minister for Supply; 1973–1974	Merged into Manufacturing Industry
Preceded by Lionel Murphy	Attorney-General; 1975	Succeeded by Ivor Greenwood
Preceded by Lionel Murphy	Minister for Customs and Excise/ Minister for Police and Customs; 1975	Succeeded by Jim Cavanagh
Parliament of Australia
Preceded by Jim Fraser	Member for Australian Capital Territory; 1970–1974	Abolished
New title	Member for Canberra; 1974–1975	Succeeded by John Haslem
Universal Esperanto Association
Preceded by Lee Chong-Yeong	President; 1998–2001	Succeeded by Renato Corsetti
