= Jim Pead =

Australian politician

James Harold Pead OBE (3 April 1924 – 15 November 2009) was an Australian politician.

== ACT politics ==
He was an independent member of the Australian Capital Territory Legislative Assembly for Canberra from 1975 to 1979, and then elected from the same electorate for the renamed House of Assembly from 1979 to 1982. He served as the first President of the Assembly from 1975 to 1979. Previously he had served on the predecessor body the Australian Capital Territory Advisory Council from 1955 to 1974, acting as president from 1964. Pead helped establish the Yarralumla Progress Association in the early 1950s, which led to his involvement in the Australian Capital Territory Progress and Welfare Council, and was elected as a Progress candidate from 1955 until it dissolved in the mid 1960s. From 1967 onwards he was an Independent candidate.

== Federal politics ==
Pead was also an Independent candidate in the 1970 Australian Capital Territory by-election.

== Personal life ==
After retiring from politics in 1982 Pead moved to Queensland, where he died in 2009. He was awarded a state funeral in Canberra at St Christopher's Cathedral, Canberra. Pead's son Gary has been politically active as an Independent candidate in the 1989 Australian Capital Territory election, for the Senate for Queensland in the 2016 Australian federal election, for the Electoral district of Mermaid Beach in the 2017 Queensland state election and for the Electoral district of Mudgeeraba in the 2020 Queensland state election. He was a Queensland Greens candidate for the Electoral district of Mudgeeraba in the 2006 Queensland state election, a Labor candidate for the Electoral district of Mermaid Beach in the 2015 Queensland state election, and an Independents For Climate Action Now candidate for the Senate for Queensland in the 2019 Australian federal election.
