= Lewis Nott =

Australian politician

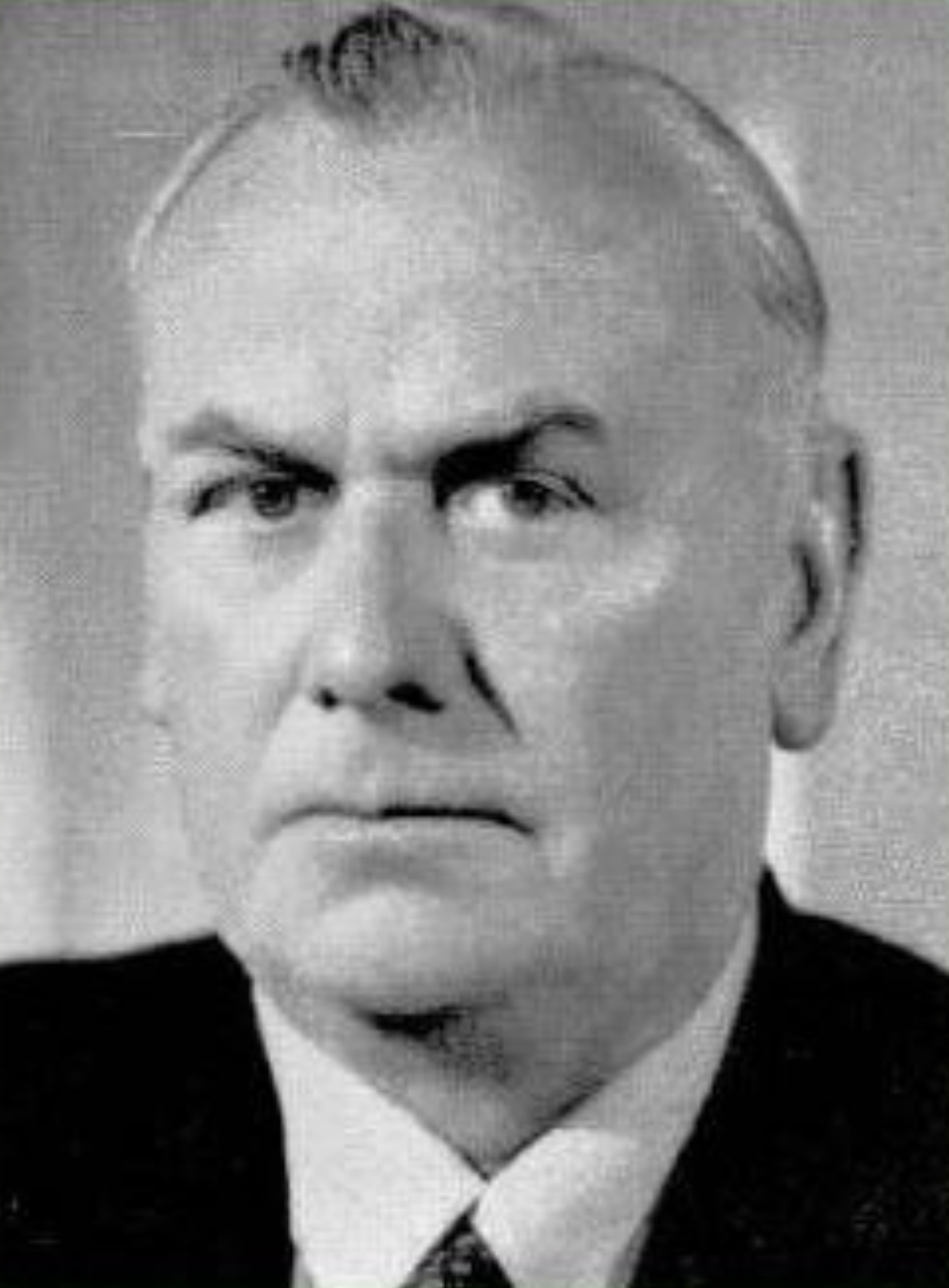

Member of the Australian Parliament for Herbert
- In office 14 November 1925 – 17 November 1928
- Preceded by: Fred Bamford
- Succeeded by: George Martens

Member of the Australian Parliament for Australian Capital Territory
- In office 10 December 1949 – 28 April 1951
- Preceded by: New seat
- Succeeded by: Jim Fraser

Personal details
- Born: 12 February 1886 Bundaberg, Queensland
- Died: 27 October 1951 (aged 65) Melbourne
- Party: Nationalist (1925–1931); UAP (1931–1945); Independent (1945–1951)
- Spouse: Doris Ashbury
- Occupation: Medical practitioner

Military service
- Allegiance: United Kingdom
- Branch/service: British Army
- Rank: Captain
- Battles/wars: First World War
- Awards: Mentioned in Despatches (2)

Lewis Windermere Nott (12 February 1886 – 27 October 1951) was an Australian politician, medical practitioner and hospital superintendent. He represented two federal electorates, more than 1,000 kilometres (620 mi) and 21 years apart.

== Early life and war service ==
Nott was born at Windermere, a sugar-plantation located near Bundaberg, Queensland. He was the son of Frederick Lewis Nott, a planter, and Jean Blair. His older brother Frederick Lancelot was later a member of the Legislative Assembly of Queensland. Lewis Nott was educated at Maryborough Grammar School, Queensland. He then studied assaying at the School of Mines and Industries, Ballarat, Victoria before undertaking a medical degree at the University of Sydney. In 1913, he married Doris Ashbury in the Sydney suburb of Woolwich. Ashbury was the granddaughter of John Ingham Aspinall, a member of the well-known Aspinall family.

They travelled to Scotland, where Nott continued studying medicine at the Royal College of Surgeons of Edinburgh, the Royal College of Physicians of Edinburgh, and the Royal College of Physicians and Surgeons of Glasgow. Following the outbreak of the First World War, he enlisted in the Royal Scots and rose to captain and made adjutant. In 1916 he was wounded and twice mentioned in despatches. He resigned his commission and resumed his medical training in December 1916. On graduation in 1918 he joined the Royal Army Medical Corps and in 1919 worked at the Pilkington Special (Orthopaedic) Hospital, St Helens, Lancashire.

== Medical practitioner and politician ==
Nott returned to Australia and took part in the campaign against hookworm and then was appointed medical superintendent of Mackay District Hospital. From 1924 to 1927 he was mayor of Mackay. In 1925 he won the seat of Herbert, then including Mackay and Townsville, in Federal Parliament for the Nationalist Party. In this contest he unexpectedly defeated the Australian Labor Party candidate Ted Theodore, who had resigned as Premier of Queensland to enter federal politics (he had to wait for a by-election in 1927 in a Sydney seat before he was successful). In 1928 Nott lost the seat to the Labor candidate, George Martens. He ran unsuccessfully as a Nationalist in North Sydney (1929) and as a member of the Nationalists' successor, the United Australia Party, in Calare (1934) and East Sydney (1940).

Nott moved to Canberra in 1927, the year that it became the national capital. In 1929 he was appointed Medical Superintendent of the Canberra Hospital and held this position until 1934 and from 1941 to 1949. He was also a private practitioner throughout this period.

Nott campaigned for the creation of an advisory council for the Federal Capital Territory (in 1938 renamed the Australian Capital Territory, ACT) and was elected as a member of the council from 1935 to 1949. In 1949, he was elected as an independent as the first representative of the Division of Australian Capital Territory in the Federal Parliament, where he had unlimited speaking rights but could only vote on matters affecting the ACT. His break in parliamentary service of 21 years (1928–1949) is a record for the Australian parliament. He was one of the few people who have represented more than one state or territory in the Parliament, and the only one to represent both a state and a territory.

Nott was defeated by the Labor candidate Jim Fraser in the 1951 election. He was subsequently appointed as medical officer at the Newborough Clinic, Yallourn, Victoria, but collapsed on the flight to Melbourne and died the next day of leukemia in Royal Melbourne Hospital and is buried in the Presbyterian Section of the Woden Cemetery, Canberra.

== Family ==
Lewis and Doris Nott had three sons and two daughters. Their first two sons, born overseas, died young, at ages 11 years and 10 years respectively, in Sydney, New South Wales. They were followed by two daughters born in Queensland. The older daughter moved to Canada where she married. The second daughter, Lyndal, who was an ice skater, died in a laboratory accident on 10 April 1966 in Canberra. Their third son was born in Canberra. One of his grandchildren, Matthew Nott, is a surgeon and environmentalist.

Parliament of Australia
Preceded by Fred Bamford	Member for Herbert; 1925–1928	Succeeded by George Martens
New division	Member for Australian Capital Territory; 1949–1951	Succeeded by Jim Fraser
