= 1951 Australian federal election =

- 28 April 1951

All 123 (Note: The Northern Territory and Australian Capital Territory each had one seat, but members for the territories did not have full voting rights until 1966 and did not count toward government formation.) seats of the House of Representatives 61 seats were needed for a majority in the House All 60 seats of the Senate
- Opinion polls
- Registered: 4,962,675 ▲1.38%
- Turnout: 4,654,406 (96.00%) (Note: Turnout in contested seats) (▲0.03 pp)
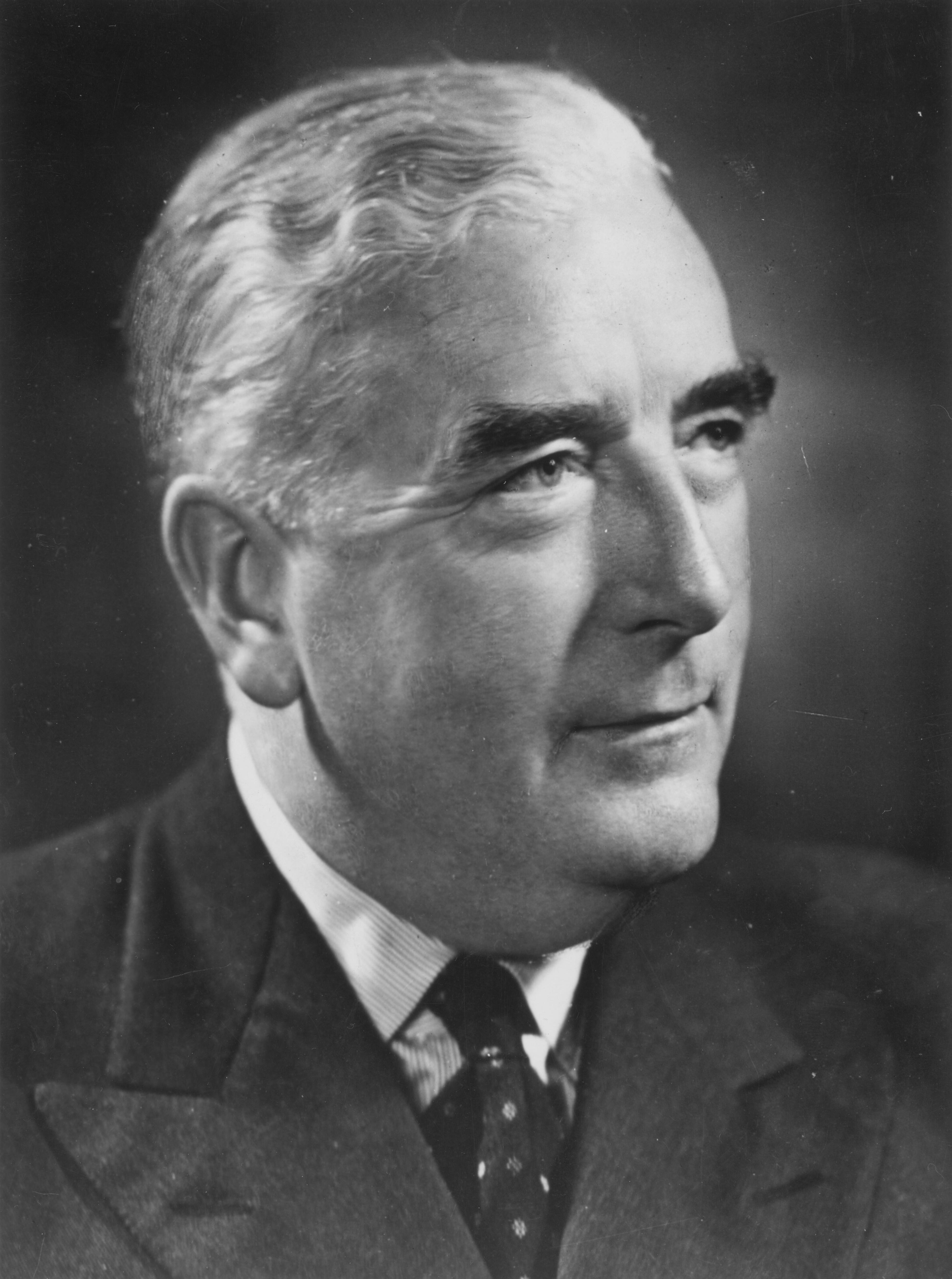

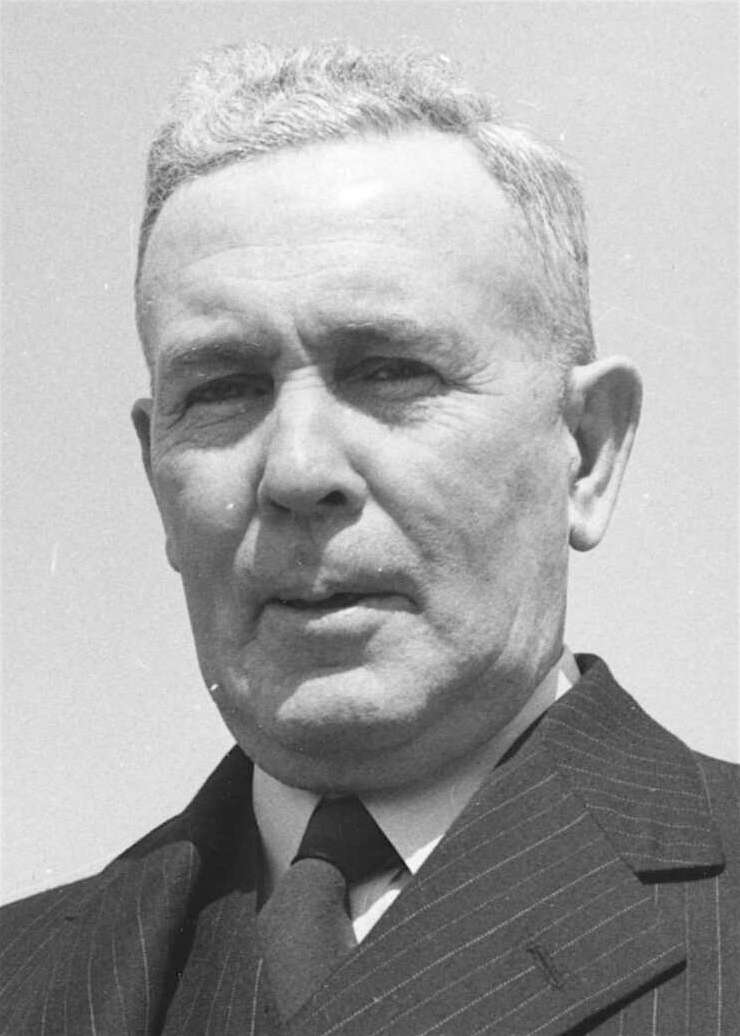
	First party	Second party
Leader	Robert Menzies	Ben Chifley
Party	Liberal–Country; Coalition	Labor
Leader since	21 February 1945	13 July 1945
Leader's seat	Kooyong (Vic.)	Macquarie (NSW)
Last election	74 seats	47 seats
Seats won	69	52 + NT + ACT
Seat change	▼5	▲6
Primary vote	2,298,512	2,174,840
Percentage	50.34%	47.63%
Swing	▲0.08	▲1.65
TPP	50.70%	49.30%
TPP	▼0.30	▲0.30
- Results by division for the House of Representatives, shaded by winning party's margin of victory.
Prime Minister before election
Robert Menzies
Liberal/Country coalition
Subsequent Prime Minister
Robert Menzies
Liberal/Country coalition

A federal election was held in Australia on 28 April 1951. All 121 seats in the House of Representatives and all 60 seats in the Senate were up for election, due to a double dissolution called after the Senate rejected the Commonwealth Bank Bill. The incumbent Liberal–Country coalition led by Prime Minister Robert Menzies defeated the opposition Labor Party led by Ben Chifley with a modestly reduced majority, and secured a majority in the Senate. Chifley died just over a month after the election.

== Issues ==
Although the Coalition had won a comfortable majority in the House in 1949, Labor still had a four-seat majority in the Senate. Chifley thus made it his business to obstruct Menzies's agenda at every opportunity. Realizing this, Menzies sought to call a double dissolution at the first opportunity in hopes of gaining control of both houses. He thought he had his chance in 1950, when he introduced a bill to ban the Australian Communist Party. However, after a redraft, Chifley let the bill pass.

A few months later, the Senate rejected the Commonwealth Bank Bill 1950, in which the Coalition government aimed to establish a "Commonwealth Bank Board", which Labor believed would be filled with private banking interests. This finally gave Menzies an excuse to call a double dissolution. While the Coalition lost five House seats to Labor, it still had a solid mandate. More importantly, it picked up six Senate seats, giving it control over both chambers.

The 1951 election was the first double dissolution election since single transferable vote with proportional representation became the method for electing the Senate in 1949. With close opinion polls and no minor parties having a credible chance of winning a seat, it was feared and forecast that under the new system the Senate would finish deadlocked at 30–30, since the 54.55% majority that either major party required to win a sixth Senate seat from any single state was greater than polling margins, and there were proposals for further amendments to Senate voting rules ahead of the election, none of which were passed. In the end, Queensland and Western Australia elected 6–4 Senator majorities to the Coalition; the other states were tied 5–5.

== Results ==
=== House of Representatives ===
Labor: 52 seats Liberal: 52 seats Country: 17 seats

House of Reps (IRV) — 1951–54—Turnout 96.00% (CV) — Informal 1.90%
Party	First preference votes	%	Swing	Seats	Change
Liberal–Country coalition	2,298,512	50.34	+0.08	69	–5
Liberal	1,854,799	40.62	+1.23	52	–3
Country	443,713	9.72	–1.15	17	–2
Labor	2,174,840	47.63	+1.65	54 (Note: Including Northern Territory and Australian Capital Territory)	+6
Communist	44,782	0.98	+0.09	0	0
Independents	47,765	1.05	–1.11	0	–1
Total	4,565,899			123	
Two-party-preferred (estimated)
Liberal–Country coalition	Win	50.70	−0.30	69	−5
Labor		49.30	+0.30	52	+5

Notes

- Three members were elected unopposed – two Labor and one Liberal.

First preference vote
Labor	47.63%
Liberal	40.62%
Country	9.72%
Independent	1.05%
Communist	0.98%

Two-party-preferred vote
Coalition	50.70%
Labor	49.30%

Parliament seats
Coalition	57.02%
Labor	42.98%

=== Senate ===
Senate (STV) — 1951–53—Turnout 95.99% (CV) — Informal 7.13%
Party	First preference votes	%	Swing	Seats won	Seats held	Change
Liberal–Country coalition	2,198,687	49.70	–0.71	32	32	+6
Liberal–Country joint ticket	1,925,631	43.52	–1.12	22	N/A	N/A
Liberal	273,056	6.17	+0.41	10	26	+5
Country	N/A	N/A	N/A	N/A	6	+1
Labor	2,029,751	45.88	+0.99	28	28	−6
Communist	93,561	2.11	+0.02	0	0	0
Lang Labor	60,549	1.37	+1.37	0	0	0
Protestant People's	13,090	0.30	–0.59	0	0	0
Henry George Justice	6,015	0.14	+0.14	0	0	0
Independents	22,584	0.51	–1.20	0	0	0
Total	4,424,237			60	60	

== Seats changing hands ==
Seat	Pre-1951			Swing	Post-1951		
Seat	Party	Member	Margin	Swing	Margin	Member	Party
Australian Capital Territory, ACT	Independent	Lewis Nott	3.8	6.7	2.9	Jim Fraser	Labor
Ballaarat, Vic	Liberal	Alan Pittard	0.4	1.6	1.2	Bob Joshua	Labor
Hume, NSW	Country	Charles Anderson	1.0	1.3	0.3	Arthur Fuller	Labor
Kingston, SA	Liberal	Jim Handby	1.6	3.4	1.8	Pat Galvin	Labor
Leichhardt, Qld	Country	Tom Gilmore	1.0	1.3	0.3	Harry Bruce	Labor
Wannon, Vic	Liberal	Dan Mackinnon	0.8	1.9	1.1	Don McLeod	Labor

== Opinion polling ==
=== Graphical summary ===
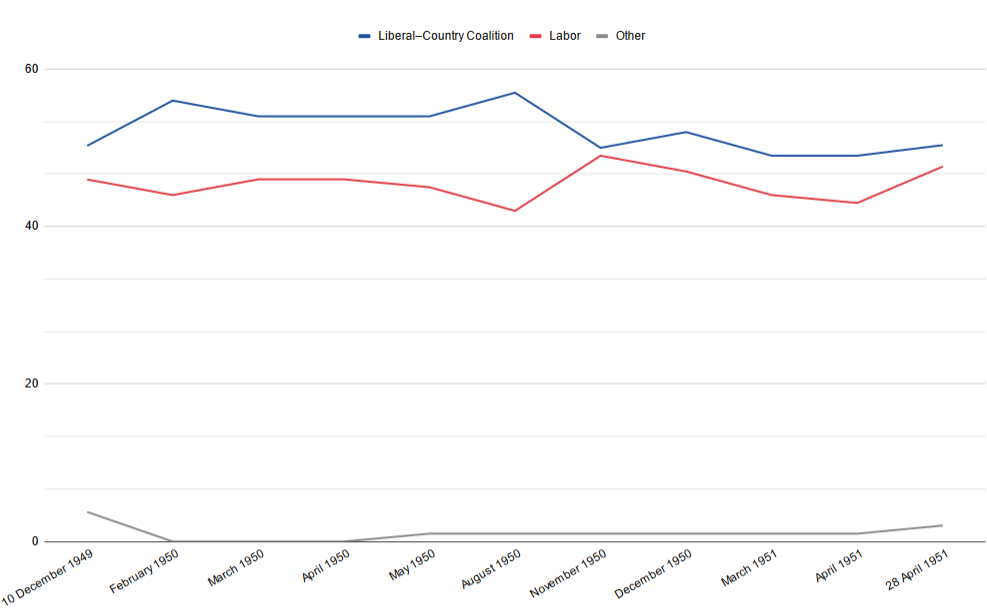
Australian opinion polling for the election Liberal–Country Coalition Labor Other

=== Voting intention ===
Date	Firm	First preference vote		
Date	Firm	L/CP	ALP	OTH
28 Apr 1951	1951 election	50.3%	47.6%	2.0%
Apr 1951	Gallup	49%	43%	1%
Mar 1951	Gallup	49%	44%	1%
Dec 1950	Gallup	52%	47%	1%
Nov 1950	Gallup	50%	49%	1%
Aug 1950	Gallup	57%	42%	1%
5 May 1950	Gallup	54%	46%	1%
Apr 1950	Gallup	54%	46%	—N/a
24 Mar 1950	Gallup	54%	46%	—N/a
Feb 1950	Gallup	56%	44%	—N/a
10 Dec 1949	1949 election	50.3%	46.0%	3.8%

== See also ==
- Candidates of the 1951 Australian federal election
- Members of the Australian House of Representatives, 1951–1954
- Members of the Australian Senate, 1951–1953
