= Jim Fraser (politician) =

Australian politician and journalist

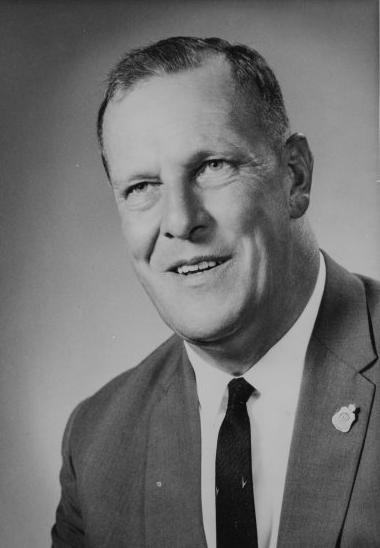

Member of the Australian Parliament for Australian Capital Territory
- In office 28 April 1951 – 1 April 1970
- Preceded by: Lewis Nott
- Succeeded by: Kep Enderby

Personal details
- Born: 8 February 1908 Derby, Tasmania, Australia
- Died: 1 April 1970 (aged 62) Canberra, Australia
- Party: Australian Labor Party
- Spouse: Helen Whitten Rowland
- Occupation: Teacher, journalist

James Reay Fraser (8 February 1908 – 1 April 1970) was a Member of the Australian House of Representatives for the Australian Capital Territory from 1951 to 1970.

Fraser was born in Derby, Tasmania and educated at Launceston High School. He worked as a chainman and axeman and as a teacher in Victorian state schools from 1927 to 1935. He then worked as a journalist until he enlisted in the Second Australian Imperial Force in 1942 and served in New Guinea until 1945. From 1946 to 1948 he worked as a journalist in the Department of Information in Canberra and then as press secretary and private secretary to Senator Nick McKenna until 1951.

== Political career ==
Fraser became a member of the Australian Capital Territory Advisory Council in 1949 and defeated Lewis Nott for the House of Representatives seat of the Australian Capital Territory in the 1951 election. He did not have full voting rights until 1966; until then he could only vote on matters relating to the territory. He put in time and energy looking after the interests of his constituents. In 1959, he married Helen Whitten Rowland. He died of cancer in 1970, survived by his only son Andrew; his wife died in March 2012.

His brother, Allan Fraser, was MP for the adjoining seat of Eden-Monaro from 1943 to 1966 and from 1969 to 1972.

The Division of Fraser and the suburb of Fraser, Australian Capital Territory, both in Canberra, were named after Jim. The name of the Division of Fraser was changed in 2016 to Fenner, as a division in Victoria has been named after prime minister Malcolm Fraser (1975–83) from 2019.

== Notes ==
Parliament of Australia
Preceded by Lewis Nott	Member for Australian Capital Territory; 1951–1970	Succeeded by Kep Enderby
