= National Capital Authority =

Australian government agency

Statutory authority overview
- Formed: 1921; 105 years ago
- Jurisdiction: Australian Government
- Headquarters: Treasury Building, King Edward Terrace Parkes, Australia
- Website: nca.gov.au

The National Capital Authority (NCA) is a statutory authority of the Australian Government that was established to manage the Commonwealth's interest in the planning and development of Canberra as the capital city of Australia.

Timeline of the NCA and preceding bodies:

- 1921–1924: Federal Capital Advisory Committee (FCAC)
- 1925–1930: Federal Capital Commission (FCC)
- 1930–1938: No body in existence
- 1938–1957: National Capital Planning and Development Committee (NCPDC)
- 1958–1989: National Capital Development Commission (NCDC)
- 1989–present: National Capital Authority (NCA)

== 1921–1924: Federal Capital Advisory Committee (FCAC) ==
The FCAC oversaw the construction of Canberra from 1921 to 1924 following the termination of the contract of architect Walter Burley Griffin.

The committee was chaired by Australian architect Sir John Sulman, and advised the Minister of Home Affairs on the Construction of Canberra and conducted a review of the Griffin Plan. The Committee proposed that development should take place in three stages:

- Stage one, which was to take three years, would see the transfer of Parliament and key administrative staff moved from Melbourne to Canberra.
- Stage two, also to take three years, would include the construction of railways in addition to other key buildings
- Stage three would create character and permanence in the capital.

The committee was largely unsuccessful in achieving its aims, for example Parliament did not move to Canberra until 1927, and no permanent rail connection between Sydney, Canberra and Melbourne was ever completed. However Sulman was instrumental in developing the garden city aspects of Canberra, he declared that the development of Canberra should take the form of 'a garden town, with simple, pleasing, but unpretentious buildings'.

In 1924 the committee was abolished due to the slow pace of development, it was replaced by the more successful Federal Capital Commission in 1925.

== 1925–1930: Federal Capital Commission (FCC) ==
The FCC was formed to construct and administer Canberra from 1 January 1925. The Chief Commissioner of the body was Sir John Butters. The FCC was to prepare Canberra for the arrival of 1,100 civil servants and their families.

During the first two years of FCC operation Parliament House, The Lodge, the Albert Hall, the Institute of Anatomy, the Australian School of Forestry and an observatory on Mount Stromlo were completed. The FCC also oversaw construction of the Sydney and Melbourne commercial buildings in the City and significant residential development.

The FCC was disbanded on 1 May 1930 following the start of the Great Depression in 1929. Development after this point was not centrally planned until the establishment of the National Capital Planning and Development Committee in 1938.

=== Federal Capital Architectural Style ===
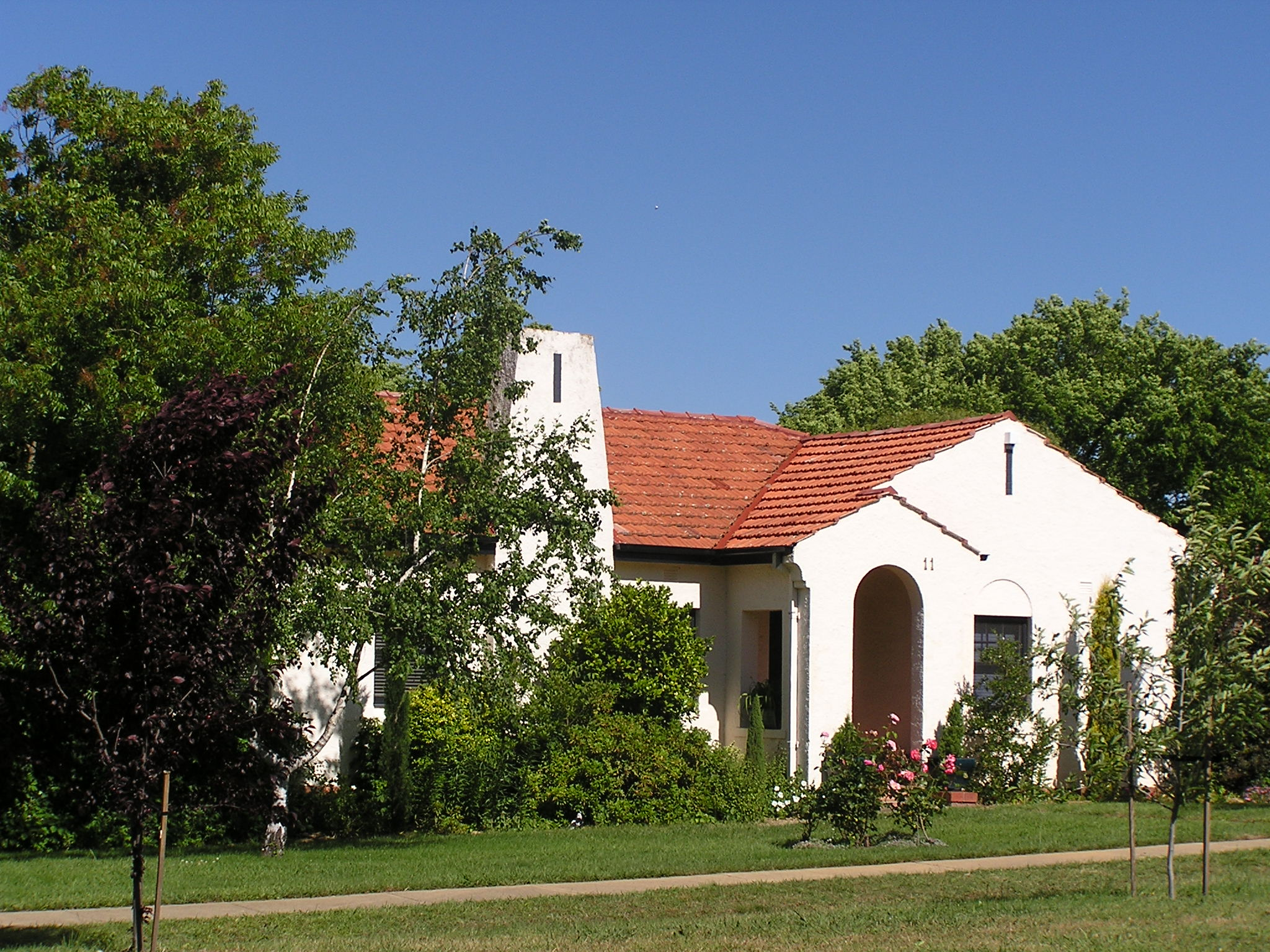
House in Griffith built by the Commission in the 1920s

Federal Capital Commission architects designed houses in the new city and public buildings using a mixture of elements from the Arts and Crafts movement, Mediterranean and Georgian styles. The result is known as the FCC style and is unique to Canberra. FCC style houses can be found in the suburbs of Barton, Braddon, Forrest and Reid.

Sir John Sulman began the development of Federal Capital Architecture. Before emigrating to Australia in 1885, he had been a friend of William Morris and active in the Arts and Crafts movement. Other than Sulman's leadership, the influences on the architects employed by the Federal Capital Authority and Commission were reflecting the thinking after the peak of the nationalistic Australian Federation style and looking to America for inspiration and seeking to practically respond to the Australian climate.

By the time Canberra was being built, the popularity of the uniquely Australian Federation style architecture was waning. The architect William Hardy Wilson led the reaction against the ornateness of the Federation style and advocated adopting approaches from the United States. When Leslie Wilkinson arrived in Australia in 1918 to take up his position as the first Professor of Architecture at an Australian university, he reinforced Wilson's view and advocated building appropriately for the climate, suggesting the Spanish Mission style of architecture in California and Mexico as being an appropriate style for Australia. When Walter Burley Griffin arrived in 1913, there was interest in the Prairie Style of mid-western America with which Griffin was associated. The Classical revival style was popular in America, reflected in Beaux-Arts architecture. There was also interest in Classicism by English architects, including Edwin Lutyens, who was responsible for many of the public buildings in New Delhi built from 1912 to 1929 in the wake of the decision to replace Calcutta as the seat of the British Indian government.

==== Examples of FCC style ====
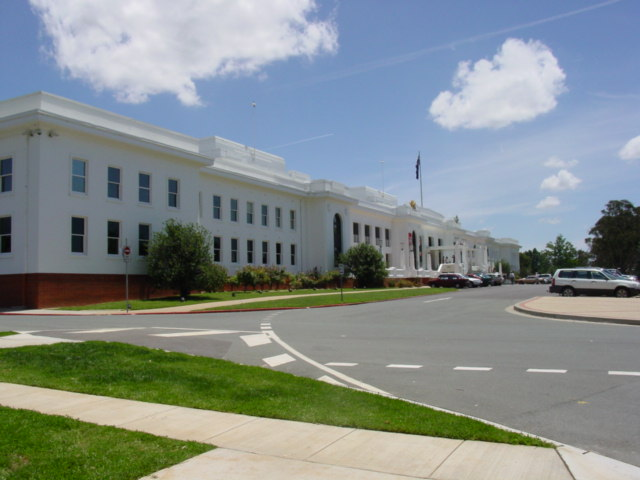
Provisional Parliament House

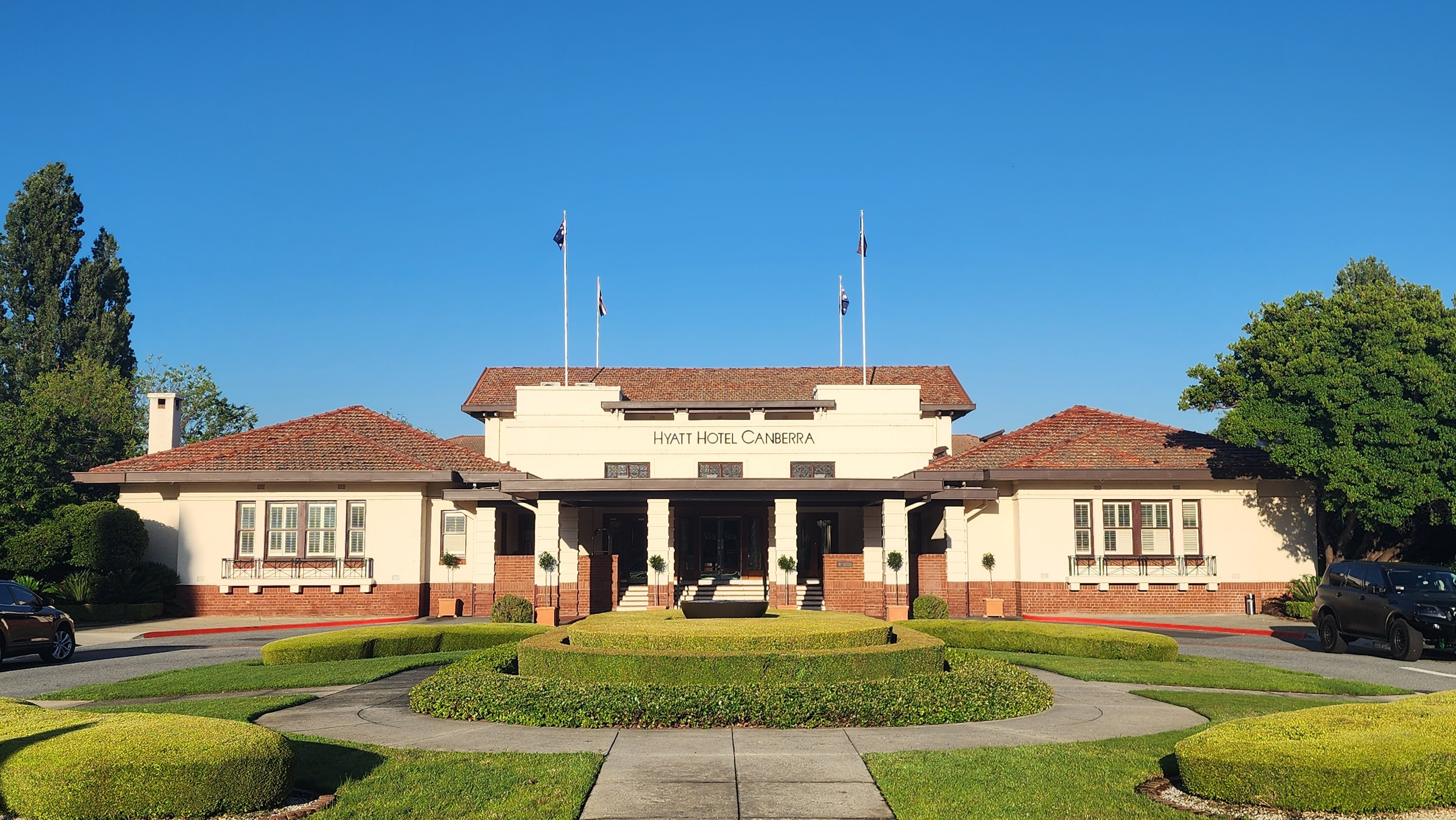
Hotel Canberra

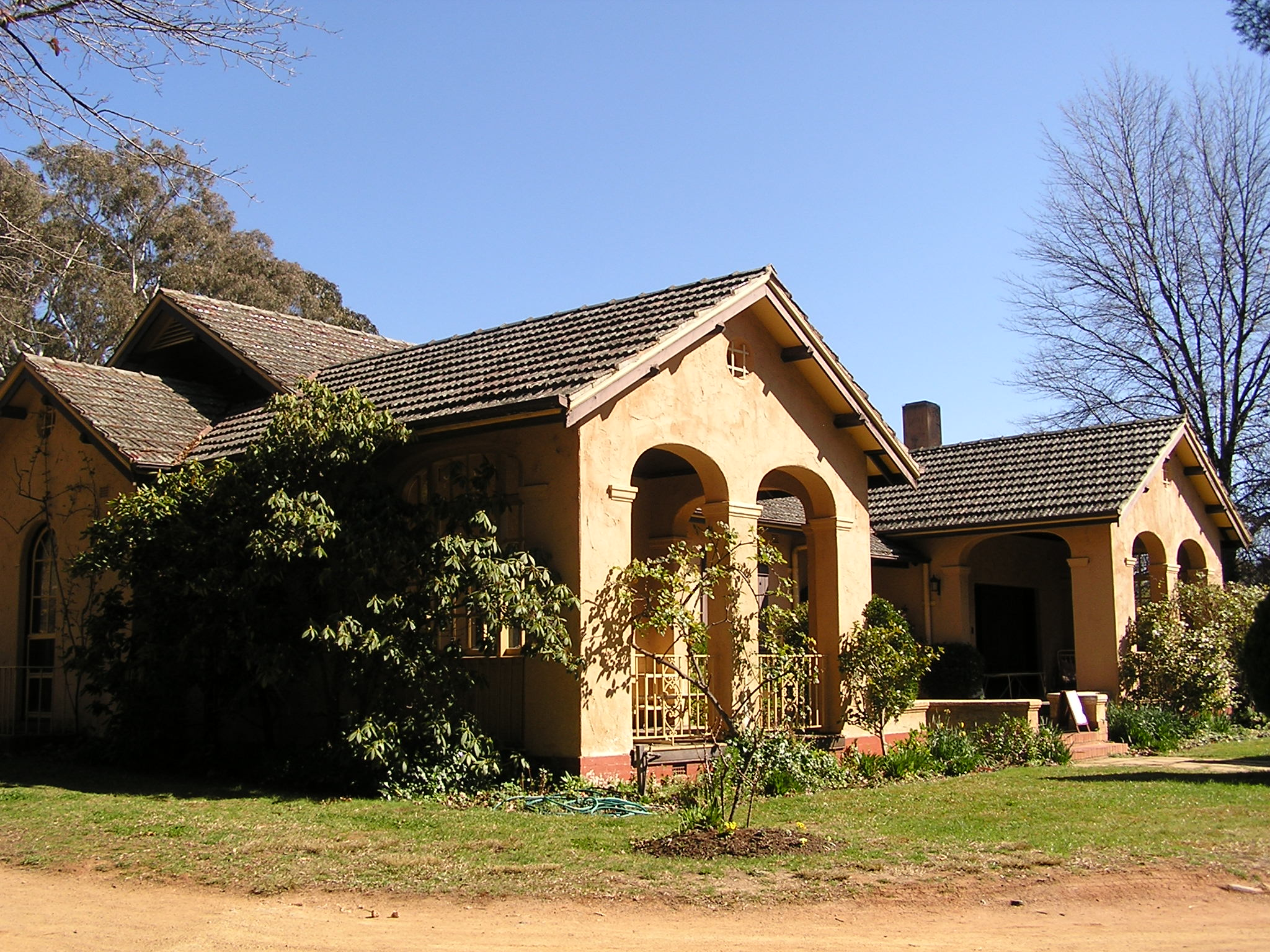
Calthorpes' House

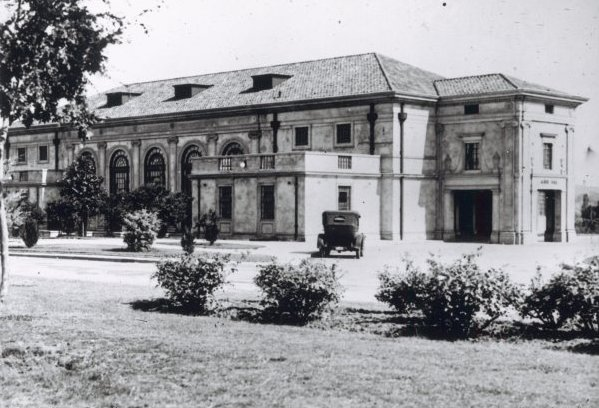
Albert Hall

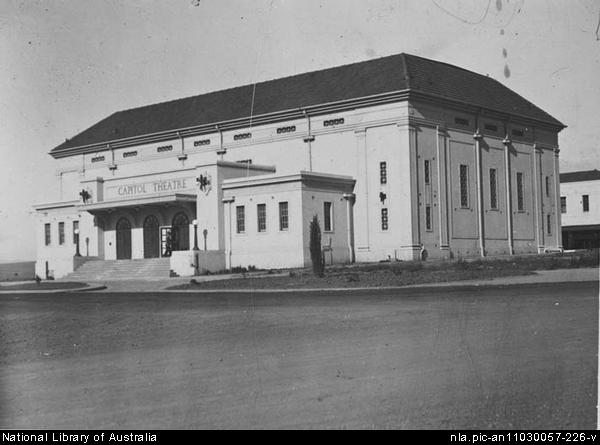
Capitol Theatre, Manuka

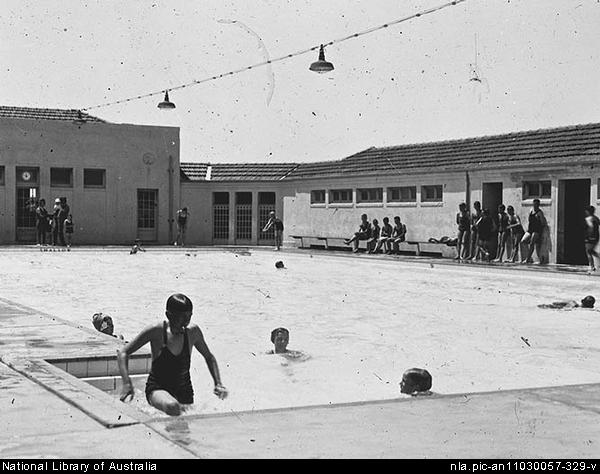
Manuka Pool

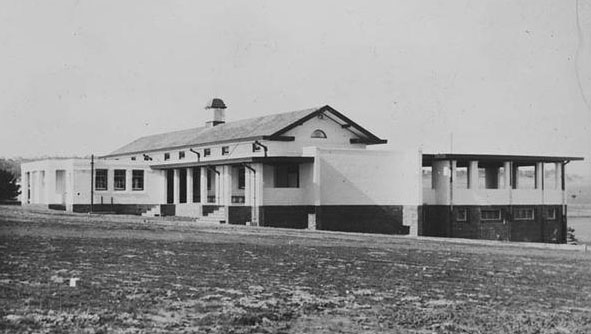
Telopea Park school

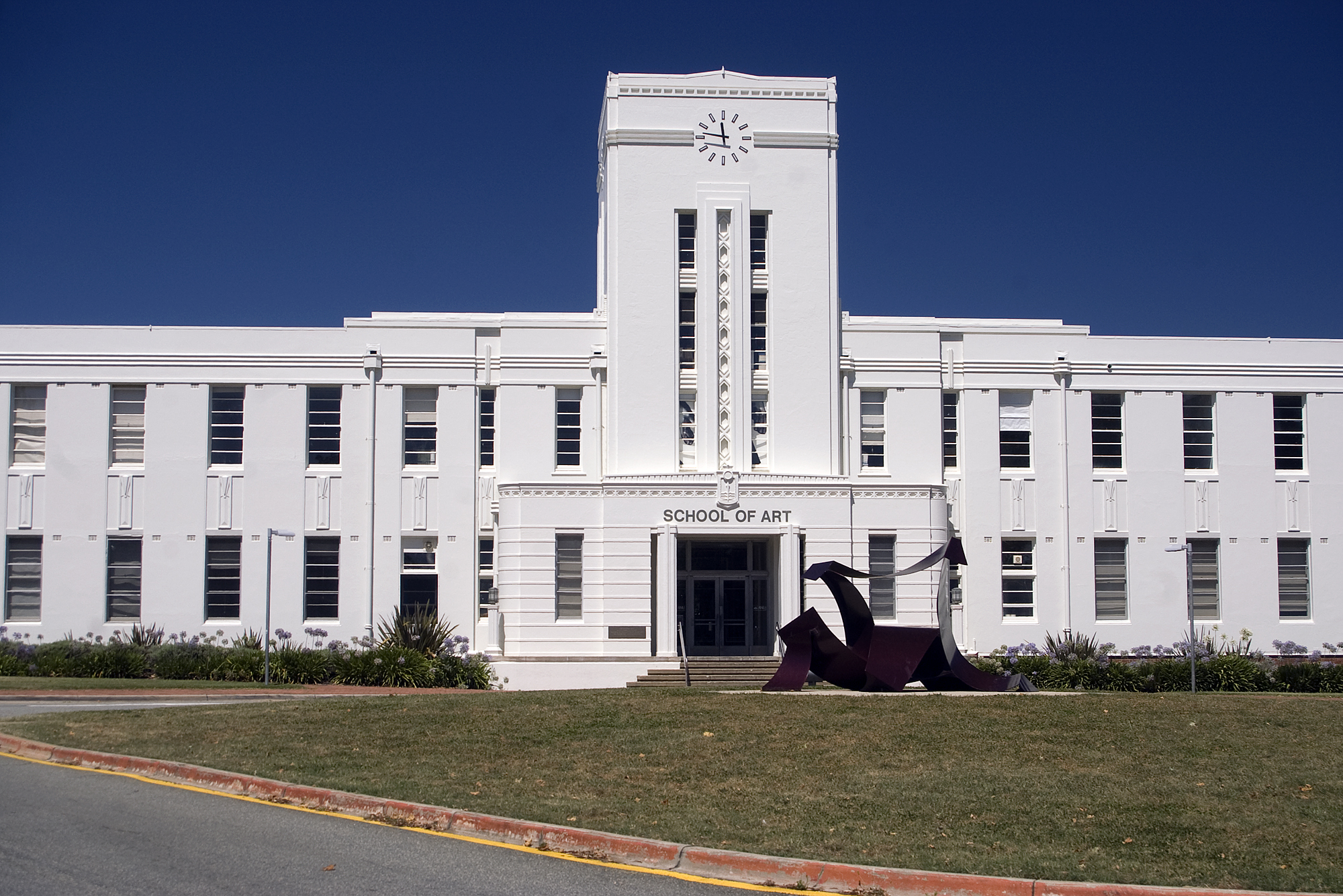
Former Canberra High School (now the ANU School of Art)

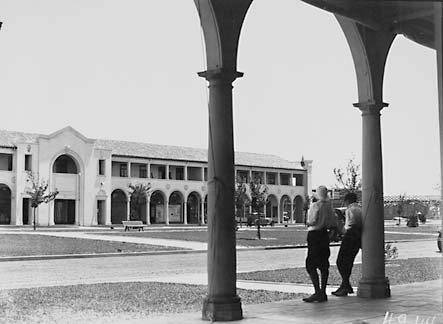
Sydney and Melbourne buildings, Civic

== 1938–1957: National Capital Planning and Development Committee (NCPDC) ==
The NCPDC was formed in 1938 to oversee the development of Canberra. The NCPDC was to advise the Minister of the Interior to safeguard the Griffin plan and maintain high aesthetic and architectural standards worthy of a national capital. The committee had no executive power, and was unable to direct development of the capital.

Dissatisfied with progress, the government established a Senate select committee in 1954 to inquire into Canberra's development. In 1958 it was replaced by the well-funded and authoritative National Capital Development Commission.

== 1958–1989: National Capital Development Commission (NCDC) ==
The NCDC was created to complete the establishment of Canberra as the seat of government. It was created in 1957 through the National Capital Development Commission Act 1957.

Under the control of the NCDC Canberra grew from a population of 40,000 to 300,000. The NCDC was responsible for the development of Canberra's satellite cities; Woden Valley, Belconnen, Tuggeranong and Gungahlin. The NCDC also oversaw construction of Lake Burley Griffin and New Parliament House.

The NCDC had four Commissioners:

- Sir John Overall, Commissioner, 1958–1972
- W.C. Andrews, Commissioner, 1972–1974
- Tony Powell, Commissioner, 1974–1985
- Malcolm Latham, Commissioner, 1985–1989

The NCDC was advised by the National Capital Planning Committee which was chaired by the NCDC Commissioner and composed of six nominated representatives of the Royal Australian Institute of Architects, the Institution of Engineers, Australia and the Royal Australian Planning Institute plus two other members with special knowledge and experience in cultural matters.

In 1965 the NCDC commissioned Alan M. Voorhees and Associates (consultants from the United States) to undertake a study of urban form and transportation in Canberra. This was known as the Voorhees study. In August 1968, NCDC chief planner Peter Harrison first made the existence of the Y plan public in Architecture in Australia.

Norman Russell Symons was the Transport Planning Engineer of the National Capital Development Commission from 1972-1975 with responsibility for all transport planning for Tuggeranong.

In 1974 the National Capital Development Commission announced a shift in transport planning, designed to prioritise intertown public transport and only build sufficient road capacity for off-peak private vehicle volumes - a radical policy at the time. By the 1980s, the NCDC "buried the new transport policy approach" that ACTION sought to implement. The NCDC suppressed the 'Short Term Transport Study' report. It was never published, and never publicly mentioned. All copies vanished from the Commission's library and its archives. A copy was later found by Paul Mees in the Melbourne University Architecture Library.

The NCDC was abolished after the Australian Capital Territory (Self-Government) Act 1988, and most of its functions passed to the new ACT government and the National Capital Authority.

== 1989–present: National Capital Authority (NCA) ==
The National Capital Authority was established in 1989 when the Australian Capital Territory was granted self-government. The authority consists of a chairperson and four other members, all members are appointed on the advice of the Australian Government. Under the Australian Capital Territory (Planning and Land Management) Act 1988 (Cth), the NCA has the authority to prepare and administer a National Capital Plan.
