= Division of Australian Capital Territory =

Former Australian federal electoral division

Coordinates: 35.2822°S 149.1287°E

Australian Capital Territory Australian House of Representatives Division
- Map of the Australian Capital Territory
- Created: 1949
- Abolished: 1974
- MP: Lewis Nott (1949-1951); Jim Fraser (1951-1970); Kep Enderby (1970-1974)
- Party: Independent (1949-1951); Labor (1951-1974)
- Namesake: Australian Capital Territory
- Demographic: Metropolitan and rural

The Division of Australian Capital Territory was an Australian electoral division in the Territory of the same name. The division was created in 1949 to cover the entire Territory, including the whole of the city of Canberra and its surrounding rural areas.

Prior to 1949, the Australian Capital Territory (ACT) had no representation in the Australian Parliament. The ACT's first member was elected at the 1949 federal election. However, until 1966 he could only vote on matters relating to the ACT and did not count for the purposes of forming government. In 1966, full voting rights were granted. For most of its history, it was a fairly safe seat for the Australian Labor Party.

In 1974, the division was divided into two new divisions, Canberra and Fraser. The last member for the united division, Kep Enderby, transferred to Canberra.

== Members ==
Image	Member	Party	Term	Notes
	Lewis Nott (1886–1951)	Independent	10 December 1949 – 28 April 1951	Previously held the Division of Herbert. Lost seat
	Jim Fraser (1908–1970)	Labor	28 April 1951 – 1 April 1970	Died in office
	Kep Enderby (1926–2015)	Labor	30 May 1970 – 18 May 1974	Served as minister under Whitlam. Transferred to the Division of Canberra after Australian Capital Territory was abolished in 1974
