= Australian Capital Territory Advisory Council =

Type
- Type: Advisory body

History
- Founded: 1 May 1930
- Disbanded: 1 October 1974
- Preceded by: Federal Capital Commission
- Succeeded by: Australian Capital Territory House of Assembly
- Seats: 3 (1930–1952); 5 (1952–1974); 6 (1957–1959); 8 (1959–1974)

The Australian Capital Territory Advisory Council was an elected body that operated from 1930 until 1974, when it was replaced by the Australian Capital Territory House of Assembly.

The Council originally consisted of three elected members, being increased to five in 1952, to six in 1957 and to eight in 1959. It replaced the Federal Capital Commission and initially included members appointed by the Departments of Works and Railways, Home Affairs, Health and Attorney-General.

== See also ==
- Members of the Australian Capital Territory Advisory Council
