= 1951 Australian House of Representatives election =

This is a list of electoral division results for the Australian 1951 federal election.

== Overall ==
This section is an excerpt from 1951 Australian federal election § House of Representatives

Labor: 52 seats Liberal: 52 seats Country: 17 seats

House of Reps (IRV) — 1951–54—Turnout 96.00% (CV) — Informal 1.90%
Party	Votes	%	Swing	Seats	Change
Liberal–Country coalition	2,298,512	50.34	+0.08	69	–5
Liberal	1,854,799	40.62	+1.23	52	–3
Country	443,713	9.72	–1.15	17	–2
Labor	2,174,840	47.63	+1.65	54 (Note: Including Northern Territory and Australian Capital Territory)	+6
Communist	44,782	0.98	+0.09	0	0
Independents	47,765	1.05	–1.11	0	–1
Total	4,565,899			123	
Two-party-preferred (estimated)
Liberal–Country coalition	Win	50.70	−0.30	69	−5
Labor		49.30	+0.30	52	+5

Notes

- Three members were elected unopposed – two Labor and one Liberal.

Popular vote
Labor	47.63%
Liberal	40.62%
Country	9.72%
Independent	1.05%
Communist	0.98%

Two-party-preferred vote
Coalition	50.70%
Labor	49.30%

Parliament seats
Coalition	57.02%
Labor	42.98%

== New South Wales ==
1951 Australian federal election (New South Wales)
← 1949	28 April 1951	1954 →

All 47 NSW seats in the House of Representatives 24 seats needed for a majority
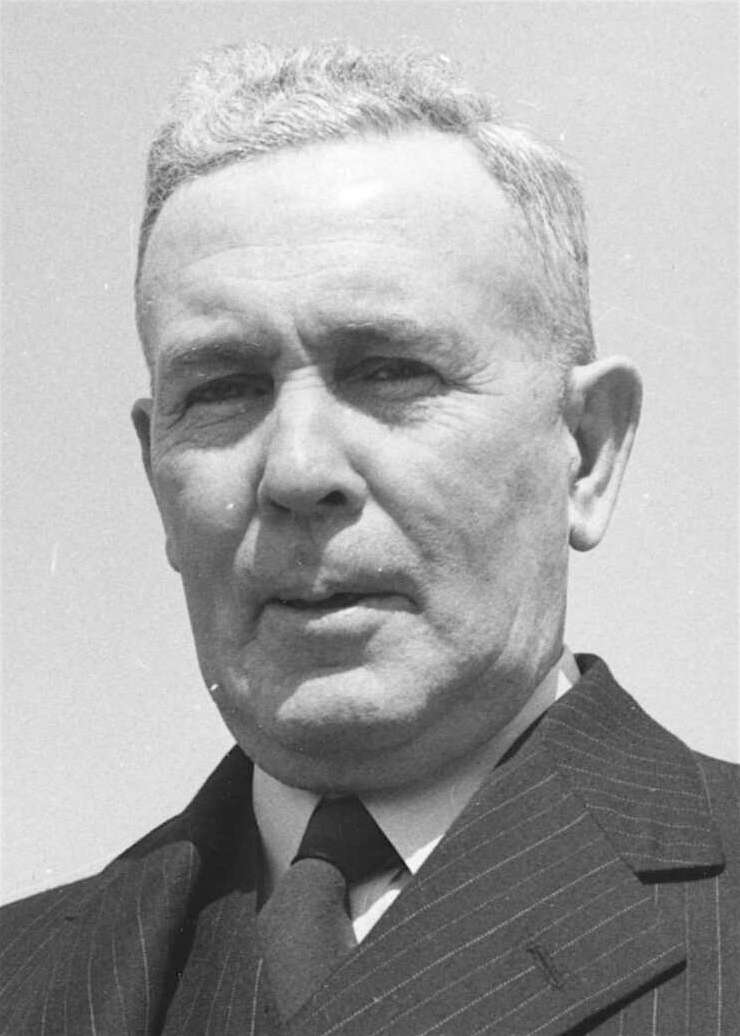

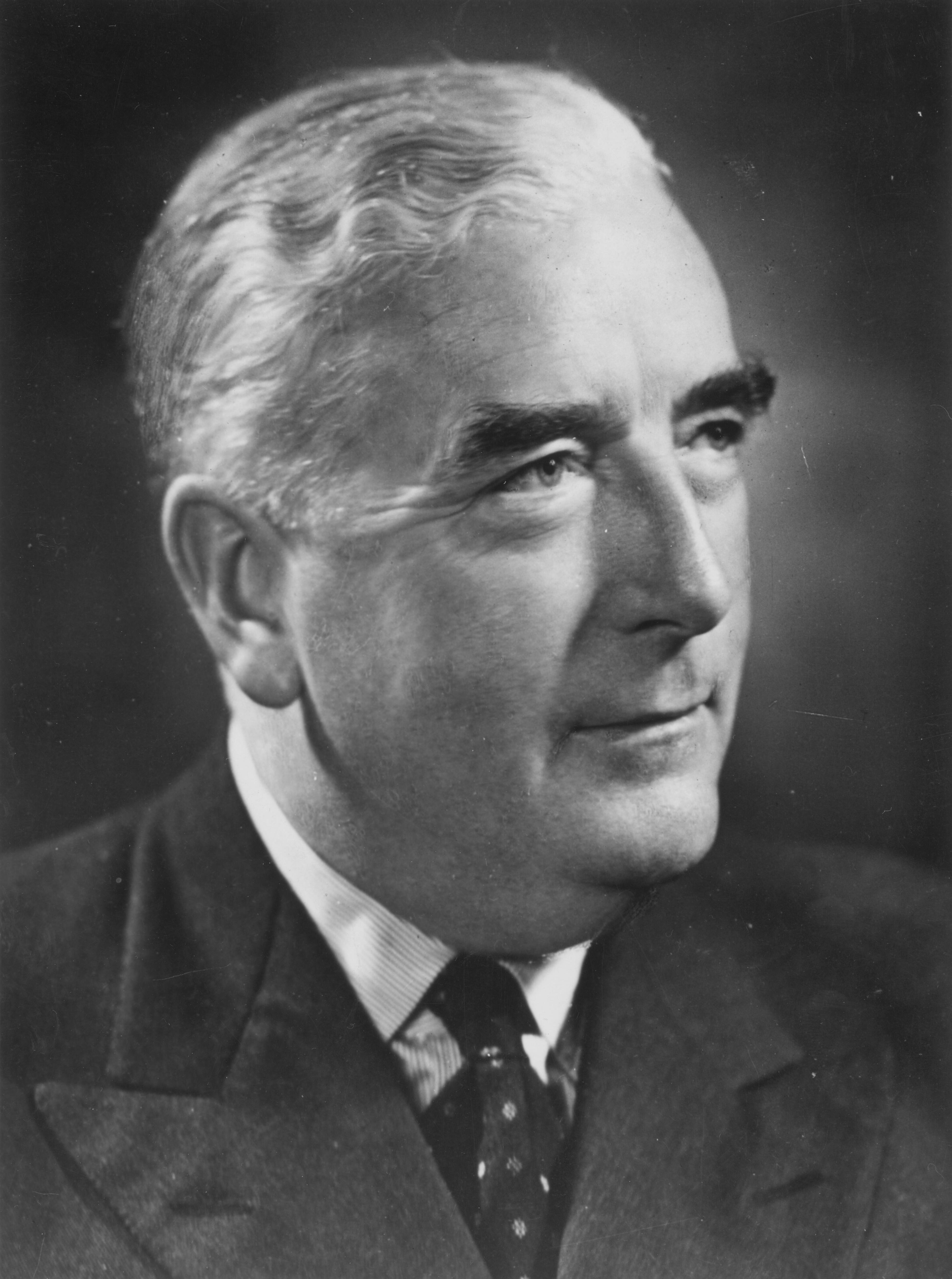
	First party	Second party
Leader	Ben Chifley	Robert Menzies
Party	Labor	Coalition
Seats before	23	24
Seats won	24	23
Seat change	▲1	▼1
Popular vote	898,883	898,131
Percentage	49.2%	49.1%
Swing	▲2.8pp	▲0.7pp
TPP	50.5%	49.5%
TPP swing	▼0.3pp	▲0.3pp

=== Banks ===
This section is an excerpt from Electoral results for the Division of Banks § 1951

1951 Australian federal election: Banks
Party	Candidate	Votes	%	±%
Labor	Eric Costa	28,219	61.7	+3.4
Liberal	George Roffey	17,536	38.3	+1.8
Total formal votes		45,755	97.6	
Informal votes		1,143	2.4	
Turnout		46,898	95.8	
Labor hold		Swing	−0.5	

=== Barton ===
This section is an excerpt from Electoral results for the Division of Barton § 1951

1951 Australian federal election: Barton
Party	Candidate	Votes	%	±%
Labor	Herbert Evatt	20,949	50.3	−2.9
Liberal	Nancy Wake	20,706	49.7	+2.9
Total formal votes		41,655	98.6	
Informal votes		580	1.4	
Turnout		42,235	97.4	
Labor hold		Swing	−2.9	

=== Bennelong ===
This section is an excerpt from Electoral results for the Division of Bennelong § 1951

1951 Australian federal election: Bennelong
Party	Candidate	Votes	%	±%
Liberal	John Cramer	24,732	61.0	+1.4
Labor	William Fitzgibbon	15,840	39.0	−1.4
Total formal votes		40,572	98.1	
Informal votes		797	1.9	
Turnout		41,369	96.3	
Liberal hold		Swing	+1.4	

=== Blaxland ===
This section is an excerpt from Electoral results for the Division of Blaxland § 1951

1951 Australian federal election: Blaxland
Party	Candidate	Votes	%	±%
Labor	Jim Harrison	25,749	63.9	+14.6
Liberal	Jim Dennison	14,547	36.1	+12.3
Total formal votes		40,296	97.5	
Informal votes		1,039	2.5	
Turnout		41,335	94.9	
Labor hold		Swing	+10.5	

=== Bradfield ===
This section is an excerpt from Electoral results for the Division of Bradfield § 1951

1951 Australian federal election: Bradfield
Party	Candidate	Votes	%	±%
Liberal	Billy Hughes	32,469	78.7	+7.3
Labor	Hugh Milne	8,784	21.3	−0.4
Total formal votes		41,253	98.2	
Informal votes		762	1.8	
Turnout		42,015	95.8	
Liberal hold		Swing	+3.8	

=== Calare ===
This section is an excerpt from Electoral results for the Division of Calare § 1951

1951 Australian federal election: Calare
Party	Candidate	Votes	%	±%
Liberal	John Howse	20,517	54.4	−2.9
Labor	John Howell	15,141	40.1	−2.9
Independent	Archibald Gardiner	2,067	5.5	+5.5
Total formal votes		37,725	98.7	
Informal votes		497	1.3	
Turnout		38,204	96.5	
Two-party-preferred result
Liberal	John Howse		56.2	−0.8
Labor	John Howell		43.8	+0.8
Liberal hold		Swing	−0.8	

=== Cook ===
This section is an excerpt from Electoral results for the Division of Cook (1906–1955) § 1951

1951 Australian federal election: Cook
Party	Candidate	Votes	%	±%
Labor	Tom Sheehan	27,637	78.1	+3.1
Liberal	Roy Hatfield	4,790	13.5	−2.8
Communist	Harry Hatfield	2,976	8.4	+4.9
Total formal votes		35,403	97.3	
Informal votes		965	2.7	
Turnout		36,368	94.4	
Two-party-preferred result
Labor	Tom Sheehan		85.7	+3.6
Liberal	Roy Hatfield		34.3	−3.6
Labor hold		Swing	+3.6	

=== Cowper ===
This section is an excerpt from Electoral results for the Division of Cowper § 1951

1951 Australian federal election: Cowper
Party	Candidate	Votes	%	±%
Country	Sir Earle Page	22,632	61.0	−0.7
Labor	William Bailey	13,743	37.0	−1.3
Independent	William Tomlinson	724	2.0	+2.0
Total formal votes		37,099	98.9	
Informal votes		425	1.1	
Turnout		37,524	96.7	
Two-party-preferred result
Country	Sir Earle Page		62.0	+0.3
Labor	William Bailey		38.0	−0.3
Country hold		Swing	+0.3	

=== Cunningham ===
This section is an excerpt from Electoral results for the Division of Cunningham § 1951

1951 Australian federal election: Cunningham
Party	Candidate	Votes	%	±%
Labor	Billy Davies	24,433	61.7	+1.0
Liberal	Alan Thomson	12,674	32.0	+0.3
Communist	Eric Aarons	2,466	6.2	−1.4
Total formal votes		39,573	98.3	
Informal votes		691	1.7	
Turnout		40,264	96.1	
Two-party-preferred result
Labor	Billy Davies		67.7	−0.5
Liberal	Alan Thomson		32.3	+0.5
Labor hold		Swing	−0.5	

=== Dalley ===
This section is an excerpt from Electoral results for the Division of Dalley § 1951

1951 Australian federal election: Dalley
Party	Candidate	Votes	%	±%
Labor	Sol Rosevear	24,851	67.1	−5.9
Liberal	John Laffin	12,204	32.9	+5.9
Total formal votes		37,055	97.7	
Informal votes		877	2.3	
Turnout		37,932	96.0	
Labor hold		Swing	−5.9	

=== Darling ===
This section is an excerpt from Electoral results for the Division of Darling § 1951

1951 Australian federal election: Darling
Party	Candidate	Votes	%	±%
Labor	Joe Clark	22,610	68.8	+5.0
Country	Elson Whyte	10,253	31.2	−0.5
Total formal votes		32,863	97.4	
Informal votes		864	2.6	
Turnout		33,727	94.5	
Labor hold		Swing	+1.5	

=== East Sydney ===
This section is an excerpt from Electoral results for the Division of East Sydney § 1951

1951 Australian federal election: East Sydney
Party	Candidate	Votes	%	±%
Labor	Eddie Ward	20,379	54.9	−2.1
Liberal	Allan Stewart	16,767	45.1	+6.1
Total formal votes		37,146	97.5	
Informal votes		961	2.5	
Turnout		38,107	94.2	
Labor hold		Swing	−3.1	

=== Eden-Monaro ===
This section is an excerpt from Electoral results for the Division of Eden-Monaro § 1951

1951 Australian federal election: Eden-Monaro
Party	Candidate	Votes	%	±%
Labor	Allan Fraser	19,574	51.0	+0.1
Liberal	Bill Keys	18,832	49.0	−0.1
Total formal votes		38,406	98.9	
Informal votes		419	1.1	
Turnout		38,825	96.7	
Labor hold		Swing	+0.1	

=== Evans ===
This section is an excerpt from Electoral results for the Division of Evans § 1951

1951 Australian federal election: Evans
Party	Candidate	Votes	%	±%
Liberal	Frederick Osborne	21,936	58.6	+2.0
Labor	Robert Bailey	15,467	41.4	−2.0
Total formal votes		37,403	98.3	
Informal votes		666	1.7	
Turnout		38,069	96.3	
Liberal hold		Swing	+2.0	

=== Farrer ===
This section is an excerpt from Electoral results for the Division of Farrer § 1951

1951 Australian federal election: Farrer
Party	Candidate	Votes	%	±%
Liberal	David Fairbairn	21,678	56.4	+18.2
Labor	Daniel Byrnes	26,744	43.6	+4.3
Total formal votes		38,422	98.5	
Informal votes		570	1.5	
Turnout		38,992	96.5	
Liberal hold		Swing	−2.4	

=== Grayndler ===
This section is an excerpt from Electoral results for the Division of Grayndler § 1951

1951 Australian federal election: Grayndler
Party	Candidate	Votes	%	±%
Labor	Fred Daly	23,038	74.9	+7.8
Liberal	Roy Squire	8,398	22.4	−7.2
Republican	William McCristal	977	2.6	+1.7
Total formal votes		37,413	97.7	
Informal votes		869	2.3	
Turnout		38,282	96.1	
Two-party-preferred result
Labor	Fred Daly		76.2	+6.5
Liberal	Roy Squire		23.8	−6.5
Labor hold		Swing	+6.5	

=== Gwydir ===
This section is an excerpt from Electoral results for the Division of Gwydir § 1951

1951 Australian federal election: Gwydir
Party	Candidate	Votes	%	±%
Country	Thomas Treloar	19,460	53.2	−1.9
Labor	Norman Ferguson	17,147	46.8	+1.9
Total formal votes		36,607	98.9	
Informal votes		408	1.1	
Turnout		37,015	95.5	
Country hold		Swing	−1.9	

=== Hume ===
This section is an excerpt from Electoral results for the Division of Hume § 1951

1951 Australian federal election: Hume
Party	Candidate	Votes	%	±%
Labor	Arthur Fuller	18,849	50.3	+1.3
Country	Charles Anderson	18,622	49.7	−1.3
Total formal votes		37,471	99.0	
Informal votes		374	1.0	
Turnout		37,845	96.2	
Labor gain from Country		Swing	+1.3	

=== Hunter ===
This section is an excerpt from Electoral results for the Division of Hunter § 1951

1951 Australian federal election: Hunter
Party	Candidate	Votes	%	±%
Labor	Rowley James	28,595	70.8	+2.2
Liberal	Ted Fletcher	6,810	16.9	−4.9
Communist	Evan Phillips	2,927	7.2	−2.4
Independent	Arthur English	2,075	5.1	+5.1
Total formal votes		40,407	97.6	
Informal votes		1,007	2.4	
Turnout		41,414	97.1	
Two-party-preferred result
Labor	Rowley James		78.9	+1.6
Liberal	Ted Fletcher		21.1	−1.6
Labor hold		Swing	+1.6	

=== Kingsford Smith ===
This section is an excerpt from Electoral results for the Division of Kingsford Smith § 1951

1951 Australian federal election: Kingsford-Smith
Party	Candidate	Votes	%	±%
Labor	Gordon Anderson	18,110	50.5	+0.8
Liberal	Arthur Butterell	17,784	49.5	+3.0
Total formal votes		35,894	98.0	
Informal votes		740	2.0	
Turnout		36,634	95.3	
Labor hold		Swing	−0.4	

=== Lang ===
This section is an excerpt from Electoral results for the Division of Lang § 1951

1951 Australian federal election: Lang
Party	Candidate	Votes	%	±%
Labor	Dan Mulcahy	20,944	50.0	−0.2
Liberal	Robert Bruce	18,951	45.3	+0.2
Communist	Roy Boyd	1,968	4.7	+0.0
Total formal votes		41,863	98.3	
Informal votes		721	1.7	
Turnout		42,584	97.4	
Two-party-preferred result
Labor	Dan Mulcahy		53.2	−1.5
Liberal	Robert Bruce		46.8	+1.5
Labor hold		Swing	−1.5	

=== Lawson ===
This section is an excerpt from Electoral results for the Division of Lawson § 1951

1951 Australian federal election: Lawson
Party	Candidate	Votes	%	±%
Country	Laurie Failes	19,819	53.0	+22.0
Labor	Alan Manning	17,570	47.0	+4.0
Total formal votes		37,389	98.4	
Informal votes		607	1.6	
Turnout		37,996	96.3	
Country hold		Swing	−2.8	

=== Lowe ===
This section is an excerpt from Electoral results for the Division of Lowe § 1951

1951 Australian federal election: Lowe
Party	Candidate	Votes	%	±%
Liberal	William McMahon	22,276	57.8	+5.1
Labor	John Burton	16,250	42.2	+1.3
Total formal votes		38,526	98.7	
Informal votes		521	1.3	
Turnout		39,047	97.0	
Liberal hold		Swing	−0.7	

=== Lyne ===
This section is an excerpt from Electoral results for the Division of Lyne § 1951

1951 Australian federal election: Lyne
Party	Candidate	Votes	%	±%
Country	Jim Eggins	24,971	65.5	−4.0
Labor	Edward Hayes	11,381	29.9	+2.3
Independent	Joe Cordner	1,745	4.6	+1.7
Total formal votes		38,097	98.4	
Informal votes		615	1.6	
Turnout		38,712	97.0	
Two-party-preferred result
Country	Jim Eggins		68.8	+2.8
Labor	Edward Hayes		31.2	−2.8
Country hold		Swing	+2.8	

=== Macarthur ===
This section is an excerpt from Electoral results for the Division of Macarthur § 1951

1951 Australian federal election: Macarthur
Party	Candidate	Votes	%	±%
Liberal	Jeff Bate	25,835	63.8	−0.8
Labor	William McDonnell	14,633	36.2	+0.8
Total formal votes		40,468	98.5	
Informal votes		622	1.5	
Turnout		41,090	96.0	
Liberal hold		Swing	−0.8	

=== Mackellar ===
This section is an excerpt from Electoral results for the Division of Mackellar § 1951

1951 Australian federal election: Mackellar
Party	Candidate	Votes	%	±%
Liberal	Bill Wentworth	26,832	63.1	+0.5
Labor	Thomas Sherley	15,684	36.9	−0.5
Total formal votes		42,516	98.8	
Informal votes		953	2.2	
Turnout		43,469	95.2	
Liberal hold		Swing	+0.5	

=== Macquarie ===
This section is an excerpt from Electoral results for the Division of Macquarie § 1951

1951 Australian federal election: Macquarie
Party	Candidate	Votes	%	±%
Labor	Ben Chifley	23,136	61.8	+4.1
Liberal	Bob Cotton	14,325	38.2	−0.6
Total formal votes		37,461	98.5	
Informal votes		555	1.5	
Turnout		38,016	96.9	
Labor hold		Swing	+0.8	

=== Martin ===
This section is an excerpt from Electoral results for the Division of Martin § 1951

1951 Australian federal election: Martin
Party	Candidate	Votes	%	±%
Labor	William O'Connor	20,362	53.9	+0.4
Liberal	George Read	14,132	37.4	−0.4
Communist	Terry Gordon	2,379	6.3	+1.5
Independent	Malinda Ivey	908	2.4	+2.4
Total formal votes		37,781	97.5	
Informal votes		974	2.5	
Turnout		38,755	96.6	
Two-party-preferred result
Labor	William O'Connor		60.8	+1.2
Liberal	George Read		39.2	−1.2
Labor hold		Swing	+1.2	

=== Mitchell ===
This section is an excerpt from Electoral results for the Division of Mitchell § 1951

1951 Australian federal election: Mitchell
Party	Candidate	Votes	%	±%
Liberal	Roy Wheeler	23,028	53.8	−3.1
Labor	Joseph White	17,580	41.1	−2.0
Communist	Mel McCalman	2,158	5.0	+5.0
Total formal votes		42,766	97.8	
Informal votes		978	2.2	
Turnout		43,744	95.7	
Two-party-preferred result
Liberal	Roy Wheeler		55.3	−1.6
Labor	Joseph White		44.7	+1.6
Liberal hold		Swing	−1.6	

=== New England ===
This section is an excerpt from Electoral results for the Division of New England § 1951

1951 Australian federal election: New England
Party	Candidate	Votes	%	±%
Country	David Drummond	21,259	57.9	−5.1
Labor	William Wilson	15,462	42.1	+5.1
Total formal votes		36,721	98.7	
Informal votes		491	1.3	
Turnout		37,212	96.7	
Country hold		Swing	−3.3	

=== Newcastle ===
This section is an excerpt from Electoral results for the Division of Newcastle1951

1951 Australian federal election: Newcastle
Party	Candidate	Votes	%	±%
Labor	David Watkins	23,152	60.5	+4.8
Liberal	Roy Stewart	13,485	35.2	−4.7
Communist	Laurie Aarons	1,645	4.3	+1.1
Total formal votes		38,282	98.4	
Informal votes		606	1.6	
Turnout		38,888	96.9	
Two-party-preferred result
Labor	David Watkins		63.4	+5.1
Liberal	Roy Stewart		36.6	−5.1
Labor hold		Swing	+5.1	

=== North Sydney ===
This section is an excerpt from Electoral results for the Division of North Sydney § 1951

1951 Australian federal election: North Sydney
Party	Candidate	Votes	%	±%
Liberal	William Jack	22,110	58.0	+7.1
Labor	Eileen Powell	15,984	42.0	+0.3
Total formal votes		38,094	98.3	
Informal votes		643	1.7	
Turnout		38,737	96.4	
Liberal hold		Swing	+4.7	

=== Parkes ===
This section is an excerpt from Electoral results for the Division of Parkes (1901–1969) § 1951

1951 Australian federal election: Parkes
Party	Candidate	Votes	%	±%
Labor	Les Haylen	18,964	50.9	−0.9
Liberal	Dick Dein	18,283	49.1	+0.9
Total formal votes		37,247	98.2	
Informal votes		676	1.8	
Turnout		37,923	96.1	
Labor hold		Swing	−0.9	

=== Parramatta ===
This section is an excerpt from Electoral results for the Division of Parramatta § 1951

1951 Australian federal election: Parramatta
Party	Candidate	Votes	%	±%
Liberal	Howard Beale	26,852	63.5	+0.9
Labor	John Holmes	15,422	36.5	−0.9
Total formal votes		42,274	98.0	
Informal votes		855	2.0	
Turnout		43,129	96.2	
Liberal hold		Swing	+0.9	

=== Paterson ===
This section is an excerpt from Electoral results for the Division of Paterson § 1951

1951 Australian federal election: Paterson
Party	Candidate	Votes	%	±%
Liberal	Allen Fairhall	21,677	57.1	+27.0
Labor	Cecil Robinson	16,312	42.9	+5.0
Total formal votes		37,989	98.1	
Informal votes		736	1.9	
Turnout		38,725	97.1	
Liberal hold		Swing	−1.4	

=== Phillip ===
This section is an excerpt from Electoral results for the Division of Phillip § 1951

1951 Australian federal election: Phillip
Party	Candidate	Votes	%	±%
Labor	Joe Fitzgerald	19,401	53.4	+2.2
Liberal	Les Fingleton	16,913	46.6	+3.7
Total formal votes		36,314	97.9	
Informal votes		779	2.1	
Turnout		37,093	95.4	
Labor hold		Swing	−2.3	

=== Reid ===
This section is an excerpt from Electoral results for the Division of Reid § 1951

1951 Australian federal election: Reid
Party	Candidate	Votes	%	±%
Labor	Charles Morgan	28,115	62.4	+4.3
Liberal	Jim Clough	15,051	33.4	+4.4
Independent	Rupert Sheldon	1,903	4.2	+4.2
Total formal votes		45,069	98.1	
Informal votes		895	1.9	
Turnout		45,964	96.2	
Two-party-preferred result
Labor	Charles Morgan		65.6	−2.2
Liberal	Jim Clough		34.4	+2.2
Labor hold		Swing	−2.2	

=== Richmond ===
This section is an excerpt from Electoral results for the Division of Richmond § 1951

1951 Australian federal election: Richmond
Party	Candidate	Votes	%	±%
Country	Larry Anthony	28,034	76.3	+1.2
Labor	Alexander Bryen	8,718	23.7	−1.2
Total formal votes		36,752	98.7	
Informal votes		486	1.3	
Turnout		37,238	96.4	
Country hold		Swing	+1.2	

=== Riverina ===
This section is an excerpt from Electoral results for the Division of Riverina § 1951

1951 Australian federal election: Riverina
Party	Candidate	Votes	%	±%
Country	Hugh Roberton	19,781	53.3	+0.0
Labor	Michael Sheehan	15,975	43.0	−2.2
Communist	Les Kelton	1,358	3.7	+2.2
Total formal votes		37,114	98.6	
Informal votes		510	1.4	
Turnout		37,624	95.1	
Two-party-preferred result
Country	Hugh Roberton		54.7	+1.2
Labor	Michael Sheehan		45.3	−1.2
Country hold		Swing	+1.2	

=== Robertson ===
This section is an excerpt from Electoral results for the Division of Robertson § 1951

1951 Australian federal election: Robertson
Party	Candidate	Votes	%	±%
Liberal	Roger Dean	22,804	54.0	−0.2
Labor	Walter Geraghty	19,406	46.0	+0.2
Total formal votes		42,210	98.0	
Informal votes		874	2.0	
Turnout		43,084	96.2	
Liberal hold		Swing	−0.2	

=== Shortland ===
This section is an excerpt from Electoral results for the Division of Shortland § 1951

1951 Australian federal election: Shortland
Party	Candidate	Votes	%	±%
Labor	Charles Griffiths	26,708	65.0	+10.6
Liberal	Arthur Downey	14,369	35.0	+8.9
Total formal votes		41,077	98.1	
Informal votes		781	1.9	
Turnout		41,858	97.0	
Labor hold		Swing	+0.9	

=== St George ===
This section is an excerpt from Electoral results for the Division of St George § 1951

1951 Australian federal election: St George
Party	Candidate	Votes	%	±%
Liberal	Bill Graham	19,890	51.6	−0.4
Labor	Nelson Lemmon	18,670	48.4	+0.4
Total formal votes		38,560	98.3	
Informal votes		654	1.7	
Turnout		39,214	97.0	
Liberal hold		Swing	−0.4	

=== Warringah ===
This section is an excerpt from Electoral results for the Division of Warringah § 1951

1951 Australian federal election: Warringah
Party	Candidate	Votes	%	±%
Liberal	Francis Bland	29,362	75.7	+5.4
Labor	Frank McCullum	9,417	24.3	+24.3
Total formal votes		38,779	98.2	
Informal votes		691	1.8	
Turnout		39,470	95.4	
Liberal hold		Swing	+5.4	

=== Watson ===
This section is an excerpt from Electoral results for the Division of Watson (1934–1969) § 1951

1951 Australian federal election: Watson
Party	Candidate	Votes	%	±%
Labor	Dan Curtin	22,510	56.7	+7.3
Liberal	Donald Clark	17,158	43.3	+5.0
Total formal votes		39,668	97.4	
Informal votes		1,051	2.6	
Turnout		40,719	95.6	
Labor hold		Swing	−2.3	

=== Wentworth ===
This section is an excerpt from Electoral results for the Division of Wentworth § 1951

1951 Australian federal election: Wentworth
Party	Candidate	Votes	%	±%
Liberal	Eric Harrison	28,127	75.7	+0.6
Labor	Cecil Trevelyan	9,041	24.3	−0.6
Total formal votes		37,168	98.4	
Informal votes		614	1.6	
Turnout		37,782	95.3	
Liberal hold		Swing	+0.6	

=== Werriwa ===
This section is an excerpt from Electoral results for the Division of Werriwa § 1951

1951 Australian federal election: Werriwa
Party	Candidate	Votes	%	±%
Labor	Bert Lazzarini	26,104	55.1	−1.1
Liberal	Ian Griffith	21,257	44.9	+1.1
Total formal votes		47,361	97.7	
Informal votes		1,114	2.3	
Turnout		48,475	95.6	
Labor hold		Swing	−1.1	

=== West Sydney ===
This section is an excerpt from Electoral results for the Division of West Sydney § 1951

1951 Australian federal election: West Sydney
Party	Candidate	Votes	%	±%
Labor	Dan Minogue	21,123	63.4	+13.6
Liberal	Basil Mottershead	8,203	24.6	+4.3
Communist	Jack Miles	3,483	10.4	+5.4
Independent Labor	Clare Peters	528	1.6	+1.6
Total formal votes		33,337	96.2	
Informal votes		1,300	3.8	
Turnout		34,637	91.9	
Two-party-preferred result
Labor	Dan Minogue		74.6	+18.9
Liberal	Basil Mottershead		25.4	+25.4
Labor hold		Swing	+18.9	

== Victoria ==
1951 Australian federal election (Victoria)
← 1949	28 April 1951	1954 →

All 33 Victorian seats in the House of Representatives 17 seats needed for a majority
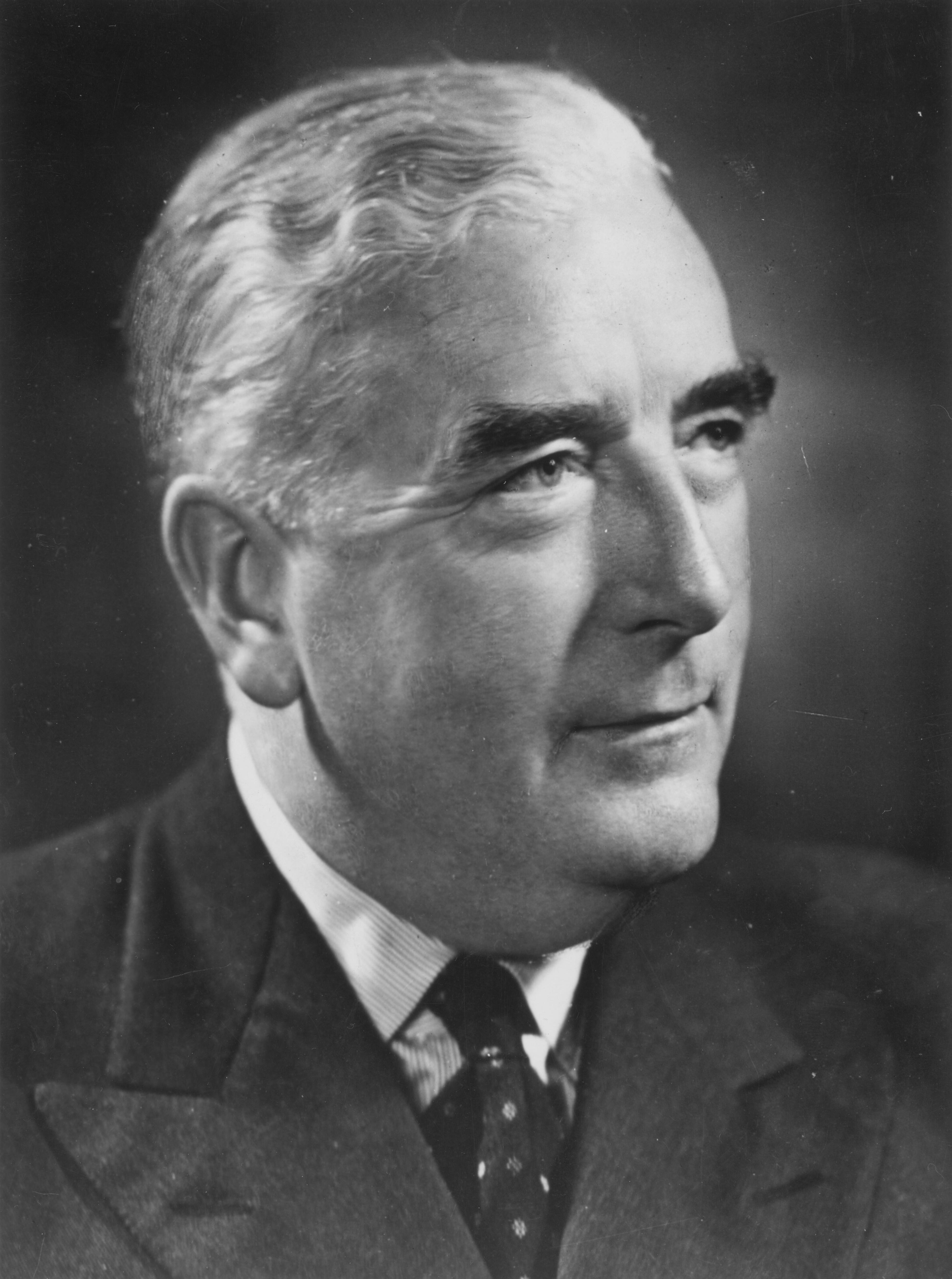

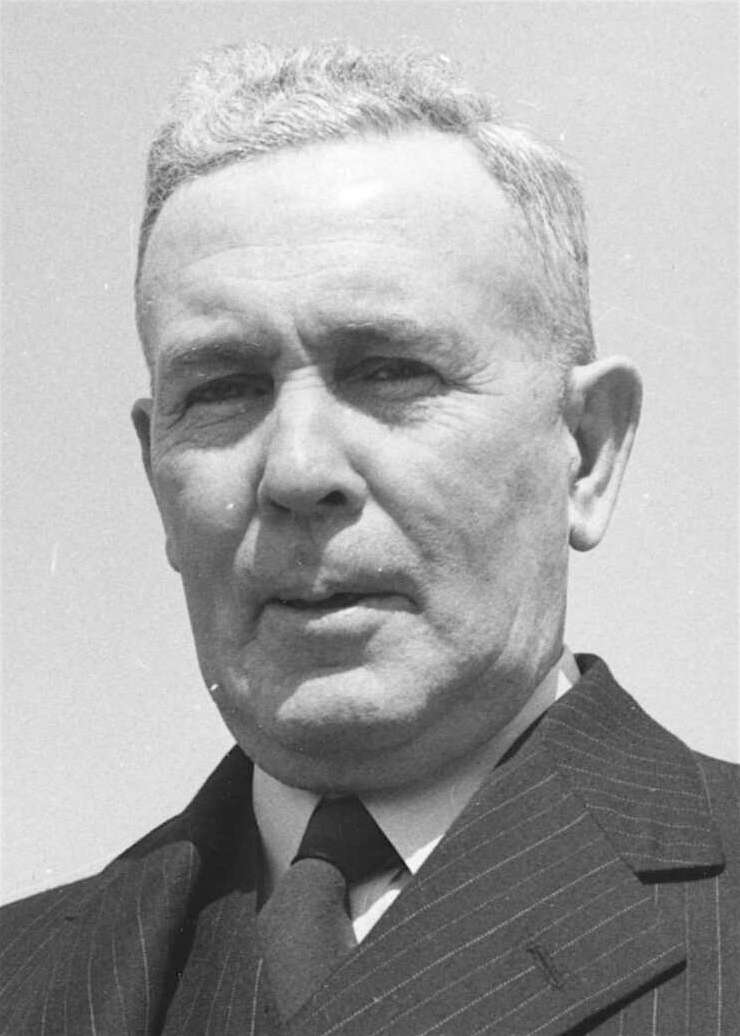
	First party	Second party
Leader	Robert Menzies	Ben Chifley
Party	Coalition	Labor
Seats before	20	13
Seats won	18	15
Seat change	▼2	▲2
Popular vote	639,229	630,861
Percentage	49.2%	48.6%
Swing	▼0.3pp	▲1.9pp
TPP	50.7%	49.3%
TPP swing	▲1.0pp	▼1.0pp

=== Balaclava ===
This section is an excerpt from Electoral results for the Division of Balaclava § 1951

1951 Australian federal election: Balaclava
Party	Candidate	Votes	%	±%
Liberal	Thomas White	25,578	63.3	−0.6
Labor	Arthur Lewis	14,845	36.7	+0.6
Total formal votes		40,423	98.7	
Informal votes		525	1.3	
Turnout		40,948	96.1	
Liberal hold		Swing	−0.6	

=== Ballaarat ===
This section is an excerpt from Electoral results for the Division of Ballarat § 1951

1951 Australian federal election: Ballaarat
Party	Candidate	Votes	%	±%
Labor	Bob Joshua	20,482	51.2	+1.6
Liberal	Alan Pittard	19,517	48.8	−1.6
Total formal votes		39,999	99.1	
Informal votes		356	0.9	
Turnout		40,355	97.2	
Labor gain from Liberal		Swing	+1.6	

=== Batman ===
This section is an excerpt from Electoral results for the Division of Batman § 1951

1951 Australian federal election: Batman
Party	Candidate	Votes	%	±%
Labor	Alan Bird	23,335	60.6	+2.2
Liberal	Fred Capp	15,184	39.4	−2.2
Total formal votes		38,519	98.3	
Informal votes		673	1.7	
Turnout		39,192	95.8	
Labor hold		Swing	+2.2	

=== Bendigo ===
This section is an excerpt from Electoral results for the Division of Bendigo § 1951

1951 Australian federal election: Bendigo
Party	Candidate	Votes	%	±%
Labor	Percy Clarey	21,975	53.6	+6.6
Liberal	Charles Carty-Salmon	18,997	46.4	−1.3
Total formal votes		40,972	98.8	
Informal votes		509	1.2	
Turnout		41,481	96.8	
Labor hold		Swing	+3.4	

=== Burke ===
This section is an excerpt from Electoral results for the Division of Burke (1949–1955) § 1951

1951 Australian federal election: Burke
Party	Candidate	Votes	%	±%
Labor	Ted Peters	27,422	72.4	+10.3
Liberal	Alfred Wall	10,446	27.6	+2.4
Total formal votes		37,868	97.8	
Informal votes		861	2.2	
Turnout		38,729	96.1	
Labor hold		Swing	+3.0	

=== Chisholm ===
This section is an excerpt from Electoral results for the Division of Chisholm § 1951

1951 Australian federal election: Chisholm
Party	Candidate	Votes	%	±%
Liberal	Wilfrid Kent Hughes	27,016	65.0	+0.3
Labor	Ronald Whiting	14,563	35.0	+1.9
Total formal votes		41,579	98.8	
Informal votes		501	1.2	
Turnout		42,080	95.7	
Liberal hold		Swing	+0.1	

=== Corangamite ===
This section is an excerpt from Electoral results for the Division of Corangamite § 1951

1951 Australian federal election: Corangamite
Party	Candidate	Votes	%	±%
Liberal	Allan McDonald	22,087	58.7	+1.2
Labor	Angus McLean	15,535	41.3	+1.7
Total formal votes		37,622	99.1	
Informal votes		357	0.9	
Turnout		37,979	97.0	
Liberal hold		Swing	−1.3	

=== Corio ===
This section is an excerpt from Electoral results for the Division of Corio § 1951

1951 Australian federal election: Corio
Party	Candidate	Votes	%	±%
Liberal	Hubert Opperman	20,731	50.2	−0.1
Labor	John Dedman	20,592	49.8	+0.1
Total formal votes		41,323	99.1	
Informal votes		368	0.9	
Turnout		41,691	96.2	
Liberal hold		Swing	−0.1	

=== Darebin ===
This section is an excerpt from Electoral results for the Division of Darebin § 1951

1951 Australian federal election: Darebin
Party	Candidate	Votes	%	±%
Labor	Tom Andrews	26,412	64.4	+1.7
Liberal	Gordon Savage	14,572	35.6	−1.7
Total formal votes		40,984	98.6	
Informal votes		581	1.4	
Turnout		41,565	96.9	
Labor hold		Swing	+1.7	

=== Deakin ===
This section is an excerpt from Electoral results for the Division of Deakin § 1951

1951 Australian federal election: Deakin
Party	Candidate	Votes	%	±%
Liberal	Frank Davis	22,946	48.6	−7.0
Labor	Gordon Bryant	21,908	46.4	+2.0
Independent	Eric Butler	2,364	5.0	+5.0
Total formal votes		47,218	98.7	
Informal votes		617	1.3	
Turnout		47,835	95.3	
Two-party-preferred result
Liberal	Frank Davis	24,347	51.6	−4.0
Labor	Gordon Bryant	22,871	48.4	+4.0
Liberal hold		Swing	−4.0	

=== Fawkner ===
This section is an excerpt from Electoral results for the Division of Fawkner § 1951

1951 Australian federal election: Fawkner
Party	Candidate	Votes	%	±%
Labor	Bill Bourke	20,158	51.6	+1.6
Liberal	Peter Howson	18,586	47.6	−2.4
Independent	Colin Kennedy	332	0.8	+0.8
Total formal votes		39,076	98.3	
Informal votes		681	1.7	
Turnout		39,757	95.7	
Two-party-preferred result
Labor	Bill Bourke		52.0	+2.0
Liberal	Peter Howson		48.0	−2.0
Labor hold		Swing	+2.0	

=== Flinders ===
This section is an excerpt from Electoral results for the Division of Flinders § 1951

1951 Australian federal election: Flinders
Party	Candidate	Votes	%	±%
Liberal	Rupert Ryan	22,728	54.8	+0.0
Labor	Keith Ewert	17,833	43.0	+13.4
Independent	Robert Hipwell	891	2.1	+2.1
Total formal votes		41,452	98.4	
Informal votes		663	1.6	
Turnout		42,115	96.2	
Two-party-preferred result
Liberal	Rupert Ryan		55.9	−7.7
Labor	Keith Ewert		44.1	+7.7
Liberal hold		Swing	−7.7	

=== Gellibrand ===
This section is an excerpt from Electoral results for the Division of Gellibrand § 1951

1951 Australian federal election: Gellibrand
Party	Candidate	Votes	%	±%
Labor	John Mullens	25,863	64.9	+13.6
Liberal	Gordon Trewin	9,973	25.0	−2.8
Communist	Alex Dobbin	4,003	10.0	+6.5
Total formal votes		39,839	97.8	
Informal votes		896	2.2	
Turnout		40,735	96.5	
Two-party-preferred result
Labor	John Mullens		74.4	+4.7
Liberal	Gordon Trewin		25.6	−4.7
Labor hold		Swing	+4.7	

=== Gippsland ===
This section is an excerpt from Electoral results for the Division of Gippsland § 1951

1951 Australian federal election: Gippsland
Party	Candidate	Votes	%	±%
Country	George Bowden	22,799	65.1	−1.6
Labor	Victor Fitzgerald	12,247	34.9	+1.6
Total formal votes		35,046	98.5	
Informal votes		521	1.5	
Turnout		35,567	95.9	
Country hold		Swing	−1.6	

=== Henty ===
This section is an excerpt from Electoral results for the Division of Henty § 1951

1951 Australian federal election: Henty
Party	Candidate	Votes	%	±%
Liberal	Jo Gullett	23,642	57.3	+2.1
Labor	Percy Treyvaud	16,814	40.8	−1.9
Communist	Doris McRae	781	1.9	+1.9
Total formal votes		41,237	98.6	
Informal votes		584	1.4	
Turnout		41,821	96.4	
Two-party-preferred result
Liberal	Jo Gullett		57.5	+2.1
Labor	Percy Treyvaud		42.5	−2.1
Liberal hold		Swing	+2.1	

=== Higgins ===
This section is an excerpt from Electoral results for the Division of Higgins § 1951

1951 Australian federal election: Higgins
Party	Candidate	Votes	%	±%
Liberal	Harold Holt	24,217	64.4	−2.4
Labor	Benjamin Nicholas	11,490	30.5	−2.7
Independent	Mary Kent Hughes	1,925	5.1	+5.1
Total formal votes		37,632	98.5	
Informal votes		584	1.5	
Turnout		38,216	94.2	
Two-party-preferred result
Liberal	Harold Holt		68.2	+1.4
Labor	Benjamin Nicholas		31.8	−1.4
Liberal hold		Swing	+1.4	

=== Higinbotham ===
This section is an excerpt from Electoral results for the Division of Higinbotham § 1951

1951 Australian federal election: Higinbotham
Party	Candidate	Votes	%	±%
Liberal	Frank Timson	25,493	54.4	+0.8
Labor	Geoffrey Sowerbutts	21,368	45.6	−0.8
Total formal votes		46,861	98.6	
Informal votes		644	1.4	
Turnout		47,505	96.4	
Liberal hold		Swing	+0.8	

=== Hoddle ===
This section is an excerpt from Electoral results for the Division of Hoddle § 1951

1951 Australian federal election: Hoddle
Party	Candidate	Votes	%	±%
Labor	Jack Cremean	27,685	78.7	+1.6
Liberal	Jack Easton	6,193	17.6	−0.3
Communist	Leslie Loye	1,310	3.7	+0.6
Total formal votes		35,188	96.5	
Informal votes		1,276	3.5	
Turnout		36,464	94.4	
Two-party-preferred result
Labor	Jack Cremean		82.1	+1.3
Liberal	Jack Easton		17.9	−1.3
Labor hold		Swing	+1.3	

=== Indi ===
This section is an excerpt from Electoral results for the Division of Indi § 1951

1951 Australian federal election: Indi
Party	Candidate	Votes	%	±%
Liberal	William Bostock	22,137	58.6	+25.3
Labor	Charles Edmondson	15,623	41.4	+4.7
Total formal votes		37,760	98.8	
Informal votes		445	1.2	
Turnout		38,205	95.5	
Liberal hold		Swing	−1.1	

=== Isaacs ===
This section is an excerpt from Electoral results for the Division of Isaacs (1949–1969) § 1951

1951 Australian federal election: Isaacs
Party	Candidate	Votes	%	±%
Liberal	William Haworth	19,548	51.5	−2.5
Labor	John Bourke	16,165	42.6	−3.4
Independent Labor	Sam Goldbloom	2,224	5.9	+5.9
Total formal votes		37,937	97.9	
Informal votes		818	2.1	
Turnout		38,755	94.6	
Two-party-preferred result
Liberal	William Haworth		52.1	−1.9
Labor	John Bourke		47.9	+1.9
Liberal hold		Swing	−1.9	

=== Kooyong ===
This section is an excerpt from Electoral results for the Division of Kooyong § 1951

1951 Australian federal election: Kooyong
Party	Candidate	Votes	%	±%
Liberal	Robert Menzies	28,174	67.4	+0.3
Labor	Maurice Sheehy	11,873	28.4	−4.5
Communist	Ted Laurie	1,734	4.2	+4.2
Total formal votes		41,781	98.8	
Informal votes		516	1.2	
Turnout		42,297	96.2	
Two-party-preferred result
Liberal	Robert Menzies		68.8	+1.7
Labor	Maurice Sheehy		31.2	−1.7
Liberal hold		Swing	+1.7	

=== La Trobe ===
This section is an excerpt from Electoral results for the Division of La Trobe § 1951

1951 Australian federal election: La Trobe
Party	Candidate	Votes	%	±%
Liberal	Richard Casey	26,920	58.0	−0.6
Labor	Bernard Rees	19,464	42.0	+0.6
Total formal votes		46,384	98.1	
Informal votes		877	1.9	
Turnout		47,261	96.0	
Liberal hold		Swing	−0.6	

=== Lalor ===
This section is an excerpt from Electoral results for the Division of Lalor § 1951

1951 Australian federal election: Lalor
Party	Candidate	Votes	%	±%
Labor	Reg Pollard	23,278	54.9	+3.3
Liberal	Allen Bateman	19,103	45.1	−3.3
Total formal votes		42,381	98.5	
Informal votes		635	1.5	
Turnout		43,016	95.2	
Labor hold		Swing	+3.3	

=== Mallee ===
This section is an excerpt from Electoral results for the Division of Mallee § 1951

1951 Australian federal election: Mallee
Party	Candidate	Votes	%	±%
Country	Winton Turnbull	21,784	61.7	−2.9
Labor	Alfred O'Connor	13,542	38.3	+2.9
Total formal votes		35,326	98.5	
Informal votes		527	1.5	
Turnout		35,853	97.5	
Country hold		Swing	−2.9	

=== Maribyrnong ===
This section is an excerpt from Electoral results for the Division of Maribyrnong § 1951

1951 Australian federal election: Maribyrnong
Party	Candidate	Votes	%	±%
Labor	Arthur Drakeford	27,963	64.3	+2.4
Liberal	Stuart Collie	15,502	35.7	+1.6
Total formal votes		43,465	98.5	
Informal votes		661	1.5	
Turnout		44,126	96.9	
Labor hold		Swing	+0.3	

=== McMillan ===
This section is an excerpt from Electoral results for the Division of McMillan § 1951

1951 Australian federal election: McMillan
Party	Candidate	Votes	%	±%
Liberal	Geoffrey Brown	21,465	55.7	+23.3
Labor	Horace Hawkins	15,717	40.8	+2.1
Communist	Fred Charlesworth	1,328	3.4	+0.9
Total formal votes		38,510	98.1	
Informal votes		747	1.9	
Turnout		39,257	95.7	
Two-party-preferred result
Liberal	Geoffrey Brown		56.0	−0.9
Labor	Horace Hawkins		44.0	+0.9
Liberal hold		Swing	−0.9	

=== Melbourne ===
This section is an excerpt from Electoral results for the Division of Melbourne § 1951

1951 Australian federal election: Melbourne
Party	Candidate	Votes	%	±%
Labor	Arthur Calwell	23,131	63.0	−1.5
Liberal	Desmond Byrne	12,168	33.1	+8.1
Communist	Gerry O'Day	1,441	3.9	+0.6
Total formal votes		36,740	96.5	
Informal votes		1,324	3.5	
Turnout		38,064	93.8	
Two-party-preferred result
Labor	Arthur Calwell		66.6	−4.3
Liberal	Desmond Byrne		33.4	+4.3
Labor hold		Swing	−4.3	

=== Melbourne Ports ===
This section is an excerpt from Electoral results for the Division of Melbourne Ports § 1951

1951 Australian federal election: Melbourne Ports
Party	Candidate	Votes	%	±%
Labor	Frank Crean	26,502	71.2	+3.3
Liberal	Michael Prowse	10,740	28.8	−3.3
Total formal votes		37,242	97.8	
Informal votes		839	2.2	
Turnout		38,081	94.9	
Labor hold		Swing	+3.3	

=== Murray ===
This section is an excerpt from Electoral results for the Division of Murray § 1951

1951 Australian federal election: Murray
Party	Candidate	Votes	%	±%
Country	John McEwen	23,248	61.0	−2.5
Labor	Gordon Anderson	14,834	39.0	+2.5
Total formal votes		38,082	98.7	
Informal votes		502	1.3	
Turnout		38,584	96.1	
Country hold		Swing	−2.5	

=== Wannon ===
This section is an excerpt from Electoral results for the Division of Wannon § 1951

1951 Australian federal election: Wannon
Party	Candidate	Votes	%	±%
Labor	Don McLeod	18,427	51.1	+4.0
Liberal	Dan Mackinnon	17,601	48.9	+12.0
Total formal votes		36,028	99.2	
Informal votes		299	0.8	
Turnout		36,327	97.6	
Labor gain from Liberal		Swing	+1.9	

=== Wills ===
This section is an excerpt from Electoral results for the Division of Wills § 1951

1951 Australian federal election: Wills
Party	Candidate	Votes	%	±%
Labor	Bill Bryson	21,136	48.9	+4.7
Liberal	Baden Grafen	14,461	33.5	−1.8
Progressive Labor	Doris Blackburn	7,595	17.6	−3.0
Total formal votes		43,192	98.2	
Informal votes		782	1.8	
Turnout		43,974	96.3	
Two-party-preferred result
Labor	Bill Bryson	26,682	61.8	+3.0
Liberal	Baden Grafen	16,510	38.2	−3.0
Labor hold		Swing	+3.0	

=== Wimmera ===
This section is an excerpt from Electoral results for the Division of Wimmera § 1951

1951 Australian federal election: Wimmera
Party	Candidate	Votes	%	±%
Liberal	William Lawrence	22,005	63.0	+24.0
Labor	Cyril Sudholz	12,932	37.0	+5.3
Total formal votes		34,937	99.0	
Informal votes		358	1.0	
Turnout		35,295	96.9	
Liberal hold		Swing	−1.9	

=== Yarra ===
This section is an excerpt from Electoral results for the Division of Yarra § 1951

1951 Australian federal election: Yarra
Party	Candidate	Votes	%	±%
Labor	Stan Keon	23,039	60.1	+1.3
Liberal	Kenneth Bisney	13,668	35.7	−0.2
Communist	Ken Miller	1,619	4.2	+1.4
Total formal votes		38,326	97.7	
Informal votes		883	2.3	
Turnout		39,209	95.6	
Two-party-preferred result
Labor	Stan Keon		63.9	+1.2
Liberal	Kenneth Bisney		36.1	−1.2
Labor hold		Swing	+1.2	

== Queensland ==
1951 Australian federal election (Queensland)
← 1949	28 April 1951	1954 →

All 18 Queensland seats in the House of Representatives 9 seats needed for a majority
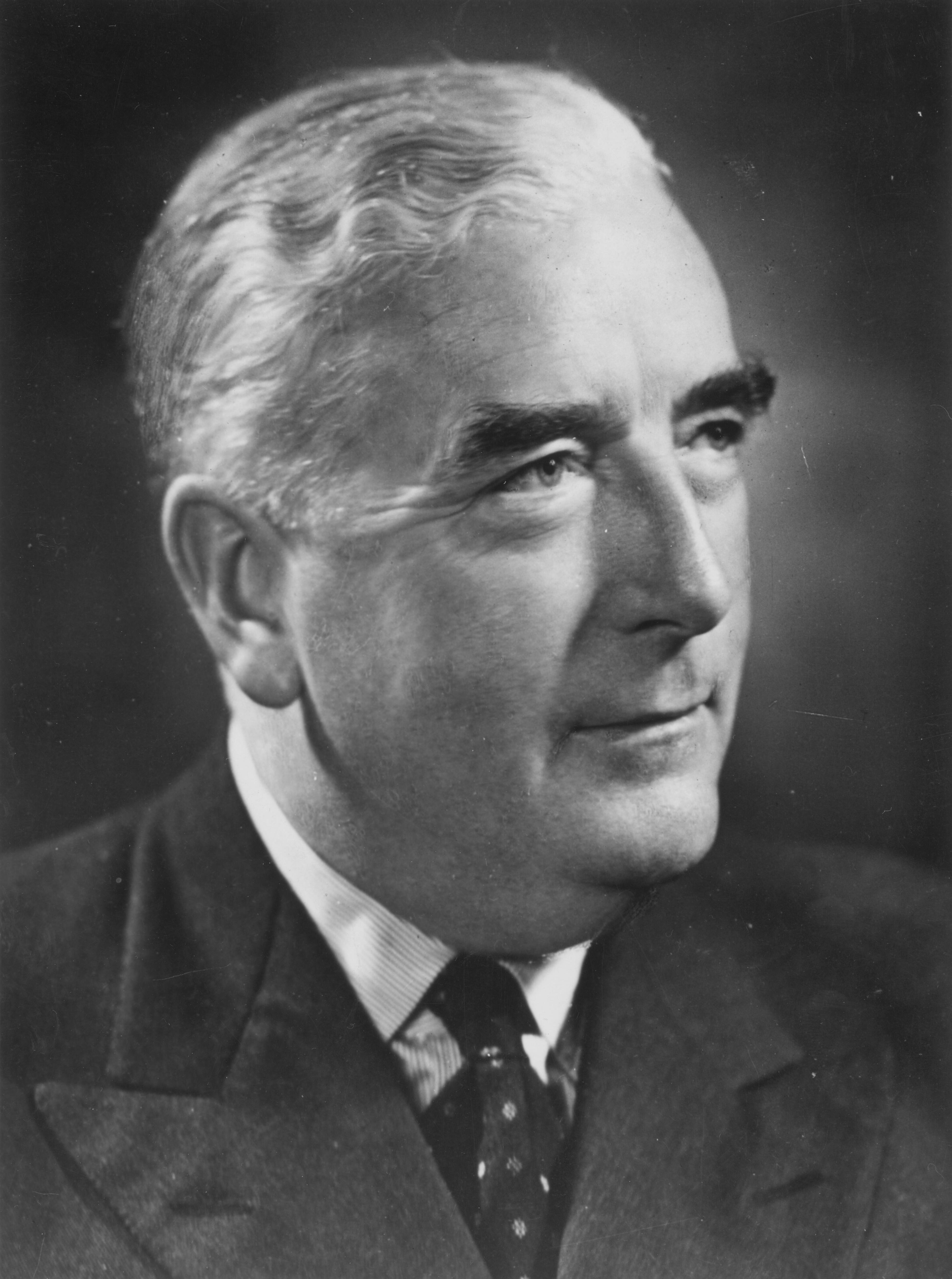

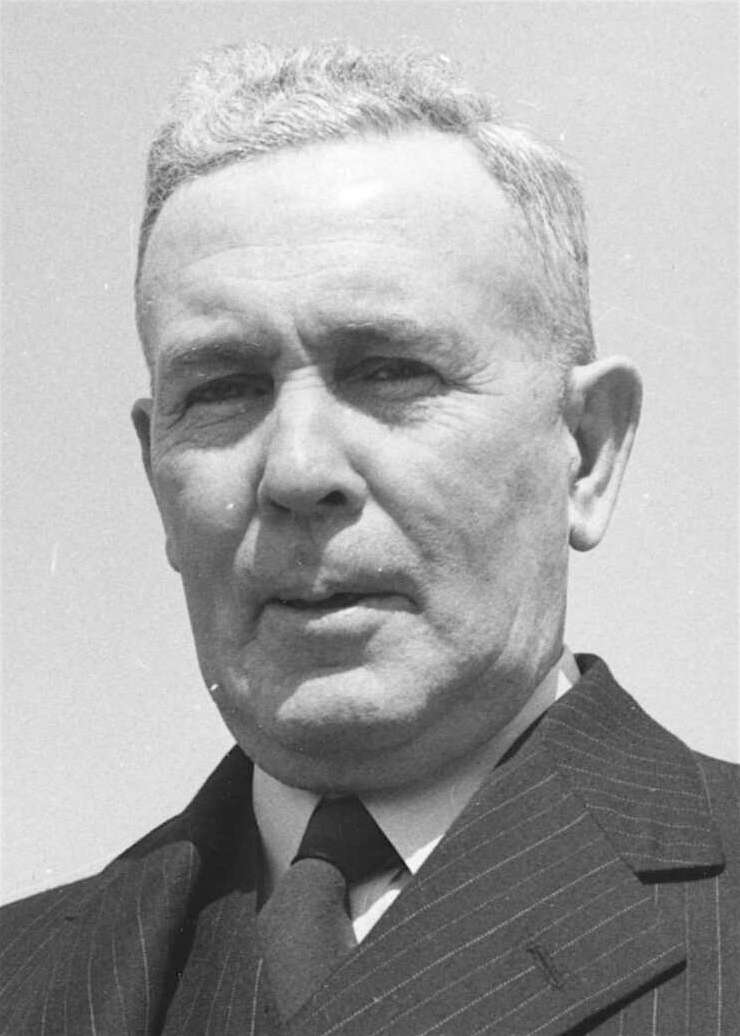
	First party	Second party
Leader	Robert Menzies	Ben Chifley
Party	Coalition	Labor
Seats before	15	3
Seats won	14	4
Seat change	▼1	▲1
Popular vote	342,677	265,487
Percentage	54.7%	42.3%
Swing	▼1.6pp	▲2.8pp
TPP	56.5%	43.5%
TPP swing	▼0.8pp	▲0.8pp

=== Bowman ===
This section is an excerpt from Electoral results for the Division of Bowman § 1951

1951 Australian federal election: Bowman
Party	Candidate	Votes	%	±%
Liberal	Malcolm McColm	21,410	54.1	+0.7
Labor	Michael Lyons	16,637	42.0	−2.9
Communist	Mabel Hanson	1,552	3.9	+2.2
Total formal votes		39,599	97.8	
Informal votes		907	2.2	
Turnout		40,506	96.0	
Two-party-preferred result
Liberal	Malcolm McColm		55.6	+1.8
Labor	Michael Lyons		44.4	−1.8
Liberal hold		Swing	+1.8	

=== Brisbane ===
This section is an excerpt from Electoral results for the Division of Brisbane § 1951

1951 Australian federal election: Brisbane
Party	Candidate	Votes	%	±%
Labor	George Lawson	18,588	53.6	+1.3
Liberal	Donagh McDonagh	13,883	40.0	−2.3
Communist	Alby Graham	2,225	6.4	+1.0
Total formal votes		34,696	97.5	
Informal votes		886	2.5	
Turnout		35,582	93.5	
Two-party-preferred result
Labor	George Lawson		59.5	+2.2
Liberal	Donagh McDonagh		40.5	−2.2
Labor hold		Swing	+2.2	

=== Capricornia ===
This section is an excerpt from Electoral results for the Division of Capricornia § 1951

1951 Australian federal election: Capricornia
Party	Candidate	Votes	%	±%
Liberal	Henry Pearce	17,073	51.9	−0.2
Labor	Mick Gardner	15,848	48.1	+1.5
Total formal votes		32,921	99.0	
Informal votes		346	1.0	
Turnout		33,267	96.7	
Liberal hold		Swing	−0.4	

=== Darling Downs ===
This section is an excerpt from Electoral results for the Division of Darling Downs § 1951

1951 Australian federal election: Darling Downs
Party	Candidate	Votes	%	±%
Liberal	Reginald Swartz	unopposed		
Liberal hold		Swing		

=== Dawson ===
This section is an excerpt from Electoral results for the Division of Dawson § 1951

1951 Australian federal election: Dawson
Party	Candidate	Votes	%	±%
Country	Charles Davidson	19,058	56.3	−2.1
Labor	George Hyde	14,773	43.7	+6.2
Total formal votes		33,831	98.4	
Informal votes		554	1.6	
Turnout		34,385	95.3	
Country hold		Swing	−2.3	

=== Fisher ===
This section is an excerpt from Electoral results for the Division of Fisher § 1951

1951 Australian federal election: Fisher
Party	Candidate	Votes	%	±%
Country	Charles Adermann	29,417	72.9	+6.4
Labor	Geoffrey Arnell	10,952	27.1	+2.2
Total formal votes		40,369	98.6	
Informal votes		575	1.4	
Turnout		40,944	96.9	
Country hold		Swing	+2.2	

=== Griffith ===
This section is an excerpt from Electoral results for the Division of Griffith § 1951

1951 Australian federal election: Griffith
Party	Candidate	Votes	%	±%
Liberal	Doug Berry	19,019	53.7	+2.0
Labor	William Thieme	16,373	46.3	+0.0
Total formal votes		35,392	97.6	
Informal votes		852	2.4	
Turnout		36,244	95.5	
Liberal hold		Swing	+1.8	

=== Herbert ===
This section is an excerpt from Electoral results for the Division of Herbert § 1951

1951 Australian federal election: Herbert
Party	Candidate	Votes	%	±%
Labor	Bill Edmonds	19,445	54.1	+4.7
Country	Doug Jeffrey	15,332	42.7	−2.7
Communist	Gloria Phelan	1,160	3.2	−2.0
Total formal votes		35,937	97.3	
Informal votes		991	2.7	
Turnout		36,928	93.7	
Two-party-preferred result
Labor	Bill Edmonds		57.0	+3.3
Country	Doug Jeffrey		43.0	−3.3
Labor hold		Swing	+3.3	

=== Kennedy ===
This section is an excerpt from Electoral results for the Division of Kennedy § 1951

1951 Australian federal election: Kennedy
Party	Candidate	Votes	%	±%
Labor	Bill Riordan	16,700	60.2	+5.1
Country	Ulick Browne	11,038	39.8	−1.7
Total formal votes		27,738	98.3	
Informal votes		494	1.7	
Turnout		28,232	90.5	
Labor hold		Swing	+1.8	

=== Leichhardt ===
This section is an excerpt from Electoral results for the Division of Leichhardt § 1951

1951 Australian federal election: Leichhardt
Party	Candidate	Votes	%	±%
Labor	Harry Bruce	16,827	49.0	+6.7
Country	Tom Gilmore	16,163	47.1	−2.5
Communist	Richard Anear	1,329	3.9	+0.4
Total formal votes		34,319	97.5	
Informal votes		867	2.5	
Turnout		35,186	92.8	
Two-party-preferred result
Labor	Harry Bruce	18,083	52.7	+4.4
Country	Tom Gilmore	16,236	47.3	−4.4
Labor gain from Country		Swing	+4.4	

=== Lilley ===
This section is an excerpt from Electoral results for the Division of Lilley § 1951

1951 Australian federal election: Lilley
Party	Candidate	Votes	%	±%
Liberal	Bruce Wight	22,945	57.8	−1.6
Labor	Jim Hadley	15,055	37.9	−2.7
Independent	Walter Collings	1,681	4.2	+4.2
Total formal votes		39,681	97.9	
Informal votes		865	2.1	
Turnout		40,546	95.2	
Two-party-preferred result
Liberal	Bruce Wight		58.9	−0.5
Labor	Jim Hadley		41.1	+0.5
Liberal hold		Swing	−0.5	

=== Maranoa ===
This section is an excerpt from Electoral results for the Division of Maranoa § 1951

1951 Australian federal election: Maranoa
Party	Candidate	Votes	%	±%
Labor	Alfred Dohring	11,989	37.7	−2.7
Country	Wilfred Brimblecombe	10,316	32.4	−27.2
Independent	Charles Russell	9,502	29.9	+29.9
Total formal votes		31,807	98.5	
Informal votes		475	1.5	
Turnout		32,282	93.4	
Two-party-preferred result
Country	Wilfred Brimblecombe	18,071	56.8	−2.8
Labor	Alfred Dohring	13,736	43.2	+2.8
Country hold		Swing	−2.8	

=== McPherson ===
This section is an excerpt from Electoral results for the Division of McPherson § 1951

1951 Australian federal election: McPherson
Party	Candidate	Votes	%	±%
Country	Arthur Fadden	24,899	74.9	+0.7
Independent	John Rosser	8,338	25.1	+25.1
Total formal votes		33,237	97.8	
Informal votes		747	2.2	
Turnout		33,984	96.4	
Country hold		Swing	+0.7	

=== Moreton ===
This section is an excerpt from Electoral results for the Division of Moreton § 1951

1951 Australian federal election: Moreton
Party	Candidate	Votes	%	±%
Liberal	Josiah Francis	27,146	59.5	−1.9
Labor	Ted Mansfield	17,661	38.7	+2.3
Communist	Bill Yarrow	813	1.8	−0.4
Total formal votes		45,620	98.0	
Informal votes		914	2.0	
Turnout		46,534	96.0	
Two-party-preferred result
Liberal	Josiah Francis		59.7	−1.9
Labor	Ted Mansfield		40.3	+1.9
Liberal hold		Swing	−1.9	

=== Oxley ===
This section is an excerpt from Electoral results for the Division of Oxley § 1951

1951 Australian federal election: Oxley
Party	Candidate	Votes	%	±%
Liberal	Donald Cameron	21,219	58.2	+16.1
Labor	Andrew Crilly	14,648	40.2	−0.1
Communist	Frank O'Connor	602	1.7	+0.1
Total formal votes		36,469	98.2	
Informal votes		656	1.8	
Turnout		37,125	97.5	
Two-party-preferred result
Liberal	Donald Cameron		58.4	+1.6
Labor	Andrew Crilly		41.6	−1.6
Liberal hold		Swing	+1.6	

=== Petrie ===
This section is an excerpt from Electoral results for the Division of Petrie § 1951

1951 Australian federal election: Petrie
Party	Candidate	Votes	%	±%
Liberal	Alan Hulme	24,843	58.6	−1.1
Labor	Patrick Bredhauer	17,533	41.4	+4.8
Total formal votes		42,376	98.0	
Informal votes		849	2.0	
Turnout		43,225	95.9	
Liberal hold		Swing	−3.0	

=== Ryan ===
This section is an excerpt from Electoral results for the Division of Ryan § 1951

1951 Australian federal election: Ryan
Party	Candidate	Votes	%	±%
Liberal	Nigel Drury	26,021	60.9	+0.6
Labor	Frank Luton	16,733	39.1	−0.6
Total formal votes		42,754	98.2	
Informal votes		783	1.2	
Turnout		43,537	93.6	
Liberal hold		Swing	+0.6	

=== Wide Bay ===
This section is an excerpt from Electoral results for the Division of Wide Bay § 1951

1951 Australian federal election: Wide Bay
Party	Candidate	Votes	%	±%
Country	Bernard Corser	22,895	56.9	+0.4
Labor	Thomas Wallace	17,337	43.1	+15.1
Total formal votes		40,232	98.5	
Informal votes		594	1.5	
Turnout		40,826	97.1	
Country hold		Swing	−7.4	

== South Australia ==
1951 Australian federal election (South Australia)
← 1949	28 April 1951	1954 →

All 10 SA seats in the House of Representatives 5 seats needed for a majority
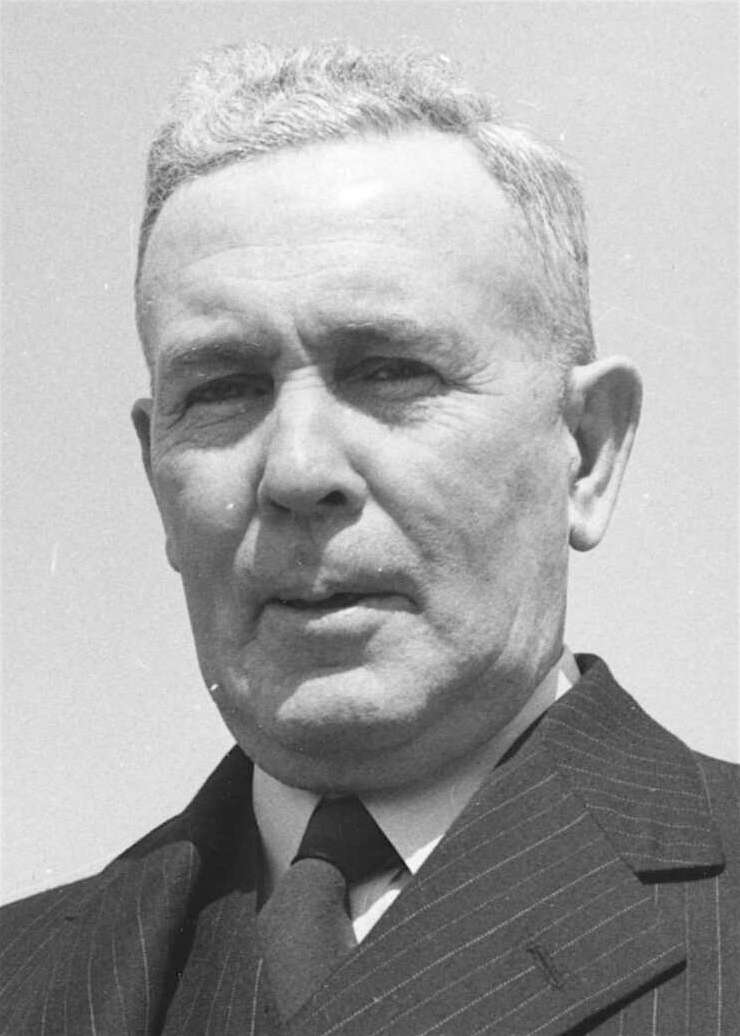

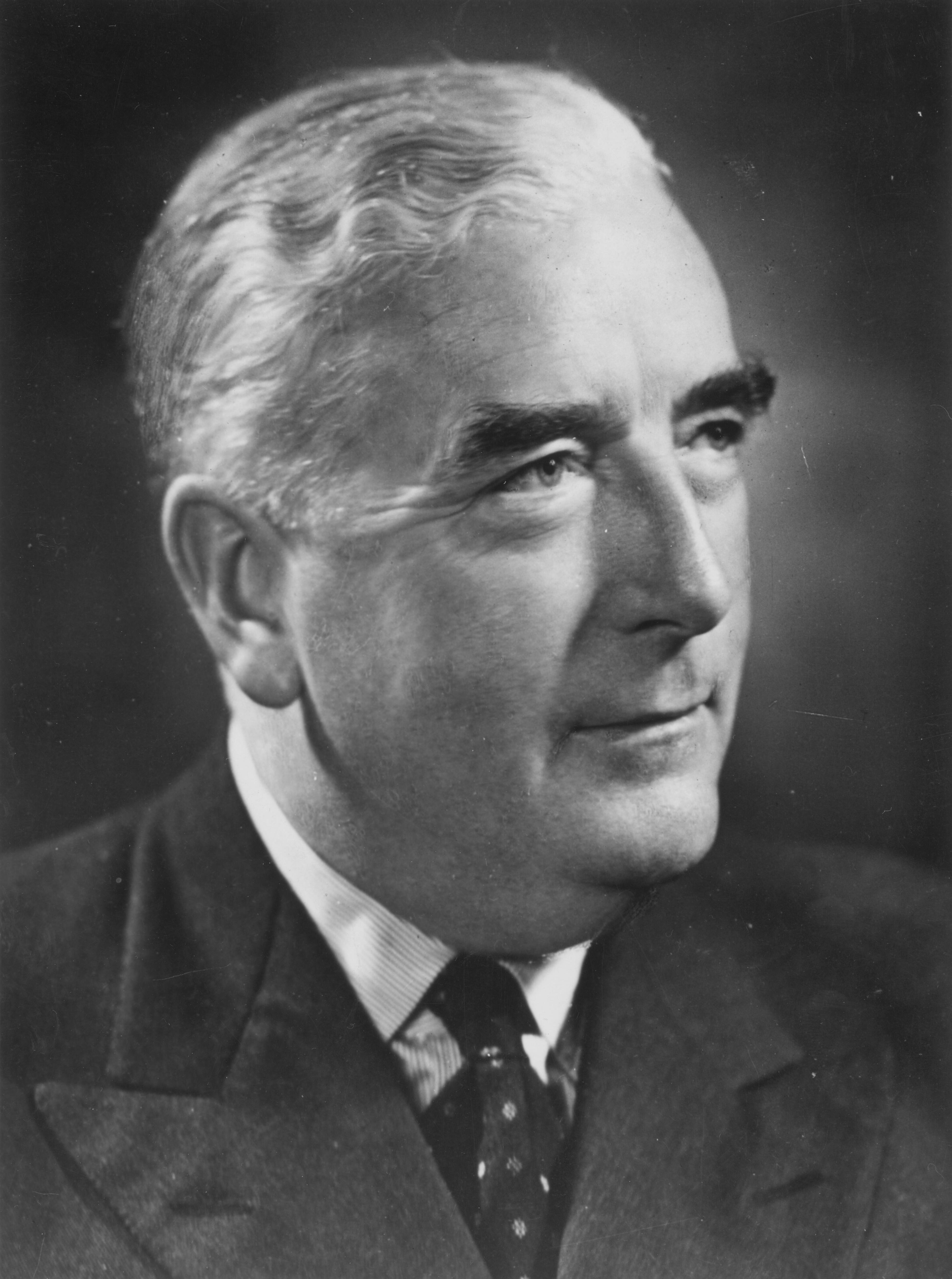
	First party	Second party
Leader	Ben Chifley	Robert Menzies
Party	Labor	Coalition
Seats before	4	6
Seats won	5	5
Seat change	▲1	▼1
TPP	51.8%	48.2%
TPP swing	▲1.2pp	▼1.2pp

- The first-preference vote is not shown due to the fact that one Labor seat was uncontested, therefore the Labor vote is understated.

=== Adelaide ===
This section is an excerpt from Electoral results for the Division of Adelaide § 1951

1951 Australian federal election: Adelaide
Party	Candidate	Votes	%	±%
Labor	Cyril Chambers	22,938	59.8	+0.0
Liberal	Thomas Phillips	14,670	38.3	+1.1
Communist	Edward Robertson	732	1.9	+0.0
Total formal votes		38,340	97.3	
Informal votes		1,076	2.7	
Turnout		39,416	97.2	
Two-party-preferred result
Labor	Cyril Chambers		61.6	−0.4
Liberal	Thomas Phillips		38.4	+0.4
Labor hold		Swing	−0.4	

=== Angas ===
This section is an excerpt from Electoral results for the Division of Angas (1949–1977) § 1949

1951 Australian federal election: Angas
Party	Candidate	Votes	%	±%
Liberal	Alick Downer	25,323	63.9	+3.1
Labor	John Edwards	14,324	36.1	+1.6
Total formal votes		39,647	97.9	
Informal votes		863	2.1	
Turnout		40,510	97.1	
Liberal hold		Swing	+0.8	

=== Barker ===
This section is an excerpt from Electoral results for the Division of Barker § 1951

1951 Australian federal election: Barker
Party	Candidate	Votes	%	±%
Liberal	Archie Cameron	25,256	61.4	−3.1
Labor	Jim Corcoran	14,880	36.2	+3.1
Independent	Charles Lloyd	528	1.3	+1.3
Independent	Frank Rieck	481	1.2	+1.2
Total formal votes		41,145	98.1	
Informal votes		794	1.9	
Turnout		41,939	97.5	
Two-party-preferred result
Liberal	Archie Cameron		62.7	−3.1
Labor	Jim Corcoran		37.3	+3.1
Liberal hold		Swing	−3.1	

=== Boothby ===
This section is an excerpt from Electoral results for the Division of Boothby § 1951

1951 Australian federal election: Boothby
Party	Candidate	Votes	%	±%
Liberal	John McLeay	24,644	61.1	−0.2
Labor	Len Wright	15,714	38.9	+0.2
Total formal votes		40,358	98.1	
Informal votes		786	1.9	
Turnout		41,144	96.9	
Liberal hold		Swing	−0.2	

=== Grey ===
This section is an excerpt from Electoral results for the Division of Grey § 1951

1951 Australian federal election: Grey
Party	Candidate	Votes	%	±%
Labor	Edgar Russell	21,384	56.1	+1.7
Liberal	Edward Andrews	16,749	43.9	−1.7
Total formal votes		38,133	98.4	
Informal votes		616	1.6	
Turnout		38,749	96.3	
Labor hold		Swing	+1.7	

=== Hindmarsh ===
This section is an excerpt from Electoral results for the Division of Hindmarsh § 1951

1951 Australian federal election: Hindmarsh
Party	Candidate	Votes	%	±%
Labor	Clyde Cameron	unopposed		
Labor hold		Swing		

=== Kingston ===
This section is an excerpt from Electoral results for the Division of Kingston § 1951

1951 Australian federal election: Kingston
Party	Candidate	Votes	%	±%
Labor	Pat Galvin	24,834	50.6	+2.2
Liberal	Jim Handby	23,614	48.1	−0.3
Communist	Eric Stead	654	1.3	+1.3
Total formal votes		49,102	98.1	
Informal votes		966	1.9	
Turnout		50,068	97.2	
Two-party-preferred result
Labor	Pat Galvin		51.8	+3.4
Liberal	Jim Handby		48.2	−3.4
Labor gain from Liberal		Swing	+3.4	

=== Port Adelaide ===
This section is an excerpt from Electoral results for the Division of Port Adelaide § 1951

1951 Australian federal election: Port Adelaide
Party	Candidate	Votes	%	±%
Labor	Albert Thompson	33,979	71.3	−0.2
Liberal	John Caskey	12,342	25.9	−0.6
Communist	Alan Finger	1,304	2.7	+0.7
Total formal votes		47,625	97.7	
Informal votes		1,129	2.3	
Turnout		48,754	96.6	
Two-party-preferred result
Labor	Albert Thompson		73.8	+0.5
Liberal	John Caskey		26.2	−0.5
Labor hold		Swing	+0.5	

=== Sturt ===
This section is an excerpt from Electoral results for the Division of Sturt § 1951

1951 Australian federal election: Sturt
Party	Candidate	Votes	%	±%
Liberal	Keith Wilson	22,599	52.4	+1.6
Labor	Leslie McMullin	20,554	47.6	+2.4
Total formal votes		43,153	97.7	
Informal votes		1,038	2.3	
Turnout		44,191	97.3	
Liberal hold		Swing	−0.4	

=== Wakefield ===
This section is an excerpt from Electoral results for the Division of Wakefield § 1951

1951 Australian federal election: Wakefield
Party	Candidate	Votes	%	±%
Liberal	Philip McBride	23,232	60.1	−1.3
Labor	Cyril Hasse	15,437	39.9	+1.3
Total formal votes		38,669	98.4	
Informal votes		642	1.6	
Turnout		39,311	97.7	
Liberal hold		Swing	−1.3	

== Western Australia ==
1951 Australian federal election (Western Australia)
← 1949	28 April 1951	1954 →

All 8 WA seats in the House of Representatives 4 seats needed for a majority
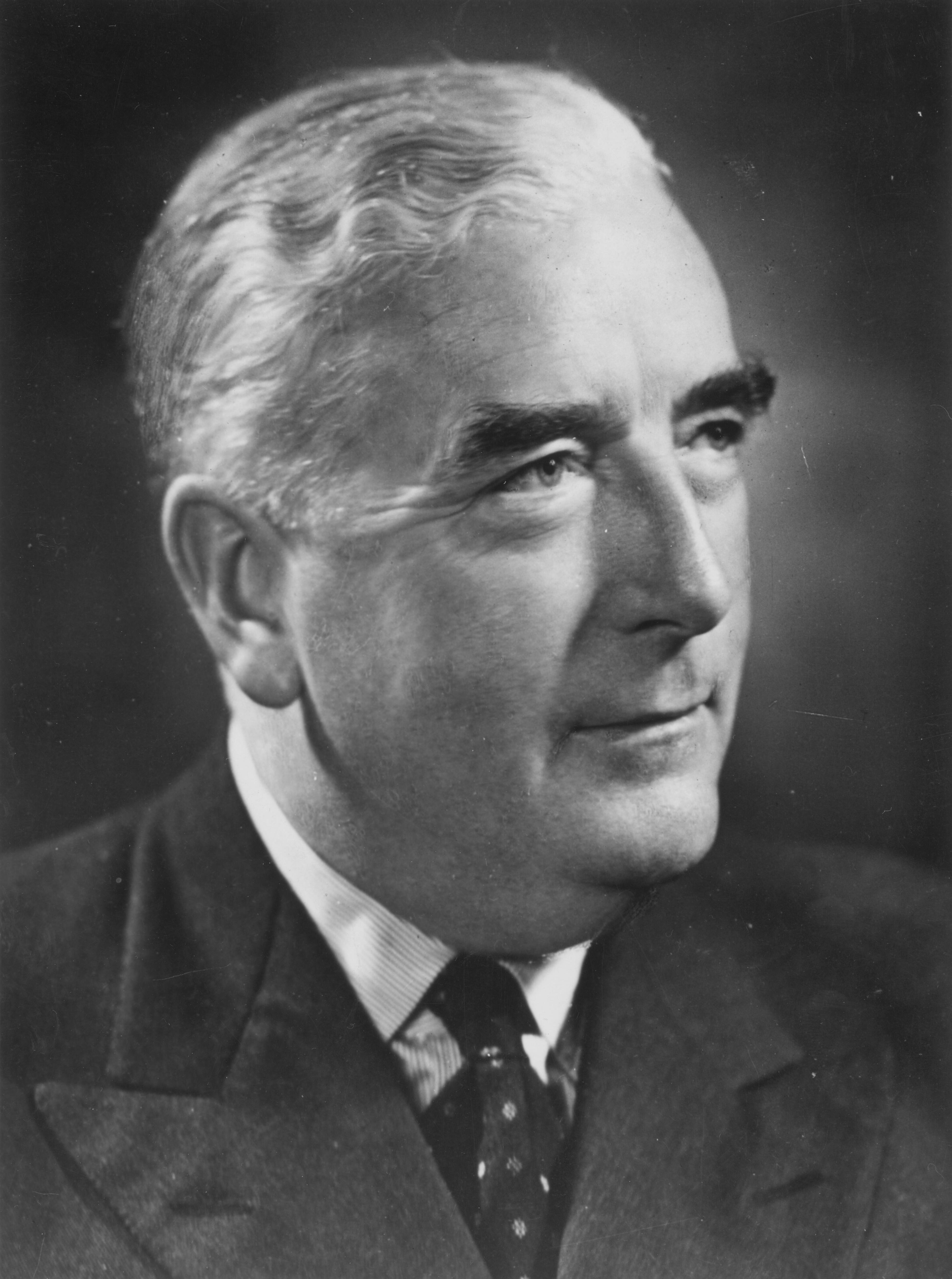

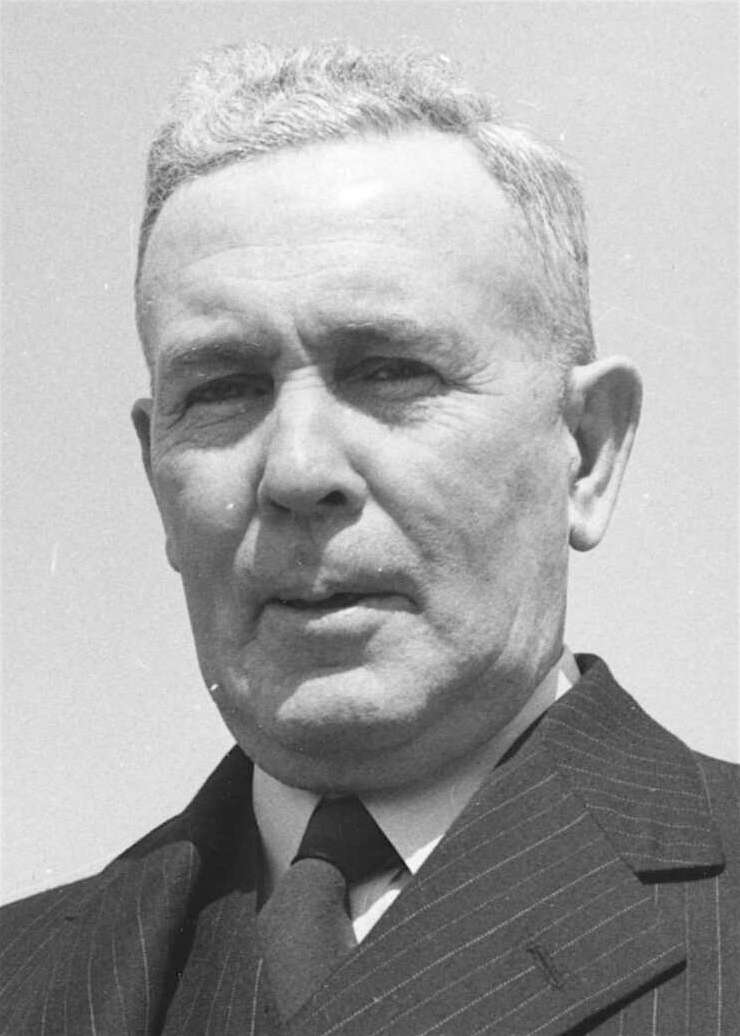
	First party	Second party
Leader	Robert Menzies	Ben Chifley
Party	Coalition	Labor
Seats before	5	3
Seats won	5	3
Seat change	Steady	Steady
Popular vote	150,532	116,573
Percentage	56.0%	43.3%
Swing	▲2.8pp	▼2.1pp
TPP	54.4%	45.6%
TPP swing	▲1.4pp	▼1.4pp

=== Canning ===
This section is an excerpt from Electoral results for the Division of Canning § 1951

1951 Australian federal election: Canning
Party	Candidate	Votes	%	±%
Country	Len Hamilton	22,012	64.6	+27.8
Labor	Percy Munday	12,057	35.4	+5.1
Total formal votes		34,069	97.1	
Informal votes		1,018	2.9	
Turnout		35,087	96.0	
Country hold		Swing	+11.1	

=== Curtin ===
This section is an excerpt from Electoral results for the Division of Curtin § 1951

1951 Australian federal election: Curtin
Party	Candidate	Votes	%	±%
Liberal	Paul Hasluck	25,998	64.7	+3.5
Labor	John Henshaw	14,193	35.3	−3.5
Total formal votes		40,191	97.9	
Informal votes		863	2.1	
Turnout		41,054	96.0	
Liberal hold		Swing	+3.5	

=== Forrest ===
This section is an excerpt from Electoral results for the Division of Forrest § 1951

1951 Australian federal election: Forrest
Party	Candidate	Votes	%	±%
Liberal	Gordon Freeth	22,287	59.5	+32.5
Labor	Frederick O'Connor	15,171	40.5	−3.3
Total formal votes		37,458	97.7	
Informal votes		868	2.3	
Turnout		38,326	97.0	
Liberal hold		Swing	+6.7	

=== Fremantle ===
This section is an excerpt from Electoral results for the Division of Fremantle § 1951

1951 Australian federal election: Fremantle
Party	Candidate	Votes	%	±%
Labor	Kim Beazley Sr.	23,901	56.7	+2.0
Liberal	Len Seaton	18,273	43.3	−0.3
Total formal votes		42,174	97.8	
Informal votes		960	2.2	
Turnout		43,134	97.1	
Labor hold		Swing	+0.5	

=== Kalgoorlie ===
This section is an excerpt from Electoral results for the Division of Kalgoorlie § 1951

1951 Australian federal election: Kalgoorlie
Party	Candidate	Votes	%	±%
Labor	Herbert Johnson	unopposed		
Labor hold		Swing		

=== Moore ===
This section is an excerpt from Electoral results for the Division of Moore § 1951

1951 Australian federal election: Moore
Party	Candidate	Votes	%	±%
Country	Hugh Leslie	19,921	59.6	+21.8
Labor	Arthur Hunter	13,492	40.4	+2.4
Total formal votes		33,413	96.8	
Informal votes		1,099	3.2	
Turnout		34,512	95.2	
Country hold		Swing	+0.6	

=== Perth ===
This section is an excerpt from Electoral results for the Division of Perth § 1951

1951 Australian federal election: Perth
Party	Candidate	Votes	%	±%
Liberal	Billy Snedden	17,705	49.5	+3.1
Labor	Tom Burke	17,501	49.0	+1.2
Communist	James Kelly	532	1.5	+0.2
Total formal votes		35,738	97.4	
Informal votes		965	2.6	
Turnout		36,703	94.6	
Two-party-preferred result
Labor	Tom Burke	17,926	50.2	+0.1
Liberal	Billy Snedden	17,812	49.8	−0.1
Labor hold		Swing	+0.1	

=== Swan ===
This section is an excerpt from Electoral results for the Division of Swan § 1951

1951 Australian federal election: Swan
Party	Candidate	Votes	%	±%
Liberal	Bill Grayden	24,336	53.0	+0.6
Labor	Harry Webb	20,258	44.2	−3.4
Communist	Alex Jolly	1,280	2.8	+2.8
Total formal votes		45,874	97.5	
Informal votes		1,155	2.5	
Turnout		47,029	95.8	
Two-party-preferred result
Liberal	Bill Grayden		53.3	+0.9
Labor	Harry Webb		46.7	−0.9
Liberal hold		Swing	+0.9	

== Tasmania ==
1951 Australian federal election (Tasmania)
← 1949	28 April 1951	1954 →

All 5 Tasmanian seats in the House of Representatives 3 seats needed for a majority
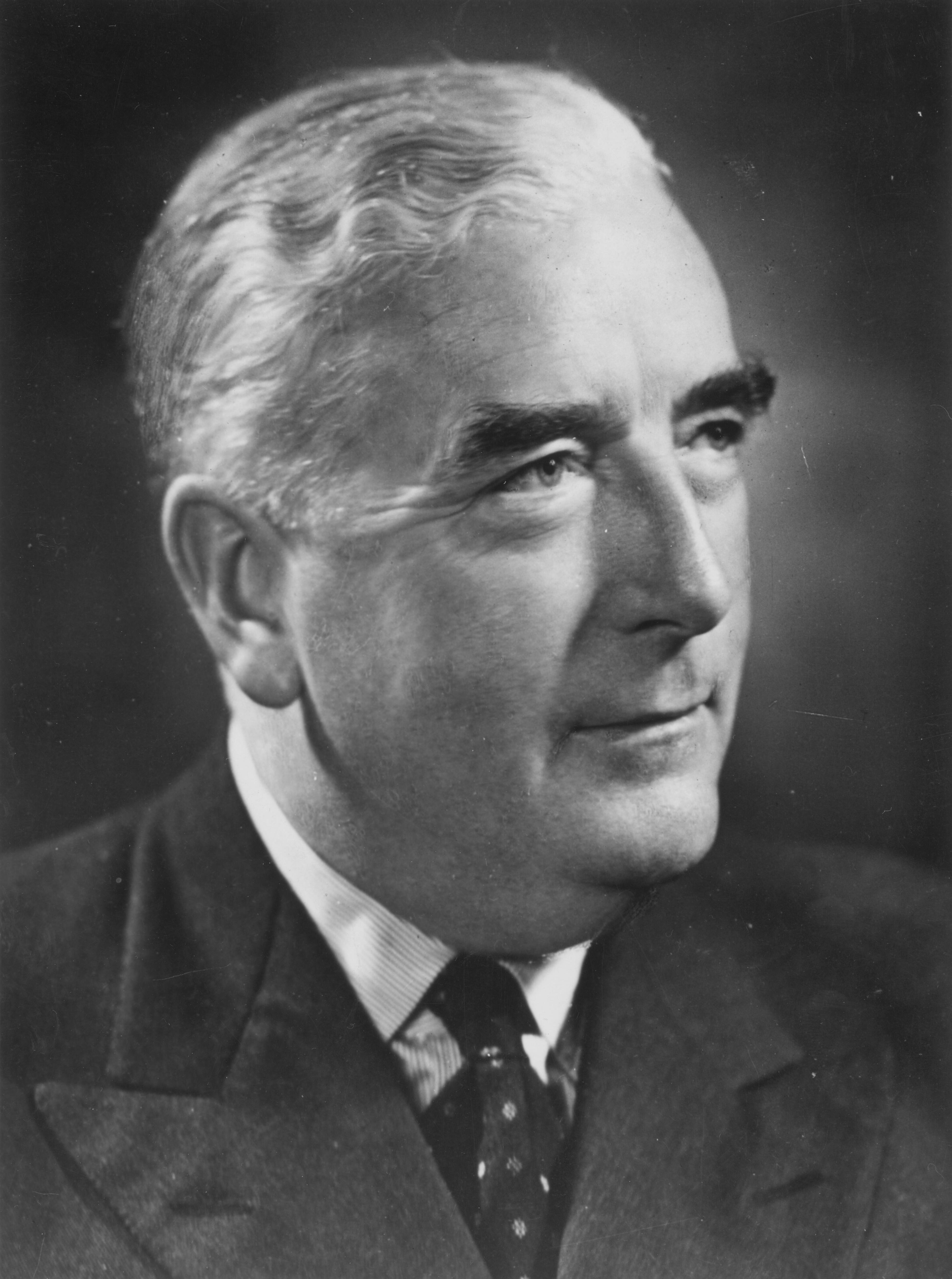

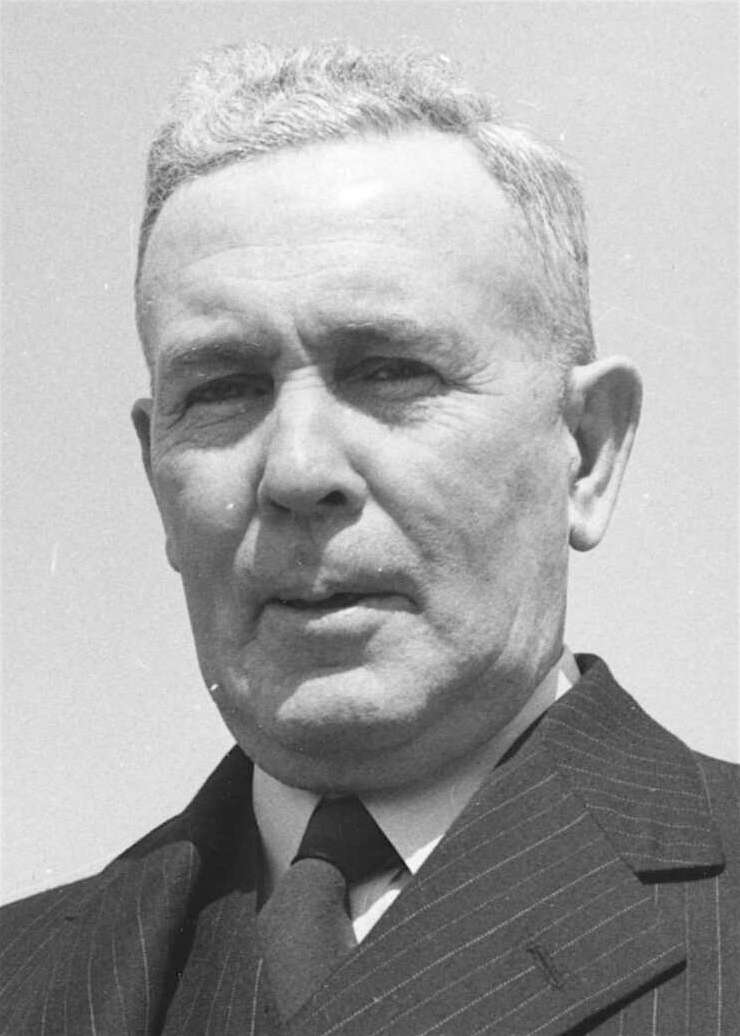
	First party	Second party
Leader	Robert Menzies	Ben Chifley
Party	Coalition	Labor
Seats before	4	1
Seats won	4	1
Seat change	Steady	Steady
Popular vote	79,514	74,088
Percentage	51.8%	48.2%
Swing	▼1.7pp	▲1.7pp
TPP	52.6%	47.4%
TPP swing	▼0.9pp	▲0.9pp

=== Bass ===
This section is an excerpt from Electoral results for the Division of Bass § 1951

1951 Australian federal election: Bass
Party	Candidate	Votes	%	±%
Liberal	Bruce Kekwick	16,469	53.4	+2.8
Labor	Colman O'Byrne	14,346	46.6	−2.8
Total formal votes		30,815	96.4	
Informal votes		1,137	3.6	
Turnout		31,952	96.8	
Liberal hold		Swing	+2.8	

=== Darwin ===
This section is an excerpt from Electoral results for the Division of Darwin § 1951

1951 Australian federal election: Darwin
Party	Candidate	Votes	%	±%
Liberal	Aubrey Luck	14,819	49.7	−6.9
Labor	Max Poulter	9,820	32.9	+6.9
Labor	Clem Foster	5,171	17.3	+17.3
Total formal votes		29,810	97.3	
Informal votes		822	2.7	
Turnout		30,632	97.3	
Two-party-preferred result
Liberal	Aubrey Luck	16,103	54.0	−2.6
Labor	Max Poulter	13,707	46.0	+2.6
Liberal hold		Swing	−2.6	

=== Denison ===
This section is an excerpt from Electoral results for the Division of Denison § 1951

1951 Australian federal election: Denison
Party	Candidate	Votes	%	±%
Liberal	Athol Townley	15,449	53.3	−1.8
Labor	Mervyn McNeair	13,545	46.7	+1.8
Total formal votes		28,994	96.7	
Informal votes		1,001	3.3	
Turnout		29,995	96.1	
Liberal hold		Swing	−1.8	

=== Franklin ===
This section is an excerpt from Electoral results for the Division of Franklin § 1951

1951 Australian federal election: Franklin
Party	Candidate	Votes	%	±%
Liberal	Bill Falkinder	17,983	55.4	−2.6
Labor	Jack Frost	14,460	44.6	+2.6
Total formal votes		32,443	97.8	
Informal votes		934	2.8	
Turnout		33,377	97.0	
Liberal hold		Swing	−2.6	

=== Wilmot ===
This section is an excerpt from Electoral results for the Division of Wilmot § 1951

1951 Australian federal election: Wilmot
Party	Candidate	Votes	%	±%
Labor	Gil Duthie	16,746	53.1	+0.5
Liberal	Lionel Browning	14,794	46.9	−0.5
Total formal votes		31,540	96.7	
Informal votes		1,072	3.3	
Turnout		32,612	96.1	
Labor hold		Swing	+0.5	

== Territories ==
=== Australian Capital Territory ===
1951 Australian federal election (Australian Capital Territory)
← 1949	28 April 1951	1954 →

Division of Australian Capital Territory
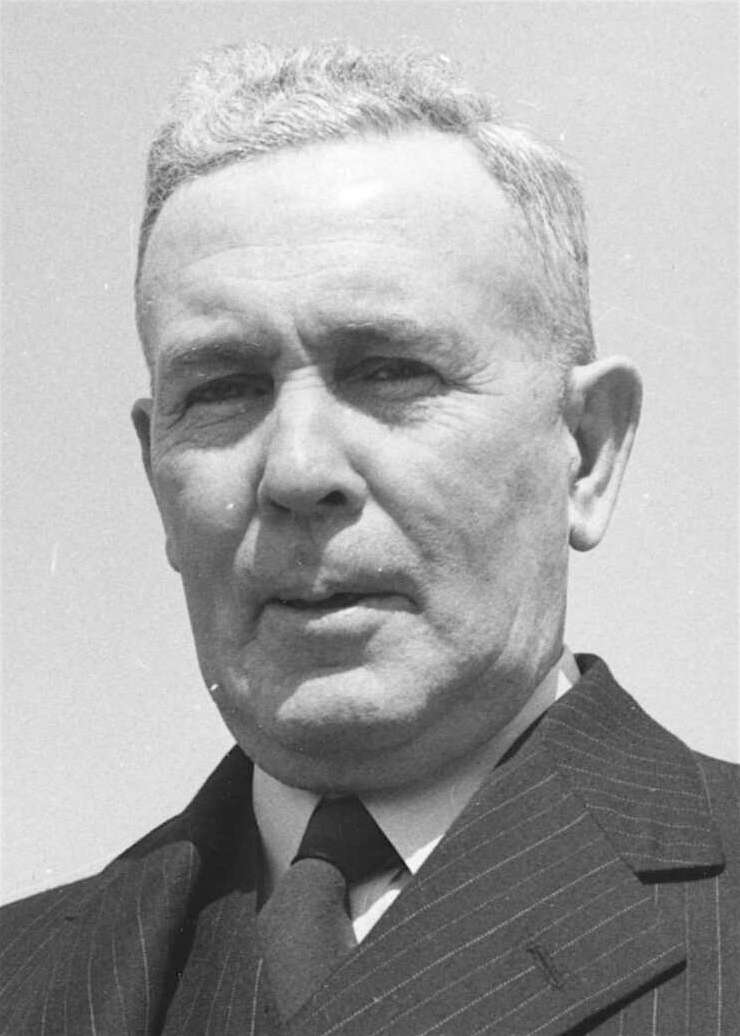

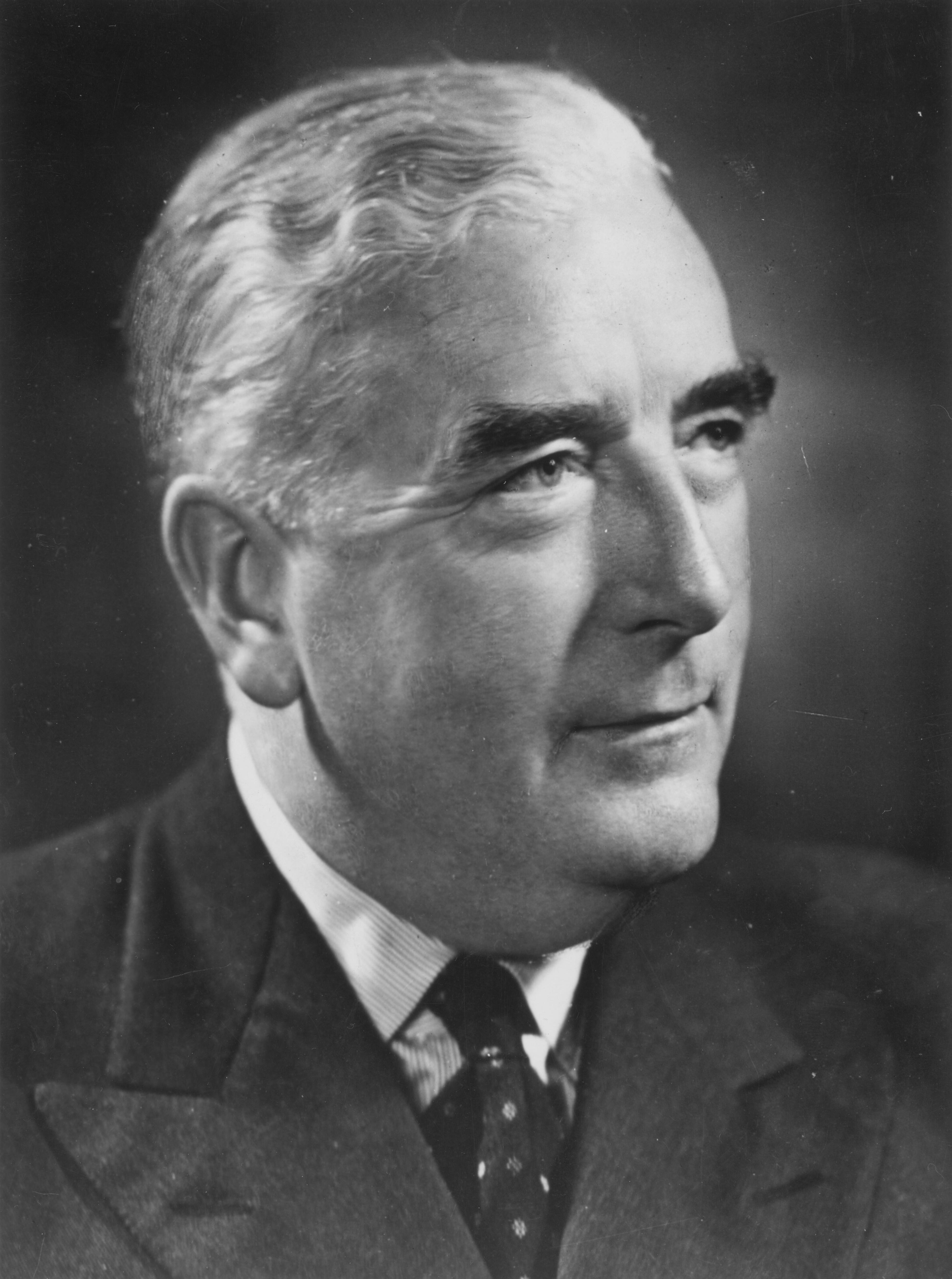
	First party	Second party
Leader	Ben Chifley	Robert Menzies
Party	Labor	Coalition
Seats before	0	0
Seats won	1	0
Seat change	▲1	Steady
Popular vote	5,905	2,287
Percentage	49.9%	19.3%
Swing	▲6.7pp	▼3.2pp
TPP	52.9%	—
TPP swing	▲6.7pp	Steady

This section is an excerpt from Electoral results for the Division of Australian Capital Territory § 1951

1951 Australian federal election: Australian Capital Territory
Party	Candidate	Votes	%	±%
Labor	Jim Fraser	5,905	49.9	+6.7
Independent	Lewis Nott	3,265	27.6	−3.5
Liberal	Clyde Greenwood	2,287	19.3	−3.2
Independent	Jessie Ashton	373	3.2	−0.1
Total formal votes		11,830	99.4	
Informal votes		69	0.6	
Turnout		11,899	93.2	
Two-party-preferred result
Labor	Jim Fraser		52.9	+6.7
Independent	Lewis Nott		47.1	−6.7
Labor gain from Independent		Swing	+6.7	

=== Northern Territory ===
1951 Australian federal election (Northern Territory)
← 1949	28 April 1951	1954 →

Division of Northern Territory
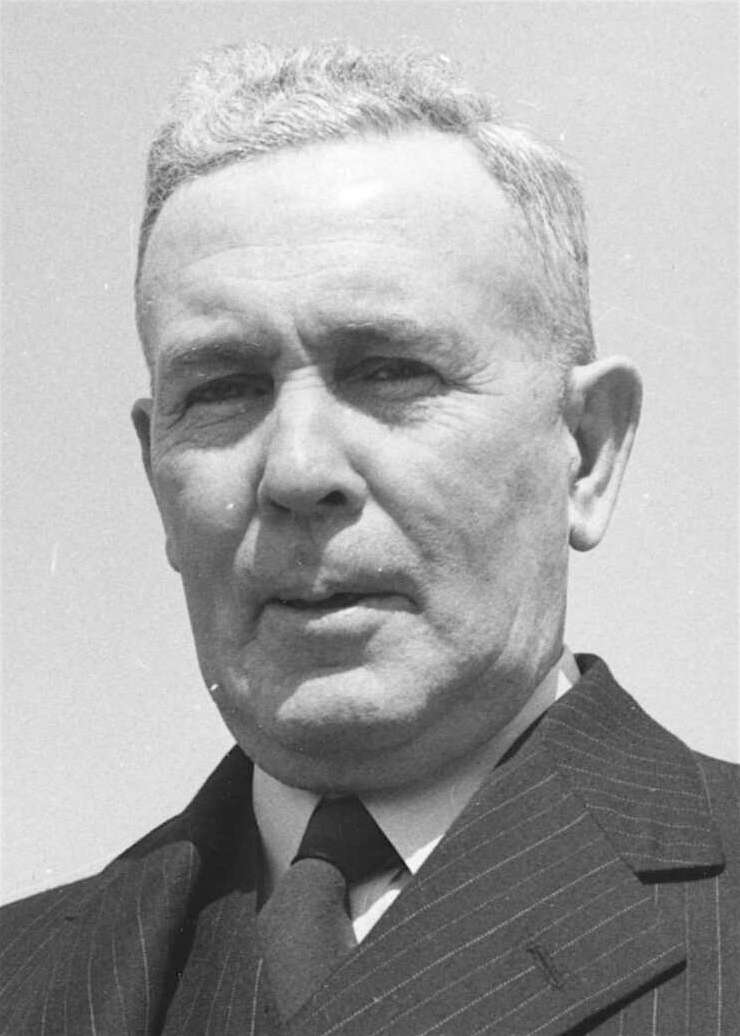

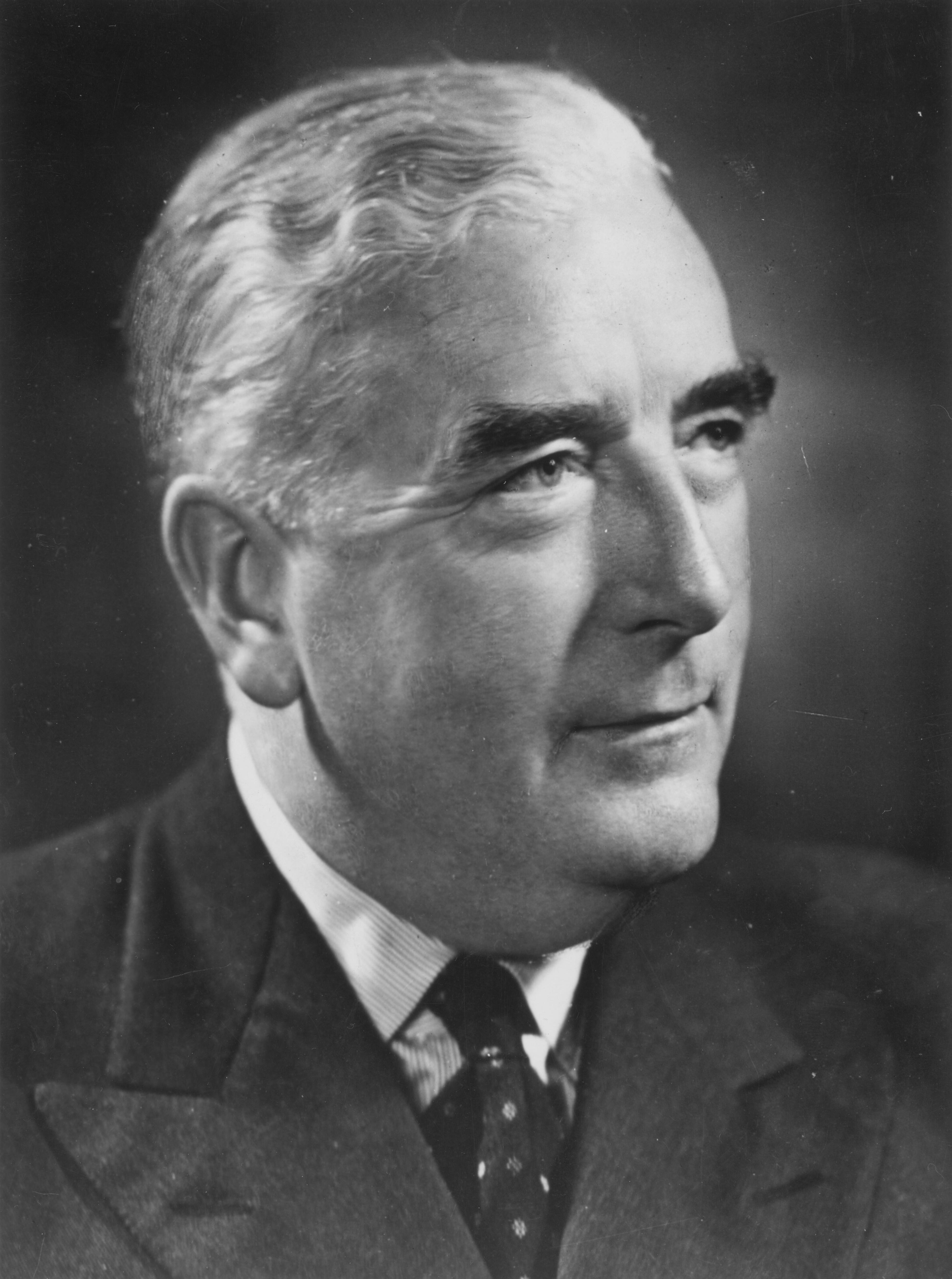
	First party	Second party
Leader	Ben Chifley	Robert Menzies
Party	Labor	Coalition
Seats before	1	0
Seats won	1	0
Seat change	Steady	Steady
Popular vote	3,213	1,085
Percentage	64.1%	21.6%
Swing	▲19.8pp	▲21.6pp
TPP	71.3%	28.7%
TPP swing	▲18.6pp	▲28.7pp

This section is an excerpt from Electoral results for the Division of Northern Territory § 1951

1951 Australian federal election: Northern Territory
Party	Candidate	Votes	%	±%
Labor	Jock Nelson	3,213	64.1	+19.8
Country	Ralph Edwards	1,085	21.6	+21.6
Independent	Jessie Litchfield	717	14.3	+14.3
Total formal votes		5,015	98.1	
Informal votes		95	1.9	
Turnout		5,110	78.4	
Two-party-preferred result
Labor	Jock Nelson		71.3	+18.6
Country	Ralph Edwards		28.7	+28.7
Labor hold		Swing	+18.6	

== See also ==
- Candidates of the 1951 Australian federal election
- Members of the Australian House of Representatives, 1951–1954
