= Electoral results for the Division of Lawson =

Australian division election results

This is a list of electoral results for the Division of Lawson in Australian federal elections from the division's creation in 1949 until its abolition in 1969.

== Members ==
| Member | Party | Term |
|---|---|---|
| Laurie Failes | Country | 1949–1969 |

== Election results ==
=== Elections in the 1960s ===
==== 1966 ====
1966 Australian federal election: Lawson
| Party | Candidate | Votes | % | ±% |
|---|---|---|---|---|
| Country | Laurie Failes | 21,649 | 56.5 | +3.5 |
| Labor | John Canobi | 14,399 | 37.6 | −4.4 |
| Democratic Labor | Mario Morandini | 2,239 | 5.8 | +0.8 |
| Total formal votes | | 38,287 | 98.3 | |
| Informal votes | | 668 | 1.7 | |
| Turnout | | 38,955 | 95.3 | |
Two-party-preferred result
| Country | Laurie Failes | | 61.1 | +2.6 |
| Labor | John Canobi | | 38.9 | −2.6 |
| Country hold | | Swing | +2.6 | |

==== 1963 ====
1963 Australian federal election: Lawson
| Party | Candidate | Votes | % | ±% |
|---|---|---|---|---|
| Country | Laurie Failes | 20,991 | 53.0 | +5.1 |
| Labor | John Canobi | 16,659 | 42.0 | −4.4 |
| Democratic Labor | Mario Morandini | 1,972 | 5.0 | −0.7 |
| Total formal votes | | 39,622 | 99.2 | |
| Informal votes | | 319 | 0.8 | |
| Turnout | | 39,941 | 95.5 | |
Two-party-preferred result
| Country | Laurie Failes | | 57.0 | +4.9 |
| Labor | John Canobi | | 43.0 | −4.9 |
| Country hold | | Swing | +4.9 | |

==== 1961 ====
1961 Australian federal election: Lawson
| Party | Candidate | Votes | % | ±% |
|---|---|---|---|---|
| Country | Laurie Failes | 18,750 | 47.9 | −1.8 |
| Labor | John Canobi | 18,156 | 46.4 | +4.1 |
| Democratic Labor | Denis Searls | 2,239 | 5.7 | −2.3 |
| Total formal votes | | 39,145 | 98.4 | |
| Informal votes | | 635 | 1.6 | |
| Turnout | | 39,780 | 95.6 | |
Two-party-preferred result
| Country | Laurie Failes | 20,392 | 52.1 | −3.9 |
| Labor | John Canobi | 18,753 | 47.9 | +3.9 |
| Country hold | | Swing | −3.9 | |

=== Elections in the 1950s ===
==== 1958 ====
1958 Australian federal election: Lawson
| Party | Candidate | Votes | % | ±% |
|---|---|---|---|---|
| Country | Laurie Failes | 19,237 | 49.7 | −7.0 |
| Labor | Jack Tully | 16,367 | 42.3 | −1.0 |
| Democratic Labor | Edward English | 3,080 | 8.0 | +8.0 |
| Total formal votes | | 38,684 | 98.2 | |
| Informal votes | | 712 | 1.8 | |
| Turnout | | 39,396 | 95.5 | |
Two-party-preferred result
| Country | Laurie Failes | 21,675 | 56.0 | −0.7 |
| Labor | Jack Tully | 17,009 | 44.0 | +0.7 |
| Country hold | | Swing | −0.7 | |

==== 1955 ====
1955 Australian federal election: Lawson
| Party | Candidate | Votes | % | ±% |
|---|---|---|---|---|
| Country | Laurie Failes | 22,030 | 56.7 | +7.1 |
| Labor | Jack Williamson | 16,845 | 43.3 | −7.1 |
| Total formal votes | | 38,875 | 98.1 | |
| Informal votes | | 745 | 1.9 | |
| Turnout | | 39,620 | 95.7 | |
| Country gain from Labor | | Swing | +7.1 | |

==== 1954 ====
1954 Australian federal election: Lawson
| Party | Candidate | Votes | % | ±% |
|---|---|---|---|---|
| Labor | Alan Manning | 18,998 | 48.9 | +1.9 |
| Country | Laurie Failes | 18,497 | 47.6 | −5.4 |
| Independent | Dick Bourke | 1,373 | 3.5 | +3.5 |
| Total formal votes | | 38,868 | 99.3 | |
| Informal votes | | 289 | 0.7 | |
| Turnout | | 39,157 | 96.4 | |
Two-party-preferred result
| Country | Laurie Failes | 19,565 | 50.3 | −2.7 |
| Labor | Alan Manning | 19,303 | 49.7 | +2.7 |
| Country hold | | Swing | −2.7 | |

==== 1951 ====
1951 Australian federal election: Lawson
| Party | Candidate | Votes | % | ±% |
|---|---|---|---|---|
| Country | Laurie Failes | 19,819 | 53.0 | +22.0 |
| Labor | Alan Manning | 17,570 | 47.0 | +4.0 |
| Total formal votes | | 37,389 | 98.4 | |
| Informal votes | | 607 | 1.6 | |
| Turnout | | 37,996 | 96.3 | |
| Country hold | | Swing | −2.8 | |

=== Elections in the 1940s ===
==== 1949 ====
1949 Australian federal election: Lawson
| Party | Candidate | Votes | % | ±% |
|---|---|---|---|---|
| Labor | Alan Manning | 15,969 | 43.0 | −3.9 |
| Country | Laurie Failes | 11,531 | 31.0 | −4.3 |
| Liberal | Elwyn Croft | 9,249 | 24.9 | +18.6 |
| Independent | William Ferguson | 392 | 1.1 | +1.1 |
| Total formal votes | | 37,141 | 98.7 | |
| Informal votes | | 476 | 1.3 | |
| Turnout | | 37,617 | 96.6 | |
Two-party-preferred result
| Country | Laurie Failes | 20,773 | 55.8 | +7.6 |
| Labor | Alan Manning | 16,408 | 44.2 | −7.6 |
| Country notional gain from Labor | | Swing | +7.6 | |
