= Eileen Powell =

- Born: 3 August 1913
- Died: 19 July 1997 (aged 83)
- Citizenship: Australia
- Occupation: Women's Activist

Eileen Louisa Powell (3 August 1913 – 19 July 1997) was an Australian trade unionist and women's activist. She was New South Wales' first female industrial advocate.

She joined the Australian Labor Party as a teenager in 1928, becoming assistant secretary of the party's Stanmore branch in 1929. She worked as a shop assistant at Grace Bros on Broadway before becoming a journalist with the Labor Daily. She worked for Labor Head Office from 1929 to 1936. Powell was employed by the Australian Railways Union (ARU) from 1937, working as de facto editor of the journal, the Railroad. In 1938, the ARU took the Department of Railways to the Conciliation Commissioner, based largely on Powell's findings during research on the railway refreshment rooms offered for female employees. The commissioner awarded the women a small pay increase but did not address the major issues of the case.

During World War II, Powell worked for the Commonwealth Department of Labour and National Service. Women were at that time performing many jobs on the home front, and Powell was instrumental in the creation of the Industrial Welfare Division to oversee that process. She then returned to the ARU, hosting a popular daily radio session on Radio 2KY (1944–52). She was then appointed as Australia's correspondent of the International Labor Organisation Committee of Experts on Women's Work by the Curtin government, on the recommendation of Albert Monk, president of the Australian Council of Trade Unions. In 1948, she married Fred Coleman-Browne, a journalist with the Sydney Morning Herald.

Powell ran unsuccessfully as the Labor candidate for North Sydney at the 1951 federal election. She later gave evidence at the National Wage Case in 1969, which adopted equal pay for equal work, and was awarded the Silver Jubilee Medal in 1977. Powell died in 1997.
