= Laurie Failes =

Australian politician (1899–1976)

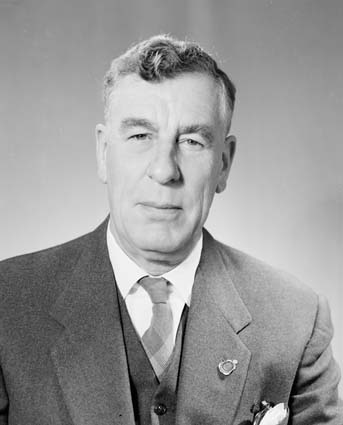

Member of the Australian Parliament for Lawson
- In office 10 December 1949 – 29 September 1969
- Preceded by: New seat
- Succeeded by: Seat abolished

Personal details
- Born: 6 October 1899 Coonabarabran, New South Wales
- Died: 7 July 1976 (aged 76)
- Party: Australian Country Party
- Occupation: Farmer, businessman

Laurence John Failes (6 October 1899 – 7 July 1976) was an Australian politician. Born in Coonabarabran, New South Wales, he attended state schools and then Hawkesbury Agricultural College before becoming a farmer at Bugaldie and then a businessman at Coonabarabran. He served in World War II 1942–45.

In 1949, he was elected to the Australian House of Representatives as the Country Party member for Lawson. He was a member of the Joint Parliamentary Committee on Foreign Affairs, the House Committee and the Select Committee on the House of Representatives Accommodation.

He held Lawson until its abolition in 1969, at which time he retired. Failes died in 1976.

Parliament of Australia
Preceded by New seat	Member for Lawson; 1949 – 1969	Succeeded by Seat abolished
