= Division of Lawson =

Former Australian federal electoral division

Lawson Australian House of Representatives Division
- Created: 1949
- Abolished: 1969
- Namesake: Henry Lawson

The Division of Lawson was an Australian Electoral Division in the state of New South Wales. It was located in the north-west of the state, and included the towns of Coonabarabran, Dubbo and Mudgee.

The Division was named for Federation era Australian author Henry Lawson. It was proclaimed at the redistribution of 11 May 1949, and was first contested at the 1949 federal election. It was abolished at the redistribution of 21 November 1968.

== Members ==
Image	Member	Party	Term	Notes
	Laurie Failes (1899–1976)	Country	10 December 1949 – 29 September 1969	Retired after Lawson was abolished in 1969
