= Lyneham High School =

Location
- Goodwin St; Lyneham; Canberra, Australian Capital Territory, 2602; Australia; 35.252°S 149.131°E

Information
- Type: Co-educational secondary and ACT government school
- Mottoes: Care Quality Creativity, Latin: Vera Semper Colere (Always foster the truth)
- Established: January 1959
- Principal: Jacqui Ford
- Campus: Lyneham
- Colours: Blue and maroon
- Mascot: Lion (Educat)
- Website: www.lynehamhs.act.edu.au

Lyneham High School is a public secondary school in the Australian capital of Canberra that was founded in 1959. Located in the suburb of Lyneham, it is one of the only large public high schools in the immediate area. The school has a performing arts programs which includes concert and jazz bands, performance-based music classes and drama, digital arts and dance classes.

== Enrollment ==
Lyneham high school's exact student count is not publicly available information, although the school has been stated to be well over its student capacity. Most students enrol from the schools Turner Primary School, Majura Primary School, North Ainslie Primary School and Lyneham Primary School. The priority enrolment areas (PEAs) of the school include Acton, Turner, Dickson, Hackett, Downer, O'Connor and Watson, the latter being a shared PEA with Campbell High School.

== Band Program ==
Lyneham High School's band program consists of five concert bands and two jazz bands, as well as several smaller ensembles across school years. The concert bands include the Year 7 Beginner Band, the Year 7 Concert Band, the Year 8 Concert Band, the Year 9 Concert Band, and the Year 10 Concert Band. All of these bands are run as an elective class, and instruments include those from the woodwind, brass, and guitar families. Percussion instruments are also present in the bands. The Jazz bands are extra curricular bands, including the Intermediate Jazz Band and the Senior Jazz Band. Every year, all bands enter the Australian National Eisteddfod, and have won numerous awards from the competition.

Towards the later stages of the year, Year 10 students are offered places in the Ginninderra Wind Orchestra as a means of continuing their musical careers after leaving Lyneham.

== Lyneham Performing Arts Centre ==
In the late 2000s, Lyneham High School received a grant from the A.C.T. Government to build the Lyneham Performing Arts Centre (LPAC). Architects completed the blueprints for the $5.3 million complex, with construction beginning in June 2009. LPAC was completed in March 2010, being opened by Andrew Barr MLA. The centre has hosted numerous musical performances. It was also the venue for the 2010 Australian National Jazz Eisteddfod.

== Enrichment programs ==
=== LEAP ===
Launched in 1983, LEAP (Lyneham Enriched Academic Program), is an academic program designed to allow high school children to enrich their learning in the fields of Maths, Science, Social Studies (HaSS) and English. It provides a foundation for bright students intending to study these subjects at higher levels. The program is selective, with around thirty students being accepted in each year by means of a range of tests determining students' proficiency in each of the four subjects.

The requirements of LEAP are that the students are to sit the Australian Council for Education tests in the subjects of English, Mathematics, and Science.

LEAP students attend two camps aside from other students throughout their schooling at Lyneham High School: one in Year 8, and one in Year 10.

=== SEEK ===
Lyneham once had the "Seek" Program which was an alternate style of learning to the normal curriculum for years 8-10. Students had all core classes but electives the together however Seek was later cancelled in 2026.

=== SEAL ===
The SEAL (Sporting Excellence at Lyneham) program is aimed at athletic students, giving them the opportunity to improve in their chosen sport by attending scheduled training sessions weekly. Meanwhile, the PE system allows SEAL students to catch up on work missed due to attending the specialist sessions.

=== DARE ===
The DARE (Developing Adolescent Resilience and Empathy) boys' program.

=== STAR ===
STAR (Supporting Talent Achievement and Resilience) girls' program.

== Notable alumni ==
- Andrew Barr – Chief Minister of the Australian Capital Territory, since 2014
- Genevieve Bell – Distinguished Professor, Australian National University
- Lauren Boden – Australian representative to the 2012 Olympics in athletics
- Steve Kilbey – lead singer-songwriter and bass guitarist for The Church, an Australian rock band
- Paul Lyneham – Australian journalist in print and on ABCTV, Channel Seven and Channel Nine (Lyneham's surname is simply coincidental with the suburb's/school name: the suburb's name Lyneham was derived from Sir William Lyne's surname.)
- Ben Hardy – Co-captain of the Australian Men's National Volleyball Team. He is currently also serving as the assistant coach for the team.
- Jack Heath – Australian children's, young adult and crime writer
- Meredith Hunter – Leader of the ACT Greens, Legislative Assembly of the Australian Capital Territory, from 2008 to 2012
- Stephen Larkham – Coach of the ACT Brumbies Super Rugby team and former Brumbies and Wallabies (Australian national rugby union team) fly-half
- Garth Nix – Australian writer
- Tim Banks – General Counsel Climate Change Authority
- Edward Bovill - Writer

== See also ==
- List of schools in the Australian Capital Territory
- List of schools in Australia
- Education in the Australian Capital Territory
