= List of schools in the Australian Capital Territory =

This is a list of schools in the Australian Capital Territory (ACT), which houses Australia's capital city, Canberra. The Territory's education system consists of primary schools, which accommodate students from Kindergarten to Year 6, high schools, which accommodate students from Years 7 to 10, and secondary colleges, which are specialist Year 11–12 institutions. As a result of development in newer areas and mergers in existing areas, some schools accommodate more than one of the above year ranges. Certificates are awarded on the basis of continuous assessment of students' progress at the end of years 10 and 12 by the ACT Education Directorate.

While the Jervis Bay Territory is an internal territory of Australia, separate to the ACT, many of its government departments (including education) is managed by the ACT government and has a single primary school.

== Public schools ==
=== Primary schools (K–6) ===
Includes Early Childhood Schools (K–2) and K–10 schools

Name	Suburb	District	Opened	Website	Notes
Ainslie School	Braddon	North Canberra	1927	Website	
Amaroo School	Amaroo	Gungahlin	2004	Website	K–10
Aranda Primary School	Aranda	Belconnen	1969	Website	
Arawang Primary School	Waramanga	Weston Creek	1989	Website	Established following closure of Waramanga PS & Fisher PS
Bonython Primary School	Bonython	Tuggeranong	1992	Website	
Calwell Primary School	Calwell	Tuggeranong	1989	Website	
Campbell Primary School	Campbell	North Canberra	1961	Website	
Caroline Chisholm School	Chisholm	Tuggeranong	1985	Website	6–10
Chapman Primary School	Chapman	Weston Creek	1975	Website	
Charles Conder Primary School	Conder	Tuggeranong	1994	Website	
Charles Weston School	Coombs	Molonglo Valley	2016	Website	
Charnwood-Dunlop School	Charnwood	Belconnen	1975	Website	Formerly Charnwood PS
Curtin Primary School	Curtin	Woden Valley	1983	Website	Established following closure of North Curtin PS & South Curtin PS
Duffy Primary School	Duffy	Weston Creek	1973	Website	
Evatt Primary School	Evatt	Belconnen	1974	Website	
Evelyn Scott School	Deman Prospect	Molonglo Valley	2021	Website	
Fadden Primary School	Fadden	Tuggeranong	1985	Website	
Farrer Primary School	Farrer	Woden Valley	1970	Website	
Florey Primary School	Florey	Belconnen	1989	Website	
Forrest Primary School	Forrest	South Canberra	1958	Website	
Fraser Primary School	Fraser	Belconnen	1979	Website	
Garran Primary School	Garran	Woden Valley	1967	Website	
Gilmore Primary School	Gilmore	Tuggeranong	1987	Website	
Giralang Primary School	Giralang	Belconnen	1977	Website	
Gold Creek School	Nicholls	Gungahlin	1998	Website	K–10
Gordon Primary School	Gordon	Tuggeranong	1993	Website	
Gowrie Primary School	Gowrie	Tuggeranong	1983	Website	
Harrison School	Harrison	Gungahlin	2008	Website	K–10
Hawker Primary School	Hawker	Belconnen	1976	Website	
Hughes Primary School	Hughes	Woden Valley	1964	Website	
Isabella Plains Early Childhood School	Isabella Plains	Tuggeranong	1988	Website	K–2; Formerly PS
Jervis Bay School	Jervis Bay	-	1914	Website	K–6
Kaleen Primary School	Kaleen	Belconnen	1976	Website	
Kingsford Smith School	Holt	Belconnen	2009	Website	
Latham Primary School	Latham	Belconnen	1972	Website	
Lyneham Primary School	Lyneham	North Canberra	1959	Website	
Lyons Early Childhood School	Lyons	Woden Valley	1966	Website	K–2; formerly PS until 2008
Macgregor Primary School	Macgregor	Belconnen	1968	Website	
Macquarie Primary School	Macquarie	Belconnen	1968	Website	
Margaret Hendry School	Taylor	Gungahlin	2019	Website	
Majura Primary School	Watson	North Canberra	1989	Website	Established following closure of Watson PS, Hackett PS and Downer PS
Maribyrnong Primary School	Kaleen	Belconnen	1979	Website	
Mawson Primary School	Mawson	Woden Valley	1968	Website	
Miles Franklin Primary School	Evatt	Belconnen	1980	Website	
Monash Primary School	Monash	Tuggeranong	1982	Website	
Mount Rogers Primary School	Melba	Belconnen	1998	Website	Formed from Melba PS & Spence PS; formerly Mount Rogers Community School
Namadgi School	Kambah	Tuggeranong	2011	Website	K–10
Narrabundah Early Childhood School	Narrabundah	South Canberra	1952	Website	K–2; formerly PS until 2008; Also open 1894–1923
Ngunnawal Primary School	Ngunnawal	Gungahlin	1997	Website	
North Ainslie Primary School	Ainslie	North Canberra	1958	Website	
O'Connor Co-operative School	O'Connor	North Canberra	1978	Website	Early Childhood school (P–2)
Palmerston District Primary School	Palmerston	Gungahlin	1995	Website	K–6
Red Hill School	Red Hill	South Canberra	1960	Website	IB Primary Years Program since 2006
Richardson Primary School	Richardson	Tuggeranong	1984	Website	
Southern Cross Early Childhood School	Scullin	Belconnen	1989	Website	K–2 since 2009; Established as Southern Cross PS following closure of Scullin PS & Page PS
Stromlo High School	Waramanga	Weston Creek	1972	Website	6–10. Formerly Weston Creek HS until 1991
Taylor Primary School	Kambah	Tuggeranong	1978	Website	K-6
Telopea Park School	Barton	South Canberra	1923	Website	K–10. IB Middle Years Program, French Brevet; bilingual French-Australian since 1983
Theodore Primary School	Theodore	Tuggeranong	1991	Website	
Throsby School	Throsby	Gungahlin	2022	Website	
Torrens Primary School	Torrens	Woden Valley	1968	Website	
Turner School	Turner	North Canberra	1953	Website	
Wanniassa School	Wanniassa	Tuggeranong	1981	Website	K–10
Wanniassa Hills Primary School	Wanniassa	Tuggeranong	1978	Website	K–2. Formerly PS until 2009
Weetangera Primary School	Weetangera	Belconnen	1973	Website	
Yarralumla Primary School	Yarralumla	South Canberra	1956	Website	Officially opened in 1957
Strathnairn School	Strathnairn	Belconnen	2026	Website	Opened in 2026 for preschool to year 2 students. Students from year 3 to 6 will commence in 2027.

A new public primary school in the Molonglo region is under development by the ACT Government, to be located in the suburb of Whitlam. The interim name for the school is Whitlam School and is scheduled to open to students in 2027.

=== High schools (7–10) ===
Name	Suburb	District	Opened	Website	Notes
Alfred Deakin High School	Deakin	South Canberra	1989	Website	Established following closure of Deakin HS & Woden Valley HS
Amaroo School	Amaroo	Gungahlin	2004	Website	K–10
Belconnen High School	Hawker	Belconnen	1971	Website	
Calwell High School	Calwell	Tuggeranong	1990	Website	
Campbell High School	Campbell	North Canberra	1965	Website	
Canberra High School	Macquarie	Belconnen	1938	Website	Relocated 1969 from North Canberra
Caroline Chisholm School	Chisholm	Tuggeranong	1985	Website	K–10
Evelyn Scott School	Denman Prospect	Molonglo Valley	2021	Website	P–10
Gold Creek School	Nicholls	Gungahlin	1998	Website	K–10
Harrison School	Harrison	Gungahlin	2008	Website	K–10
Kingsford Smith School	Holt	Belconnen	2009	Website	K–10
Lanyon High School	Conder	Tuggeranong	1996	Website	
Lyneham High School	Lyneham	North Canberra	1959	Website	
Melba Copland Secondary School (High School Campus)	Melba	Belconnen	1976	Website	IB Middle Years Program, Formerly Melba High School; merged in 2009 with Copland College
Melrose High School	Pearce	Woden Valley	1970	Website	
Namadgi School	Kambah	Tuggeranong	2011	Website	K–10
Stromlo High School	Waramanga	Weston Creek	1972	Website	6–10. Formerly Weston Creek HS until 1991
Telopea Park School	Barton	South Canberra	1923	Website	K–10. IB Middle Years Program, French Brevet; bilingual French-Australian since 1984
Wanniassa School	Wanniassa	Tuggeranong	1981	Website	K–10
UC High School, Kaleen	Kaleen	Belconnen	1978	Website	Formerly Kaleen High School
Aunty Agnes Shea High School	Taylor	Gungahlin	2025	Website	Opened to year 7 and 8 students in 2025
Shirley Smith High School	Kenny	Gungahlin	2024	Website	Opened to year 7 students in 2024

=== Secondary colleges (11–12) ===
Name	Suburb	District	Opened	Website	Notes
Canberra College (Weston Campus)	Stirling	Weston Creek	1977	Website	Formerly Stirling College until 1997
Canberra College (Woden Campus)	Phillip	Woden Valley	1976	Website	IB Diploma from 2009 until 2017. Formerly Phillip College until 1997
Dickson College	Dickson	North Canberra	1962	Website	Became College in 1976
Erindale College	Wanniassa	Tuggeranong	1981	Website	
Gungahlin College	Gungahlin	Gungahlin	2011	Website	
Hawker College	Hawker	Belconnen	1976	Website	
Lake Tuggeranong College	Greenway	Tuggeranong	1990	Website	
Melba Copland Secondary School (College Campus)	Melba	Belconnen	1978	Website	IB Diploma; Formerly Copland College; merged in 2009 with Melba High School
Narrabundah College	Narrabundah	South Canberra	1961	Website	IB Diploma, French Baccalaureate. Became College in 1976
UC Senior Secondary College, Lake Ginninderra	Belconnen	Belconnen	1987	Website	Formerly Lake Ginninderra College

A second college in the Gungahlin region is under development by the ACT Government, to be located in the suburb of Nicholls. The college is scheduled for completion by 2030.

=== Other schools, including Specialist Schools and Play Schools ===
Name	Suburb	District	Opened	Website	Notes
Black Mountain School	O'Connor	North Canberra	1954	Website	Specialist school Formerly Koomarri until 2003
Cranleigh School	Holt	Belconnen	1974	Website	Specialist school
German Australian Playschool	Turner	North Canberra	2006	Website	3 to 5 year old children
Inner North Playschool	Ainslie	Canberra	2009	Website	3 to 4 year old children
Koala Playschool	Cook	Belconnen	1990	Website	3 to 4 year old children
Malkara School	Garran	Woden Valley	1970	Website	Specialist school
Turner Early Childhood Centre	Turner	North Canberra	1971		Formerly Hartley Street School
The Woden School	Deakin	South Canberra	1974	Website	Specialist school
Wombats Playschool	Page	Belconnen	1991	Website	A Preschool educational program for 3 to 4 year olds.

=== Closed public schools ===
The list below includes public schools that have closed in the ACT. The last public school closures were in 2008, when Higgins and Holt Primary were amalgamated into the new Kingsford Smith School.

Name	Suburb	District	Opened	Closed	Notes
Acton Primary School	Acton	North Canberra	1920	1923	
Canberra Primary School	City	North Canberra	1880	1914	
Charnwood High School	Charnwood	Belconnen	1981	1996	
Chifley Primary School	Chifley	Woden Valley	1966	1988	Closed and reformed as Melrose PS
Cook Primary School	Cook	Belconnen	1969	2007	
Cotter River School	Cotter Dam		1914	1917	Temporary school for children of the workers of the Cotter Dam
Deakin High School	Deakin	South Canberra	1966	1988	Closed and reformed as Alfred Deakin HS
Downer Primary School	Downer	North Canberra	1962	1988	Merged with Watson PS and Hackett PS to Become Majura PS
Duntroon Primary School	Campbell	North Canberra	1914	1971	
Fisher Primary School	Fisher	Weston Creek	1972	1988	
Flynn Primary School	Flynn	Belconnen	1974	2006	
Ginninderra School	Nicholls	Gungahlin	1870	1911	
Ginninderra District High School	Holt	Belconnen	1974	2005	Demolished and Kingsford Smith School built on site
Griffith Primary School	Griffith	South Canberra	1955	1995	
Gungahleen School	Lyneham	North Canberra	1873	1923	
Hackett Primary School	Hackett	North Canberra	1964	1991	Merged with Downer PS and Watson PS to become Majura PS
Hall Primary School	Hall		1911	2006	
Higgins Primary School	Higgins	Belconnen	1971	2008	Amalgamated into Kingsford Smith School
Holder High School	Holder	Weston Creek	1975	1993	Amalgamated with Weston Creek (Stromlo) HS in 1991
Holder Primary School	Holder	Weston Creek	1972	1991	
Holt Primary School	Holt	Belconnen	1973	2008	Amalgamated into Kingsford Smith School
Kambah High School	Kambah	Tuggeranong	1976	2007	Closed and rebuilt as Namadgi School in 2011
Kowen School	Kowen Forest		1875	1906	
Majura School	Majura		1874	1930	
Melba Primary School	Melba	Belconnen	1973	1997	Merged with Spence PS to form Mount Rogers Community School
Melrose Primary School	Chifley	Woden Valley	1989	2006	Established following closure of Chifley PS & Pearce PS
Mount Neighbour Primary School	Kambah	Tuggeranong	1975	2006	
Mulligans Flat School	Throsby	Gungahlin	1896	1931	
Narrabundah School	Narrabundah	South Canberra	1886	1900	
North Curtin Primary School	Curtin	Woden Valley	1966	1982	Closed and reformed with South Curtin PS as Curtin PS
Page Primary School	Page	Belconnen	1970	1988	
Pearce Primary School	Pearce	Woden Valley	1967	1988	
Rivett Primary School	Rivett	Weston Creek	1972	2006	
Royalla Public School	Royalla		1892	1935	
Russell Hill Primary School	Russell	North Canberra	1927	1930	
School Without Walls	Acton, Braddon and Ainslie	North Canberra	1974	1997	Closed by the department
Scullin Primary School	Scullin	Belconnen	1970	1988	Closed and reformed as Southern Cross PS
South Curtin Primary School	Curtin	Woden Valley	1965	1982	Closed and reformed with North Curtin PS as Curtin PS
Spence Primary School	Spence	Belconnen	1977	1997	Merged with Melba PS to form Mount Rogers Community School
Tharwa Primary School	Tharwa		1899	2006	
Tuggeranong School	Chisholm	Tuggeranong	1870	1940	
Urambi Primary School	Kambah	Tuggeranong	1976	2010	
Uriarra Primary School	Uriarra		1936	2001	Also open 1897–1907
Village Creek Primary School	Kambah	Tuggeranong	1975	2007	
Waramanga Primary School	Waramanga	Weston Creek	1970	1988	Closed and reformed as Arawang PS
Watson High School	Watson	North Canberra	1965	1988	
Watson Primary School	Watson	North Canberra	1970	1988	Closed and reformed with Downer PS and Hackett PS as Majura PS
Weston Creek High School	Waramanga	Weston Creek	1972	1991	Merged with Holder HS to form Stromlo HS
Weston Creek Primary School	Weston	Weston Creek	1971	2006	Formerly Weston PS until 2001
Williamsdale Primary School	Williamsdale		1892	1949	
Woden Valley High School	Phillip	Woden Valley	1968	1988	
Yarralumla School	Yarralumla	South Canberra	1850	1906	

== Non-Government schools ==
=== Catholic Primary schools ===
See Catholic education in Australia

Name	Suburb	District	M/F/Co-ed	Years	Founded
Good Shepherd Catholic Primary School	Amaroo	Gungahlin	Co-ed	K–6	2002
Holy Family Parish Primary School	Gowrie	Tuggeranong	Co-ed	K–6	1985
Holy Spirit Primary School	Nicholls	Gungahlin	Co-ed	K–6	1996
Holy Trinity Primary School	Curtin	Woden Valley	Co-ed	K–6	1966
Mother Teresa Primary School (a campus of Good Shepherd Primary School Amaroo)	Harrison	Gungahlin	Co-ed	K–6	2010
Rosary Primary School	Watson	North Canberra	Co-ed	K–6	1963
Sacred Heart Primary School	Pearce	Woden Valley	Co-ed	K–6	1970
St Anthony's Primary School	Wanniassa	Tuggeranong	Co-ed	K–6	1980
St Bede's Primary School	Red Hill	South Canberra	Co-ed	K–6	1963
St Benedict's Primary School	Narrabundah	South Canberra	Co-ed	K–6	1955
St Clare of Assisi Primary School	Conder	Tuggeranong	Co-ed	K–6	1994
St Francis of Assisi Primary School	Calwell	Tuggeranong	Co-ed	K–6	1988
St John the Apostle Primary School	Florey	Belconnen	Co-ed	K–6	1979
St John Vianney's Primary School	Waramanga	Weston Creek	Co-ed	K–6	1971
St Joseph's Primary School	O'Connor	North Canberra	Co-ed	K–6	1956
St Jude's Primary School	Holder	Weston Creek	Co-ed	K–6	1975
St Matthew's Primary School	Page	Belconnen	Co-ed	K–6	1972
St Michael's Primary School	Kaleen	Belconnen	Co-ed	K–6	1983
St Monica's Primary School	Evatt	Belconnen	Co-ed	K–6	1977
Sts Peter & Paul Primary School	Garran	Woden Valley	Co-ed	K–6	1967
St Thomas Aquinas Primary School	Charnwood	Belconnen	Co-ed	K–6	1975
St Thomas More's Primary School	Campbell	North Canberra	Co-ed	K–6	1960
St Thomas the Apostle School	Kambah	Tuggeranong	Co-ed	K–6	1977
St Vincent's Primary School	Aranda	Belconnen	Co-ed	K–6	1970

=== Catholic High and K–12 schools ===
See Catholic education in Australia

Name	Suburb	District	M/F/Co-ed	Years	Category	Founded	Notes
Daramalan College	Dickson	North Canberra	Co-ed	7–12	Missionaries of the Sacred Heart	1962	
Marist College Canberra	Pearce	Woden Valley	M	4–12	Marist Brothers	1968	
Merici College	Braddon	North Canberra	F	7–12	Systemic	1959	
St Clare's College	Griffith	South Canberra	F	7–12	Systemic	1965	
St Edmund's College	Griffith	South Canberra	M	4–12	Christian Brothers	1954	
St Francis Xavier College	Florey	Belconnen	Co-ed	7–12	Systemic	1976	
St John Paul II College	Nicholls	Gungahlin	Co-ed	7–12	Systemic	2013	
St Mary MacKillop College, Canberra	Isabella Plains and Wanniassa	Tuggeranong	Co-ed	7–12	Systemic	1998	formerly St Peter's Catholic College and Padua Catholic HS

=== Independent schools ===
Name	Suburb	District	M/F/Co-ed	Years	Category	Founded	Notes
Blue Gum Community School	Hackett	North Canberra	Co-ed	K–10	Independent	1998	
Brindabella Christian College	Lyneham and Charnwood	North Canberra and Belconnen	Co-ed	P–12	Christian	1980	formerly O'Connor Christian School until 1997
Burgmann Anglican School	Gungahlin and Forde	Gungahlin	Co-ed	K–12	Anglican	1998	
Canberra Christian School	Mawson	Woden Valley	Co-ed	K–6	Christian	1972	Previously Mawson Christian School
Canberra Girls' Grammar School	Deakin	South Canberra	F	K–12	Anglican	1926	Formerly Canberra Church of England Girls' Grammar School
Canberra Grammar School	Red Hill	South Canberra	Co-ed	K–12	Anglican	1929	Offers HSC and IB for diplomas in year 11 and 12
Canberra Montessori School	Holder	Weston Creek	Co-ed	K–6	Montessori	1980	
Connections High School	Flynn	Belconnen	Co-ed	7-10	Special assistance school	2026	
Covenant Christian School	Gordon	Tuggeranong	Co-ed	K–10	Christian	1991	Formerly a Presbyterian school called Covenant College. Registered for International students
Emmaus Christian School	Dickson	North Canberra	Co-ed	K–10	Christian	1997	
Communities at Work's Galilee School	Weston Creek and Kambah	Woden Valley	Co-ed	7–12	Independent		For "at risk" students years 7–12
Islamic School of Canberra	Weston	Weston Creek	Co-ed	K–12	Islamic	2011	
Orana Steiner School	Weston	Weston Creek	Co-ed	K–12	Steiner	1981	
Stromlo Forest Anglican College	Wright		Co-ed	K–12	Anglican	2026	
Radford College	Bruce	Belconnen	Co-ed	K–12	Anglican	1984	
Taqwa School	Spence		Co-ed	K–6	Islamic		
Trinity Christian School	Wanniassa	Tuggeranong	Co-ed	K–12	Christian	1980	

=== Closed Non-Government schools ===
The following is a list of closed non-government schools in the ACT.

Name	Suburb	District	Category	Opened	Closed	Notes
AME School, Duntroon	Campbell	North Canberra	Independent	1972	1976	Moved to Weston in 1977
AME School, Weston	Weston	Weston Creek	Independent	1977	1996	Buildings merged with adjacent Orana School
Our Lady of Mercy Primary School	Braddon	North Canberra	Catholic	1935	1973	
Padua Catholic High School	Wanniassa	Tuggeranong	Catholic	1978	1997	Amalgamated into St Mary MacKillop College
St Brigid's Primary School	Dickson	North Canberra	Catholic	1960	1986	
St Christopher's School	Forrest	South Canberra	Catholic	1928	1971	
St Michael's Primary School	Lyneham	North Canberra	Catholic	1961	1973	
St Peter Chanel's Primary School	Yarralumla	South Canberra	Catholic	1956	1989	
St Peter's Catholic College	Isabella Plains	Tuggeranong	Catholic	1989	1997	Amalgamated into St Mary MacKillop College
