= Red Hill School =

Primary school in Canberra, Australia

Coordinates: 35.3391728°S 149.1336108°E

Red Hill School is a government international primary school located in the suburb of Red Hill, in Canberra, Australia. It is the first government school in the Australian Capital Territory and New South Wales to implement the International Baccalaureate Primary Years Programme, having gained IBO membership in 2006.

Students come from more than 65 different nationalities and cultural backgrounds, with more than 22 languages spoken in the school community.

== History ==
Construction of the school began in 1959. By 1962, 907 pupils were enrolled at the school.

Chief Minister Andrew Barr commented in 2010, when he was the Minister for Education and Training, that Red Hill School was founded in 1960 to service the growing needs of Canberra's public servants, as the Federal Government’s civil and diplomatic service expanded. The suburb of Red Hill was ideal to serve this particular growing need, as it is positioned at the edge of the Parliamentary Triangle and right beside the suburb of Yarralumla, where multiple embassies are located.

On 26 May 1960, The Canberra Times reported that the acting Deputy Director of Technical Education in New South Wales Mr. R. E. Dunbar stated that the school was "the best educational building he had seen" after visiting the newly constructed school compounds in 1960, while the Principal of the Canberra Technical College Mr. J. Gillis further remarked that "the school was the finest they had seen", as both men have travelled overseas to study educational constructions.

In May 2021, a new play park, football pitch, and bike track was opened.

== Culture and Identity ==
As reported by the Australian Curriculum, Assessment and Reporting Authority (ACARA) in 2018, the school community is highly diverse and international with families from diplomatic, government, defence force, university and business backgrounds from more than 65 different nationalities and cultural backgrounds.

As of 2016, 32% of the teaching staff possess a postgraduate qualification in the following areas of education: Early Childhood, Gifted and Talented, English as an Additional Language, Inclusive Education, Pedagogy and Educational Leadership.

== Enrolment ==
According to statistics by the ACT Department of Education, students of the school include diplomatic, government, defence force, university and other backgrounds and takes students residing within its school priority enrolment area of Red Hill, Kingston, Griffith, Narrabundah, Fyshwick, Symonston, Harman and Oaks Estate.

The school has an enrolment of 802 students (as of 2019) and is expected to expand further in 2020.

2018 statistics by ACARA place the school's Index of Community Socio-Educational Advantage (ICSEA) at 1149, while the national average stood at 1000, placing 71% of students in the top quarter of the educational advantage distribution.

The school has a teacher-to-student ratio of 1-to-17 and 40% of students come from a language background other than English, while 3% of the student population is of an indigenous background.

== Facilities ==
On 26 November 2010, a new $3.3 million multi-purpose hall was officially opened by then Minister for Education and Training Andrew Barr (current Chief Minister of the Australian Capital Territory), in commencement of the school’s 50th anniversary celebrations. The new hall has been equipped with indoor sports facilities that further supports the school's strong sporting program.

Subsequently, over the course of two years, the school also received $6.3 million in ACT Government funding for 8 new classrooms, new administration areas and car park upgrades.

== International Baccalaureate in the ACT ==
Canberra's residential districts were developed with the intention of being semi-self-contained satellite towns and the district of South Canberra comprises four IB World Schools that are complementary: Red Hill Primary School, Forrest Primary School, Telopea Park High School and Narrabundah College. The IBO Diploma Program has been on offer at Narrabundah College for 25 years, being the first IBO accredited school and college in Australia. The IB Middle Years Program is offered at Telopea Park High School while the Primary Years Program is offered at Red Hill School for every student from kindergarten to year 6.

In 2006 Red Hill School was the first government IBO World school in the ACT and NSW implementing the Primary Years Program.

== Programs ==
The school offers a range of courses, including language programs, an Indigenous Action Group, specialist music courses (including West African drumming) and a variety of enrichment programs.

The school's choir and bands perform at assemblies throughout the year and also at public functions, including Floriade, local retirement villages and nursing homes.

== Preschools ==
Red Hill Preschool and Griffith Preschool are managed by Red Hill School and delivers the IB inquiry program and a play-based developmental curriculum, underpinned by the Early Years Learning Framework.

Due to its shared history, the French-Australian Preschool shares its premise with Red Hill Primary School. In 1977, the French-Australian Preschool was recognised by the Commonwealth Department of Education and the ACT School's Authority and moved to rented premises attached to Red Hill School. In 1977, an agreement was reached between the French and Australian governments to establish a bi-national school in Canberra, thereby firmly establishing the French-Australian Preschool. By 1994, the preschool was officially recognised by the French Ministry of Education (Homologation) and purchased the land and buildings it currently occupies in 2012.

In January 2022, a Spanish-Australian preschool was opened.

== See also ==
- List of schools in the Australian Capital Territory
- List of schools in Australia
- Education in the Australian Capital Territory
