= Canberra College =

College/secondary school in Canberra, Australia

Location
- 2 Launceston Street; Canberra, ACT, 2606; Australia; 35.339775°S 149.088852°E

Information
- Type: College/secondary school
- Motto: Caring for your Future
- Established: 17 March 1997
- School district: Woden Valley & Weston Creek
- Educational authority: ACT Department of Education & Training
- Principal: Simon Vaughan
- Grades: Year 11–12
- Age range: 15–18
- Enrolment: 955
- Education system: Public education
- Language: English
- Hours in school day: 4–7 hours
- Campus: Urban
- Feeder schools: Alfred Deakin High School; Melrose High School; Mount Stromlo High School
- Website: www.canberrac.act.edu.au

The Canberra College (formerly known as the Phillip College) is an Australian Capital Territory public school, which educates students from year 11 to year 12. In 2022, Simon Vaughan was appointed Principal, taking over from Michael Battenally.

The school was founded in 1976 under the name of Phillip College after secondary schools were in demand while a working party recommended the establishment of autonomous education. A Commonwealth Teaching Service was approved in September 1970 to provide teachers in Canberran schools. The name of the school was changed and reopened under the name of the Canberra College in 1997 after the Stirling College in Stirling amalgamated with the Phillip College. It was officially opened on 19 March 1997 by the Minister for Education and Training, Bill Stefaniak.

The Canberra College offered the International Baccalaureate diploma in its curriculum until 2017 when it was discontinued for the following year. The college was an IB World School from March 2008.

== History ==
Community interest in Territory education was rising in the 1960s, especially with the increase of student admissions in the ACT. In 1966 a working party led by George Currie was convened, which they presented a report in November 1967 recommending the establishment of an autonomous education authority responsible for all government schools in the Australian Capital Territory. At the same time, an independent education system was being thought of and considered, and the Department of Education and Sciences began canvassing secondary colleges to serve year 11 and year 12 students. In November 1971, Malcolm Fraser established a working party to review the proposal. Fraser and his working party supported the presented report in 1972. In that same year, a Commonwealth Teaching Service for the ACT was established in April 1972 but was first approved in September 1970.

The first secondary schools were in Phillip, Hawker, and Melba. The Canberra College was established in 1976 but was originally known as Phillip College. Stirling College opened in 1977. In 1984, multiple students at Stirling College participated in a study by the Australian Institute of Criminology, concerning to understand and apply standard jury instructions there were being developed for possible use for criminal courts in New South Wales. Stirling College was amalgamated with Phillip College in 1997 under one entity, which is now known as the Canberra College. Michael Battenally was appointed as principal in 2019 and replaced George Palavestra. The college has 955 students enrolled.

In 2007, 107 students were awarded a vocational certificate and 228 students were the vocational statement of attainment, as well as a UAI of 75%. In 2009, Canberra College won $750,000 for its CCCares program. The school beat 1,500 other entrants to win the inaugural Schools First National Impact award.

== Academics ==
=== Student admissions ===
From 28 April 2014, all schools including Canberra College followed a new sort of arrangement of enrolling or transferring a student from a school. This new arrangement means students may use an online enroll/transfer form.

Students enroll in 5 or 6 subjects, which are either listed as accredited or tertiary, but students regardless of doing accredited packages may enroll in a T subject.

=== Academic results ===
In 2009, the Australian Capital Territory adopted the Australian Tertiary Admission Rank (ATAR) which replaced the Universities Admission Index (UAI). In 2013, the median ATAR for the Canberra College was 74.50, which was slightly lower than the ACT average of 77.85. However, Canberra College was among the highest-ranked when it came to several year 12 certificates awarded to graduating students at 365.

Canberra College has ranked average during every ATAR result but usually sits slightly below the average. The school was more successful in 2012 when the median ATAR was 79.15 (above the 2012 average of 78.05) with 377 total year 12 certificates awarded to students.

Below is a table presenting past ATAR results for the Canberra College:

Canberra College academic results 2009-2014
Academic indicator	2014	2013	2012	2011	2010	2009
No. of Year 12 certificates awarded	380	365	377	-	-	-
Median ATAR score	77.20	74.50	79.15	77.55	72.95	77.55
No. of Year 12 students awarded a vocational qualification	301	241	226	-	-	-
% of Year 12 Certificate Receivers awarded TES	59%	58%	60%	-	-	-
% of TES eligible students with an ATAR >= 65.00	75%	65%	75%	75%	63%	73%

== Principals ==
These are the only known principals of Canberra College:

Period	Details
1996–1999	Rob McConchie
2001–2004	Barry Woolacott
2005–2014	John Stenhouse
2014	Simon Vaughan (acting)
2014–2018	George Palavestra
2019–present	Michael Battenally

== Campus ==
=== Facilities ===
Canberra College has two campuses, one in Phillip and one in Stirling. The Phillip Campus is located on Launceston Street and the Weston Campus is located on Fremantle Drive. Campus facilities include general use laboratories, kitchen classrooms, a gym which is connected to the main building at the Phillip Campus, and the "Asgard Theatre" which is where school assemblies are held, and a lecture theatre, which is situated across from the schools front office. The school also has a canteen (near the Student Services area) and free Wi-Fi facilities for all the students and staff. It also has metal, wood, and technology workshops. Students have easy access to the Woden Town Centre and the Woden Interchange. Most classrooms are fitted with Smart Boards (Interactive Whiteboards). Canberra College has two parking grounds, used by school staff and students. Across the road from the college is Edison Park, which is near the Woden Cemetery. Canberra College is right next to Phillip Oval and it is also not far from the Canberra Hospital and various playing fields. The school has plenty of computer facilities with both Apple and Windows computers which are easily accessible. The school has its library with its computer facilities and study areas, along with a large choice of books.

While all students study for an ACT Year 12 Certificate, students may earn additional awards including the IB Diploma, nationally recognised training packages, ASBA's, and the Big Picture program. The College Board is the governing body of the college, which meets nine times a year to discuss issues or matters of interest about or to the college and the ACT government education system. The college has a school counsellor which all students have free access to.

=== Canberra College Performing Arts Centre ===
The Canberra College Performing Arts Centre (CCPAC) was opened at Canberra College in 2012. The project cost was an estimated $9.35 million to complete. The CCPAC complements programs such as the Step into The Limelight and the Instrumental Music Program. ACT Education Minister Chris Bourke officially opened the Canberra College Performing Arts Centre. The Canberra College Performing Arts Centre was one of many buildings in 2013 to win the 2013 Australian Capital Territory Architectural Award.

The CCPAC contains multiple studios and facilities. It has a theatre, a dance studio, a drama studio, a music studio, and many other rooms. The theatre consists of 174 seats, a large stage in which the main stage is 14.12m by 6.38m long, and the Apron is 14.12m by 4.58m. It also consists of a projector with HDMI capabilities and two main FOH lighting bridges. The music studio consists of some recording and practice rooms. The dance studio measures at 15m by 8m, and has sprung parquet Harlequin flooring, and surround sound. The drama studio consists of being 9.8m by 14.3m by 4.5m in size. It contains an enclosed black box theatre, and set lighting rig with Strand Pitt 123/23 soft coverage and specials. Other rooms in the performing arts centre include a kitchenette/box office, unisex toilets, baby change areas, two dressing rooms, shower facilities, and a loading dock.

=== CCCares ===
The CCCares is a program at the Canberra College which is housed in the new purpose-built facility at Woden. The program first formally began in 2004 at the former Weston campus at Stirling. In 2012, Chief Minister Katy Gallagher unveiled a new $14.5 million project to construct a new facility for the Canberra College which would be a part of the 2014–15 Australian Capital Territory Budget. The facility would include classroom areas, play areas, health clinics, offices, mirroring those facilities already available on the Weston Campus. The new facility was designed to be able to accommodate more than 80 students and their children.

The primary purpose of the program is to provide education and support for pregnant and parenting students in the ACT and surrounding regions and to allow them to bring their children to school in an adjunct childcare arrangement. The program is the first and only kind in the world. The new Woden building's construction was completed in late 2014 and was officially opened in 2015.

=== Weston Campus ===
The Weston Campus was the site of the former Stirling College until it was amalgamated with Phillip College in 1997 to form the Canberra College. The campus has been renamed to the Hedley Beare Centre for Teaching and Learning (HBCTL). The site also used to house the Eclipse Program, which focused on year 8, 9 and 10 students who did not perform well in the mainstream high school system, a Brain Gym, and a community library. The CCCares used to operate at the Weston Campus.

== Curriculum ==
Canberra College offers many subjects and units that students may wish to study either being accredited or tertiary packages. Some classes will offer both packages. Classes at the college are maintained and administered by seven school faculties that have their staff rooms. These faculties are:

Faculties of the Canberra College
Arts
Commerce, Languages and Social Sciences (CLASS)
Humanities
Mathematics
Physical Education
Science/Technology
IT

=== Faculties ===
The Arts Faculty encompasses subjects such as dance, drama, media, music, music industry, photography and visual art. Students learning drama tour a devised theatre piece that they perform at the Adelaide Fringe. The school has a Jazz band which performs at jazz festivals annually, while dance students perform at various dance festivals. These subjects are taught at the Canberra College Performing Arts Centre.

The Commerce, Library and Social Sciences (CLASS) Faculty offer subjects for students such as accounting, business, business administration, economics, geography, legal studies, psychology, sociology and social and community work.

The school has a Humanities Faculty that encompasses various subjects, including English studies, theory of knowledge (tok), history (including pre-history, ancient history, medieval history and modern history). The school teaches five languages which students may choose to learn, including French, German, Italian, Japanese and Mandarin, and the school also offers an EALD (English as an Additional Language or Dialect) program for students who speak English as a second language. All languages provide beginning, intermediate, continuing, or advanced levels for languages.

The Mathematics Faculty only teaches mathematics, but the faculty offers multiple courses. The courses include general mathematics (which is the only accredited course), mathematical applications, mathematical methods and specialist mathematics.

The Physical Education Faculty caters a Sports Academy program which enrolls students into the Sports Development Course of study. The faculty encompasses physical education, sports science, sports development and outdoor education.

The Science/IT Faculty offers class subjects such as biology, chemistry, physics and horticulture. It also has courses to do with Information Technology.

=== Special education ===
The Canberra College offers a unique special education unit catering students who have slight to mild intellectual disabilities. With this program, dozens of students who have disabilities at the school are provided with education and help to achieve as much opportunity as what mainstream students would have. This program is known as the Futures Program, which is highly respected at the school.

Students in the program are able to have partnerships with numerous organisations and governmental institutions to ensure students have realistic training placements for their future. They are also able to participate in music and dance festivals and other skills which would help them develop multiple skills. Canberra College has also participated in the ACT Mental Illness School Program.

== Co-curriculum ==
=== Sports ===
The Canberra College runs a Sports Academy and caters students in a wide range of individual and team sports as players, coaches, and umpires. Students who are selected in this program are enrolled into the Sports Development course which gives opportunity to students in taking this field. The following topics are studied in the Sports Development course are:

- Fitness assessment
- Training programs and routines
- Psychology of sport
- Communications and media
- Physiology
- Time management
- Nutrition
- Drugs in sport
- Biomechanics

=== Ensembles ===
Since the Canberra College offers music as a subject for students, the school allows students to join a musical ensemble, known as the Canberra College Jazz Band. The band is always invited to participate in festivals, community events, and ACT Department events.

The jazz band regularly have opportunities to attend the Merimbula and Moruya Jazz Festivals. They have also been invited to perform at events such as the Paving Pathways VET Network 2012 biennial national conference at the National Convention Centre, and have reappeared again at the chief minister's reading awards at the National Gallery of Australia in 2012.

== Controversy ==
In 2012, students and teachers who knew and were friends with a 17-year-old Syrian female student of an expelled Syrian diplomat tried to bring her back to Canberra College in order for her to complete her year 12 education. Former principal John Stenhouse commented saying "someone who we thought was worthy of some special consideration".

== Notable alumni ==
- Michael O'Connor, Australian rugby union and rugby league international
- Imogen Bailey, Australian model, actress and singer
- Katy Gallagher, Labor Party politician (Weston campus)
- Liv Hewson, actress
- Sandra Hill, footballer (soccer)
- Ezra Getzler, mathematician.
- Ian Wanless, mathematician.

== See also ==
- List of schools in Australia
- List of schools in the Australian Capital Territory
- Education in the Australian Capital Territory
- International Baccalaureate Organization
