= Chisholm School =

Chisholm School or Chisholm College may refer to:

- Caroline Chisholm College, a Catholic girls high school in Glenmore Park, New South Wales, Australia
- Caroline Chisholm Catholic College, Melbourne, a Catholic co-educational high school in Braybrook, Victoria, Australia
- Chisholm Catholic College, Perth, a Catholic co-educational high school in Bedford, Western Aurstralia, Australia
- Chisholm Catholic College (Cornubia), a Catholic co-educational high school in Cornubia, Queensland, Australia
- Chisholm Junior School, a part of Upper Coomera State College, Coomera, Queensland, Australia
- Caroline Chisholm School, a state co-educational school for students with intellectual disabilities in Padstow, New South Wales, Australia
- Caroline Chisholm School – Senior Campus, a state co-educational high school in Chisholm, Australia Capital Territory, Australia
- Chisholm College, a student accommodation building at La Trobe University, Bundoora, Victoria, Australia
- Chisholm High School, a high school in Enid, Oklahoma, United States
- Chisholm Institute, a technical and vocational college with campuses in various parts of Greater Melbourne, Victoria, Australia
- Chisholm Institute of Technology, a defunct technical and vocational college, now the Caulfield campus of Monash University, Victoria, Australia
