= Mount Stromlo High School =

Secondary school in Canberra, Australia

Location
- 220 Badimara Street; 220 Badimara Street, Waramanga, Canberra; Weston creek Canberra, ACT, 2611; 35.3550°S 149.0552°E

Information
- Former names: Weston Creek High School, Holder High School
- Type: Public co-educational secondary
- Motto: Respect, Responsibility, Learning
- Established: 1991
- Educational authority: ACT Department of Education & Training
- Principal: Peter Radford
- Years taught: 7-10
- Age range: 11-17
- Enrolment: 835 (2024)
- Language: English
- Mascot: Stromaz (zebra)
- Website: www.mountstromlohs.act.edu.au

Mount Stromlo High School is a public co-educational secondary school in the Canberra suburb of Waramanga, Australian Capital Territory, Australia. It is administered by the ACT Education Directorate, with an enrolment of 835 students and a teaching staff of 66 as of 2024. The school serves students from Year 7 to Year 10 and was founded in 1991 after the merger of Weston Creek High School and Holder High School in 1990.

== Notable alumni ==
Alumni lists can be found on the Names Database. As for notable alumni, Taimus Werner-Gibbings and Helen Razer have attended the school.

== See also ==
- Education in the Australian Capital Territory
- List of schools in the Australian Capital Territory
