= Harmonie German Club =

Social club in Canberra, Australia

Coordinates: 35.3388°S 149.1517°E

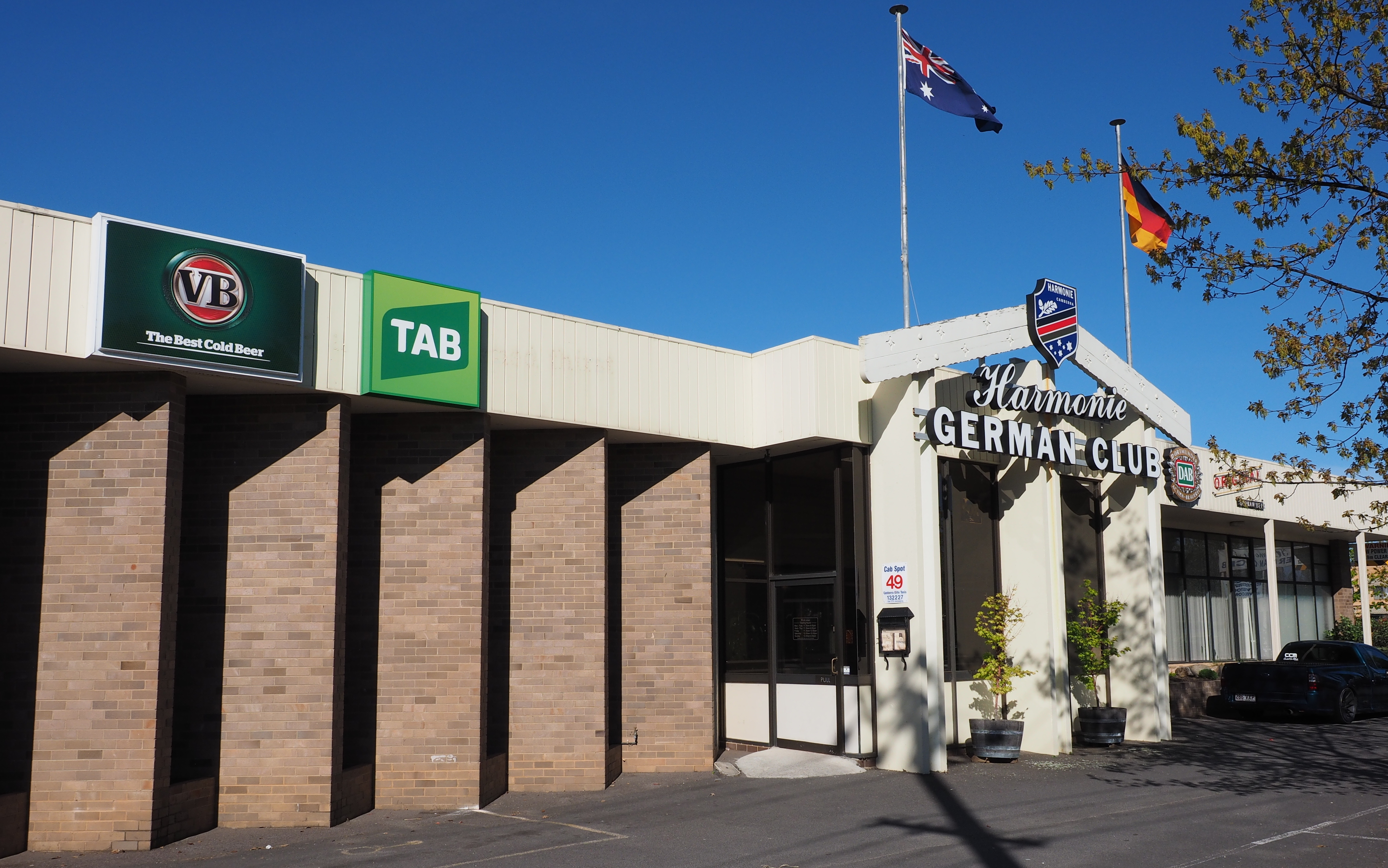
- Front entrance, 2016
- Interactive map of Harmonie German Club
- Address: Australia

Construction
- Opened: 1963

Website
- harmonieclub.com.au

The Harmonie German Club is a social club in Canberra, Australia founded and built by German migrants, including the "Jennings Germans", in the early 1960s. In the mid 1960s migrants and their children made up half of Canberra's 80,000 population. Community clubs, including for example those founded by Italian, German and Polish migrants, were recognised as important for welcoming new settlers, providing venues to socialise and reminisce.

== Background ==
From the laying of its foundation stone in 1913, the progress of building Canberra, the new capital city of Australia, was slow. The First World War, the Great Depression and then the Second World War meant resources for construction were limited. After the 1939-45 War suburban growth was essential to house the public servants whose Commonwealth Departments were moving to the nation's administrative centre. The population grew from around 17,000 in 1947 to over 30,000 in 1954. Skilled tradespeople were in severe shortage and housing construction firm A V Jennings was forced to seek carpenters from Germany.

=== The Jennings Germans ===
A V Jennings was contracted by the government in 1950 to build 1850 homes but the limited availability of local tradesmen led to sourcing qualified migrants. Canberra's Technical College building trades head and an interpreter travelled to Germany to test and recruit 150 men from the 2,500 men who had responded to advertisements. The men arrived in Australia on two year contracts and commenced work in January 1952. Within the two years, 1800 new houses had been completed. Around 100 of the men chose to stay in Australia when their contracts were over. They were known as the Jennings Germans.

== Club foundation ==
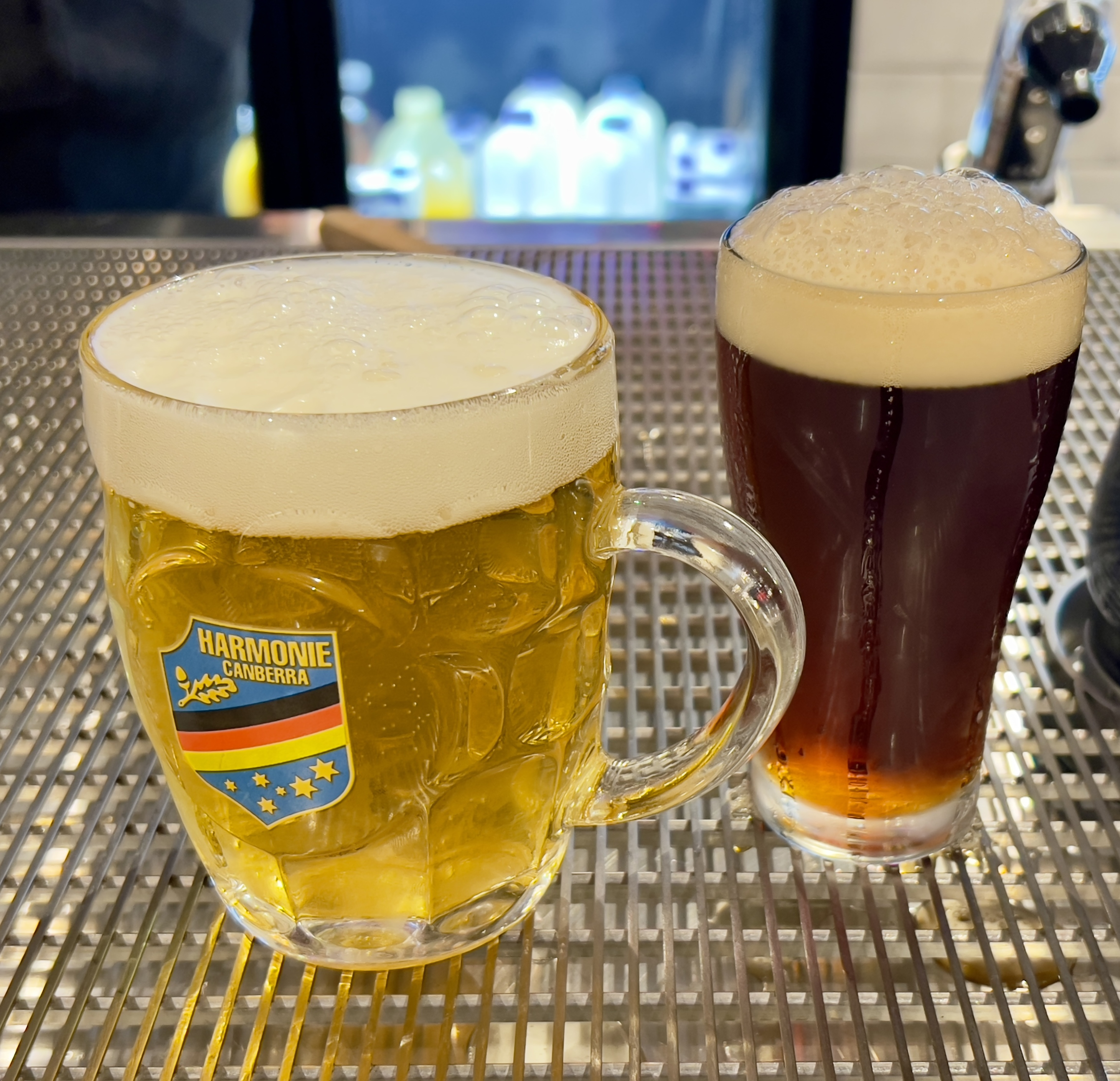
A selection of beers

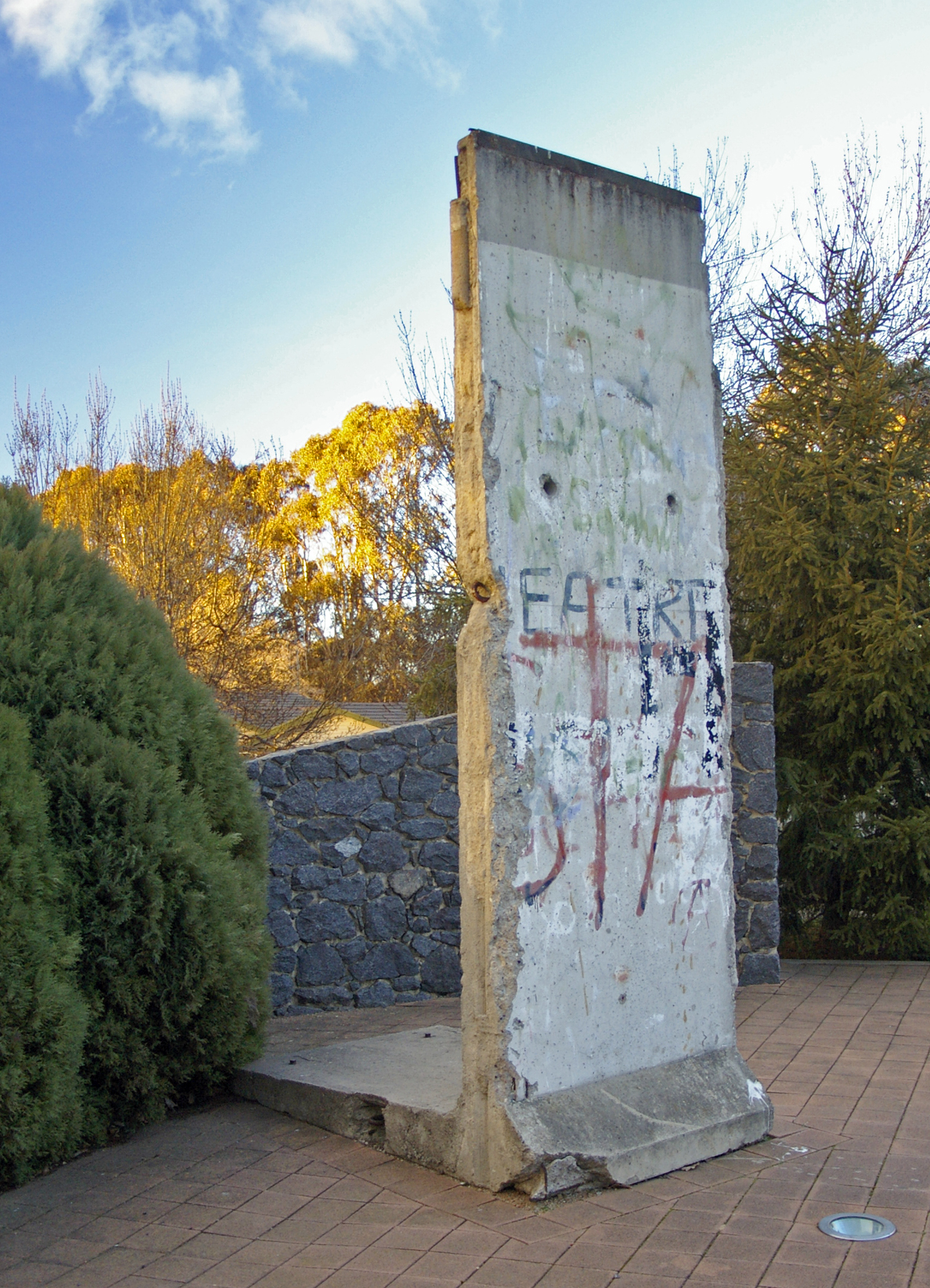
The section of the Berlin Wall outside the Harmonie German Club

Those Jennings Germans still in Canberra, along with other German expatriates, including some who had migrated to Australia to work on the Snowy Mountains Scheme, founded the Harmonie German Club in the Canberra suburb of Narrabundah.

Work on the club began in August 1962 and was built by volunteer labour. The foundation stone was laid in 1963 and the club was opened a year later. In 1972 it was extended, becoming the largest of Canberra's migrant clubs.

In 1992 a section of the Berlin Wall was installed outside the club.

== Reunions ==
Jennings Germans have attended reunions at the club since 1965. Albert Jennings attended the 25th anniversary of their arrival, in 1977. Minister for Immigration and Ethnic Affairs, Michael MacKellar wrote to congratulate their success "One would have to look far to find a better example of migration to Australia than that of the 150 German carpenters who arrived in Canberra 25 years ago... [They] faced their difficulties, built their houses and, fortunately for us, most of them decided to stay and build their lives here too."

== Canberra Oktoberfest ==
In 1963 a group of Jennings Germans expatriates from Munich instigated Canberra's annual three-day Oktoberfest and the club has organised it every year since except in 2020, which was cancelled due to the COVID-19 pandemic. The festival includes such traditional German celebrations as folk dancing, bands, food and beers. It has attracted attendances of up to 25,000. The festivities were being held at Exhibition Park in Canberra, but large increases in ACT Government hiring fees, liquor licensing, and security costs meant that from 2017 Oktoberfest was moved to the Showgrounds in nearby Queanbeyan.
