= John Paul College, Canberra =

St. John Paul II College, Canberra

Location
- Gungahlin, Australian Capital Territory; Australia
- 35.177303°S 149.101161°E

Information
- Type: Systemic day co-educational high school
- Motto: Justice, Peace, Courage
- Religious affiliation: Roman Catholic Archdiocese of Canberra and Goulburn
- Denomination: Roman Catholic
- Established: 2013; 13 years ago
- Principal: Mr Michael Lee OAM
- Years offered: 7-12
- Enrolment: 909 (2024)
- Colours: Royal blue, sea blue & red
- Website: www.jpc.act.edu.au

St John Paul II College is a systemic Roman Catholic co-educational high school located in the Canberra suburb of Nicholls in the Australian Capital Territory of Australia. The school is named in honour of Pope John Paul II.

The school caters for boys and girls from years 7-12 who live in the Gungahlin area and nearby regional areas in New South Wales. The school is part of the Roman Catholic Archdiocese of Canberra and Goulburn.

== Curriculum ==
St John Paul II College follows the Australian Curriculum.

In Year 7 students undertake six subjects, which through a middle school approach, encourages a smooth transition to high school. English, History, Geography and Civics & Citizenship are combined into Integrated Humanities, and Maths and Science are also combined into one subject. This is to make the transition to high school smoother for the students by limiting the number of different teachers and classes.

Subjects are:

- Religious Education
- Integrated Humanities (IH) (English, History, Geography, Civics and Citizenship)
- Integrated Maths and Science (IMS)
- Physical Education and Health
- LOTE - French or Chinese
- four electives (one a term)

After Year 7, the integrated subjects, IMS and IH, are separated into single subjects.

Subjects studied are:

- Religious Education
- English
- Mathematics (Optional Advanced Mathematics for Year 10)
- Science
- HASS (History, Geography, Civics and Citizenship)
- Physical Education and Health
- LOTE - French or Chinese (elective in Year 9)
- four electives (one a term)

== Liverpool FC International Academy ==
In May 2025, the former principal Chris Wattams announced the collaboration of St John Paul II College with Liverpool FC to host the first and only world-class soccer program in Canberra. The academy operates directly within the school environment and provides high-performance development pathways. These programs offered include:

- Authentic training methodology mirroring the professional UK Academy.
- High-performance soccer school programs integrated during school hours.
- Weekly Player Development Programs for varying youth age brackets.
- Holiday camps and skills clinics open to young players looking to learn "The Liverpool Way".

== See also ==
- List of schools in the Australian Capital Territory
- Associated Southern Colleges
