= Helen Razer =

Australian radio broadcaster

- Born: Melbourne, Australia
- Presenting career
- Stations: Triple J, Joy FM, 774 ABC
- Style: Host
- Country: Australia

Helen Razer is a Melbourne-born and Canberra-raised radio presenter and writer. She is the author of four non-fiction books and a columnist with the Australian version of The Big Issue, Melbourne newspaper The Age and contributor to the monthly magazine Cherrie and weekly newspaper The Saturday Paper.

== Early life ==
Razer attended Weston Creek High School (now Stromlo High School) from 1981 to 1984, and then Narrabundah College.

== Media work ==
Razer was a radio broadcaster on national Australian youth station Triple J from 1990 to 1998. She was partnered for most of this time with comedian Mikey Robins on the breakfast program. She also appeared on the Ladies Lounge program with Judith Lucy in the afternoons. She left after being targeted by a stalker, who had been active for several years and, convinced he was her husband, managed to get into the studio.

In 1999, ABC TV's watchdog program Media Watch lampooned her overuse of long and arcane words.

In 2002 she became a programmer for Joy FM, Melbourne's gay and lesbian community radio station. Razer worked in the role for twelve weeks.

In 2005 Razer was employed as presenter of the Sunday arts program on the 774 ABC Melbourne radio station. In October 2008, the ABC announced that she was to finish in this position before the end of the year as "part of a freshening of program formats". The announcement came two weeks after a controversial interview, on 7 September 2008, with actor Steven Berkoff. On the 15 September 2008 episode of ABC TV's Media Watch program presenter Jonathan Holmes accused Razer of patronising Berkoff in the interview by referring to him as "dear" and asking how good was the play he was on the radio "to flog". She finally called Berkoff a "curmudgeon" and then cut him off.

Razer has written feature article and reviews for The Age and the Sydney Morning Herald. She is also a regular contributor to the online Crikey news website and was previously an opinion columnist writing for The Australian newspaper.

Razer also wrote a column for The Big Issue and had a blog called "Bad Hostess", which ran until the mid-2010s.

In the 2011 Year 12 VCE English examination, the Victorian Curriculum and Assessment Authority instructed over 40,000 students to analyse a supposedly fictional blog article that was, in fact, taken from an opinion piece written by Razer and published in The Age newspaper in 2010. VCAA had not asked Razer for permission to use the article and had not acknowledged her as the author. Razer said her professional reputation had suffered as a result and there were "hundreds of derogatory references to the exam question and herself on social media after students posted links to the original article".

In October 2017, Razer was quoted in an article on general and especially sexual health for over-40 females. She was said to be 49, and finding that dating as an older woman can be a frustrating experience.

In 2017, she wrote an article for Quartz website titled Why I’m a communist—and why you should be, too in which she discussed the difference between communism, socialism, and liberalism, Karl Marx's prediction of the decline of capitalism and put the view that a "good, productive life for all demands a new and collective mode of production".

In 2018, Razer began her own podcast Knackers & the Vadge in which Razer took the name The Vadge and Knackers was a stuffed animal whose function was to keep Razer under control.

Razer contributed an essay to the book A Secret Australia: Revealed by the WikiLeaks Exposés which was published in December 2020. Reviewing the book for The Sydney Morning Herald, Jessie Tu wrote that Razer's "amusing voice cuts through the somewhat parched tenor of cold academic-speak that lightly threads through the other essays".

=== Health ===
Razer has been critical of some approaches to mental health awareness. In 2015, she was critical of the Australian Broadcasting Corporation’s “Mental As” week offerings.

== Bibliography ==
- Gas Smells Awful: The Mechanics of Being a Nutcase. Australia: Vintage. 2001. ISBN 1-74051-095-X.
- Everything's Fine: A Beginner's Guide to Thwarting Primary Nihilism. Australia: Random House. 1998. ISBN 0-09-183925-4.
- In Pursuit of Hygiene. Australia: Random House. 1996. ISBN 0-09-183258-6.
- co-author with Mikey Robins (1995). Three Beers and a Chinese Meal. Australia: Random House. ISBN 0-09-183072-9.
- co-author with Bernard Keane (2014). A Short History of Stupid. Australia: Allen & Unwin. ISBN 978-1-76011-054-3.
- Total Propaganda: Basic Marxist Brainwashing for the Angry and the Young. Australia: Allen & Unwin. 2017. ISBN 978-1-76029-731-2.
