= Lyneham Primary School =

Primary school in Canberra, Australia

Coordinates: 35.2513°S 149.1262°E

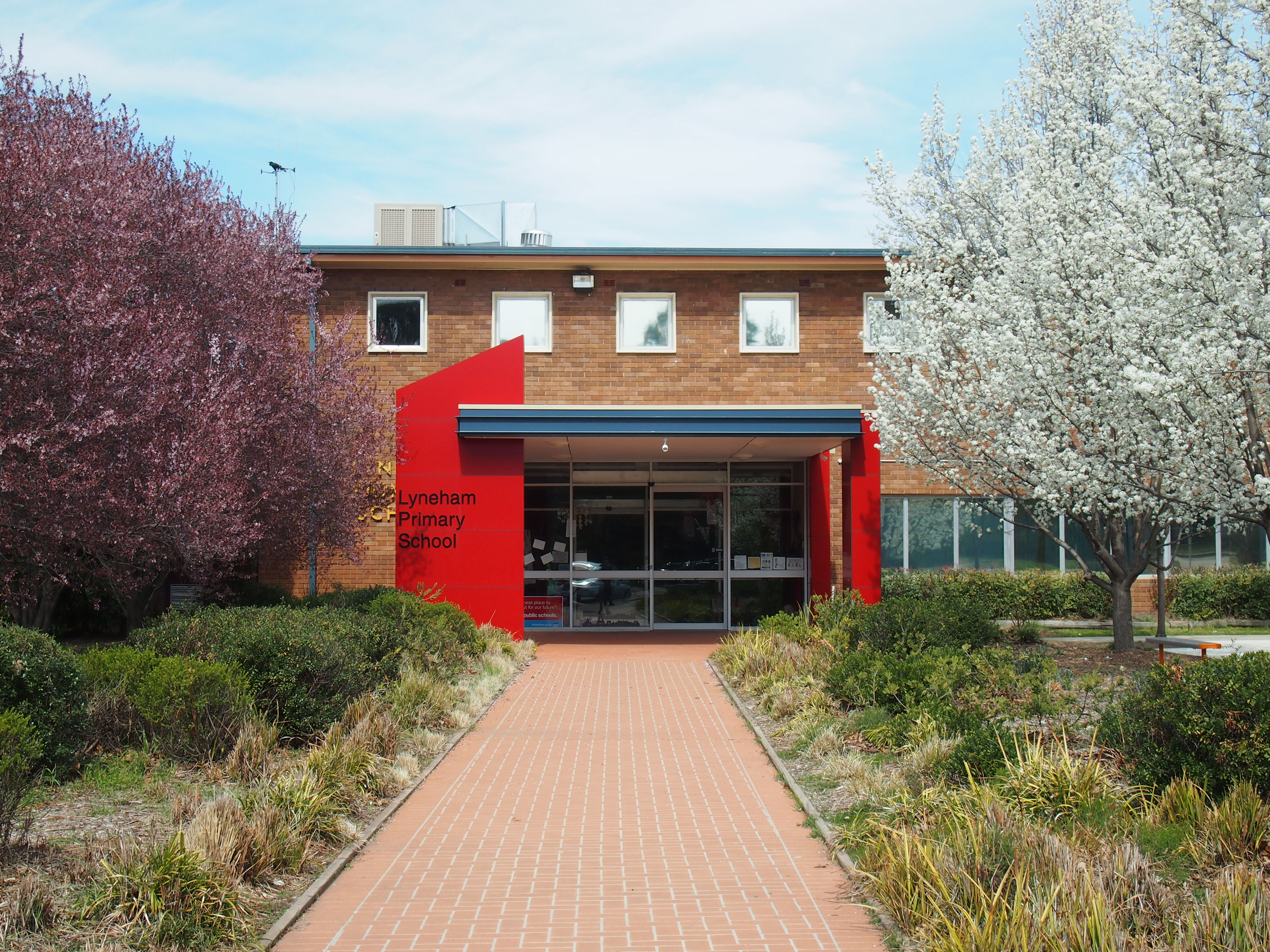

Location
- Brigalow Street, Lyneham; Canberra, Australian Capital Territory; Australia

Information
- Type: Co-educational and primary
- Motto: Learn Progress Serve
- Established: 1959
- Principal: Merryn O’Dea
- Grades: P to 6
- Enrolment: ~515 (2018)
- Campus: Lyneham
- Colours: Yellow and royal blue
- Website: https://www.lynehamps.act.edu.au/

Lyneham Primary School is a primary school in Canberra founded in 1959 located in the suburb of Lyneham. Lyneham and Downer Preschools nearby, are also run by the school. The school has an enrolment of some 500 students (as of 2018) and takes students from the school priority enrolment area of Lyneham, O'Connor, Downer, Turner, and Dickson area.

The school was opened in 1959 and, being a short distance from the historic Yass to Queanbeyan road, took students from both Canberra and nearby New South Wales villages. In 1969 most of the school was destroyed by fire and classes were dispersed to nearby schools. The infants department returned to the school in late 1970 while the primary department returned in 1971. The fire was reviewed by the Australian Auditor-General, which led to criticisms of the standards of fire alarm installation in Commonwealth-controlled schools. By 1973, the Australian Parliament's Public Accounts Committee examined the outcomes of the fire for a second time, and indicated that the blaze had led Australian government departments to reclassify school buildings as special purpose buildings, commence installation of thermal fire protection systems in all schools, and examine suitable burglar alarm systems.

== See also ==
- List of schools in the Australian Capital Territory
- Lists of schools in Australia
- Education in the Australian Capital Territory
