= Caroline Chisholm School – Senior Campus =

Coordinates: 35.4177°S 149.1219°E

Caroline Chisholm High School
- Chisholm, Australian Capital Territory; Australia

Information
- Motto: Prestige and Status
- Established: 1985
- Key people: Jennifer Howard (Principal)
- Grades: 7–10
- Enrollment: Approx. 670
- Website: https://www.chisholm.act.edu.au/home

The newly amalgamated senior campus of Caroline Chisholm School (previously Caroline Chisholm High School), is an Australian public high school in the Chisholm suburb of Canberra in the Australian Capital Territory (ACT) catering to years 7 to 10. The school is known mainly for its strong academic reputation, and extensive dramatic arts program. The school is often among the highest regarded secondary schools in the Australian Capital Territory for academia, dramatic arts, and sports. It has received international media coverage regarding its renowned list of alumni. It is one of the many new 'super schools' operated by the ACT Department of Education and Training.

== History ==
The school is named after Australian pioneer Caroline Chisholm. The senior campus opened in 1985 under the name "Caroline Chisholm High School", and was awarded the 1986 Royal Australian Institute of Architects Canberra Medallion for Outstanding Architecture for producing an exceptionally high quality structure at a relatively low cost using regular materials.

== Curriculum ==
The new amalgamated P-10 school offers a wide range of subjects with English, Mathematics, Science, Humanities and Social Sciences and Physical Education being compulsory. Elective subjects include Indonesian, Music, Drama, Food, Dance, Sewing, Art, Photography, Business Admin, Woodwork, Metalwork, Information Technology and Life Sciences. As of 2008 the school band is offered to year 9/10 as an elective line instead of 8:30 – 9:00 am every week.

Streaming occurs in Years 9 and 10 to prepare the students for college.

The senior campus of Caroline Chisholm School has four subschools, one for each year. Each subschool has its own building with classrooms and an assembly hall with one executive teacher, and two deputy principles having responsibility for student welfare. The school was designed with each building in a square and streets between each square facilitating the schools organisation. The subschool system aims to provide a greater focus on getting to know the students and build cohesion in the student group.

== See also ==
- List of schools in the Australian Capital Territory
