= Narrabundah =

Suburb of Canberra, Australia

- Suburb
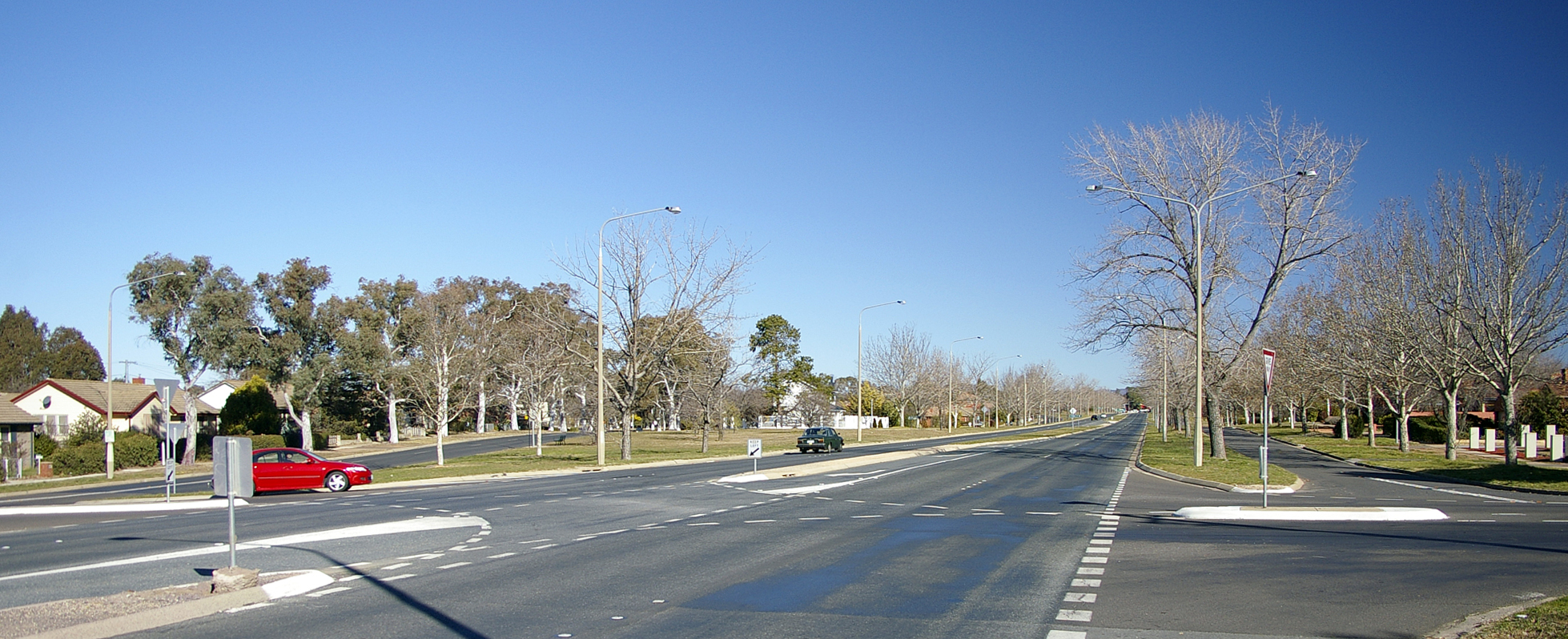
- Sturt Avenue, Narrabundah

- Country: Australia
- State: Australian Capital Territory
- City: Canberra
- District: South Canberra
- Location: 9 km (5.6 mi) S of Canberra CBD; 10 km (6.2 mi) W of Queanbeyan; 97 km (60 mi) SW of Goulburn; 294 km (183 mi) SW of Sydney
- Established: 1947

Government
  - Territory electorate: Kurrajong
  - Federal division: Canberra

Area
  - Total: 4.1 km^{2} (1.6 sq mi)
- Elevation: 580 m (1,900 ft)

Population
  - Total: 6,455 (SAL 2021)
- Postcode: 2604
- Gazetted: 20 September 1928
Suburbs around Narrabundah
Griffith	Kingston	Fyshwick
Red Hill	Narrabundah	Fyshwick
Red Hill	Symonston	Symonston

Narrabundah (/nærəbʌndə/) is an inner southern suburb of Canberra, Australian Capital Territory, It is an established garden suburb, close to Civic and the airport, Lake Burley Griffin, and local centres such as Manuka and Kingston.

The suburb's streetscapes are characterised by mature deciduous and native street trees, established gardens and largely single-storey detached homes. Street trees include Pin Oaks planted in Finniss Crescent, Carnegie Crescent, Sprent and Stuart Streets. Their changing colours and seasonal foliage are a decorative feature of Narrabundah.

== History ==
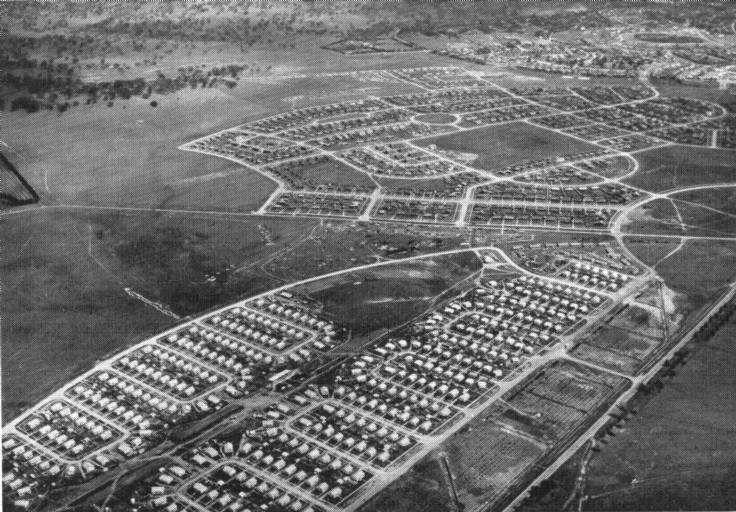
Narrabundah in early 1950s

'Narrabundah' is widely believed to be a Ngunnawal word meaning 'bird of prey' or ‘the little hawk’. This meaning is referenced in the Narrabundah College logo, as well as in the sculpture in the park opposite the Narrabundah shops.

The name Narrabundah was taken from the parish of Narrabundah, a part of the cadastral division of Murray. This parish existed when the land was administered by New South Wales.

After the Australian Capital Territory was established on 1 January 1911, all of the land areas were renamed. The present suburb Narrabundah was part of the original Parish of Queanbeyan.

Narrabundah was gazetted as a division name on 20 September 1928. Narrabundah was the last of the 'inner south' suburbs to be developed, commencing in 1947, after being delayed by World War II. While early Canberra suburbs had mainly been built for public servants relocating from Melbourne, Narrabundah became Canberra's first blue collar suburb, housing mainly workers in construction and printing.

While its first streets were initially named with numbers, street names in Narrabundah have since been renamed, with Indigenous culture, as well as white explorers and pioneers as the inspiration.

== Location ==
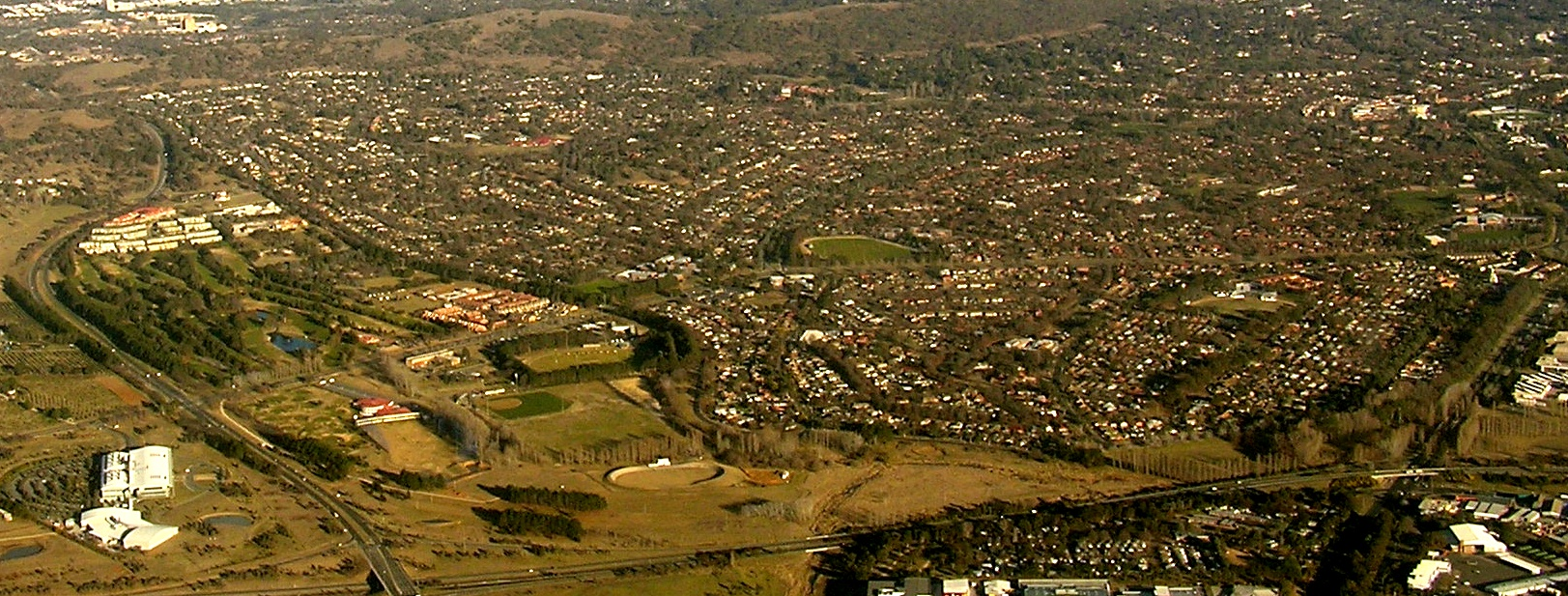
Narrabundah and Red Hill in 2008

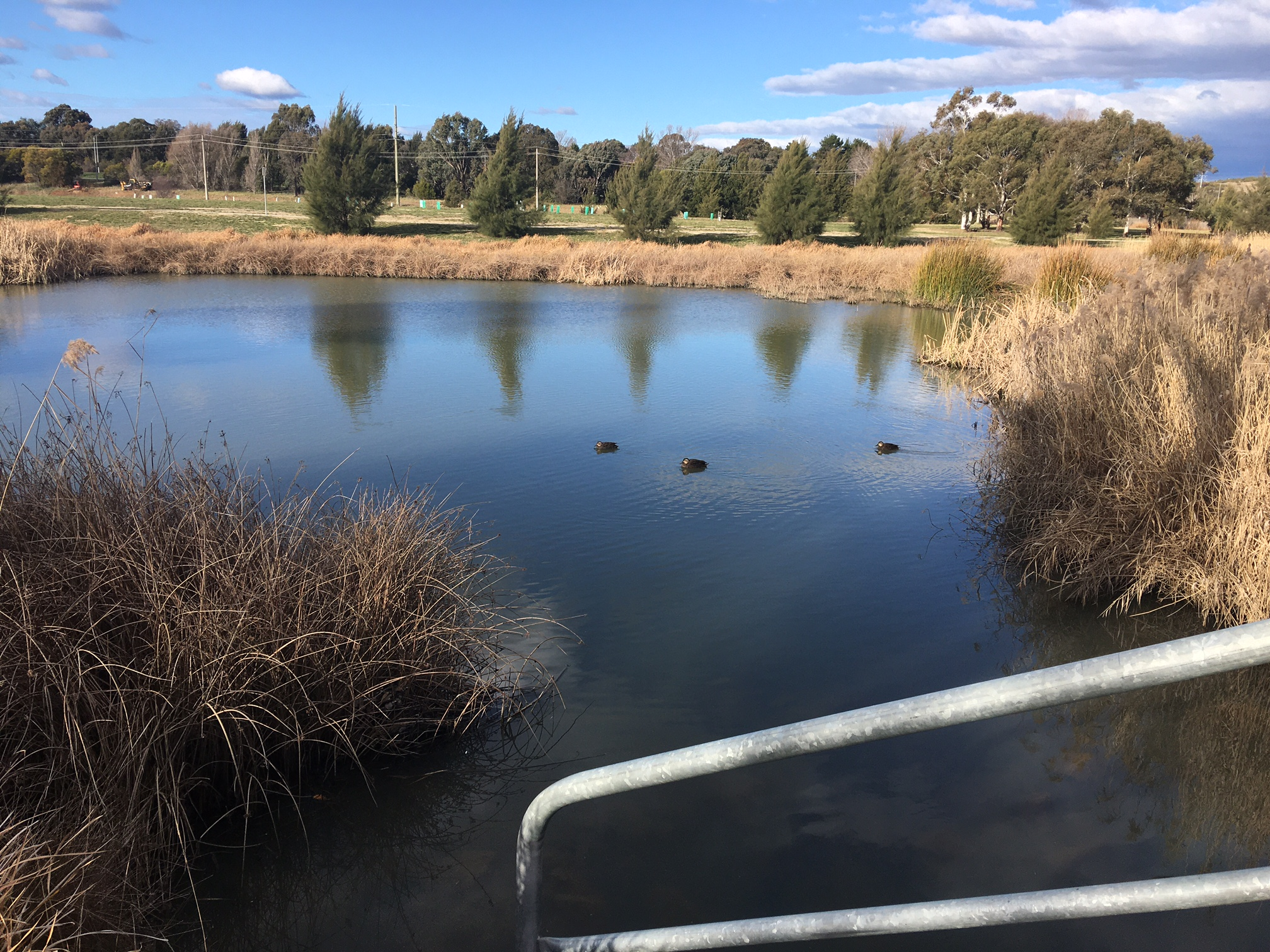
The Narrabundah Wetlands

Narrabundah is bordered by the residential suburb of Red Hill to the southwest, Griffith to the west and Kingston to the northwest, as well as the light industrial suburbs of Fyshwick to the east and Symonston to the southeast.

The suburb can be divided into three distinct areas.

The area to the east of Sturt and Jerrabomberra Avenues (sometimes called 'Old Narrabundah'), where the Narrabundah shops and other community facilities including the primary school, pre-school, churches and GP clinics are situated.

This part is where Narrabundah's original fibro cottages were placed for European construction workers who came to Canberra in the 1950s to help develop the city, along with government printing workers from the British Isles who worked in Kingston and Fyshwick. Soon after, in the early to mid 1950s, full-brick duplexes and cottages were also built, many of which still stand.

The second area, located between Captain Cook Crescent and Sturt Avenue, is near the Griffith shops, to the west of Sturt Avenue and south of Canberra Avenue.

The remaining area (sometimes called 'Upper Narrabundah' or 'Narrabundah Heights') is located to the west of Captain Cook Crescent and Jerrabomberra Avenue. It rises towards the west where it borders the suburb of Red Hill. From here, panoramic views of Civic and Black Mountain, Lake Burley Griffin, Mount Ainslie and other parts of south-eastern Canberra are possible from a number of vantage points. There are also good views to Red Hill and its ridge-line. This part of Narrabundah is closer to the Red Hill and Griffith shopping areas than to the rest of Narrabundah.

Upper Narrabundah is known for its small population of urban peafowl (peacocks) with their colourful feathers. This area was once home to the residence of former Prime Minister John Gorton, who was often seen walking home from Parliament House via Manuka.

== Amenities ==
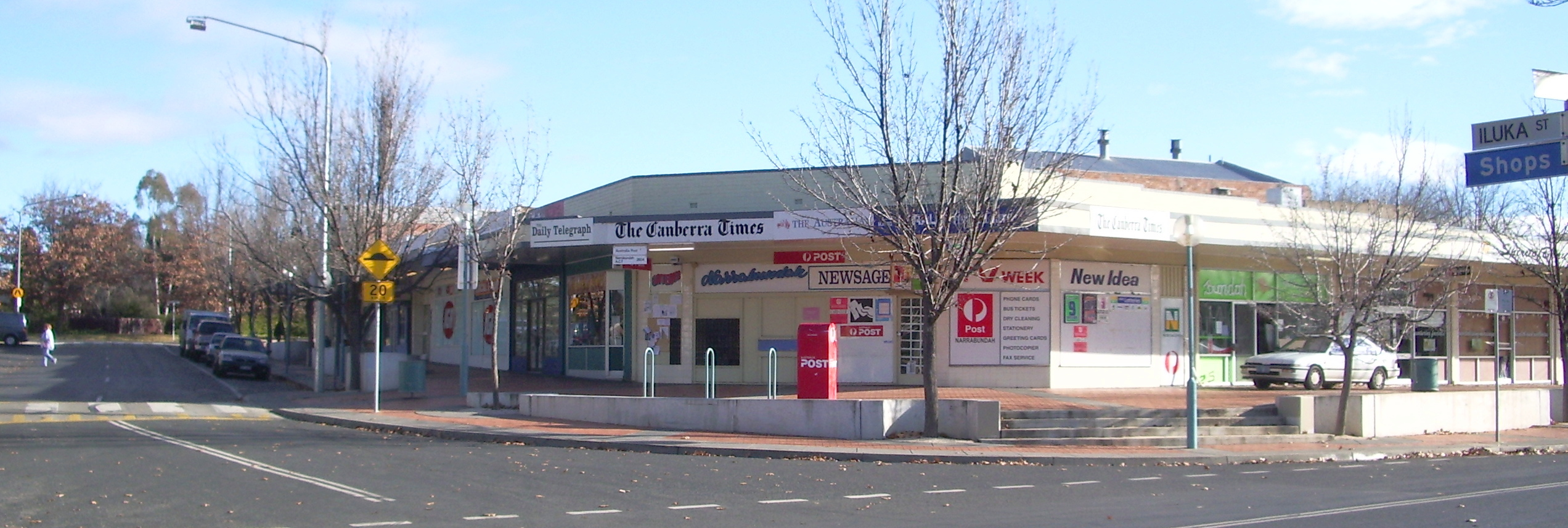
Narrabundah Shops viewed from corner of Kootara Crescent and Iluka Street in June 2008

Parks are widespread, with "Rocky Knoll" or "Rocky Knob" park in upper Narrabundah and its panoramic view over Canberra.

The Narrabundah shops include Canberra's first op-shop Vinnies (Society of Saint Vincent de Paul), restaurants, as well as a real estate agent and property manager, pharmacy, licensed post office, bakery, grocer, two hairdressers, and a barber.

Narrabundah is home to the Canberra Cavalry baseball team, with home matches played at the Narrabundah Ballpark, informally known as the 'Bundahdome', near Mill Creek off Goyder Crescent in Old Narrabundah.

Narrabundah is home to two primary schools, Narrabundah Early Childhood School and St. Benedict's Primary School.

It is also home to Narrabundah College, one of the top public schools for the last two years of secondary schooling in the ACT and the first in Australia to offer the International Baccalaureate.

For community matters, 'Old Narrabundah' is represented by the Old Narrabundah Community Council (ONCC), while most of the rest of the suburb is represented by the Griffith-Narrabundah Community Association. Both form part of the broader Inner South Community Council.

The Harmonie German Club in Narrabundah features a section of the Berlin Wall which was installed in 1992.

== Public art ==
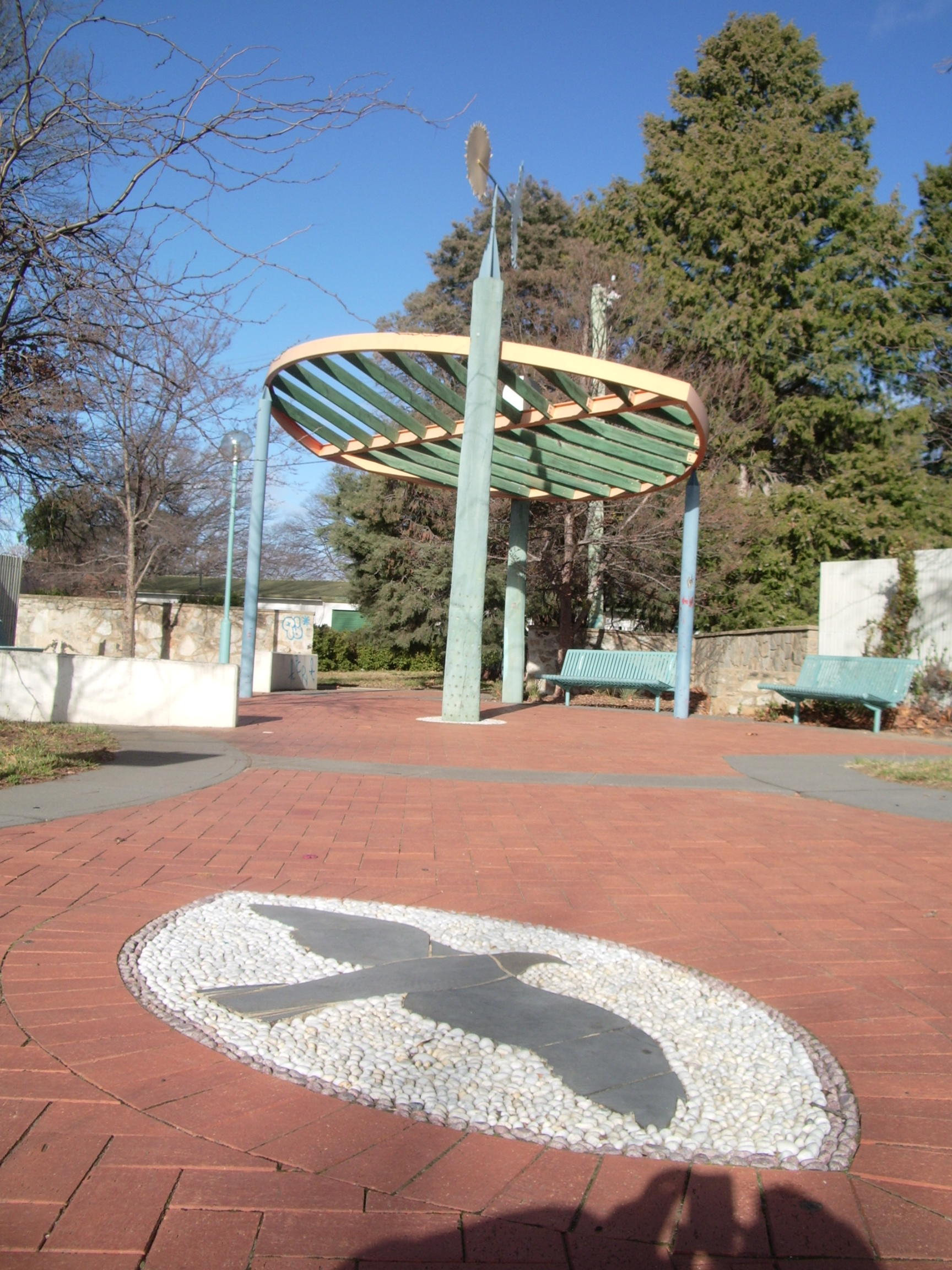
Narrabundah: A Site Marker

A sculpture titled Narrabundah: A Site Marker has been erected opposite the shops with the following inscription on a plaque:

Narrabundah: A Site Marker 1998 Susie Bleach & Andrew Townsend. This Site Marker refers to Narrabundah's social history. Narrabundah means 'little hawk' in the language of the local indigenous people. The steel elements, power poles and pebble mosaic refer to the European construction workers who made Narrabundah their home in the 1950s.

— ACT Public Art Program

== Education ==
Narrabundah residents are typically eligible to enrol in ACT public schools as follows:

- Narrabundah Early Childhood School for pre-school to Year Two, or alternatively Forrest Primary or Red Hill School for pre-school to Year 6, depending on the address.
- Telopea Park School (for the first four years of secondary schooling)
- Narrabundah College (for the last two years of secondary schooling)

== Geology ==
One kind of rock is named after the suburb: the Narrabundah Ashstone Member which is found in the east and southeast. Rocks in Narrabundah are from the Silurian age. Some of the rocks are grey coloured tuff from the Mount Painter Volcanics. This can be viewed in a park on Brockman St. The Deakin Fault runs from Frome St. The fault line is displaced from Anembo St south to Goyder St by a north–south running fault that connects up with the South Fyshwick Fault. The South Fyshwick Fault runs east from the Narrabundah Primary School, separating ashstone in the south from the Canberra Formation in the north. Calcareous shale from the Canberra Formation lies to the north of the Deakin Fault.
