= Campbell High School (Canberra) =

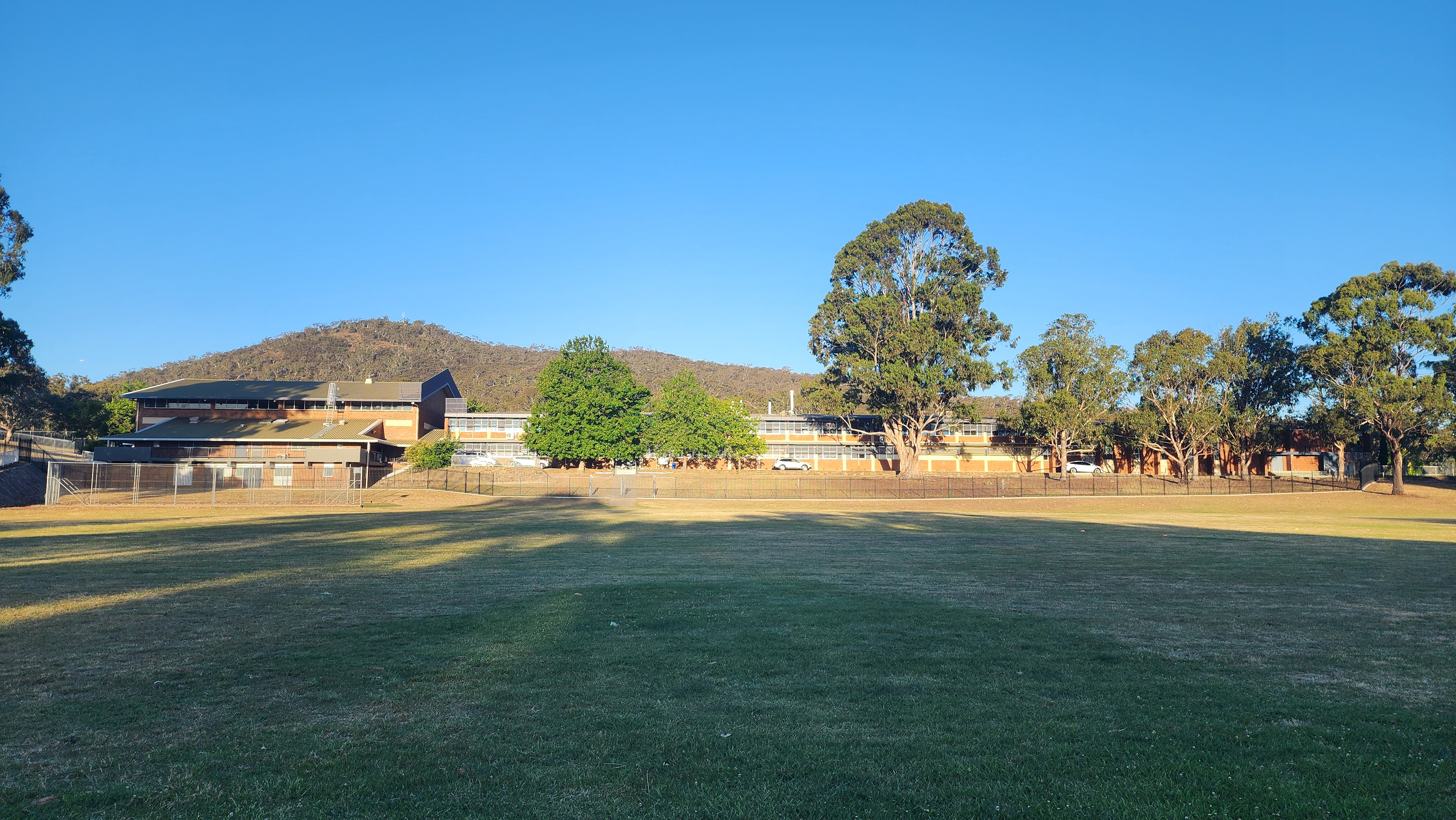

Location
- 15 Treloar Crescent; Campbell, Australian Capital Territory, 2612; Australia; 35.278°S 149.148°E

Information
- Motto: Ne Obliviscaris (Forget Not)
- Opened: 1965; 61 years ago
- Principal: John Manders
- Campus type: Year 7–10
- Houses: Arang, Mugga, Burrayi, Guginyal
- Colours: Blue and Yellow
- Website: www.campbellhs.act.edu.au

Campbell High School is a school in Campbell, an inner suburb of Canberra, Australia, for students in years 7–10 in the Australian Capital Territory's education system.

The school is located at the foot of Mount Ainslie adjacent to the former CSIRO's headquarters and the Australian War Memorial, with the front of the building running along Treloar Crescent, and the school oval facing Limestone Avenue.

The school consists of offices for Student Welfare, cooking, woodwork and metalworking facilities, a large Gym complex, an oval plus access to the foothill of Mount Ainslie, as well as two floors of general purpose classrooms.

== History ==
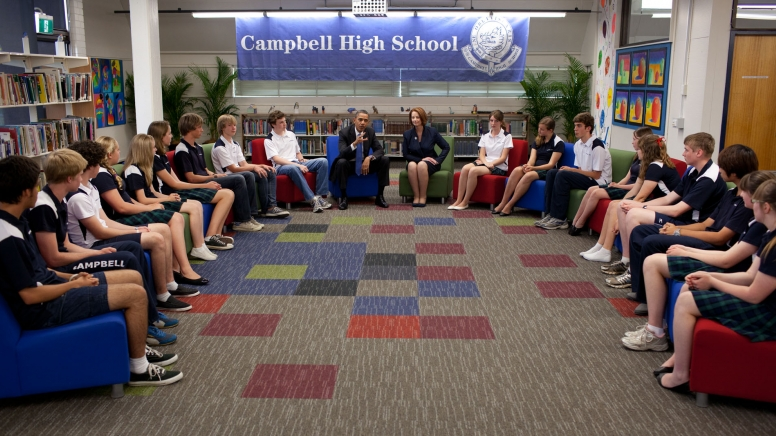
President Obama and Prime Minister Gillard with Campbell High School students

The school was opened in 1965 and was named for Scottish settler Robert Campbell who settled in the area in the early 1820s. The school maintains links to the Clan Campbell.

On 17 November 2011 President of the United States Barack Obama and Australian Prime Minister Julia Gillard spoke to eighteen students at the school during Obama's visit to Australia.

A student died during a Physical Education activity at Campbell High School in 2018.

The school went through a major renovation of the bathrooms and gymnasium in 2024, with the last major renovations being in 2003 and 1999 respectively.
