= North Canberra =

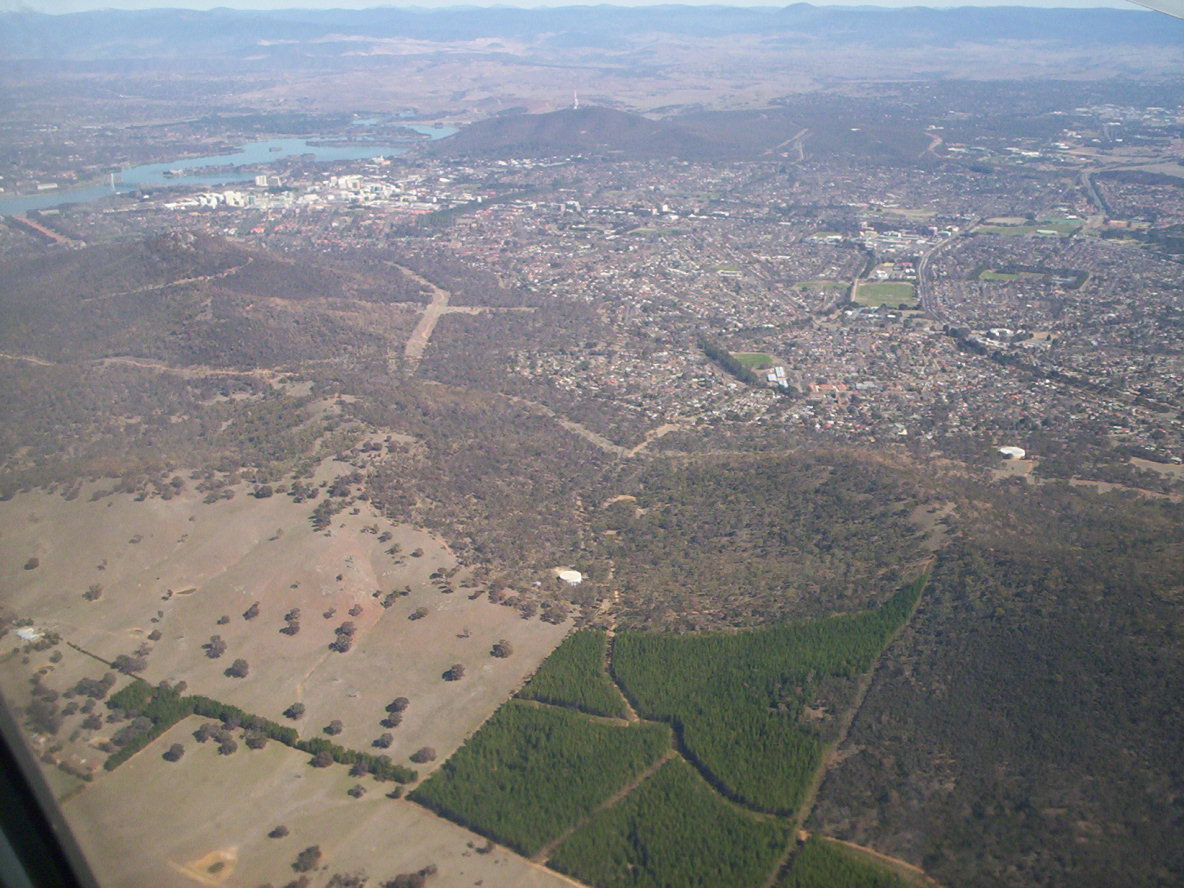
- Aerial view of North Canberra shown from the east
- Coordinates: 35°16′53″S 149°07′44″E
- Country: Australia
- State: Australian Capital Territory
- City: Canberra Central

Government
  - Territory electorate: Kurrajong
  - Federal division: Canberra

Area
  - Total: 37.7 km^{2} (14.6 sq mi)

Population
  - Total: 61,188 (2021 census)
  - Density: 1,623.0/km^{2} (4,204/sq mi)
- Postcode: 2601, 2602, 2612
Localities around North Canberra
Belconnen	Gungahlin	Majura
Molonglo Valley	North Canberra	Majura
South Canberra	South Canberra	South Canberra

North Canberra, or the Inner North, is a subdivision of Canberra Central in the Australian Capital Territory in Australia comprising 14 suburbs. At the 2021 census, it had 26,699 dwellings housing 61,188 people of the 453,324 people in the Australian Capital Territory. Many of Canberra's oldest dwellings are located on it.

North Canberra is separated from South Canberra by Lake Burley Griffin. The two subdivisions combined form the district of Canberra Central and share Civic as their central commercial area.

It is one of the oldest parts of Canberra and is built in part in accordance to Walter Burley Griffin's designs.

== Places of note and interest ==
- Civic is the major shopping and office precinct in Canberra.
- Russell has the main headquarters of the Australian Defence Force.
- The Australian National University has its campus in the suburb of Acton and the Australian Defence Force Academy and Royal Military College, Duntroon are in the suburb of Campbell.
- The Australian War Memorial is also located in Campbell.

== Demographics ==
At the 2021 census, North Canberra had a population of 61,188 of which 49.3% were male and 50.7% were female. Aboriginal and Torres Strait Islander people made up 1.4% of the population, which was lower than the national and territory averages. The median age of people in North Canberra was 31 years, which was lower than the national median of 38 years. Children aged 0–14 years made up 12.0% of the population and people aged 65 years and over made up 11.2% of the population. Of people in the area aged 15 years and over, 31.9% were married and 8.4% were either divorced or separated.

Population growth in North Canberra between the 2001 census and the 2006 census was 6.8%; in the five years to the 2011 census, the population grew by 14.1%; in the five years to the 2016 census, the population grew by 10.4%; and in the five years to the 2021 census, the population grew by 15.4%. When compared with total population growth of Australia for the same periods, being 5.8%, 8.3%, 8.8% and 8.6% respectively, population growth in North Canberra was faster than the national average. The median weekly income for residents within North Canberra in 2021 was significantly higher than the national average, and slightly below the territory average.

== Representation ==
North Canberra is represented by:

- ACT Legislative Assembly: The Australian Capital Territory (ACT) was granted self-government by the Commonwealth Parliament in 1988 with the passage of the Australian Capital Territory (Self-Government) Act 1988. The first Assembly was elected in 1989. There are currently 25 members of the Legislative Assembly (MLAs). Members are elected every four years by the people of the ACT to represent them and make decisions on their behalf. The ACT Legislative Assembly has five multi-member electorates: Yerrabi; Ginninderra; Kurrajong; Murrumbidgee and; Brindabella, each electing five members.
- North Canberra Community Council: North Canberra Community Council (NCCC) is recognised by the ACT Government as a peak community body representing the interests of the local residents, businesses and organisations within the Inner North region of Canberra with the ACT Government. The NCCC is not a local government.

== Demographics ==
Selected historical census data for North Canberra
Census year		2001	2006	2011	2016	2021
Population	Estimated residents on census night	39,438	42,113	48,030	53,002	61,188
Population	Percentage of the Australian Capital Territory population	12.8%	▲13.0%	▲13.4%	▼13.3%	▲13.5%
Population	Percentage of the Australian population	0.21%	0.21%	▲0.22%	0.22%	▲0.24%
Birthplace and language diversity						
Birthplace, top responses	Australia	68.9%	▼67.5%	▼64.9%	▼62.8%	▲66.0%
Birthplace, top responses	China	n/a	▲1.9%	▲3.1%	▲4.8%	▼4.1%
Birthplace, top responses	England	4.7%	▼4.0%	▼3.6%	▼3.4%	3.4%
Birthplace, top responses	India	n/a	n/a	▲1.4%	▲1.6%	▲2.1%
Birthplace, top responses	New Zealand	1.6%	▼1.4%	1.4%	1.4%	▼1.3%
Birthplace, top responses	United States	0.9%	n/a	n/a	▲1.1%	▲1.2%
Language, top responses (other than English)	Mandarin	1.1%	▲2.2%	▲3.6%	▲5.2%	▼4.7%
Language, top responses (other than English)	Vietnamese	0.9%	▲1.0%	▲1.2%	1.2%	▼1.1%
Language, top responses (other than English)	Cantonese	n/a	▲1.0%	▲1.2%	▼1.1%	1.1%
Language, top responses (other than English)	Spanish	n/a	n/a	n/a	▲0.8%	▲0.9%
Language, top responses (other than English)	Korean	n/a	n/a	n/a	▲0.8%	n/a
Religious affiliation						
Religious affiliation, top responses	No Religion	26.7%	▲31.8%	▲38.9%	▲47.4%	▲55.5%
Religious affiliation, top responses	Catholic	23.1%	▼22.0%	▼19.1%	▼15.4%	▼13.8%
Religious affiliation, top responses	Not stated	n/a	n/a	n/a	11.1%	▼7.1%
Religious affiliation, top responses	Anglican	15.0%	▼12.9%	▼10.6%	▼7.5%	▼5.8%
Religious affiliation, top responses	Buddhism	2.6%	▲2.9%	▲3.7%	▼3.5%	▼3.2%
Median weekly incomes						
Personal income	Median weekly personal income		A$647	A$853	A$925	A$1,241
Personal income	Percentage of Australian median income		138.8%	▲147.8%	▼139.7%	▲154.2%
Family income	Median weekly family income		A$1,810	A$2,432	A$2,645	A$3,175
Family income	Percentage of Australian median income		154.6%	▲164.2%	▼152.5%	▼149.8%
Household income	Median weekly household income		A$1,332	A$1,819	A$1,981	A$2,341
Household income	Percentage of Australian median income		129.7%	▲147.4%	▼137.8%	▼134.1%
Dwelling structure						
Type	Separate house	61.0%	▼54.2%	▼52.7%	▼44.8%	▼39.2%
Type	Semi-detached, row or terrace house, townhouse etc.	13.5%	▲22.0%	▼14.5%	▲16.6%	▲18.0%
Type	Flat, unit or apartment	23.7%	▲29.7%	▲32.6%	▲38.0%	▲42.6%
