= Narrabundah College =

Location
- Narrabundah, Australian Capital Territory; Australia; 35°20′10″S 149°8′52″E

Information
- Type: College
- Motto: Discover, Develop, Excel
- Established: 1974
- Principal: Megan Altenburg
- Enrolment: ~939
- Campus: Urban
- Colours: Yellow and black
- Website: http://www.narrabundahc.act.edu.au/

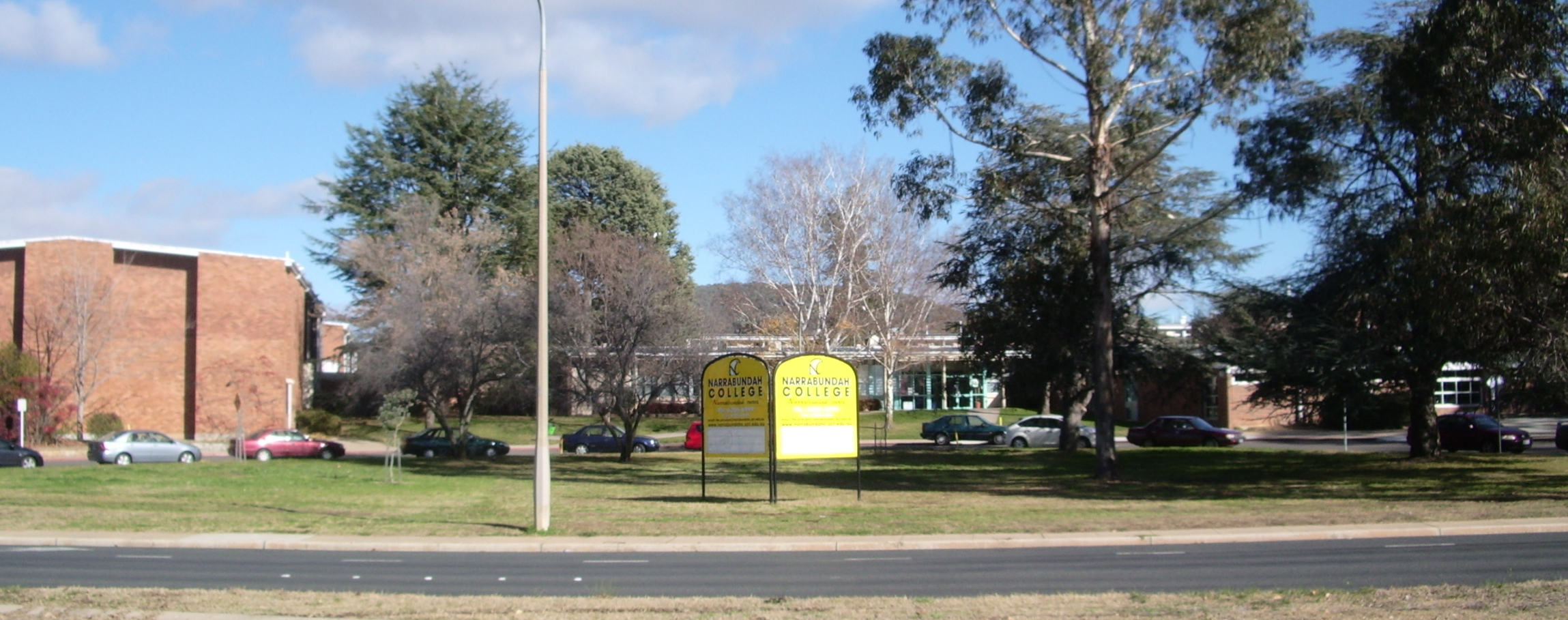
Narrabundah College showing front entrance and driveway in June 2008

Narrabundah College is a government college that teaches the last two years of secondary education in the Australian Capital Territory (ACT). It was the first school in Australia to offer the International Baccalaureate (IB), starting the programme in February 1978.

== History ==
Narrabundah College was formed as a result of the ACT developing its own education system in 1974. The new system meant that public high schools would only teach from year 7 to 10, and that years 11 and 12 would be completed at a separate school. The pre-existing Narrabundah High School was re-formed as Narrabundah College.

Due to low enrolments, the ACT Schools' Authority threatened to close the school in 1978. This prompted the community into seeking backing for the IB programme. The then-federal Minister for Education, John Carrick, approved the commencement of the programme in 1979, ensuring the survival of the school.

== Campus ==
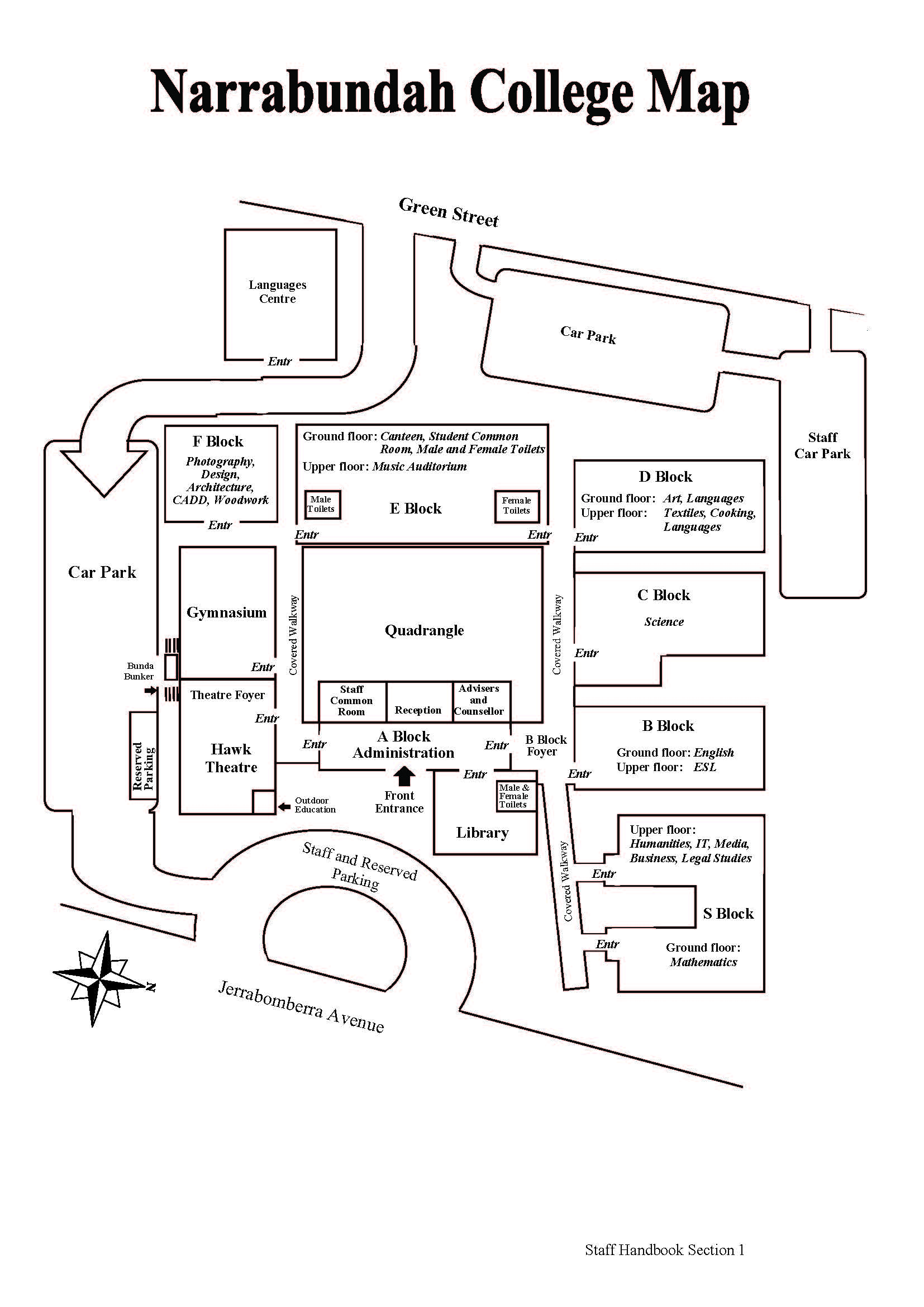
Map of Narrabundah College before the demolition of blocks D, B, and C in 2018.

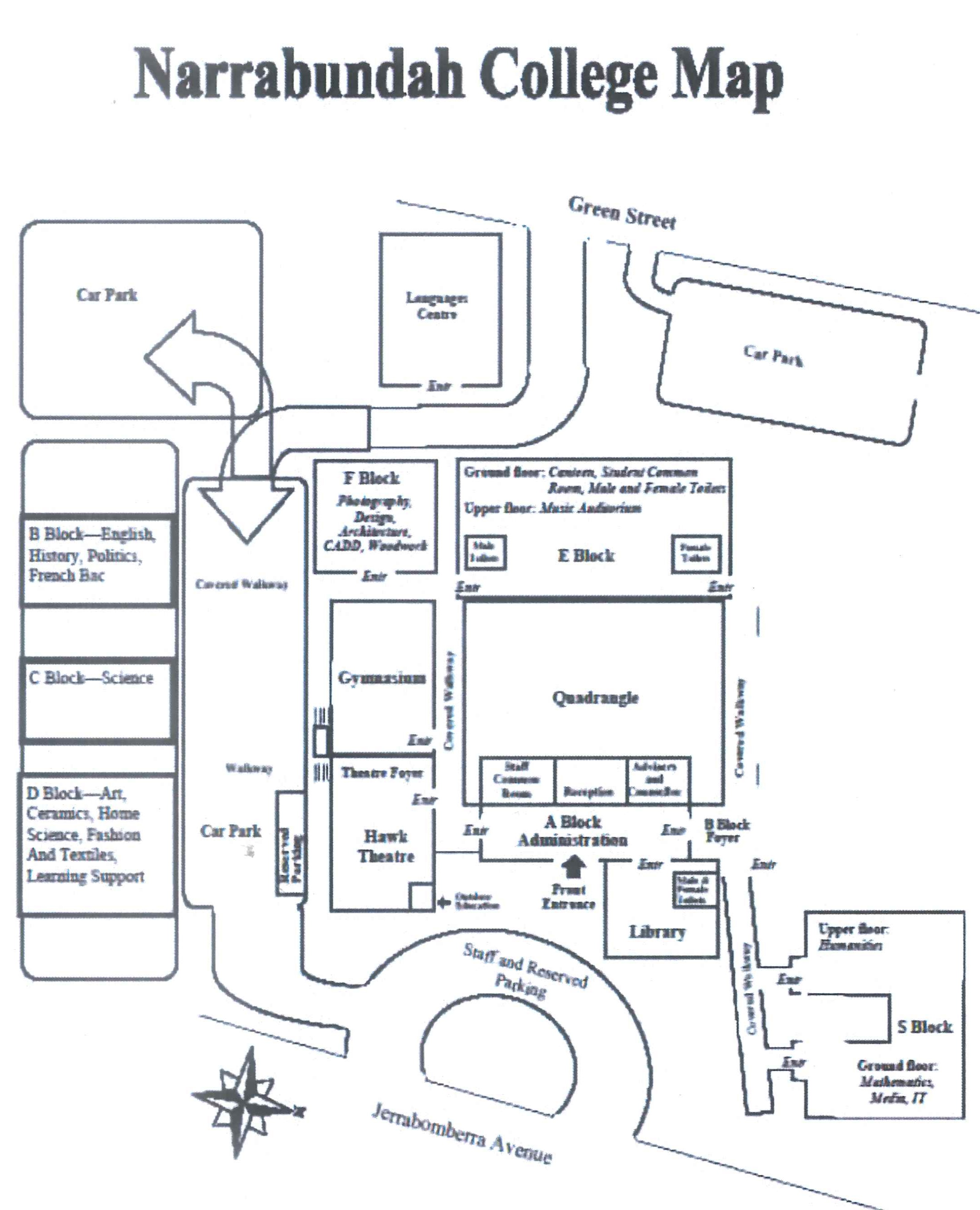
Map of Narrabundah College after the demolition of blocks D, B, and C.

The college campus is located in the suburb of Narrabundah, Canberra. It consists of several buildings including the large "S Block" which was originally the segregated senior building for years 11 and 12 prior to the school becoming a secondary college. Among other things, the school has a quadrangle, canteen, gymnasium, theatre, as well as playing fields.

Block B, Block C, and Block D were contaminated with friable crocidolite asbestos. As such, the ACT Government employed Robson Environmental to undertake regular inspections to ensure the safety of staff and students. Furthermore, the affected buildings were demolished after the 2018 school year, and are to be replaced with modern educational facilities. Transportable classrooms were installed in the college midway through 2018.

== Languages ==
As the IB programme is generally taken by students who wish to study internationally, Narrabundah College has a focus on languages. English as a second or foreign language and TIS (Translating and Interpreting Skills) are language related courses available at the school. Additionally the college offers the following languages:

- Chinese
- French
- German
- Hindi
- Indonesian
- Italian
- Japanese
- Korean
- Spanish

Hindi was taken off of the curriculum during the 2018 school year, but was reintroduced by the 2019 enrolment period.

Indonesian was scheduled to be removed from the curriculum in 2019 due to low interest; however, due to a student-organised petition for the school to continue teaching the language, the college has continued to offer Indonesian as a class.

== Today ==
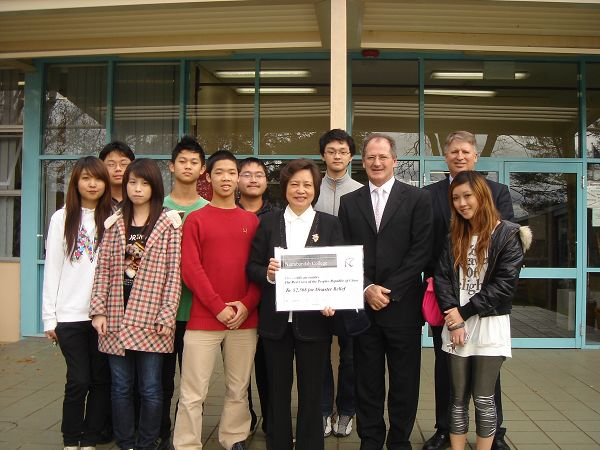
Narrabundah College students, along with Principal, Assistant Principal and representative of the Chinese Embassy in Canberra

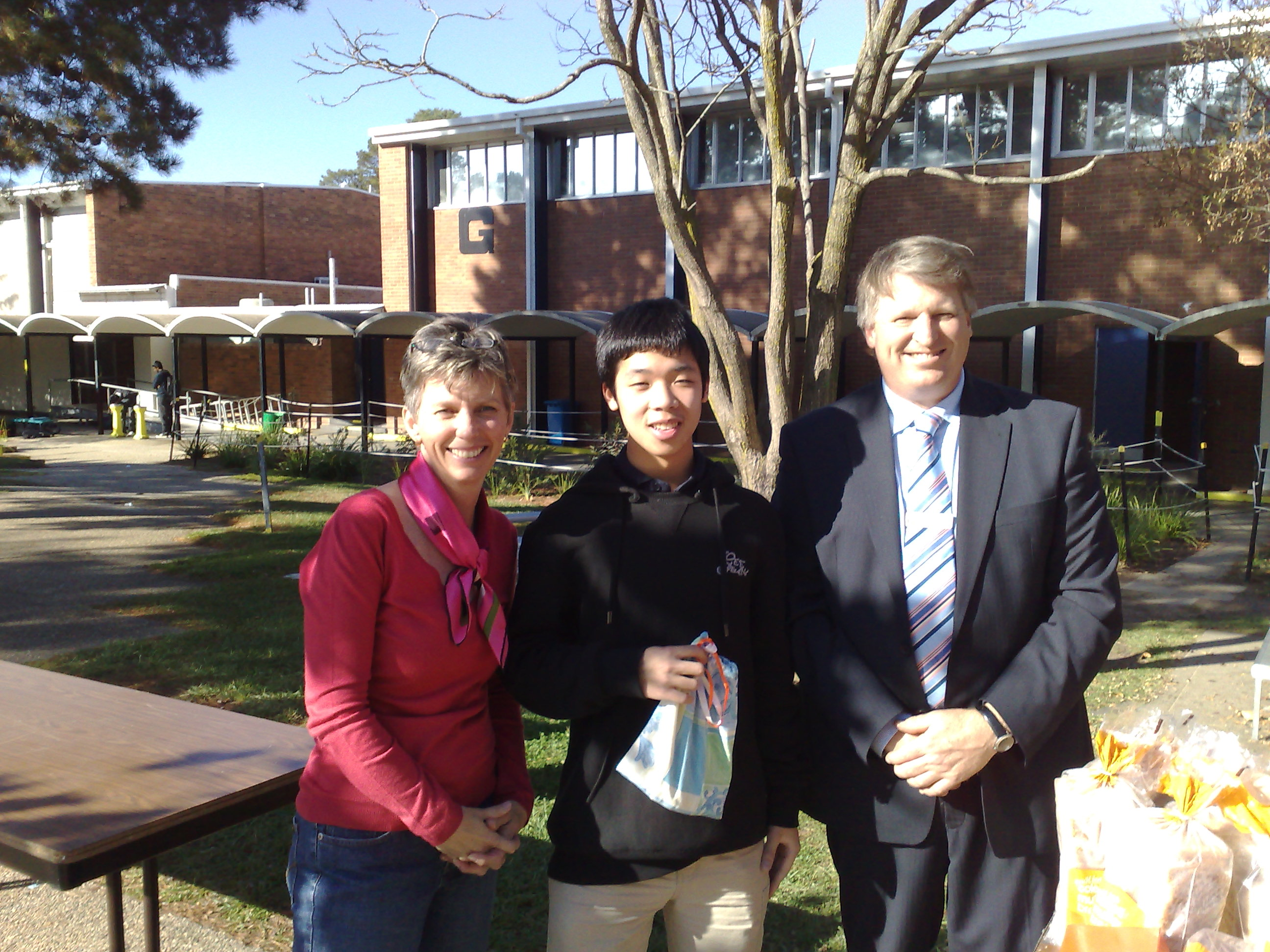
People at Narrabundah College. From left to right: staff, student, assistant principal.

In 2006, 918 students were enrolled at Narrabundah College, which had a capacity of 912 students. While 86% of college-aged students in the college's priority enrolment area attend Narrabundah, over half of total students do not live in the priority enrolment area.

Narrabundah College traditionally performs better than other public colleges in the ACT. In 2017, the median ATAR gained by students of Narrabundah College was 83.7 while the median student at a public ACT college achieved a 77 ATAR. 86.75% of students from the college who were awarded Tertiary Education Statements in 2017 scored over 65 for their ATAR, while 144 students attained an ATAR above 90, and 86 students received a score above 95.

== Notable alumni ==
The following people are notable former students who attended Narrabundah College:

- Tim Ferguson, comedian, television presenter and member of the Doug Anthony All Stars
- Sam Mostyn, 28th governor-general of Australia
- Patricia Piccinini, artist
- Helen Razer, writer
- Ben Snow, special effects artist
- Bill Stefaniak, Liberal Party politician
- Timomatic, musician and dancer
- Greg Walker, multi-instrumentalist (as Machine Translations), producer, composer
- Warwick Fyfe, opera singer

== Sister schools ==
- Hangzhou Foreign Language School
