= Education in the Australian Capital Territory =

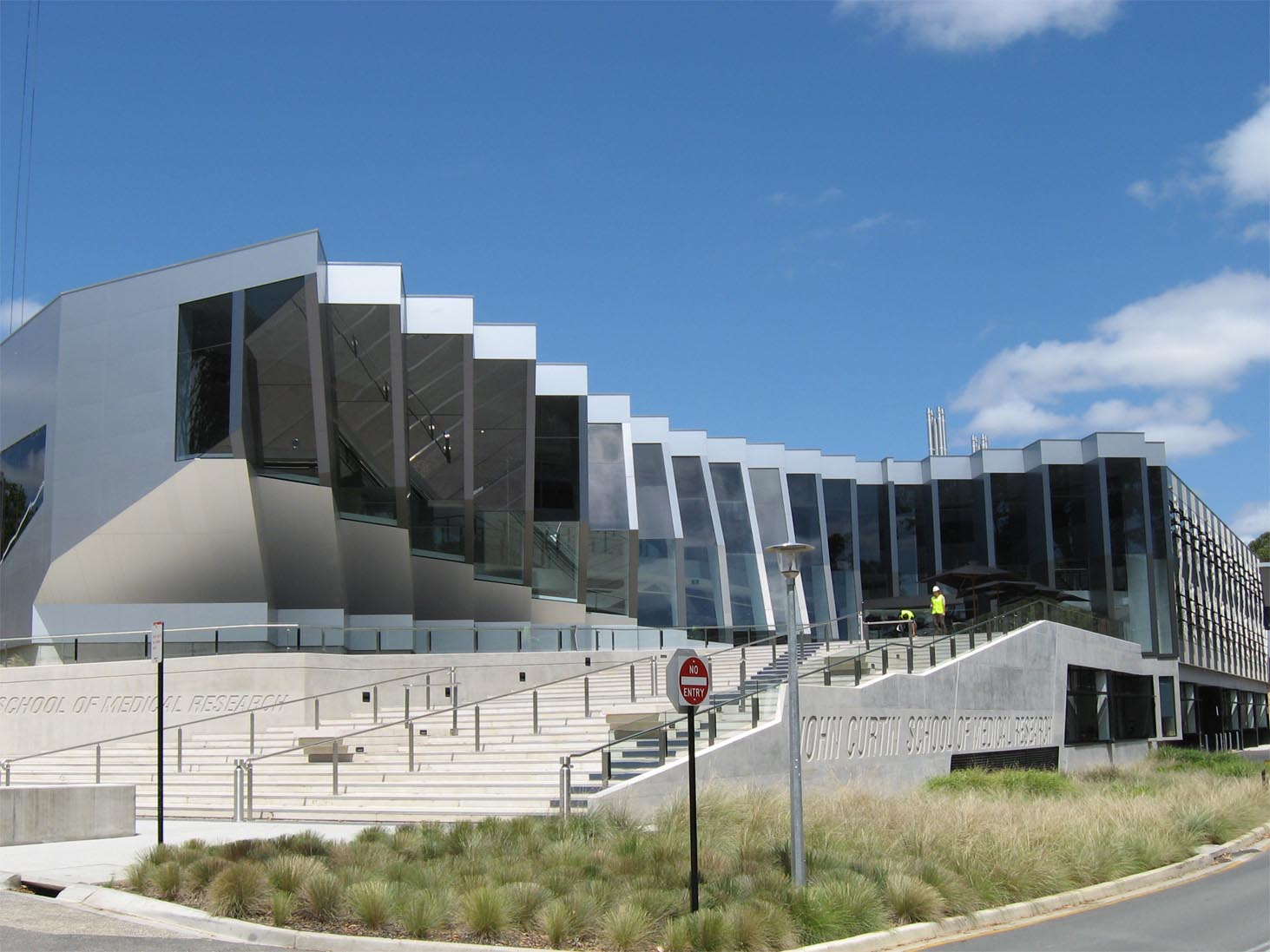
The John Curtin School of Medical Research, Australian National University

Education in the Australian Capital Territory covers early learning (pre-Kindergarten), primary (K–6), secondary (7–10), college or senior secondary (11–12), followed by studies as an adult at university or TAFE. Education includes those delivered by government agencies and those delivered under the Catholic systemic system and other non-government schools.

Almost all educational institutions in the Australian Capital Territory are located within Canberra and surrounding suburbs.

== History ==
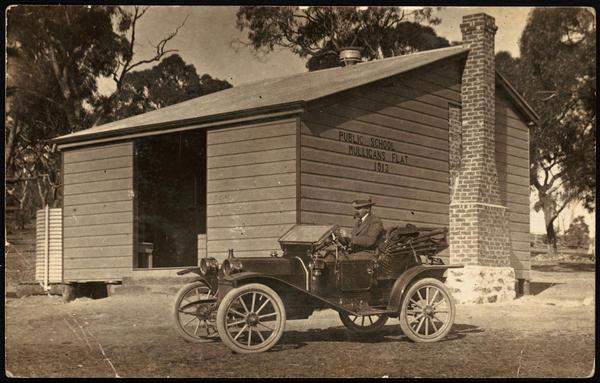
Mulligan's Flat School c. 1913

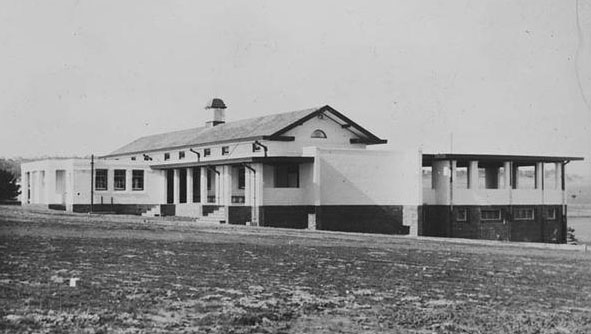
Telopea Park School in c. 1923

The first school in what is now the ACT operated at Ginninderra from 1844 to 1848. A second school was opened in the 1840s at St John the Baptist Church located on the Duntroon Estate within the modern day suburb of Reid. It was the only school in the Canberra region, after the closure of the Ginninderra school until the opening of a state run school at Acton in 1880. Mulligan's Flat School opened in 1896 and operated until 1931 when it was demolished. The remains can still be seen near Gungahlin.

The oldest operating school in the Australian Capital Territory was Tharwa Primary School, open in 1899 in the small town of Tharwa south of present-day Canberra. Hall Primary School claimed to be the oldest continuously run school in the Australian Capital Territory. It opened in 1911 in the town of Hall on the northern border of the ACT. Both of these schools closed at the end of the 2006 academic year as a result of sweeping school closures introduced by the Stanhope Labor government.

The Royal Military College was opened in 1911 at Robert Campbell's estate Duntroon. This was followed in 1986 with the opening of the nearby Australian Defence Force Academy (ADFA). The academic side of ADFA is run by the University of New South Wales.

The first modern school opened in Canberra proper was Telopea Park School opened in 1923 in what was then called Eastlake. Another early school in Canberra is the Ainslie School, it was opened in 1927 in the inner north suburb of Braddon.

The foundation stone for St Christopher's Primary School was laid in January 1927, with the school opening a year later on 26 February 1928. It was located at 55 Franklin Street, Manuka, and was run by the Sisters of the Good Samaritan under Mother Dympna, until her death in 1935. It closed in 1971, becoming the site of the Catholic Education Office.

Canberra University College was opened in 1930, operating as an arm of Melbourne University to provide undergraduate degrees to Canberra. The Australian National University was opened nearby in 1946 as Australia's only research only university. In 1960 the ANU and Canberra University College amalgamated, with the Canberra University College campus becoming the ANU's school of general studies.

== Primary and secondary education ==
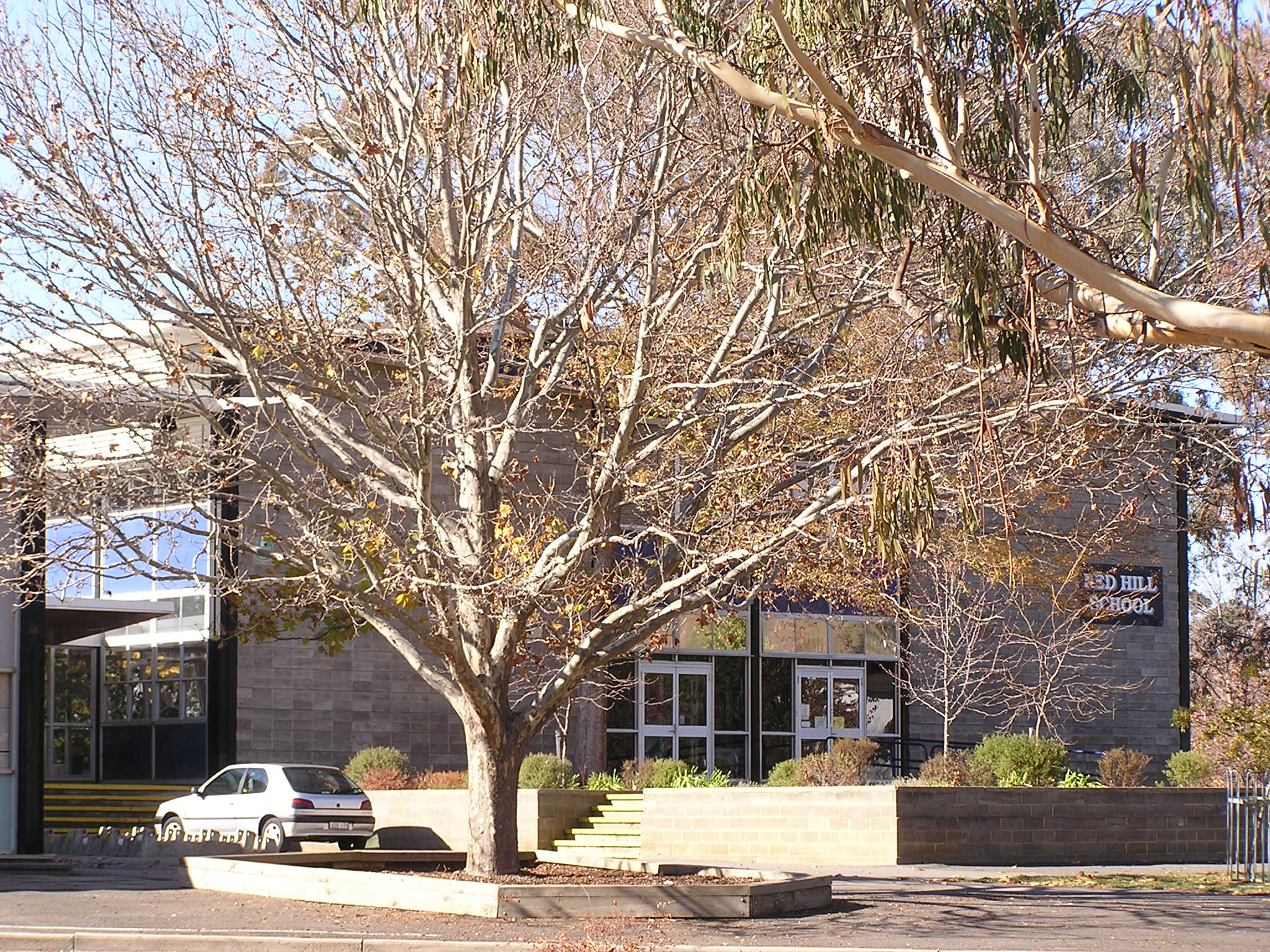
Red Hill Primary School (public / government run)

In February 2004 there were 139 public and non-governmental schools in Canberra; 96 were operated by the Territory Government and 43 were non-government. Most suburbs are planned to include a primary school and schools are usually located near open areas for play and sports. Children begin formal schooling at primary school in February when they are five or six. Primary school consists of seven grades: kindergarten and years 1 to 6. From years 7 to 10 children attend high school, generally a different institution to their primary education.

Students in years 11 to 12 attend college (except for non-government schools where most students stay on at school for year 11 and 12 some choose to go to state colleges) and normally study four to six courses over two years. Year 10 certificates are awarded on the basis of continuous assessment of students' progress at the end by the ACT Department of Education and Training. Year 12 certificates are issued by the Board of Senior Secondary Studies (BSSS) on the basis of course grades in year 11 and 12. Year 12 students wishing to pursue tertiary study must sit the ACT Scaling Test (AST) as part of a required Tertiary Entrance Statement. The ACT Scaling Test comprises three sections: multiple choice, short answer and essay. It used to scale the results of schools relative to each other rather than affecting the marks of individuals directly. It is based on students' general knowledge, critical and analytical skills. Traditionally students intending to pursue a trade have ended their schooling at the end of high school in order to take up an apprenticeship. In recent years it has become common for students with no tertiary education plans to continue through year 11 and 12 in an accredited scheme. Students may participate in Australian Skills Based Apprenticeships (ASBAs) simultaneously with their schooling.

In 2005 there were 60,275 students in the ACT school system. 59.3% of the students were enrolled in government schools with the remaining 40.7% in non-government schools. There were 30,995 students in primary school, 19,211 in high school, 9,429 in College and a further 340 in special schools.

The ACT has the highest retention rate in Australia with 89% of the number of students who were enrolled in year 7 in 1999 were enrolled full-time in year 12 in 2004. This retention rate has declined from a peak in 1994 when the rate was nearly 5% more, probably because of poor job prospects for young people at that time compared with 2004.

During 2006 the ACT Government announced closures of up to 39 schools, to take effect from the end of the school year. After a series of consultations the Government announced its "Towards 2020: Renewing Our Schools" plan that closed ten schools at the end of 2006 with more in 2007 and 2008, while consolidating school campuses and opening other schools through to 2010. The Government paid $750 'transitional funding' to students whose schools have closed, provided they attended another government school, to facilitate provision of new school uniforms.

The communities associated with Cook Primary School and Flynn Primary School lodged appeals through the ACT Supreme Court. While Cook withdrew its appeal within a week, Flynn's appeal is still ongoing, with the community having raised $50,000 for security of costs.

The academic year in the ACT generally runs from the end of January until mid-December for primary and secondary schools. The Australian Capital Territory schools operate on a four-term basis. Schools are closed for the ACT public holidays.

=== Secondary qualifications ===
Until 2015, the ACT's year 12 leaving certificate was the ACT Year 12 Certificate. Since then, it has been the Australian Capital Territory Senior Secondary Certificate (ACT SSC). Vocational Education and Training (VET) qualifications can also be earned.

=== Home education ===
The ACT Government supports home education under the ACT Education Act 2004. In 2000 there were 100 registered home schooled students in the ACT, though there may have been up to another 400 students being home schooled but not registered with the government.

== Tertiary institutions ==
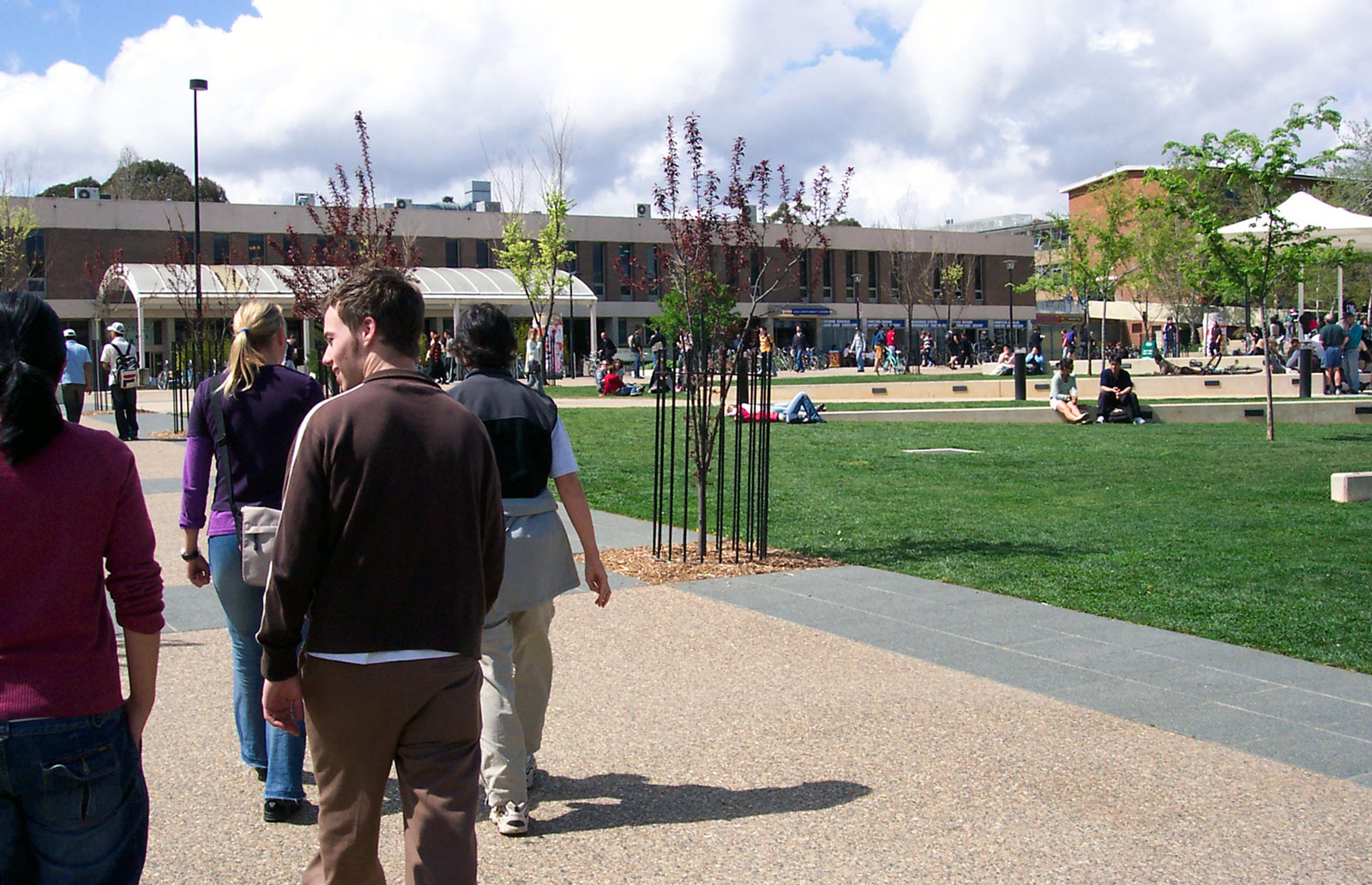
Students having lunch at the ANU

As of May 2004, 30% of people in the ACT aged 15–64 had a level of educational attainment equal to at least a bachelor's degree, significantly higher than the national average of 19%.

The two main tertiary institutions are the Australian National University (ANU) in Acton and the University of Canberra (UC) in Bruce. The ANU was established as a research university in 1946, although expanded to include undergraduate teaching in 1960 it continues to have a strong research focus. The THES - QS World University Rankings in 2006, 2007 and 2008 ranked the ANU as being the 16th best university in the world. Both ANU and UC also have campuses interstate and overseas. There are also two religious university campuses in Canberra: Signadou in the North Canberra suburb of Watson is a campus of the Australian Catholic University; St Mark's Theological College adjacent to the Parliament House is a campus of Charles Sturt University.

The Royal Military College, Duntroon (RMC) is in the suburb of Campbell in Canberra's inner northeast. Duntroon provides Australian Army Officer training. The Australian Defence Force also runs the Australian Defence College with two campuses, the Australian Defence Force Academy (ADFA) in Campbell and the other near Weston which provides education for senior members of the forces. ADFA teaches military undergraduates and postgraduates and is officially a campus of the University of New South Wales.

Tertiary level vocational education is also available through the multi-campus Canberra Institute of Technology. Learning Options is a Registered Training Organisation in Manuka offering a broad range of vocational qualifications in business, government, training & education, management and more. The Academy of Interactive Entertainment (AIE) in Watson is a registered training organisation that offers tertiary courses in computer game development and 3D animation. The ACT Government announced on 5 March 2020 that the CIT campus and an adjoining carpark in Reid would be leased to the University of New South Wales for a peppercorn lease, for it to develop as a university campus. UNSW is expected to invest A$1B in the redevelopment, that will take some 15 years to complete. It will then have around 6,000 students and 2,000 staff. The CIT Reid campus activities are to be transitioned to the new Woden campus.

Alliance College of Australia is a bible college of the Christian and Missionary Alliance. Unity College teaches Christian worship and ministry.

== See also ==
- Education in Australia
- List of schools in the Australian Capital Territory
