= Suburbs of Canberra =

City centre
Town centres
Group centres
Industrial areas
Villages

The suburbs of the Australian Capital Territory are organised into a hierarchy of districts, town centres, group centres, local suburbs and other industrial areas and villages. While these divisions have no formal role in the governance or administration of the city, they have formed a basis for the planning and development of the city and are significant to the city's commercial and social activities.

== Suburbs ==
Most suburbs of the Australian Capital Territory are designed around local shops, centrally located within walking distance of the outer parts of the suburb. Consequently, they are generally smaller in size than the suburbs of other cities. A typical Australian Capital Territory suburb is bounded on all sides by major roads, and at the centre, contains local shops, or at least a local store. Some also contain a petrol station, a church, or other community facilities. Many also contain a primary school and a preschool.

As a result of these commercial and community facilities being located in the centre of suburbs, the Australian Capital Territory lacks strip shopping along major roads and may appear 'empty' to many visitors. In the older areas, major roads are lined with houses, and in the newer areas they are typically landscaped with mounds of earth and vegetation to form 'parkways'.

== Districts ==
Australian Capital Territory's districts were developed with the intention of being semi-self-contained satellite cities with an intended population of about 80,000 people. The districts contain town centres which serve as commercial, transport and employment nodes. The districts are separated by nature reserves, and in most cases were designed according to a policy of ridges and valleys where the urban areas were located in valleys, separated by ridges, containing nature parks. There are nineteen districts in the Australian Capital Territory, each is divided into between eight and 25 suburbs, but on average about eighteen. Australian Capital Territory's Plan also contains districts located outside of the urban areas for the purposes of land administration.

Following the transfer of land from the Government of New South Wales to the Commonwealth Government in 1911, eighteen original districts were established in 1966 by the Commonwealth via the gazettal of the Districts Ordinance 1966 No. 5 (Cth) which, after the enactment of the Australian Capital Territory (Self-Government) Act 1988 (Cth), became the Districts Act 1966 No. 5 (ACT). This Act was subsequently repealed by the ACT Government and all districts and the land contained within are now administered subject to the Districts Act 2002 (ACT).

In chronological order of mass development, the districts are:

Selected historical data for the districts of the Australian Capital Territory
Districts		Gazettal date	First settled	Number of suburbs	Estimated residents at census				
Districts		Gazettal date	First settled	Number of suburbs	2001	2006	2011	2016 (Note: Population for the 2016 census is from Statistical Area Level 3 (SA3) measurements – while earlier census population area counts in this table may have used different boundaries or area levels)	2021
Canberra Central	North Canberra	12 May 1966	1928	25	39,438	42,113	48,030	53,002	61,188
Canberra Central	South Canberra	12 May 1966	1927	25	24,139	23,668	24,154	27,007	31,592
Woden Valley		12 May 1966	1963	12	31,336	31,992	32,958	34,760	39,279
Belconnen		12 May 1966	1967	27	81,701	84,382	92,444	96,049	106,061
Jerrabomberra		12 May 1966		4	1,214	830	1,241	1,240	1,425
Majura		12 May 1966		1	347	232	246	174	299
Tuggeranong		12 May 1966	1974	18	86,346	87,119	86,900	85,154	89,461
Weston Creek		12 May 1966	1969	8	22,338	22,127	22,746	22,988	24,630
Gungahlin		12 May 1966	1991	18	23,098	31,318	46,971	71,142	87,682
Stromlo		12 May 1966		0	86	64	71	61	75
Kowen		12 May 1966		0	30	49	34	38	25
Hall		12 May 1966		1	368	338	332	271	298
Coree		12 May 1966		1	416	267	425	356	309
Paddys River		12 May 1966		1	2001–2011: included in Coree			150	158
Cotter River		12 May 1966		0				0	0
Tennent		12 May 1966		0				0	0
Rendezvous Creek		12 May 1966		0				0	0
Booth		12 May 1966		0	2001–2011: included in Coree			31	64
Mount Clear		12 May 1966		0				0	0
Molonglo Valley		14 October 2010	2010	13 planned	–	–	27	4,578	11,435

== City centre ==
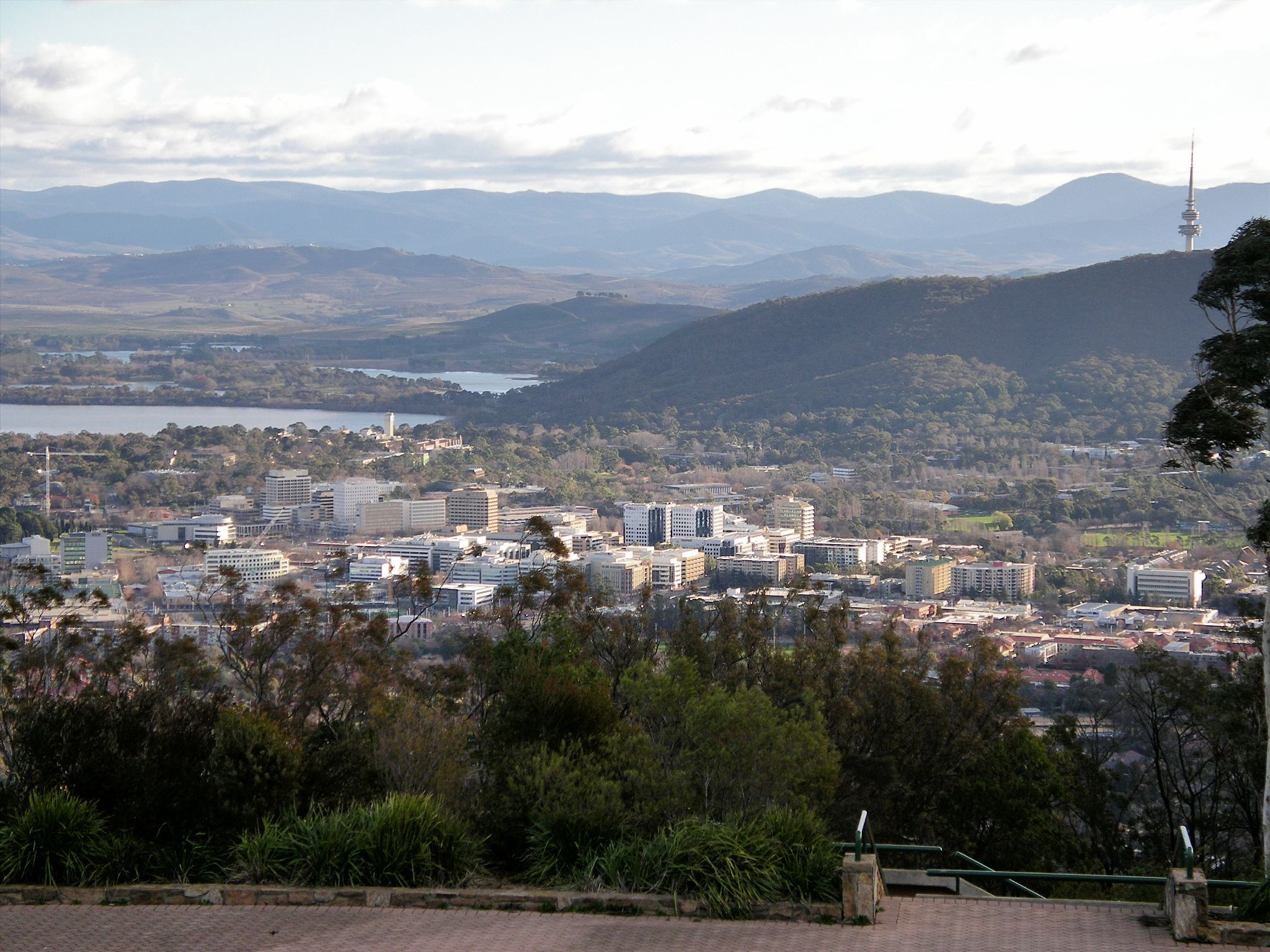
Canberra's CBD – as viewed from Mt Ainslie.

Canberra's central business district, also known as Civic, is the main commercial centre in Canberra. It is larger than the town centres and contains many Australian Government department offices, large office buildings and retail outlets such as department stores and specialty stores and recreational facilities such as cinemas, bars, nightclubs, restaurants and theatres. The Australian Capital Territory Legislative Assembly is contained within its boundaries; as is the Canberra Theatre and Playhouse, Territory Courts, and the Federal Court.

== Town centres ==
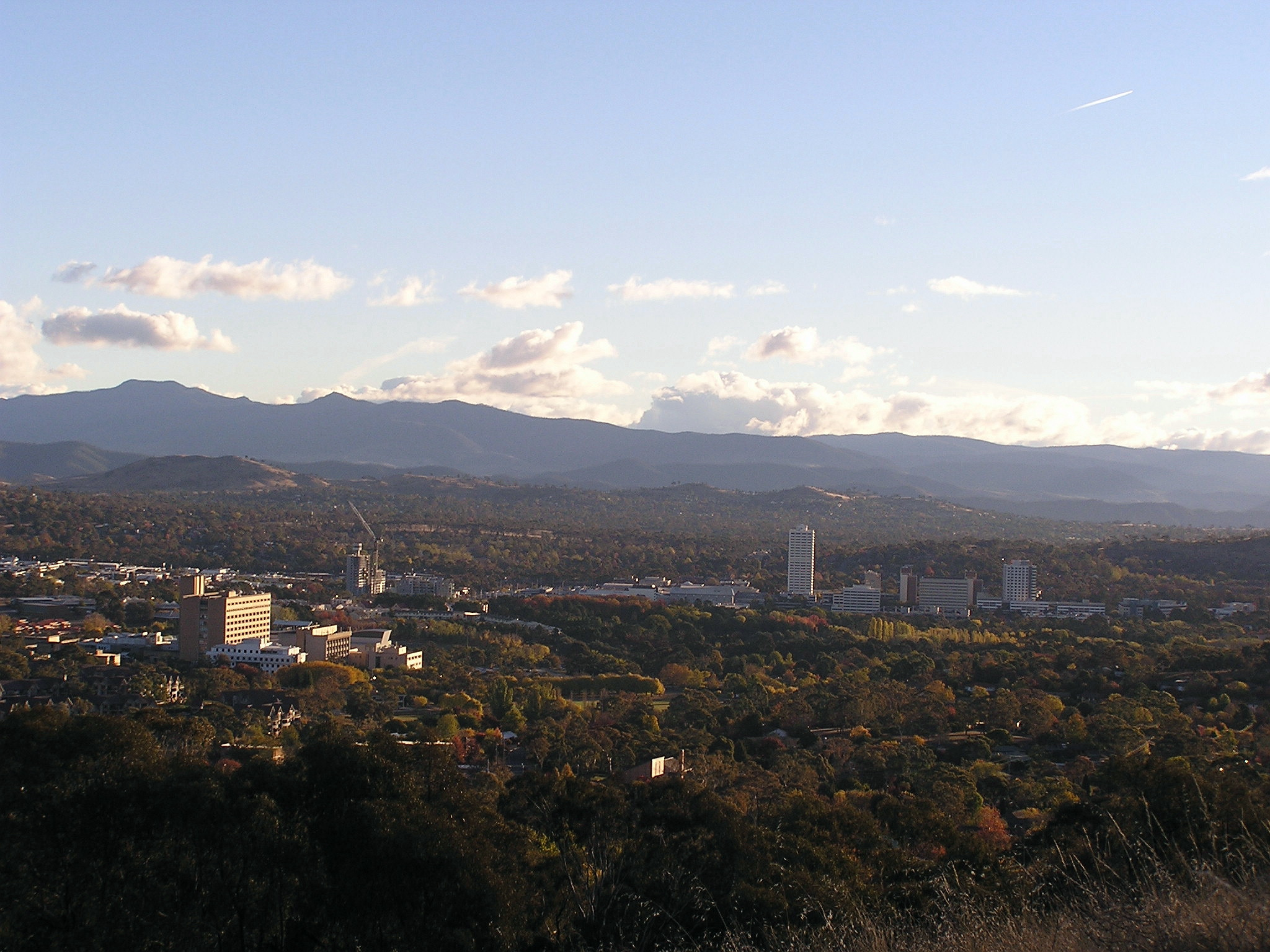
Woden Town Centre, located in the Woden Valley district resembles a miniature CBD.

Outside Canberra's central business district, there are five town centres within Australian Capital Territory. As well as serving as commercial nodes, town centres also serve as centres of employment. Most contain at least one major Australia government department. For example:

- Belconnen Town Centre contains the head offices of the Department of Immigration and Border Protection and the Australian Bureau of Statistics;
- Tuggeranong Town Centre contains the head offices of the Department of Social Services and the Executive Agency Services Australia; and
- Woden Town Centre contains the head office of the Department of Health and the National Indigenous Australians Agency.

As of 2013, neither the Weston Creek Centre nor the Gungahlin Town Centre contain any substantive Australian government department head office.

Town centres also provide services such as mechanical workshops, gyms, pubs and clubs, cinemas, restaurants and fast food outlets, petrol stations and car dealerships. They also usually contain a public library, police station and a community centre. The Woden Town Centre has high rise office buildings and resembles a 'mini city centre'.

== Group centres ==
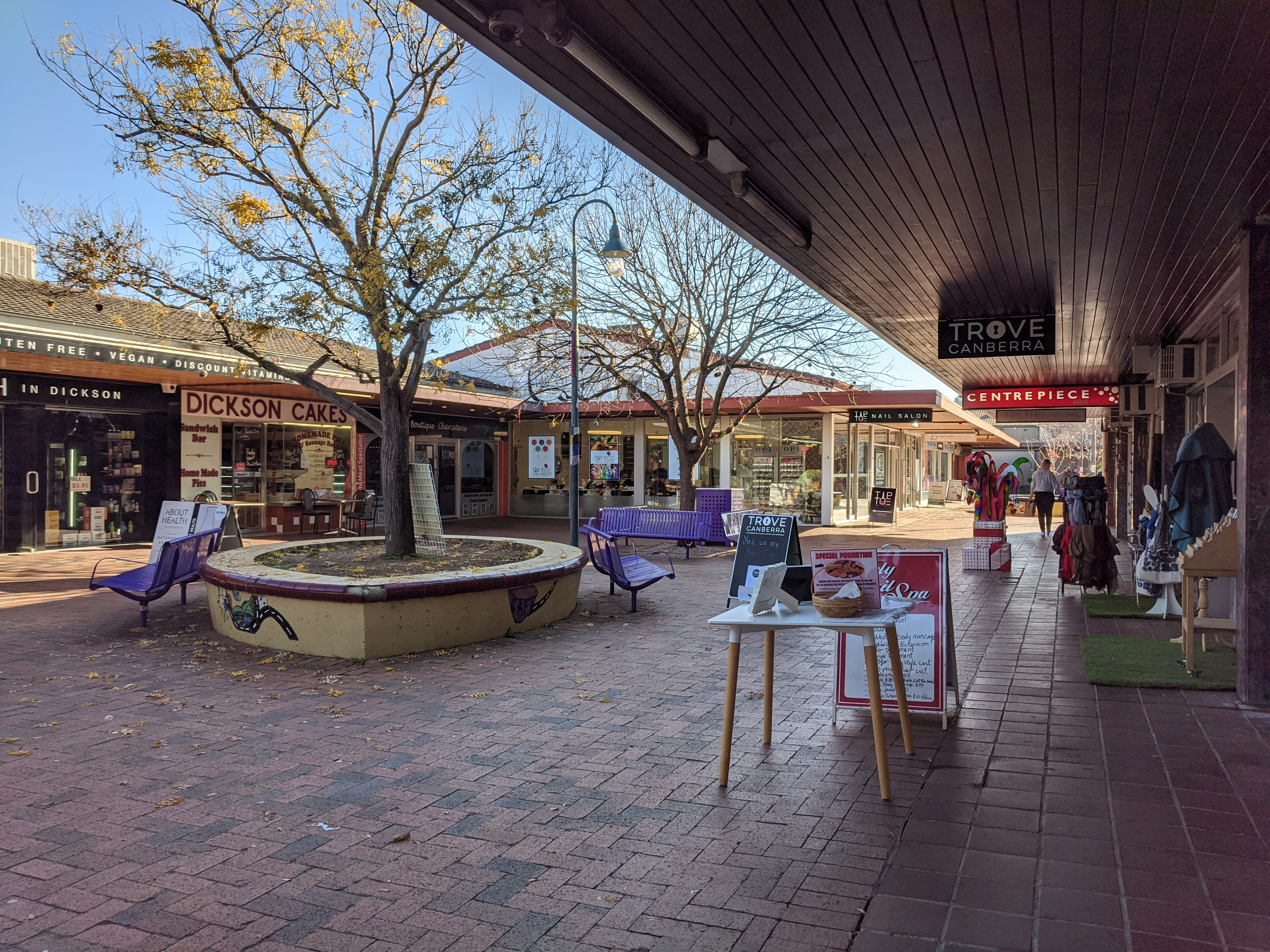
Dickson Centre is one of the largest group centres in Canberra.

Group centres are commercial and community centres smaller than town centres but larger than local shops which are designed to serve a "group" of suburbs – typically about four or five. A typical group centre contains such local commercial facilities such as a supermarket, a petrol station, specialty stores such as a pharmacy, hairdresser, butcher, baker, deli, health food store, betting agency and medical centre. Some larger group centres may also contain banks, a few restaurants and fast food outlets. They will typically also contain recreational and social facilities such as a swimming pool, church, and a tavern or club. These are intended to provide "weekly shopping" type services to the residents of adjoining suburbs.

== Industrial areas ==
The suburbs of Mitchell, Fyshwick and Hume are Australian Capital Territory's industrial areas and are located away from suburbs. While they are the location of light industry (Australian Capital Territory has no heavy industries), they also contain a large number of retail outlets such as furniture stores, hardware stores, car dealerships, bicycle shops, camping stores and wholesale outlets.

== Villages ==
The Australian Capital Territory also contains a number of smaller villages located outside the urban area. Historically some of these are farming or forestry villages and some were damaged or destroyed in the fires of January 2003. The village closest to the urban area is Hall which is located just past Belconnen near the New South Wales border.
