= Division of Bean =

Australian federal electoral division

Bean Australian House of Representatives Division
- Interactive map of boundaries since the 2019 federal election (excluding the territory of Norfolk Island)
- Created: 2019
- MP: David Smith
- Party: Labor
- Namesake: Charles Bean
- Electors: 113,929 (2025)
- Area: 1,913 km^{2} (738.6 sq mi)
- Demographic: Outer metropolitan
- Territory electorates: Brindabella; Kurrajong; Murrumbidgee
Electorates around Bean:
| Riverina (NSW) | Fenner | Canberra |
| Riverina (NSW) | Bean | Eden-Monaro (NSW) |
| Eden-Monaro (NSW) | Eden-Monaro (NSW) | Eden-Monaro (NSW) |

The Division of Bean is an electoral division for the Australian House of Representatives in the Australian Capital Territory (ACT) and Norfolk Island, which was created in 2018 and contested for the first time at the 2019 federal election.

== Geography ==
Federal electoral division boundaries in Australia are determined at redistributions by a redistribution committee appointed by the Australian Electoral Commission. Redistributions occur for the boundaries of divisions in a particular state, and they occur every seven years, or sooner if a state's representation entitlement changes or when divisions of a state are malapportioned.

Bean is a non-contiguous division, split between the southern districts of the Australian Capital Territory and the external territory of Norfolk Island. The ACT section spreads from Canberra’s southern suburbs and encompasses the entirety of Namadgi National Park, as well as the ACT section of the Brindabella Range. It contains the districts of Booth, Coree, Cotter River, Mount Clear, Paddys River, Rendezvous Creek, Stromlo, Tennent, Tuggeranong, as well as parts of Jerrabomberra, Molonglo Valley, Weston Creek, and Woden Valley.

== History ==
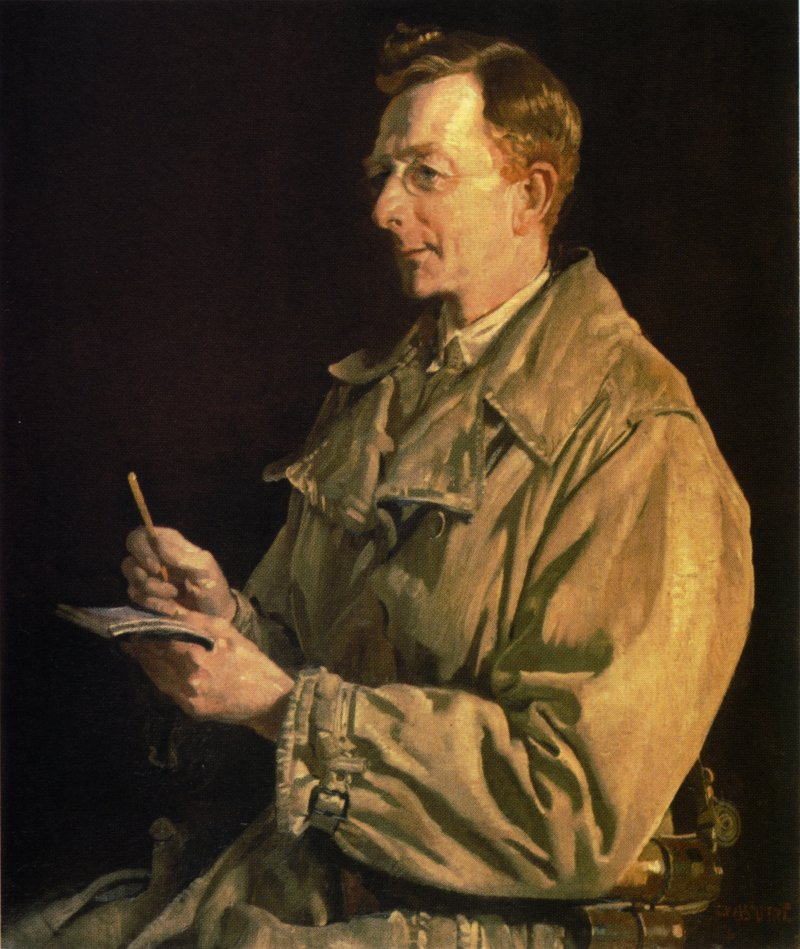
Charles Bean, the division's namesake

The division is named in honour of Charles Bean, an Australian war correspondent during World War I and editor and primary author of the Official History of Australia in the War of 1914–1918.

The Division of Bean was created in 2018 by the Australian Electoral Commission, as part of a reapportionment to establish a third seat in the Australian Capital Territory which occurred due to population growth in the territory. The division is located in the south of the ACT and takes in the urban districts of Tuggeranong, the Molonglo Valley, Weston Creek and southern Woden Valley, the rural districts of Booth, Coree, Paddys River, Stromlo and Tennent and the uninhabited districts of Cotter River, Mount Clear and Rendezvous Creek. The external territory of Norfolk Island is also included in the division. These districts and Norfolk Island were previously part of the Division of Canberra.

From its inception until 2025 Bean was a safe Labor seat - it was held by a margin of 12.9% at the 2022 federal election and a margin of 0.3% in the 2025 federal election with the Labor incumbent holding off an independent.

== Members ==
| Image | Member | Party | Term | Notes |
|---|---|---|---|---|
| | David Smith (1970–) | Labor | 18 May 2019 – present | Previously a member of the Senate. Incumbent |

== Election results ==
2025 Australian federal election: Bean
| Party | Candidate | Votes | % | ±% |
|---|---|---|---|---|
| Labor | David Smith | 42,158 | 41.05 | −0.68 |
| Independent | Jessie Price | 27,120 | 26.41 | +26.41 |
| Liberal | David Lamerton | 23,665 | 23.04 | −6.68 |
| Greens | Sam Carter | 9,757 | 9.50 | −5.30 |
| Total formal votes | | 102,700 | 97.47 | +0.35 |
| Informal votes | | 2,670 | 2.53 | −0.35 |
| Turnout | | 105,370 | 92.53 | −0.05 |
Notional two-party-preferred count
| Labor | David Smith | 71,161 | 69.29 | +6.34 |
| Liberal | David Lamerton | 31,539 | 30.71 | −6.34 |
Two-candidate-preferred result
| Labor | David Smith | 51,700 | 50.34 | −12.61 |
| Independent | Jessie Price | 51,000 | 49.66 | +49.66 |
| Labor hold | | | | |
