= Tharwa (disambiguation) =

Tharwa may refer to:

- The Tharwa Foundation, a nonprofit organization to advance democracy, development, and diversity in the Middle East
- Tharwa, a village 35 kilometres outside Canberra, Australia
- Tharwa Primary School, a former school in Tharwa, Australia
