= John Casey (Australian convict) =

John Casey (died 1882) was an Irish rebel, who was caught and tried in 1824 and transported to Australia in 1826. He won his freedom by helping capture the bushranger, John Tennant, in 1828 and became one of the early pioneers of the Gundaroo district. John Casey came from Loughmoe in County Tipperary.

== Biography ==
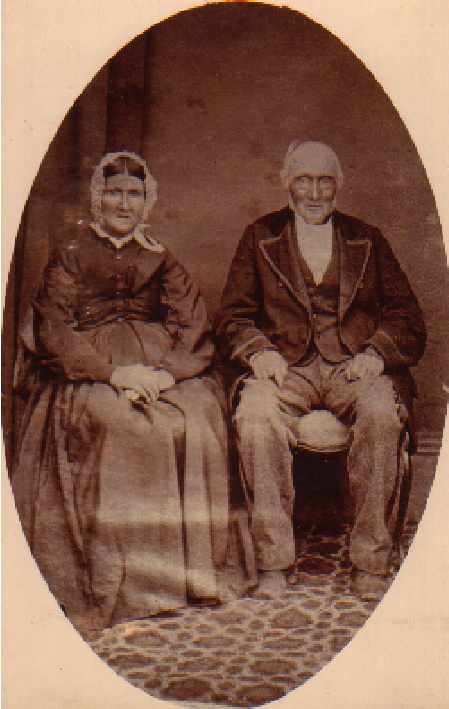
Emancipated convicts, John Casey and Caroline Purcell, pioneers of Gundaroo, c.1870

In 1824 he was convicted at Cashel of insurrection and seems to have been involved in the later disturbances of the ‘Whiteboys’, fighting for the rights of tenant farmers in the rural areas. Casey was transported to Australia and arrived in Sydney in January 1826 aboard the convict transport, Sir Godfrey Webster. In the colony of New South Wales, he was allocated to a family on the newly opened Goulburn plains and worked as a bullocky. During these early years in Australia, Casey's wife and infant children died in Ireland.

Eventually, Casey was allocated to Joshua Moore, who had a farm at Liverpool and a new land grant called Canberry Station in the district that was to become Canberra. Moore was the first European landholder in the area. Casey worked as a shepherd and bullocky at both the Moore stations.

In 1828, Canberra's first bushranger, John Tennant, an escaped convict known as a ‘bolter’, was ravaging the district with his gang. They stole from local travellers, camps and homesteads. Local overseer, James Ainslie, organized a party to capture Tennant. The colonial authorities advertised ‘tickets of leave’ for any convicts willing to assist in Tennant's capture. Casey volunteered. He knew Tennant and his knowledge of the region would be critical to the party's success. After a bloody shoot-out, Tennant and his partner, 'Dublin Jack' Rix, were wounded, captured and transported to Sydney, where they were tried and sent to Norfolk Island. Casey was granted a ticket of leave.

John Casey met his second wife, Caroline Purcell, at Moore's Liverpool station. Purcell was also a convict. She had been working at Moore's station as a domestic servant. The couple received permission to marry in 1832 and were allowed to set up an independent life for themselves at Tallagandra, near Gundaroo. They raised a family of eight children and prospered in the district as small farmers. Three of the Casey sons continued with their father's bullock team and became the main carters of the district.

John Casey died on 22 May 1882 and is buried in the Gundaroo Catholic Cemetery.

== See also ==
- List of convicts transported to Australia
