= Tharwa, Australian Capital Territory =

Tharwa
- Town
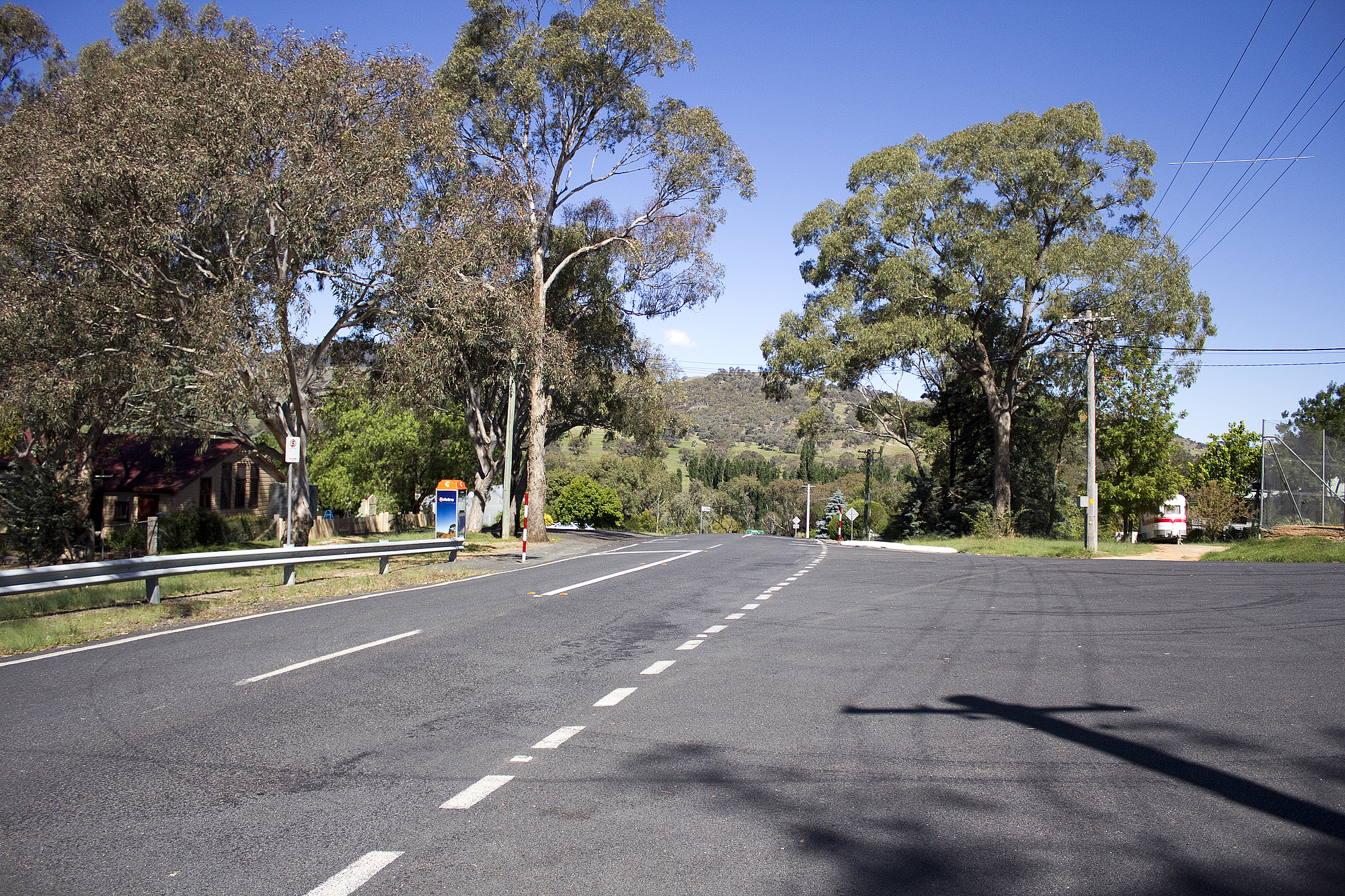
- Looking south-east, towards the Murrumbidgee River, on North Street in Tharwa.

- Coordinates: 35°30′49″S 149°04′10″E
- Country: Australia
- State: Australian Capital Territory
- District: Paddys River
- Location: 35 km (22 mi) S of Canberra
- Established: 1862

Government
  - Territory electorate: Brindabella
  - Federal divisions: Bean; Eden-Monaro

Population
  - Total: 82 (2021 census)
- Postcode: 2620
Localities around Tharwa
| Paddys River (district) | Paddys River (district) | Tuggeranong (district) |
| Paddys River (district) | Tharwa | Tuggeranong (district) |
| Paddys River (district) | Paddys River (district); Tennent (district) | Tuggeranong (district) |

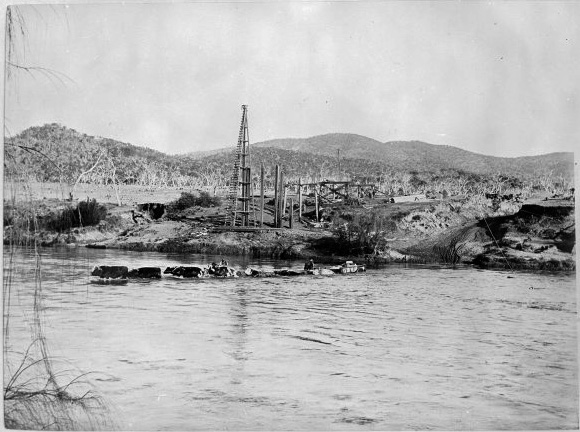
Construction of Tharwa Bridge 1893. Note the size of river before Tantangara Dam (1962) commenced diverting almost 50% of the river's flow.

Tharwa is a village in the district of Paddys River, in the Australian Capital Territory in Australia. It is situated on the southern side of the Australian Capital Territory, 35 kilometres (22 mi) south of Canberra. At the 2021 census, Tharwa had a population of 82.

The village is located on the banks of the Murrumbidgee River and at the junction of Tidbinbilla and Naas Roads, and Tharwa Drive. The main public buildings are a general store, a preschool and primary school (now closed), Saint Edmund's Anglican Church, a cemetery, a community hall and tennis courts. The annual Tharwa Fair was hosted by the school, and was held in May until 2006. The Tharwa Fair is now organised by Tharwa Preschool.

== History ==
Tharwa is the oldest official settlement in the Australian Capital Territory, proclaimed a settlement in 1862. Tharwa was named after the Aboriginal word for Mount Tennent, a nearby mountain peak which is part of Namadgi National Park. Mount Tennent was named after John Tennant, who was one of the earliest and best-known bushrangers in the region. Tennant lived in a hideout on the mountain behind Tharwa from which he raided local homesteads 1827–1828, before being arrested and transported to Norfolk Island.

Tharwa Bridge, opened on 27 March 1895, crosses the Murrumbidgee River. Tharwa Primary School was opened soon after, in 1899. Tharwa narrowly avoided being burnt in the 2003 Canberra bushfires. More recently, the Tharwa community had two further challenges: closures and repairs to Tharwa Bridge due to extensive rot in its supporting timbers discovered in 2005, and the 2006–07 Australian Capital Territory budget announcement of its plans to close the Tharwa preschool and primary school. The primary school was closed in December 2006, but the preschool remains.

The bridge was closed in September 2006 because of safety concerns, traffic then had to detour via Point Hut Crossing. The bridge reopened for light traffic (less than 5 tonnes) in August 2008. Following the completion of restoration works, the bridge was fully reopened for public use on Friday 24 June 2011. The works took two years and involved removal of the old bridge deck and barrier railings as well as installation of new cross girders and sway braces to the permanent trusses.

Lambrigg is a historic property near Tharwa where William Farrer conducted his work on genetic selection for his wheat varieties.

The De Salis Cemetery is a 19th century pastoral station cemetery on the banks of the Murrumbidgee River. It was established by Count Leopold Fabius Dietegen Fane De Salis when his family moved to nearby Cuppacumbalong. The cemetery has a raised circular stone wall to reduce the risk of river flooding, and the site was repaired after 2012. The 19 recorded burials between 1876 and 1903 are marked by four headstones and the De Salis granite obelisk, which is placed inside another stone circular wall.

== Geology ==
Tharwa is in a different geological structural unit than the rest of Canberra, being on the Cotter Horst. The village itself is built on Tharwa Adamellite. This adamellite is coarsely foliated and contains biotite mica. It has been dated at 423 ±6 million years old. This places it in the upper Silurian age.

The outcrop area is extended to the north north west to Freshford, and includes Castle Hill. It goes as far to the west as Sawyer's Gully. To the south it goes close to Angle Crossing, and on the east side is bounded by the Murrumbidgee Fault. The Tharwa Adamellite is part of the Murrumbidgee Batholith.

The latitude and longitude of Tharwa is 35°31'00S 149°04'00E. The geoid is 19.356 metres above the theoretical ellipsoid shape of the earth at Tharwa. The astronomical measurement of the position on the Earth's surface is only very slightly distorted by a non-vertical gravitational field 0.3" to north and 0.6" to the west.

Magnetic declination at Tharwa is 11.817 deg east, total field strength is 43108 nT and magnetic inclination is -66.031 degrees; as at 1 March 2006.

Declination is increasing by 0.004 degrees per year. Inclination is increasing by 0.016 degrees per year (as in the rest of Canberra).

== Notable residents ==
- William Farrer
- Jo Gullett
- Leopold Fane De Salis

== See also ==
- Australian Alps Walking Track
