= Electoral results for the Division of Bean =

Division of Bean: Australian federal election results from 2019-present

This is a list of electoral results for the Division of Bean in Australian federal elections from the division's creation in 2019 until the present.

== Members ==
Member	Party	Term
David Smith	Labor	2019–present

== Election results ==
=== Elections in the 2020s ===
==== 2025 ====
2025 Australian federal election: Bean
Party	Candidate	Votes	%	±%
Liberal	David Lamerton			
Independent	Jessie Price			
Greens	Sam Carter			
Labor	David Smith			
Total formal votes				
Informal votes				
Turnout				

==== 2022 ====
2022 Australian federal election: Bean
Party	Candidate	Votes	%	±%
Labor	David Smith	41,060	41.73	+3.59
Liberal	Jane Hiatt	29,241	29.72	−1.72
Greens	Kathryn Savery	14,559	14.80	+1.71
Independent	Jamie Christie	8,023	8.15	−0.12
United Australia	Sean Conway	2,831	2.88	+0.48
One Nation	Benjamin Ambard	2,680	2.72	+2.72
Total formal votes		98,394	97.12	+2.27
Informal votes		2,915	2.88	−2.27
Turnout		101,309	92.58	−1.20
Two-party-preferred result
Labor	David Smith	61,935	62.95	+5.43
Liberal	Jane Hiatt	36,459	37.05	−5.43
Labor hold		Swing	+5.43	

Alluvial diagram for preference flows in the seat of Bean in the 2022 federal election. indicates at what stage the winning candidate had over 50% of the votes and was declared the winner.

=== Elections in the 2010s ===
==== 2019 ====
2019 Australian federal election: Bean
Party	Candidate	Votes	%	±%
Labor	David Smith	35,447	38.14	−6.25
Liberal	Ed Cocks	29,223	31.44	−5.85
Greens	Johnathan Davis	12,168	13.09	−0.57
Independent	Jamie Christie	7,683	8.27	+8.27
Progressives	Therese Faulkner	2,722	2.93	+2.93
Liberal Democrats	Matt Donnelly	2,540	2.73	+2.73
United Australia	Tony Hanley	2,227	2.40	+2.40
Great Australian	Ben Rushton	929	1.00	+1.00
Total formal votes		92,939	94.85	−2.16
Informal votes		5,043	5.15	+2.16
Turnout		97,982	93.78	+0.09
Two-party-preferred result
Labor	David Smith	53,455	57.52	−1.33
Liberal	Ed Cocks	39,484	42.48	+1.33
Labor notional hold		Swing	−1.33	
