= Hall Primary School =

Defunct school in Canberra, Australia

Location
- Canberra, A.C.T; Australia
- Coordinates: 35.16793°S 149.06931°E

Information
- Type: Public co-educational primary
- Established: 1911
- Closed: 2006
- Enrolment: 128
- Campus: Suburban
- Website: www.hallps.act.edu.au

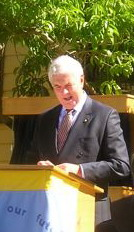
Australian Governor-General Major-General Michael JefferyAC CVO MC opening the Laurie Copping Museum.

Hall Primary School was a rural heritage-listed primary school located in the Canberra town of Hall, Australian Capital Territory, Australia. It was Canberra's oldest continually operating school, having opened in 1911, and remained in operation until its closure in 2006. Administered by the ACT Education Department, the school served students from Kindergarten to Year 6 and had a final enrolment of 128 students at the time of its closure.

Its closure was announced on 13 December 2006, by the Education Minister, Andrew Barr as foreshadowed in the 2006–07 Australian Capital Territory budget.

Integrated into the school is the Laurie Copping Museum that recreates a school room from 1911. It was opened by the Governor-General in November 2004.

The school was originally established in New South Wales and was the responsibility of the New South Wales government until 1913 when the ACT was created. The Commonwealth Government still pays the cost of interstate based Hall students by way of Commonwealth Grants Commission adjustments.

== See also ==
- Education in the Australian Capital Territory
- List of schools in the Australian Capital Territory
- Tharwa Primary School
