= James Ainslie (pastoralist) =

Australian pastoralist

- Born: 1787; Sprouston, Roxburghshire, Scotland
- Died: 11 April 1844 (aged 60)
- Spouse: Betty Catteral (1818–1821; her death) Jya Ngambri (1825–1835; he left)
- Children: James Ainslie b. 1820 Ju Nin Mingo (or Nanny) b. 1827

James Ainslie (1787–1844) was a Scottish soldier and shepherd, best known as the first overseer of the property known as Duntroon in the Australian Capital Territory. During his time on the Limestone Plains he is said to have had a relationship with an Aboriginal woman. After 10 years at Duntroon, Ainslie returned to Scotland and after numerous offences committed suicide in jail in 1844.

The suburb Ainslie, originally a part of Duntroon, is named after James Ainslie, as is Mount Ainslie.

== Early life ==
James Ainslie was born in Roxburghshire Scotland (at the Scottish Borders) in 1787. He claimed he was a soldier in the British Army and fought in the Napoleonic Wars as a member of the Royal Scots Greys cavalry unit. He received a sabre wound to the head during the Battle of Waterloo. This however was unlikely as he later claimed, on return to Scotland, the head wounds were from his time in Australia.

Ainslie married Betty Catteral in Rufford, Lancashire in 1818. The couple had a son in 1820, also named James Ainslie. Before their child's first birthday, Betty died age 25.

== Time in Australia ==
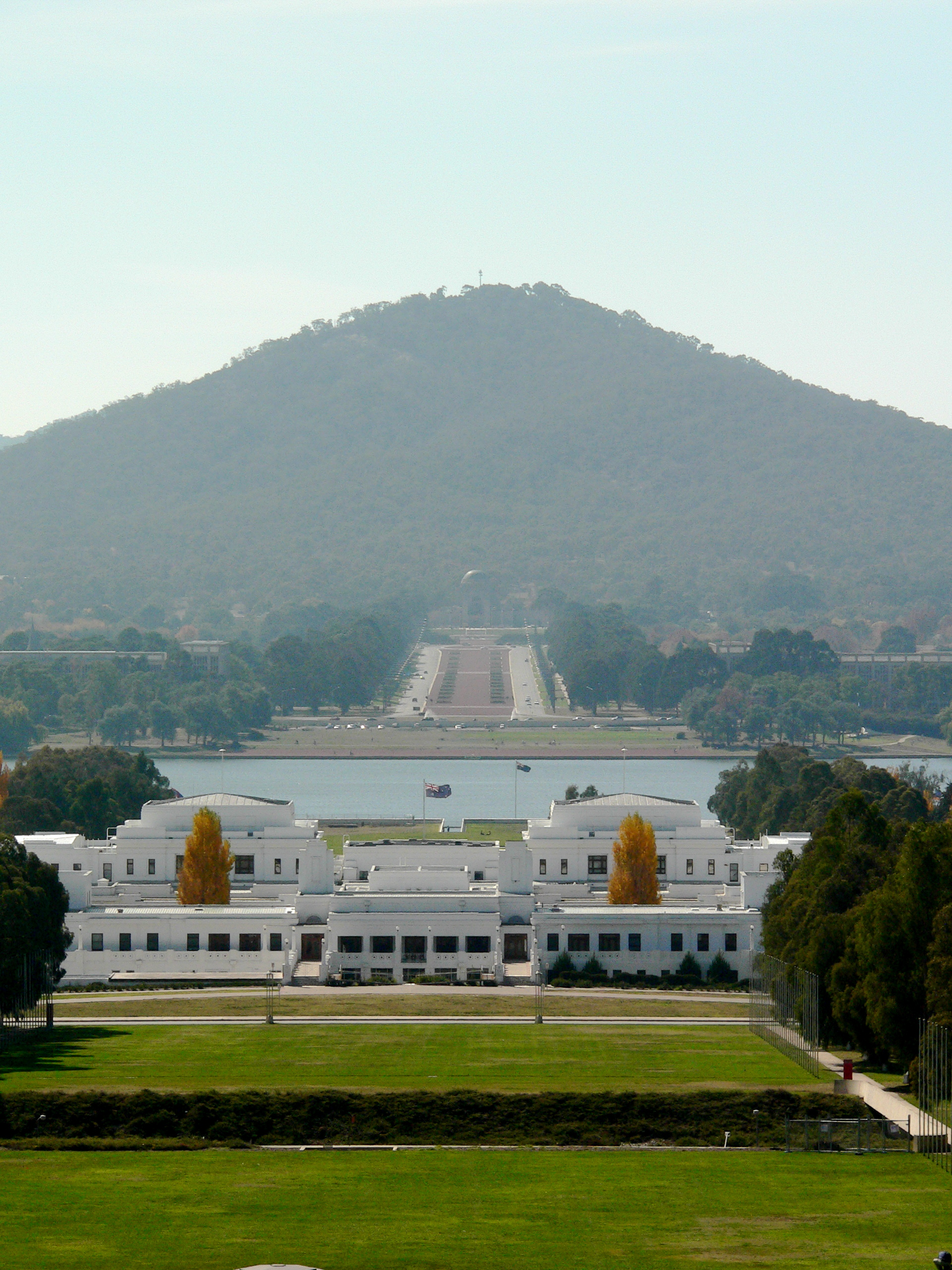
A view of Mount Ainslie from Parliament House. Mount Ainslie is a prominent landmark in the Australian Capital Territory named after James Ainslie.

Leaving his son behind, James Ainslie traveled to New South Wales, Australia in the ship Admiral Cockburn, arriving in February 1825. He was recruited by Robert Campbell in 1825 to establish a sheep station in the Limestone Plains of New South Wales. On his way from Bathurst to find an appropriate site for a sheep station, Ainslie and his convict labourers came across a terrified group of Aboriginal Australians near Booroowa. It is said that the Indigenous people had never seen sheep or white people before and believing Ainslie to be a dead spirit "sacrificed" a woman to him, who they had earlier "stolen" from down on the Yass plains. Ainslie was guided to the south-east by that woman and established Campbell's property, later named Duntroon in the area of present-day Canberra.

In 1827 the unknown woman and James Ainslie had a daughter, called Ju Nin Mingo - or Nanny.

Ainslie ran Campbell's sheep station for around a decade, turning his flock of 700 sheep from Bathurst into a flock of 20,000 (after sales). It was during this time that Mount Ainslie was named after him.

In November 1826, Campbell's station was robbed by the well-known bushrangers John Tennant and John Rix. With the aid of James Cowan and Duncan Macfarlane, who were overseers from the nearby properties owned by Joshua John Moore and G.T. Palmer, Ainslie attempted to apprehend the bushrangers, but failed. In January 1828, Tennant and Rix held up Moore's station and attempted to burn down Cowan's hut. Cowan, Ainslie and Macfarlane with the assistance of four local Aboriginal men and several police constables went out to capture the bushrangers dead or alive. The Aborigines led the group to the camp of Tennant and Rix, where Ainslie rushed into their tent to arrest Tennant. Other members of Ainslie's group started to shoot into the tent, wounding Tennant and Rix but fortunately missing Ainslie. The bushrangers were made captive and taken into custody, with Tennant later hanged.

For his services in capturing the bushrangers, Governor Ralph Darling awarded Ainslie 100 acres of land in 1831. Ainslie later gave away this land grant to the son of Bargo innkeeper.

In January 1835, Robert Campbell announced there had been "irregularities and insubordination...occasioned by a [liquor] Store on a neighbouring Farm" and made it known that he would henceforth pay no more orders drawn by Mr Ainslie. Within two months of the announcement, Ainslie was making preparations to leave Australia. He advertised in the Sydney Herald that he was about to "quit the Colony".

Leaving behind his partner and his daughter, Ainslie sailed on the Edinburgh to Liverpool, England from Sydney, departing 16 March 1835. From Liverpool, he made his way back to the Scottish Borders.

== After his return to Scotland ==
Between 1835 and 1844 Ainslie was often in trouble with the law including for assaults and public nuisance. In 1841, court documents were prepared stating that Ainslie "came home to see his son with the intention of returning to the Colony... but he has not yet found it convenient to return".

On 11 April 1844, Ainslie committed suicide in Jedburgh Castle Jail aged 60. He hanged himself while awaiting trial for a charge of assault.
