= Stromlo =

Stromlo may refer to:

- Stromlo (district), Australian Capital Territory
- Mount Stromlo, Australian Capital Territory
  - Mount Stromlo Observatory
