= John Tennant (bushranger) =

Australian bushranger

- Born: c. 1794; Belfast, Ireland
- Died: c. 1837
- Occupation: Bushranger

John Tennant was an Australian bushranger who was active around the Canberra district in the mid-1820s. Mount Tennent is named after him as it was on the slopes of this steep mountain behind the village of Tharwa where many people believed he used to hide, although this is now thought to be incorrect.

Tennant was born in Belfast, Ireland, and was 29 years old when he was sentenced to transportation to Australia for life in 1823. He arrived in Sydney on 12 July 1824 on the 'Prince Regent'. He was assigned to Joshua John Moore and to join other men, James Clarke and John McLaughlin, who had helped establish Moore's property Canberry or Canberra, the first European habitation on the Limestone Plains.

In 1826 Tennant and another man, John Ricks, absconded from their assigned landholder and took to the bush. In July 1827 Tennant's gang raided Rose's outstation at the Yass River, between Murrumbateman and Gunning. Tennant was shot in the back by James Farrell. During his recuperation, he teamed up with a female bushranger, Mrs Winter. Tennant, Ricks and another man held up Pialligo station on 21 November 1827, robbing it of supplies and stowing them in a hollow tree. When collecting them, two days later they were surprised and almost captured by the Pialligo and Canberry overseers. After other robberies, they tortured James Farrell in late December 1827. Two members of his gang (Cain and Murphy) were caught near Goulburn and Tennant and Ricks were sighted near Canberry by John Casey. The authorities were now closing in on him.

== Capture ==
On 8 January 1828, about 2 a.m., Mr. J. J. Moore's station was stuck up by Tennant and Rix, and all his men rounded up and placed under guard. Mr. Cowan, awakened by the noise, jumped out of bed and armed himself with a musket and handing another to his hutkeeper, William Waterson. The bushrangers demanded that Cowan should open the door and come out, to which Cowan replied that "he would defend his hut to the last." Tennant, whom Mr. Cowan had been able to recognise (the night being moonlight), "making use of horrid oaths and violent threats," said to Cowan, "If you don't come out of the hut I will burn you out." Tennant's companion, who proved to be Rix called out, "Tennant, fire in, what signifies the life of one or two?" Tennant was as good as his word, and actually set the bark roof alight on two occasions, but probably from being damp the bark would not burn. At this juncture, Thomas Leahy, an assigned servant of Mr. J. J. Moore, appealed to Tennant, saving,. "Don't do that, Tennant, Mr. Cowan never did you any harm." Tennant replied, Well, I will not burn the hut, but if anyone, Scotch, Irish, or English came after them, he would have their lives.

The bushrangers then retired to the men's hut, where one of Mr. Ainslie's men was ordered to get them some food, having partaken of which the miscreants made off. At sunrise, Mr. Cowan went over to Mr. Campbell's station and reported to James Ainslie what had happened, saying, "It was time something was done." Ainslie's reply was short, sharp, and to the purpose, characteristic of the old trooper: "I will go out and take them, dead or alive," Cowan replying that he would go with him. Ainslie, hearing that two constables were at a neighbouring station, sent for and requested them to accompany him in pursuit of the gang, also obtaining the services of four Aboriginals as trackers. John Jones, district constable, also joined Mr. Ainslie at "Pialligo," before making their way to "Canberry," where Constable Fenton, Mr. Cowan, Mr. Macfarlane, and others joined the party. Leaving "Canberry," the trackers soon picked up the track of the bushrangers, which was followed round the north side of a hill into the forest land, the track becoming quite plain and leading towards the Murrumbidgee River. After following the track for about five miles they came to a brush on rising ground, where one of the trackers named "Make-a-cake," called out, "Make a light," meaning that he saw the bushrangers encampment. While the party halted to arrange their plans, Ainslie, unnoticed, rushed into the tent alone and surprised Teannant and Rix. Placing his musket to Tennant's breast, he said, "You rascal, Tennant! If you move I will put the contents of the piece through your heart." At this moment, in ignorance that Ainslie was in the tent, three shots were fired, which wounded Tennant in the neck, face, and hands, and Rix in the knee, but Ainslie escaped injury, promptly shouting, "Cease firing, the men are fast." Mr. Macfarlane promptly rushed to Ainslie's assistance, relieving him of Tennant, whom he gave in charge to Constable Jones. A large quantity of stolen property was recovered, and among other articles we are glad to know that Mr. Ainslie was able to swear positively to his light-coloured vest with the pearl buttons, and to his nightcap marked with his initials, but with his innate Scottish caution refused to swear to the other items, as they had "no particular private marks, though still believing them to belong to himself and some of his men." Tennant after trial, and one of his accomplices in other robberies, were found guilty of larceny and hanged, while Rix, for some reason was found not guilty. James Ainslie later received a grant of 100 acres as a reward for assisting to capture the bushrangers.

John Gale in his book Canberra, its history and legends described Tennant in romantic terms and is largely responsible for many of the myths attached to him, stating: Tennant descending from his look-out (on Mount Tennent) would bail up (a dray) - but only when his larder or wardrobe needed replenishing - terrorising the driver by presenting fire-arms and abstracting from the loading whatsoever he needed just then and order the man in charge of the team to drive on again. He never was known to use unnecessary violence or to wantonly destroy valuable cargo for what he had no need. Where Tennant stored his booty... was never discovered, not withstanding frequent and ... exhaustive searches to this end. The mountain had numerous caves and mazes well adapted... many never explored.

This description of Tennant contradicts the evidence brought against him when he and Ricks were tried on 30 May 1828 in the New South Wales Supreme Court for stealing and putting John Farrell and Thomas Simpson in bodily fear. Farrell described part of the attack on him: Tennant then said, that they would boy-whip me and not take my life, and as he had a boatswain of his own, I should have fifty lashes; they then tied me up to a post, and took down my trowsers, and Tennant ordered me to receive fifty lashes, which were inflicted by Ricks, with the buckle end of a strap, and when I was ordered by Tennant to be taken down, he gave me three additional lashes; I was severely hurt, and bled very much; the prisoners took an old carbine, and an old musket, worth altogether about 10s. out of the hut, but they were brought back by the overseer immediately.

John Tennant, John Ricks, James Murphy and Thomas Cain were convicted on 29 February 1828 and sentenced to hang.

After having their sentences commuted the men were sent instead to the notorious penal colony of Norfolk Island for 7 years. Tennant served his term arriving back in Sydney and died a year later in August 1837.

== More reading ==
- John Tennant: pioneer of Canberra & Canberra's first bushranger / by Stephan Williams
