= Mrs Winter =

Australian bushranger

Mrs Winter, a bushranger in nineteenth-century Australia, was briefly associated with John Tennant, the 'Terror of Argyle'; she is believed to have been the convict Mary Winter (née Herd).

Winter is one of the several women bushrangers known from nineteenth-century Australia. Others include Aboriginal women Mary Cockerill ('Black Mary') and Mary Ann Bugg ('Mrs Thunderbolt') and Jessie Hickman.

== Biography ==
All that is known about Winter comes from an article in the Monitor of 15 October 1827. In it, she is described as a bushranger and the lover ('doxy') of John Tennant. Her first name is not given and she is called 'Mrs Winter'.

The Monitor reports two incidents from a period in Tennant's career when he appears to have spent time away from his gang. Tennant had been shot in July 1827 by James Farrell at an outstation on the Yass River. He was probably still recuperating from his wounds with Winter, at a camp somewhere near where Gundaroo is now located. During this period, Tennant's gang (including 'Dublin Jack' Rix, James Murphy and Thomas Cain) committed a robbery near Goulburn without him.

The first episode reported in the Monitor is related to Tennant shooting an Aboriginal man in the groin. His victim managed to escape and sought justice from the colonial authorities. The new governor, Ralph Darling, had recently made a point of quashing the violence of the stockmen against Aboriginal people on the frontiers in late 1826 and the police were actively investigating all allegations, although few enquiries led to convictions. Constable John Jones was dispatched to bring Tennant to justice. Jones engaged two unnamed Aboriginal trackers, who led Tennant to his camp, where Jones, in advance of his party, surprised Tennant and Winter as they were fishing on the Yass River. Tennant threatened Jones, who seemed to have lost his nerve and allowed the fugitives to escape. Jones had only one eye and Tennant used this vulnerability to intimidate him, saying 'if you don't lay down your musket, and go about your business, I'll instantly put out your remaining peeper.'

The second known incident involving Mrs Winter is a robbery at a mill at an unknown location. It could have been one of either two of the outermost commercial mills at Minto or Windsor, or a small operation set up in an outbuilding at one of the larger pastoral stations in County Argyle. Winter, armed with a 'very clean brace of pistols', entered a hut of seven workers and bailed them up while Tennant milled some flour.

=== The matching of Mrs Winter with Mary Herd ===
Mary Herd (occasionally spelt Hird or Heard) appears in the convict musters and transportation records of 1820, arriving on the Morley. She had been tried at the Old Bailey on a charge of possessing forged bank notes with 25 others. Herd was transported to Australia and sentenced to 14 years. Her court records say that she sometimes used the alias Davis and that this was her first conviction. Her age in 1820 was reported as 34 years.

On arrival in Sydney in August 1820, Herd was indentured to emancipist, Robert Winter (sometimes spelt Winters). He was working a small lease-holding on the Nepean River. They were soon married. In November 1826 the Winters and two others were arrested for the theft of bags of flour from the nearby Cranebrook homestead of entrepreneur, Samuel Terry. Robert Winter was sentenced to hang, but Mary was released on the grounds of 'insufficient evidence'. As the Winters had been living on the bank of the Nepean, opposite Emu Plains, where Tennant was working in an iron gang, it is likely that they knew him. Tennant had absconded the month before their trial. It is believed that, after her release, Mary Winter 'bolted' and joined Tennant's gang, sometime before Tennant was shot by Farrell in July 1827. In 1827 she would have been aged about 41 years.

Nothing more is known about Mary Winter and her identification as the Mrs Winter of Tennant's gang. She may have died, changed her identity, or found a quiet life on the frontier, undetected in the colonial records.
