= 2006–07 Australian Capital Territory budget =

The 2006–07 Australian Capital Territory budget for the financial year 2006–2007 was presented to the Australian Capital Territory Legislative Assembly by Chief Minister of the Australian Capital Territory Jon Stanhope on 6 June 2006. Stanhope is also the Treasurer, with this budget being the first he has presented as Treasurer. Among the most-discussed elements of the budget were its planned closure of 39 schools in the Territory as part of its "Towards 2020: Renewing Our Schools" vision for education in the Territory.

Stanhope asserted in a Letter to the People of the ACT, that this is the "first time in 17 years that any ACT Government has embarked on strategic and structural reform of this magnitude." He asserts that demographic shifts have led to 18,000 empty desks in ACT government schools and that it costs up to $10,000 more per year to educate children in schools with low enrolments, compared with a child at a school which is at or near capacity. Quoting figures from the Commonwealth Grants Commission, Stanhope argues that "it costs some 20% more, across the board, to deliver basic services like health and education in the ACT than the national average.". The budget announcements have provoked strong criticism from the ACT Council of Parents and Citizens Associations, Australian Education Union ACT branch, the ACT Opposition and members of the public.

== Revenue, expenditure and net operating balance ==
=== Revenue ===
- Taxes, Fees and Fines: $950.5 million. Main areas are:
  - Duties: $228.8m
  - Payroll tax: $220m
  - General rates:$157m
  - Land tax: $63.8m
  - Gambling: $46.6m
  - Vehicle registration: $65.7m
  - Regulatory fees: $45.6m
  - Water abstraction charge: $27.2m
  - Traffic fines: $17.6m
  - Parking fines: $9.2m
- Commonwealth Grants: $1,203.6 million
  - an increase of $65.6 million from the 2005–06 estimated outcome, mainly due to increases in Goods and Services Tax grants and Specific Purposes Payments, offset by the loss of National Competition Payments.
- User Charges: $246.7 million
  - revenues generated from the sale of goods and services to customers
- Other Revenue: $469.5 million
  - includes dividends from Territory owned Corporations, revenue from joint ventures, land sales, interest and investment returns. "This revenue will decrease by $207.5 million from the 2005–06 estimated outcome. Reductions are expected across most other revenue components."

Changes affecting revenue are designed to expand the revenue base, achieve parity with other jurisdictions where appropriate, and recover costs incurred in delivering services.

=== Expenditure ===
Total expenses in 2006/07 are planned to be $2,886.7m. Major areas of government expenditure are:

Portfolio	2006/07 planned expenditure
Health and Community Care	$756.1m
Government Schooling (including Early Childhood and Preschool Education)	$452.3m
Territory and Municipal Services (excluding Tourism, Environment, Sustainability, Heritage and Forestry Services)	$368.8m
Disability and Community Services	$207.8m
Non Government Schooling	$155.4m
Vocational Education and Training	$111.5m
Justice and Community Safety	$110.4m
Housing ACT	$104.7m
Policing	$99.5m
Treasury (including administration of the GST and FHOG)	$94.0m
Public Transport	$85.8m
Emergency Services	$77.2m
Planning	$60.3m
Environment, Sustainability, Heritage and Forestry Services	$41.8m
Chief Minister's Department	$28.6m
Business and Economic Development	$17.7m
Tourism	$16.1m
Legislative Assembly	$10.8m
Executive	$5.2m
Auditor-General	$4.6m

$337 million will be spent on Capital Works Projects in 2006–07: $112.3 million for New Works announced in the 2006/07 budget and $224.7 million for Works-in-Progress, i.e. previously announced measures.

=== Net operating balance ===
The budget for 2006/07 includes a projected operating balance in $million per year over the next four years as:

2006/07	2007/08	2008/09	2009/10
$80.3m deficit	$40.7m deficit	$18.3m surplus	$67.7m surplus

== Education ==
In 2006/07 the Government will spend $719.2 million on education:

- Government school education = $430.9m
  - 35,141 students in government schools
- Non-government schools = $155.4m
  - grants to support 24,679 students in 44 non-government schools;
- Vocational education and training = $111.5m
- Early intervention = $21.4m

The Government proposes to make capital improvements in schools ($90m) and to spend more on school maintenance. New schools will be built in Belconnen and Gungahlin ($66m) and there will be a feasibility study for a combined college and CIT campus at Gungahlin. A further $20 million has been provided over four years for Information Technology services across the school system.

The Government also proposes to close significant numbers of schools over the next three years.

- Schools to close at the end of 2006:
  - Preschools: Chifley, Flynn, Giralang, Hackett, Hall, Macarthur, McKellar, Mount Neighbour, Reid, Rivett, South Curtin, Tharwa, The Causeway, Weston Creek
  - Primary schools: Flynn, Giralang, Hall, Melrose, Mount Neighbour, Rivett, Tharwa, Weston Creek
- Schools to close at the end of 2007:
  - Preschools: Cook, Gilmore, Page, Village Creek
  - Primary schools: Cook, Gilmore, Village Creek
  - High school: Kambah
- Schools to close at the end of 2008:
  - Preschools: Higgins, Holt, Isabella Plains, Melba
  - Primary schools: Higgins, Holt, Isabella Plains, Mount Rogers
  - College: Dickson was originally to close, however has had a reprieve and now is not closing at this time.

== Health ==
In 2006/07 the Government will spend $765.1 million on health:

- Acute services = $494.8m
  - including hospital treatment for 76,520 inpatients and 273,350 outpatients;
- Community health services= $99.8m
- Mental health = $50.9m
  - including 200,320 mental health non-admitted occasions of service;
- Early intervention & prevention = $33.7m
  - including 92% of one-year-olds will be immunised according to the primary schedule, and
  - including breast cancer screening for 12,000 women
- Aged care and rehabilitation services = $32m
- Public health services = $23.7m
- Cancer services = $21m

There will be $41 million more spent on health, but the Government plans to slow the rate of growth in this budget from 10 per cent a year to around 6 per cent.

An extra $10 million will be spent to reduce elective surgery waiting lists over four years.

Canberra Hospital will become the major tertiary referral hospital, while Calvary Public Hospital will provide more specialised services.

== Public housing ==
Criteria for allocation of Public housing has been made more stringent. Single people earning more than 60% of the average wage and couples earning more than 75% of the average wage will not be eligible.

500 dwellings will be sold and the money reinvested in other public housing.

== Police & emergency services ==
The ACT police force will be increased by 60 more police.

Surveillance in the territory will increase with a network of Closed-circuit television (CCTV) cameras in public places and on ACTION buses.

The ACT Emergency Services Authority (ESA) will be re-absorbed into the ACT Department of Justice & Community Safety. A new emergency services headquarters at Fairbairn will be built at a cost of $17.3 million.

== Public service ==
New recruits will have employer superannuation contributions curbed at 9 per cent; compared with 15.4% for existing employees and 29% contributions towards the Chief Minister's superannuation.

The ACT public service will be cut by 500 jobs. A new department will absorb several agencies including Environment ACT and sport and recreation.

== Increases in taxes and charges ==
Despite the cuts in services and school closures, the average ACT household will pay around $400 more each year: rates will rise by 6 per cent and households will be charged a new fire and emergency services levy of $84.

Household water bills will increase in the order of $100 per year. There will be a new water fee of 30 cents per kilolitre. This fee will be added to water abstraction charges nearly doubling them to 55 cents per kilolitre.

== Accounting changes ==
The Government has changed its accounting system so the Budget does not include fluctuating amounts like superannuation returns.

== See also ==
- Australian Capital Territory
- Education in the Australian Capital Territory
