= Mount Tennent =

Mountain in Australian Capital Territory

- Aboriginal: Tharwa
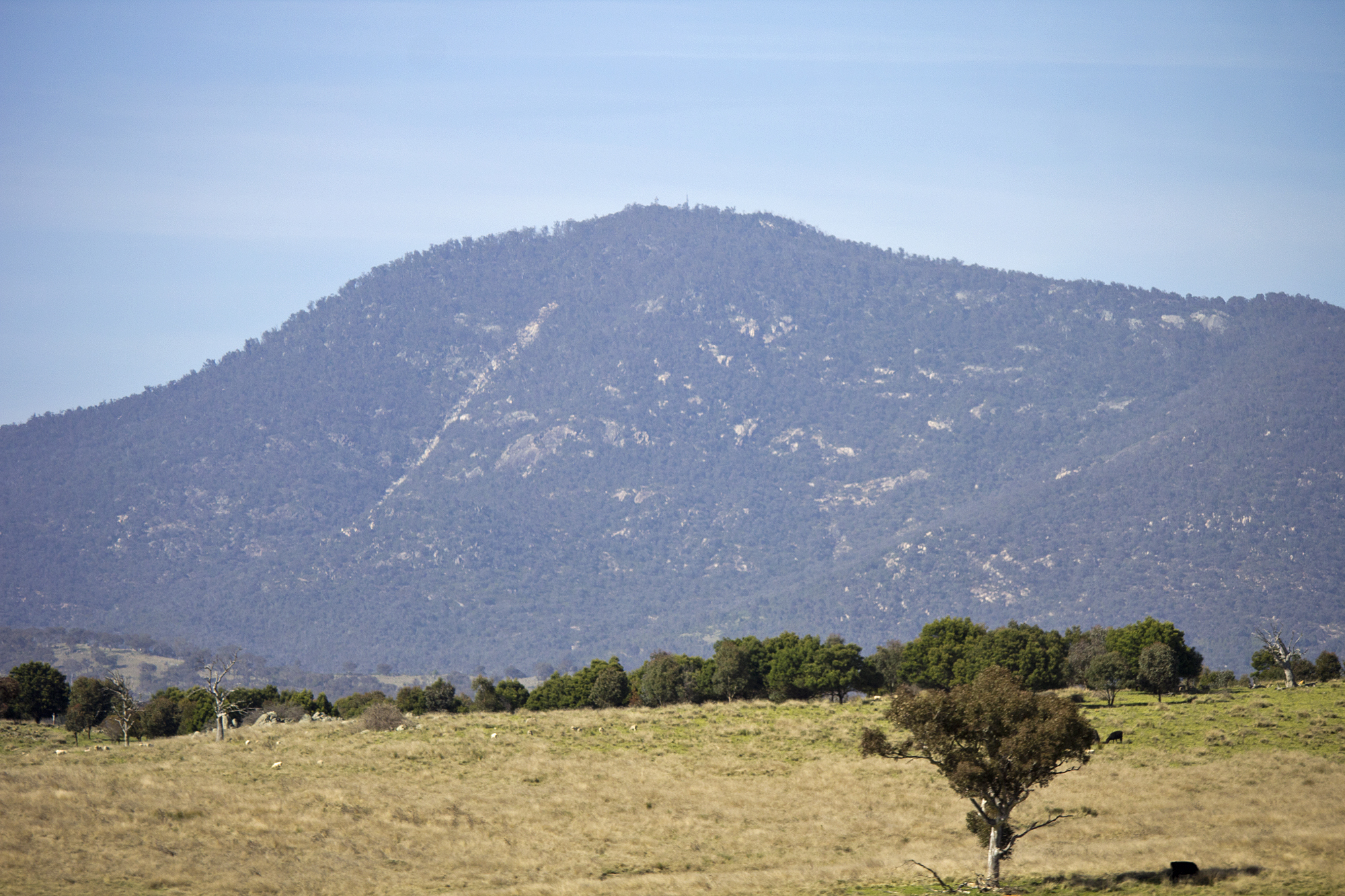
- Mount Tennent, viewed from Point Hut Road.

Highest point
- Elevation: 1,375 m (4,511 ft)
- Coordinates: 35°33′S 149°03′E

Geography
- Location within Australian Capital Territory
- Location: Australian Capital Territory, Australia

Mount Tennent (Aboriginal: Tharwa) is a mountain with an elevation of 1,375 metres (4,511 ft) AHD in the southern part of the Australian Capital Territory in Australia. The Gudgenby River flows at the base of the mountain.

== Location and features ==
Mount Tennent is named after a local bushranger, John Tennant^{1} who had a hideout on the slopes of the mountain in 1827. It had previously been named Mount Currie by Allan Cunningham after Captain Mark Currie, who led the first European expedition nearby (Fraser and McJannett) in 1823. Indigenous Australians refer to the mountain as Tharwa, also the name of the village at the northern foot of the mountain.

In 2004, ACTEW announced that the creation of a large 159 gigalitres (5.6×10^{9} cu ft) reservoir by damming the Gudgenby River below Mount Tennent, was one of three options being considered as part of the Future Water Options Project in order to provide improved reliability and increased supply of potable water for Canberra and the ACT. By 2005, the ACT Government decided that the creation of the Mount Tennent dam would not proceed, instead opting for the enlargement of the Cotter Dam.

== Recreation ==
Mount Tennent is home to Australia's Outward Bound HQ. Throughout the year Mt Tennent is used by Outward Bound as camping grounds for their courses. Outward Bound also plant many native trees in the area as an environmental initiative. Mt Tennent also has a variety of walking trails and driving trails throughout its range, including the final section of the Australian Alps Walking Track. Many people travel from the base of the mountain to the summit every day as a part of exercise and recreational habit.

== Note ==
^1 There is a spelling difference between the naming of the mountain and the bushranger's name.
