= Henry Hall (farmer) =

Henry Hall (1802–1880) was an Australian farmer. The Village of Hall, in the Australian Capital Territory was named after him.

He was born in England in 1802 and emigrated to Australia in 1823 and worked for the Australian Agricultural Company until 1833 when he was granted 1413 hectares at Charnwood where he built a homestead and with his wife raised ten children. In 1873 they both moved to Yass. Mary died in 1876 and Henry in 1880.
