= Hall, Australian Capital Territory =

Hall
- Town
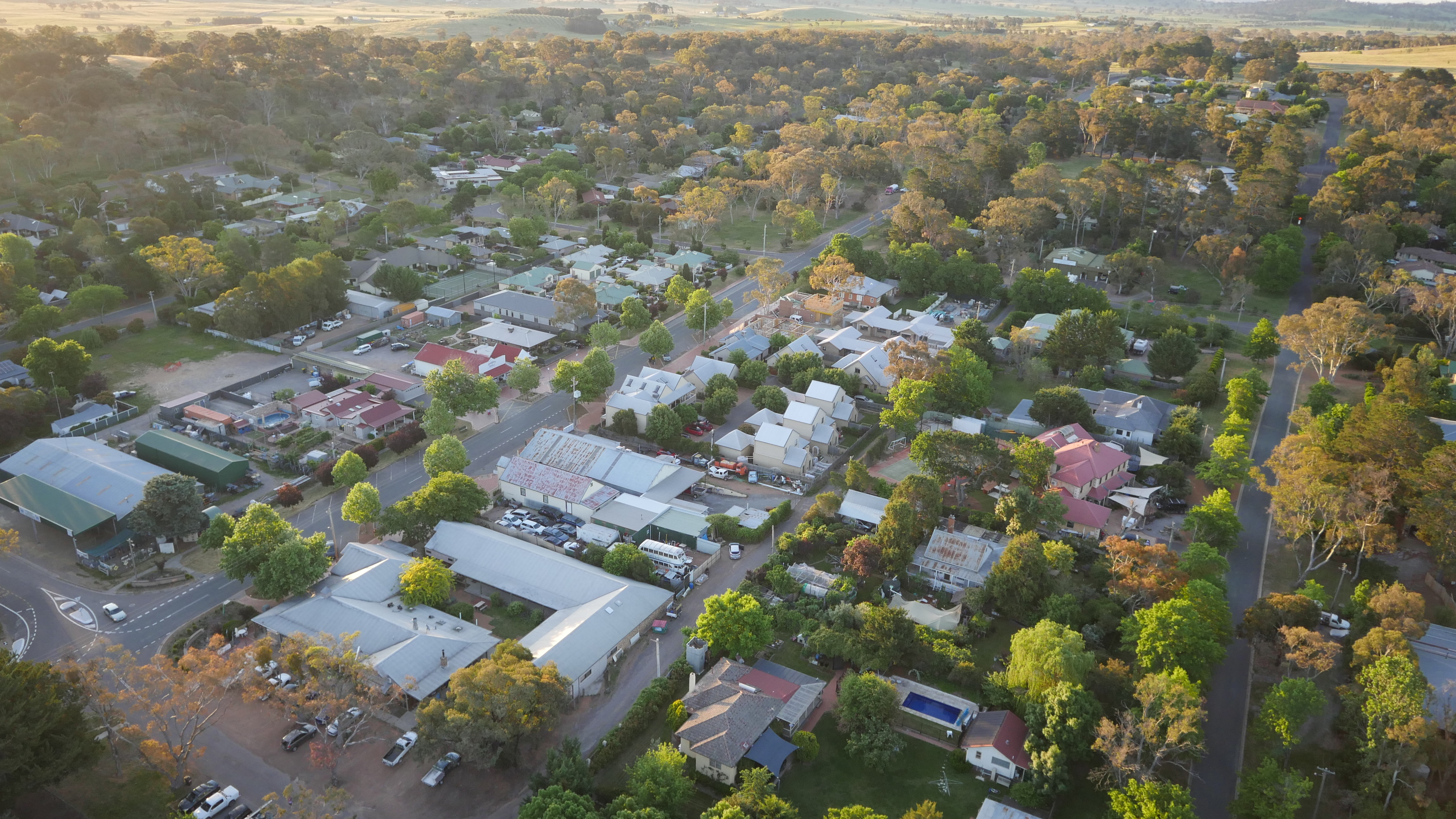
- Aerial Photo of Hall

- Coordinates: 35°10′09″S 149°04′09″E
- Country: Australia
- State: Australian Capital Territory
- District: Hall
- Location: 15 km (9.3 mi) NW of Canberra CBD; 30 km (19 mi) NW of Queanbeyan; 94 km (58 mi) SW of Goulburn; 291 km (181 mi) SW of Sydney
- Established: 1882

Government
  - Territory electorate: Yerrabi
  - Federal division: Fenner
- Elevation: 633 m (2,077 ft)

Population
  - Total: 298 (2021 census)
- Postcode: 2618
Localities around Hall
Wallaroo (New South Wales)	Springrange (New South Wales)
	Hall
	Kinlyside

Hall is a town in the district of Hall, in the Australian Capital Territory in Australia. It is situated on the north side of the Australian Capital Territory. At the 2021 census, the village had a population of 298 people. It is surrounded by open country and has a rural appearance. Hall has retained a village character. The town features historic buildings that existed before the establishment of Canberra.

== History ==
The area that is now known as Hall lies on the traditional lands of the Ngunnawal people.

In 1826, George Palmer established his Palmerville estate in Ginninginderry, with a homestead located on the banks of Ginninderra Creek, adjacent to the present-day suburb of Giralang. The estate encompassed much of what is now Belconnen and southern Gungahlin. It adjoined the Charnwood estate to the west and Yarralumla estate to the east. The combined area of the Ginninderra and Charnwood properties was nearly 20,150 acres (8,150 ha).

By 1861, a store, post office, cottages and homestead had been set up on a property owned by William Davis at Ginninderra, about 3 km south of Hall. This settlement was known by residents as Ginninderra village. In 1881, the New South Wales Government surveyed the area for an official village and chose a site on Halls Creek.

The new village, called Ginninderra, was officially proclaimed in 1882, but following protests from local residents, was renamed Hall, in honour of Henry Hall, the first landholder in the area. The village was planned on a rectangular grid, and the first sale of land occurred in 1886.

In 1911, the Australian Capital Territory was gazetted and Hall lay within the boundary of the land allocated, near the new border with New South Wales. Hall had been one of the sites considered for a capital city, within the 'Yass-Canberra' district. However, following a survey of the various sites, by Charles Scrivener, in 1909, Canberra was selected as the site for the new national capital city.

Hall did not grow because, compared with the growing city of Canberra, it had few amenities. For example, it was not provided with town water until 1967. In 1954, the main street of Hall (which had been part of the state highway system since 1935) was named the Barton Highway.

In 1980, the highway alignment was shifted to the west as part of a dual-carriage upgrade, bypassing Hall completely, and the former section of the Barton Highway through Hall was renamed Victoria Street.

=== Churches and schools ===
St. Francis Xavier's Catholic Church is located on 220 Victoria Street, Hall. It is one of the oldest churches in the Canberra region and was built in 1910 with the help of the Catholic Community of Hall. There is also an Anglican church, St Michael and All Angels. Between 1911 and 2006, Hall had a school, from 1911 to 2006; part of it is now a school museum (which opened in 2005), and part is used as a pre-school.

== Features and attractions ==
Some features of note within Hall village are:

- Hall Pavilion and Showground. The showground area plays host to the Hall Markets, a popular monthly charity market showcasing hand-produced goods.
- Equestrian park and polocrosse grounds
- The National Sheep Dog Trial Championship, held each year at the showground
- The Hall Bushrangers Rugby Football Club, est. 1991
- Hall Premier Store and Post Office
- Hall ACT Rural Fire Service brigade
- Numerous historic buildings and cottages, including Cooee (1900), Glenowa (1900), Winarlia (1901) and Ottocliffe (1907).
- St. Francis Xavier's Catholic Church
- St. Michael & All Angels' Anglican Church
- Memorial Avenue of trees
- Hall School Museum and Heritage Centre, located in the former Hall Primary School
- The Rotary Club of Hall, a rural-focused Rotary Club that runs the Capital Region Farmers Market as a community service project, with the aim of helping to increase agri-business opportunities in the region.

== Geology ==
In the Hall area, the rocks volcanic, and date from the Silurian age. Green-grey and purple quartz andesite and dacite from the Hawkins Volcanics lie under the village and extend up the Halls Creek valley. Green-grey dacite and quartz andesite from the Hawkins Volcanics cover the surrounding areas, up to the New South Wales border, north to One Tree Hill, south-east to the Harcourt Hill and south to the north edge of Belconnen. Dark grey to green grey dacitic tuff is found over the New South Wales border, and also within the Australian Capital Territory near Gooromon Ponds Creek.

== See also ==
- Canberra District wine region
- Suburbs of Canberra
