= Lands administrative divisions of Australia =

Cadastral divisions of Australia for land identification

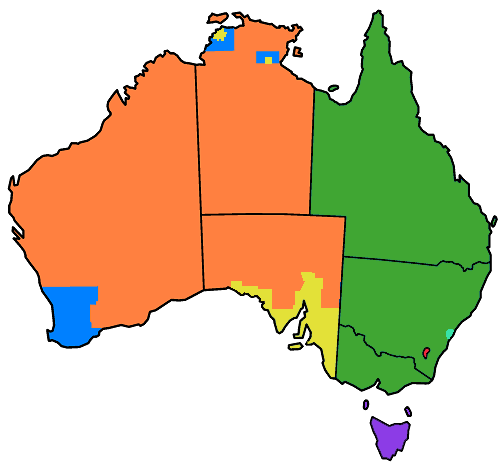
No counties, parishes or hundreds. Former counties, no further divisions. Counties, divided into hundreds. Counties, divided into parishes. Districts, partially divided into suburbs. (Australian Capital Territory only) Land districts (formerly counties), divided into parishes, and formerly with hundreds. Counties, divided into parishes, and formerly with hundreds also. (Cumberland County, New South Wales only)

Lands administrative divisions of Australia are the cadastral divisions of Australia for the purposes of identification of land to ensure security of land ownership. Most states term these divisions as counties, parishes, hundreds, and other terms. The eastern states of Queensland, New South Wales, Victoria, and Tasmania were divided into counties and parishes in the 19th century, although the Tasmanian counties were renamed land districts in the 20th century. Parts of South Australia (south-east) and Western Australia (south-west) were similarly divided into counties, and there were also five counties in a small part of the Northern Territory. However South Australia has subdivisions of hundreds instead of parishes, along with the Northern Territory, which was part of South Australia when the hundreds were proclaimed. There were also formerly hundreds in Tasmania. There have been at least 600 counties, 544 hundreds and at least 15,692 parishes in Australia, but there are none of these units for most of the sparsely inhabited central and western parts of the country.

Counties in Australia have little administrative and no political function, unlike those in England or the United States. Australia instead uses local government areas, including shires, districts, city councils, and municipalities according to the state, as the second-level subdivision.

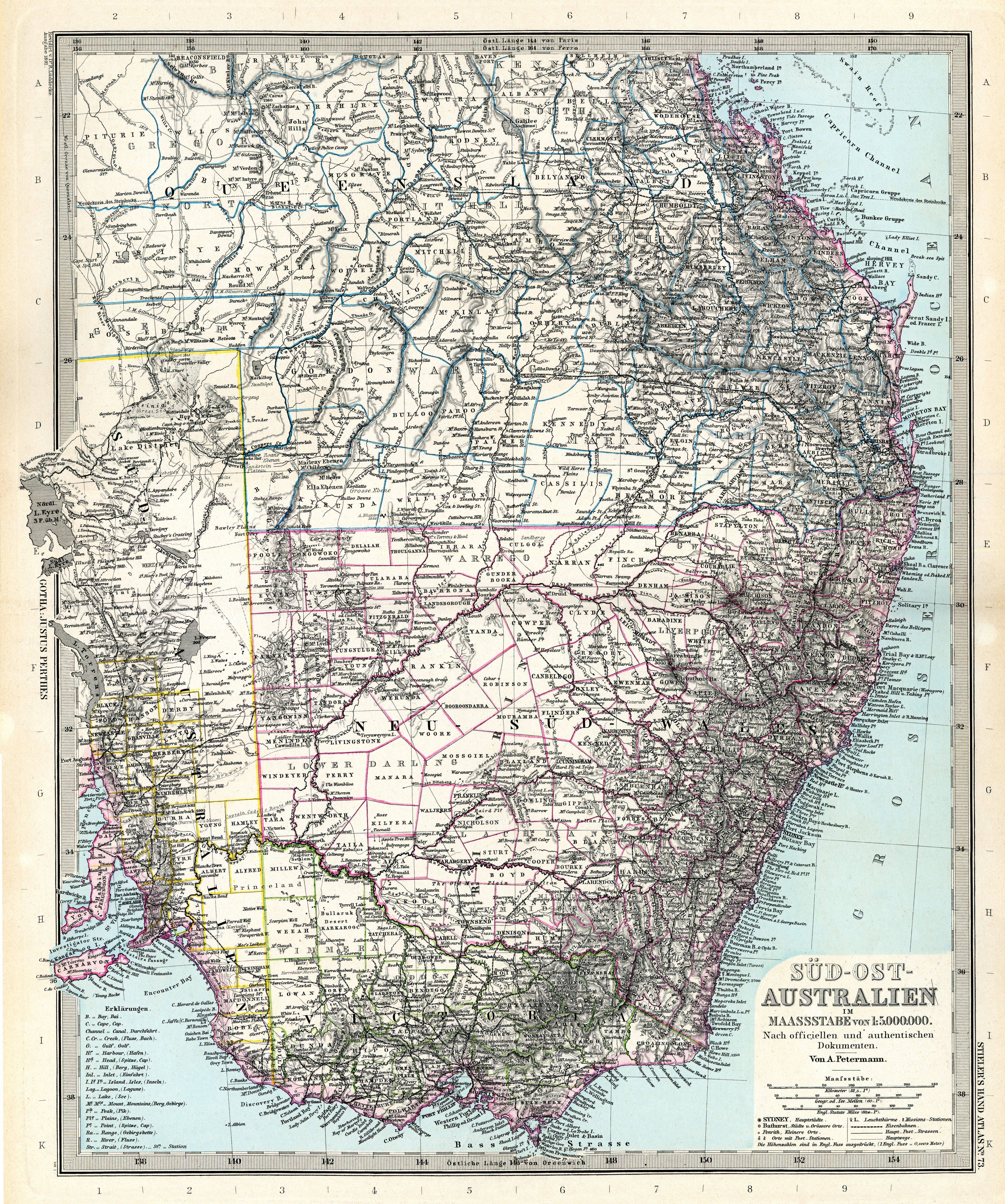
1891 German map of south-eastern Australia showing many of the divisions.

Some other states were also divided into land divisions and land districts; in the nineteenth century, land districts sometimes served as the region name for parts of the state where counties had not been proclaimed yet. Below these are groups of land parcels known as deposited plans, registered plans or title plans (depending on the state). Queensland has registered plans; New South Wales and Western Australia have deposited plans; while Victoria has certified plans. Land can be identified using the number of this plan of subdivision held with the lands department, rather than with a named unit such as a parish (or both can be used); it has become more common to use only the plan number. Within these are individual land parcels such as lots; in total there are estimated to be about 10.2 million of these in Australia. The various cadastral units appear on certificates of title, which are given volume and folio numbers; these numbers by themselves are sometimes used to identify land parcels, or in combination with the other units. Detailed maps of these divisions have been required since the introduction of the Torrens title system of a central register of land holdings in South Australia in 1858, which spread to the other colonies. While cadastral data since the 1980s has been digitalised, there remain many old maps showing these divisions held in collections of Australian libraries such as the National Library of Australia, as well as in state libraries.

== History ==
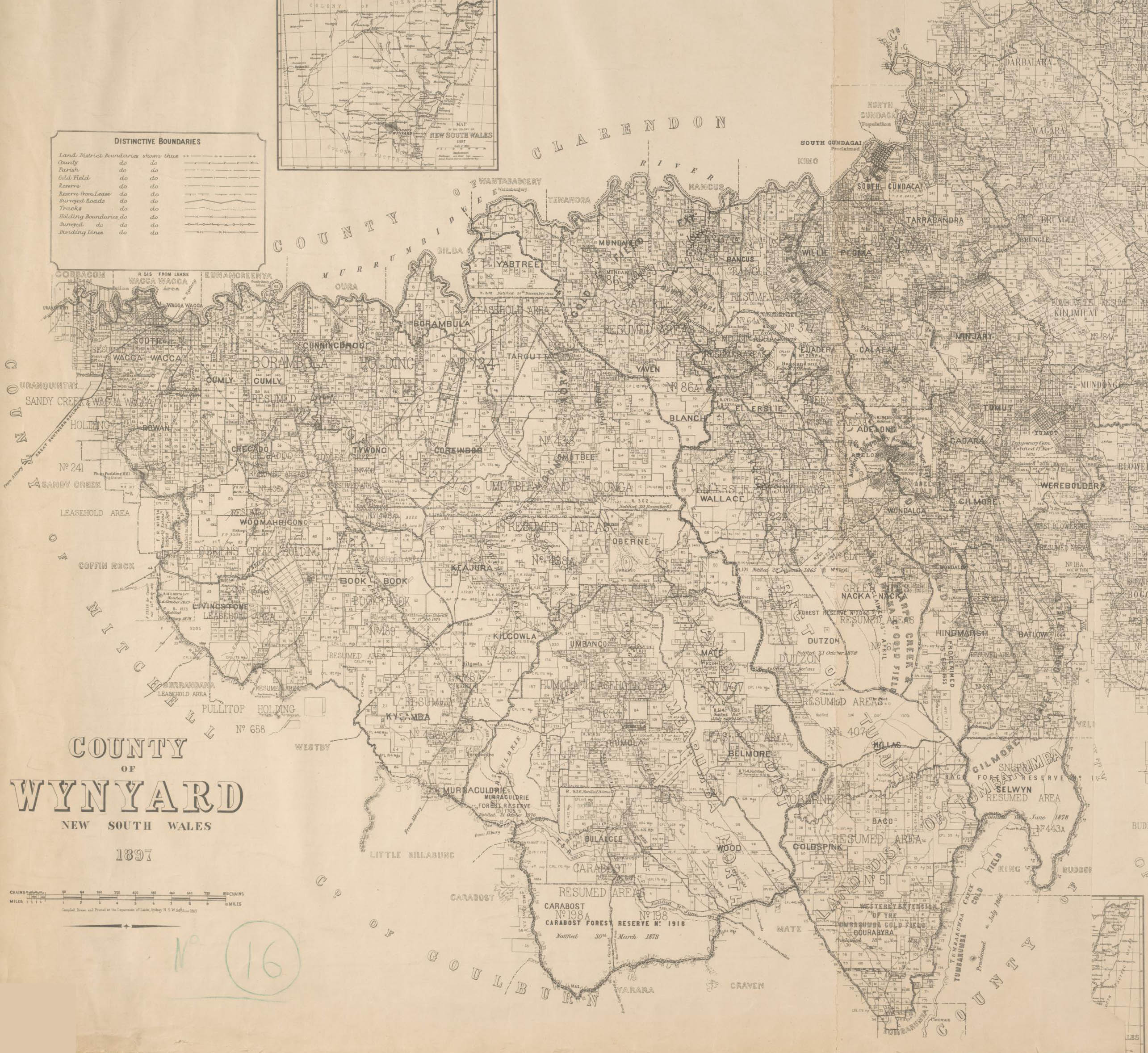
1897 cadastral map of the County of Wynyard, New South Wales, showing parishes and property boundaries.

Counties were used since the earliest British settlement in Australia, with the County of Cumberland proclaimed by Captain Phillip on 4 June 1788. In 1804 Governor King divided Van Diemen's Land into two counties; Buckingham in the south and Cornwall in the north. The parishes date to the surveys conducted after 1825, with the instructions given to Governor Brisbane on 23 Jun 1825 to divide the colony into counties, hundreds and parishes. At this time there were five counties already proclaimed in New South Wales: Cumberland, Westmoreland, Camden, Argyle and Northumberland. The Nineteen Counties in south-eastern New South Wales were the limits of location of the colony in a period after 1829, with the area outside them originally divided into districts, and later also into counties and parishes. Counties were established soon after the foundation of other Australian colonies.

Many of the counties have English names, often the names of counties in England, such as Devon, Dorset, Cornwall and Kent Counties in Tasmania. Less frequently, some have Aboriginal names such as the County of Yungnulgra in New South Wales, and County of Croajingolong in Victoria.

The use of counties, hundreds and parishes was popular in Australia in the 19th century, with many maps of Australian colonies showing these divisions, and towns and cities often listed in their county. Legal cases referenced counties, and many genealogical records for Australia in the 19th century list the county and parish for location of birth, deaths and marriages. The 1911 Britannica also describes Australian towns and cities as being in their respective county, including most of the capital cities: Melbourne, County of Bourke; Sydney, County of Cumberland; Brisbane, County of Stanley; Adelaide, County of Adelaide; and Hobart, County of Buckingham. However it is not mentioned that Perth was located in the County of Perth, as even by this time county names were infrequently used in Western Australia, where they did not cover all of the settled areas, unlike the other states. Instead the system of land divisions and land districts was used, with most of Perth located in the land districts of Swan, Canning and Cockburn Sound, all in the South West Land Division of Western Australia.

Counties and parishes are also still referenced in property law, and in industrial relations instruments, for example in a New South Wales award, which excludes people from the County of Yancowinna. Similar award examples exist in the other states and territories that have been subdivided into counties. The County of Yancowinna is also the only part of New South Wales which is in a different time zone to the rest of the state, as mentioned in the Australian Standard Time Act of 1987. Counties are also used on paperwork for mortgage securities in banks. Parishes and counties are also mentioned in definitions of electoral districts.

== Usage ==
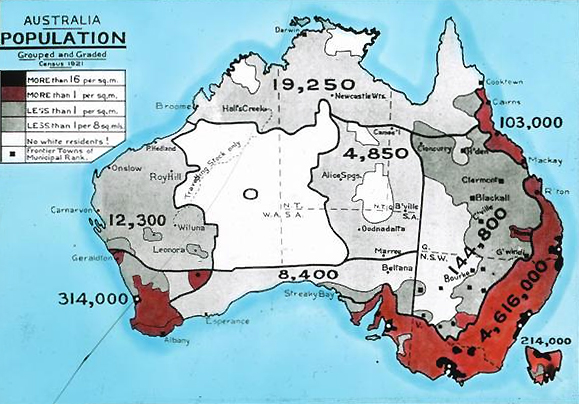
Population density map, (of white residents) 1921. Evenly divided units of land have little relevance in a country where the population is highly unevenly distributed.

Counties have since gone out of use in Australia, and are rarely used or even known by most of the population today. Part of the reason is that counties are based on the size of land, rather than population, so in a large country where most of the population live in cities on the coast while the countryside has a very low population density, they have little relevance. The counties which contain the capital cities have millions of people, while those in remote areas have a very small population. The County of Adelaide, for instance, has a larger population than all the other counties in South Australia combined. Another reason is that many of the counties' borders follow rivers, having been proclaimed before settlements developed, which means that towns which typically grow up on rivers often find themselves in more than one county. Wangaratta, for instance, is located at the junction of the Ovens and King rivers, and is thus in three counties; Moira, Delatite and Bogong.

Some of the county names live on by being the same name of present-day local government areas, general region names, towns or establishments in the area. For instance, the current Shire of Plantagenet and Shire of Victoria Plains in Western Australia are in the similar area to the County of Plantagenet and County of Victoria, respectively. The modern city of Devonport in Tasmania is located in the County of Devon. Some regions do promote the county name, such as Argyle County, while the County of Cadell (roughly in the Murray Shire area) is still the name for a vineyard and motor lodge in the same area.

== By state/territory ==
=== Australian Capital Territory ===
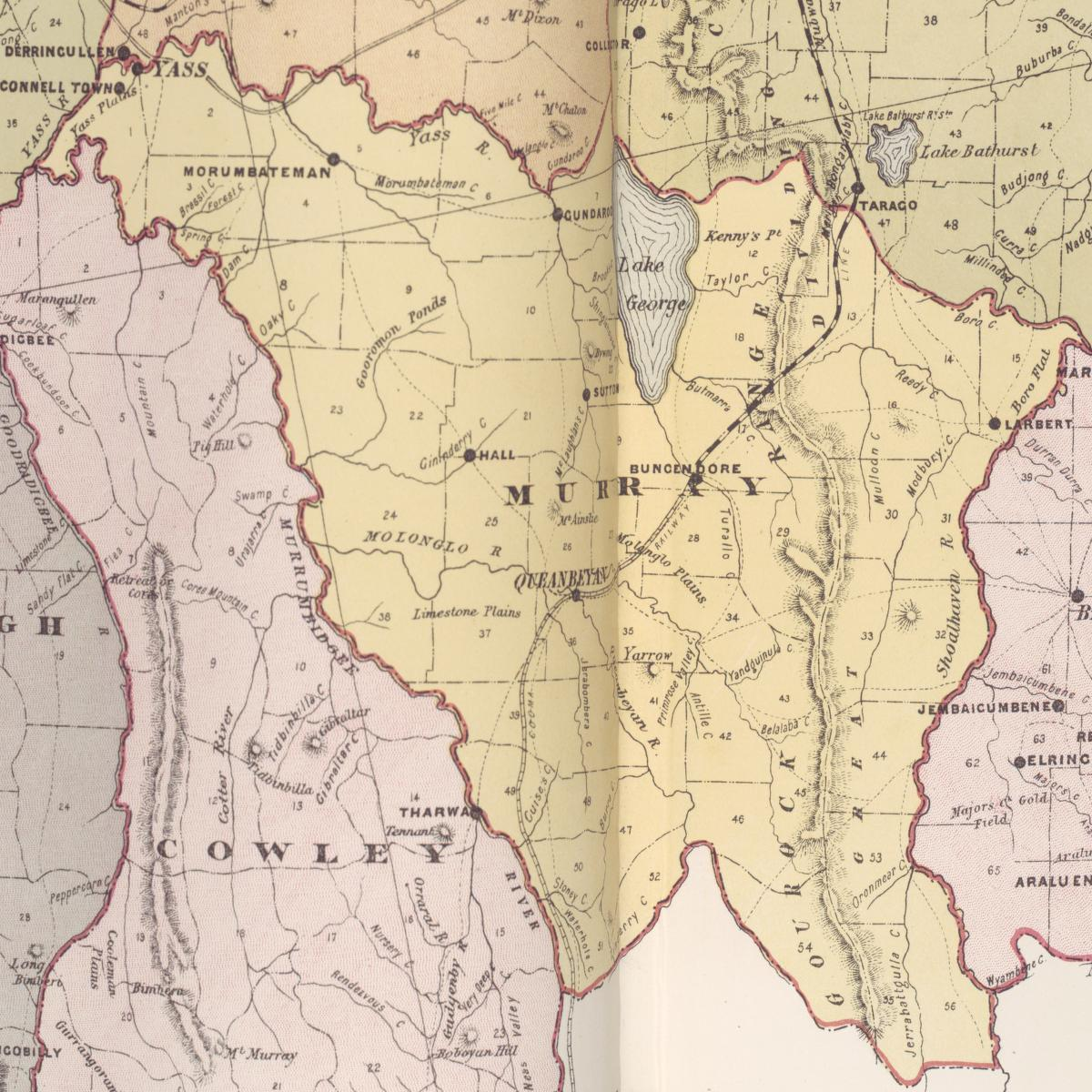
Map of Murray and Cowley counties in New South Wales in 1886, parts of which would eventually become the ACT

The land which became the Australian Capital Territory was made from land in the New South Wales counties of Murray and Cowley. This includes four former parishes of Canberra, Yarrolumla, Narrabundah and Gigerline in Murray and 15 former parishes in Cowley, while land in parts of other parishes of these counties also became part of the ACT. Murray lies east of the Murrumbidgee River, with Cowley to the west of the river. Parishes and counties are not currently used in ACT titles. Instead, the Districts Act 1966 divided the ACT into 18 districts: Canberra Central, Woden Valley, Belconnen, Jerrabomberra, Majura, Tuggeranong, Weston Creek, Gungahlin, Stromlo, Kowen, Hall, Coree, Paddys River, Cotter River, Tennent, Rendezvous Creek, Booth and Mount Clear. The parts of these located in Canberra itself are divided into divisions (i.e. suburbs), sections and blocks. For example, the National Library of Australia is located in Section 27, Blocks 4, 5 and 8, Division of Parkes, District of Canberra Central.

=== New South Wales ===
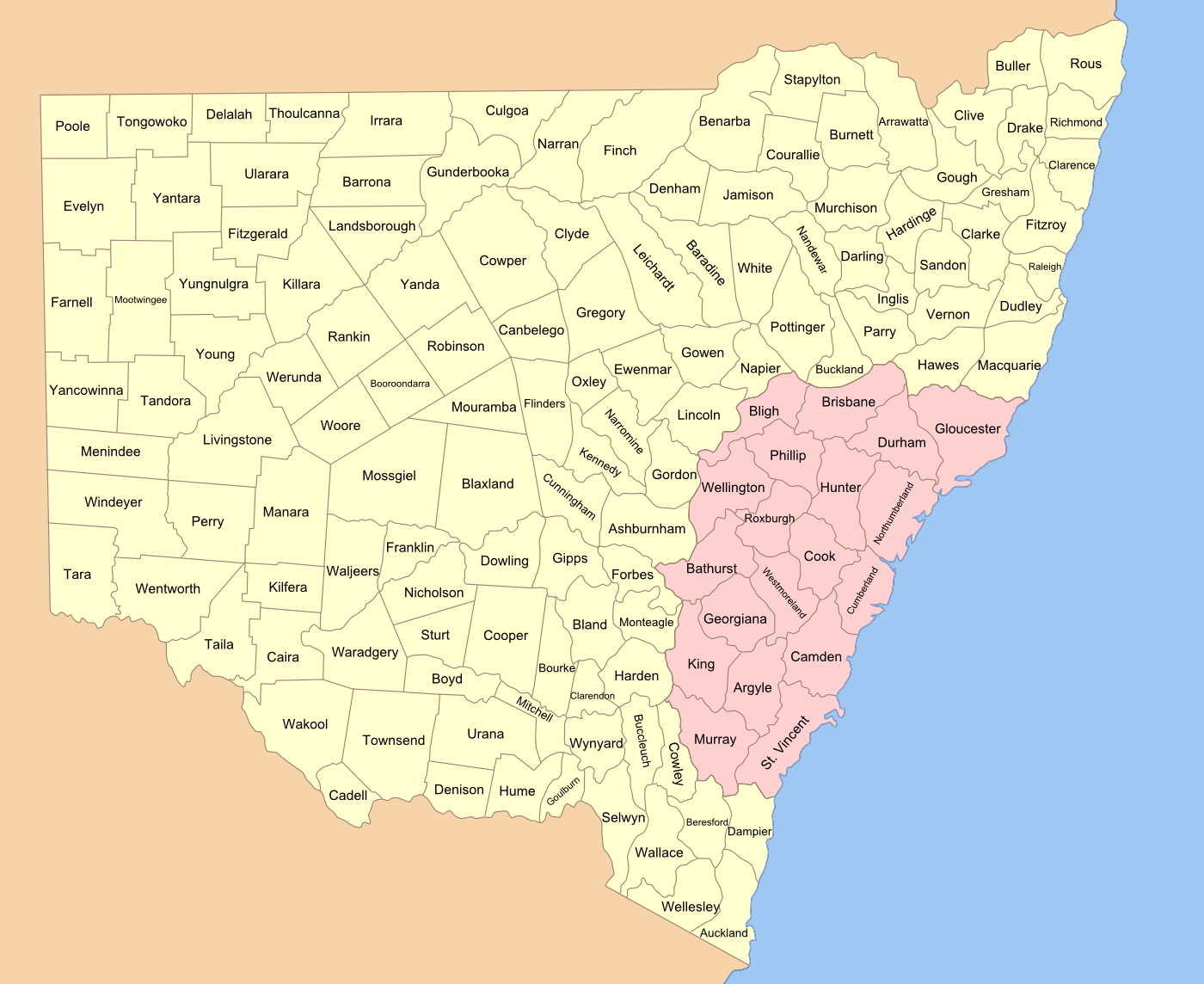
The 141 counties of New South Wales, with the original Nineteen Counties shown in pink

There are 141 counties and 7,459 parishes within New South Wales. The County of Cumberland, in which Sydney is located, has the largest population. The original Nineteen Counties were the limits of settlement in the early part of the 19th century. Legal documents describe the Lot number, Deposited Plan number, Parish and County. For example, the Sydney Opera House is described as being in Lot 5 in Deposited Plan 775888 at Bennelong Point, Parish of St. James, County of Cumberland, city of Sydney. Note that the land administration counties are not the same as the county councils that have been used to administer water and electricity, such as the Goldenfields Water County Council or Central Tablelands County Council which do not correspond with a land administration county. Note some county councils have been named after an (approximately) coterminous land administration county, but nonetheless the land administration county and the county council remained legally distinct: Cumberland (1945–63), Northumberland (1948–63) and Rous (1940-pres., with trading name of Rous Water.

=== Northern Territory ===
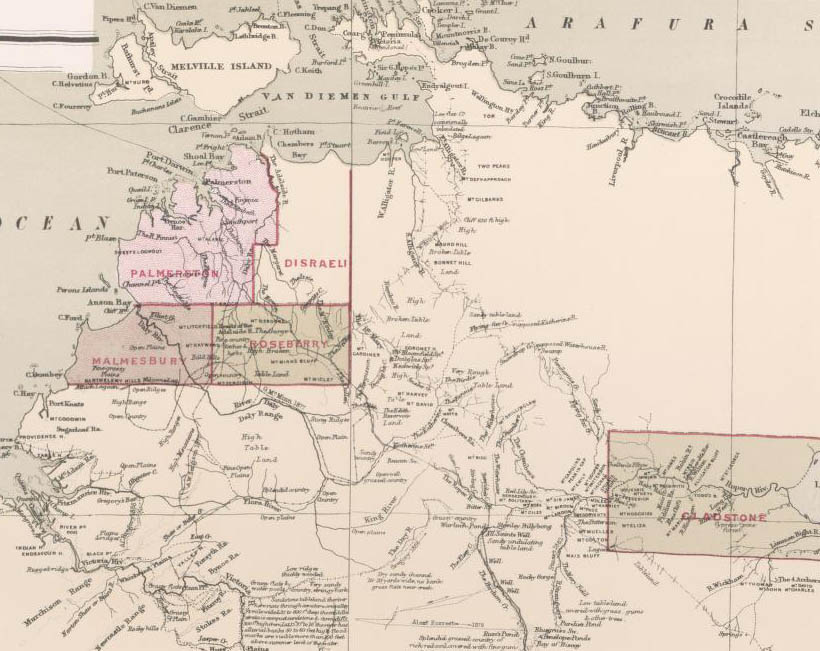
1886 map showing the small part of the Northern Territory near Darwin subdivided into five counties

There were only five counties in the Northern Territory, which were divided into hundreds.

- County of Disraeli
- Malmesbury County
- Palmerston County (containing Darwin)
- Roseberry County (containing Pine Creek)
- Gladstone County (separate from the others, in south-eastern Arnhem Land in the Roper River area)

Darwin is located in the Hundred of Bagot in the Palmerston County: usually only the hundred name, not the county, is mentioned. This is divided into sections. An example of the way locations are described for Darwin is Darwin International Airport listed as being in "Section 3381, Hundred of Bagot from plan LT089/067A" In Alice Springs, where there are no hundreds or counties, legal documents give the lot number, town and plan number, for example "Lot 8721 Town of Alice Springs, plan(s) LTO96/016"

=== Queensland ===
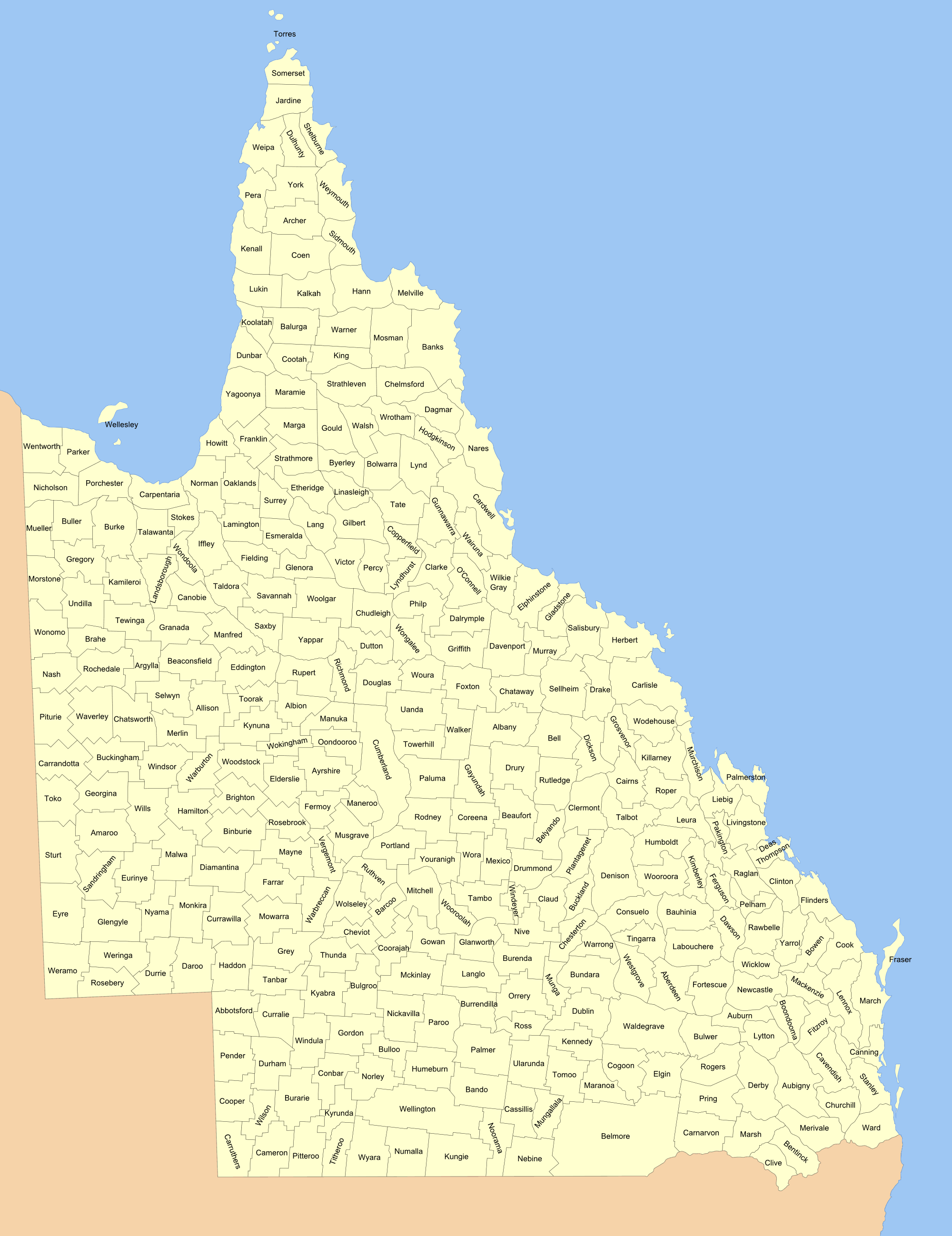
The 319 counties of Queensland in 1901.

There are currently 322 counties in Queensland, subdivided into 5,319 parishes. In the 19th century there were 109 counties, which were later divided into 319 in 1901. The counties which contain the largest population are those on the east coast with the County of Stanley containing Brisbane; the County of Ward containing the Gold Coast and the County of Canning containing Caboolture. Several of these were counties in New South Wales before Queensland became a separate colony in 1859. Legal documents used to list the Lot number, Registered Plan number, County and Parish. For instance, government land near the Brisbane Cricket Ground was described as "Lot 2 on Registered Plan B31553, County of Stanley, Parish of South Brisbane". However, since the digitisation and renumbering of the cadastre of Queensland, parishes are no longer used on title documents. While they have never officially been abolished, they are no longer used except in historical contexts. In 2006, the Queensland Department of Natural Resources, Mines and Water was considering abolishing Counties and Parishes and using only Lot and Plan numbers to identify parcels of land.

=== South Australia ===
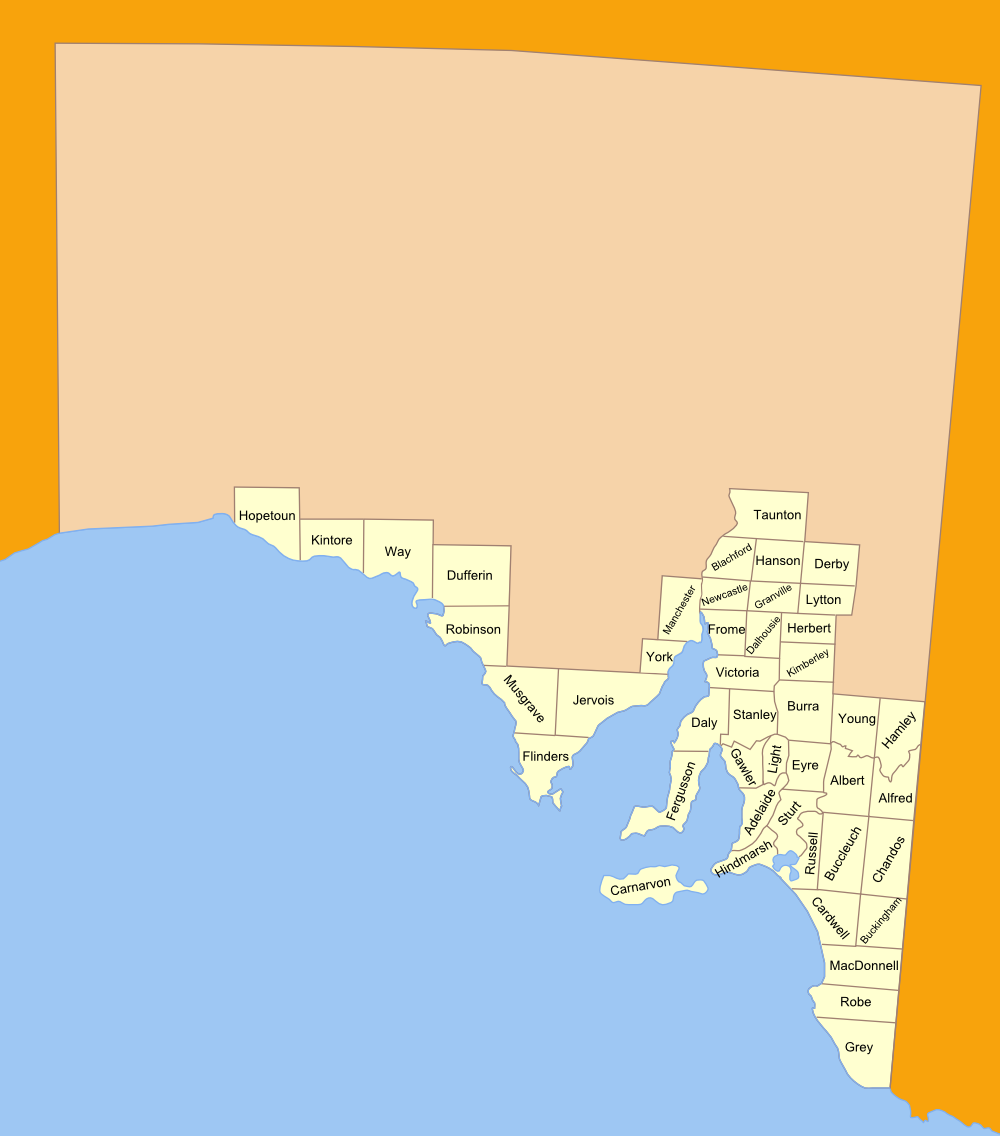
The 45 counties of South Australia in 1893; later 4 more were proclaimed

There are 49 counties in South Australia, mostly in the south-east part of the state. All except 3 of the counties are subdivided into a total of 535 Hundreds. 5 further Hundreds proclaimed between 1853 and 1860 were annulled in 1870. Additionally, 10 Hundreds with names of German origin were renamed after Allied commanders or battles in 1918, 8 of these 10 had been slated for renaming in 1916, but the Aboriginal names suggested at the time were rejected. At various times 3 other Hundred names were proposed but never adopted. All 561 (535+5+10+8+3) current, obsolete or proposed Hundred names are listed in South Australia's official online gazetteer Placenames Online. The city of Adelaide is located in the Hundred of Adelaide in the County of Adelaide. The County of Adelaide held at least 60% of South Australia's population between 1855 and 1921; the figure rose to 70.6% in 1966. All of the existing counties had been proclaimed by 1900, except for Le Hunte (proclaimed 1908), Bosanquet (proclaimed 1913), and Hore-Ruthven (proclaimed 1933). Parcels of land in most residential areas are identified with the Deposited Plan or Filed Plan number with an allotment number, for example: "Allotment 20 in Deposited Plan (DP) 11270". In many rural areas and historically in residential areas, land is described with the Section number, hundred and county, for example "Section 53, Hundred of Borda, County of Carnarvon", or the allotment number within government towns. Sometimes a combination is used, such as "allotment 1 (DP 25326), Hundred of Munno Para". Often only the hundred name is used, not the county, as each hundred has a unique name making the county name redundant.

=== Tasmania ===
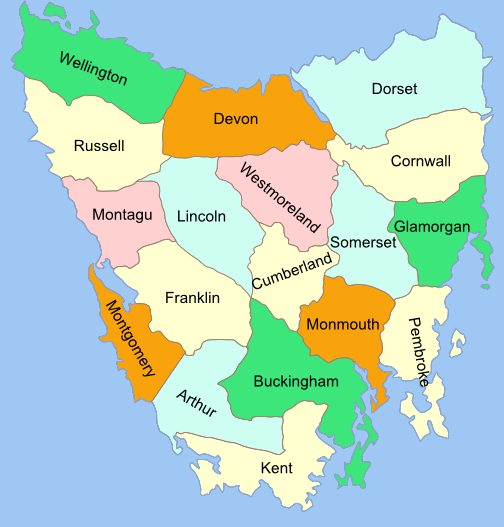
The 18 land districts (formerly counties) on the island of Tasmania

Tasmania is divided into 20 land districts, subdivided into 480 parishes. These include the former 18 counties, which were renamed land districts and retained the same borders. In addition Flinders Island and King Island are now also districts. In the nineteenth and early twentieth century Tasmania had 18 counties. The original counties were divided into hundreds (containing four parishes) but this distinction was seldom observed . Legal documents list Lot numbers, Plan numbers, Parishes and Land Districts. For example, "Lot No. 2 on Plan No. P.14486, Parish of Sorell, Land District of Pembroke"

=== Victoria ===
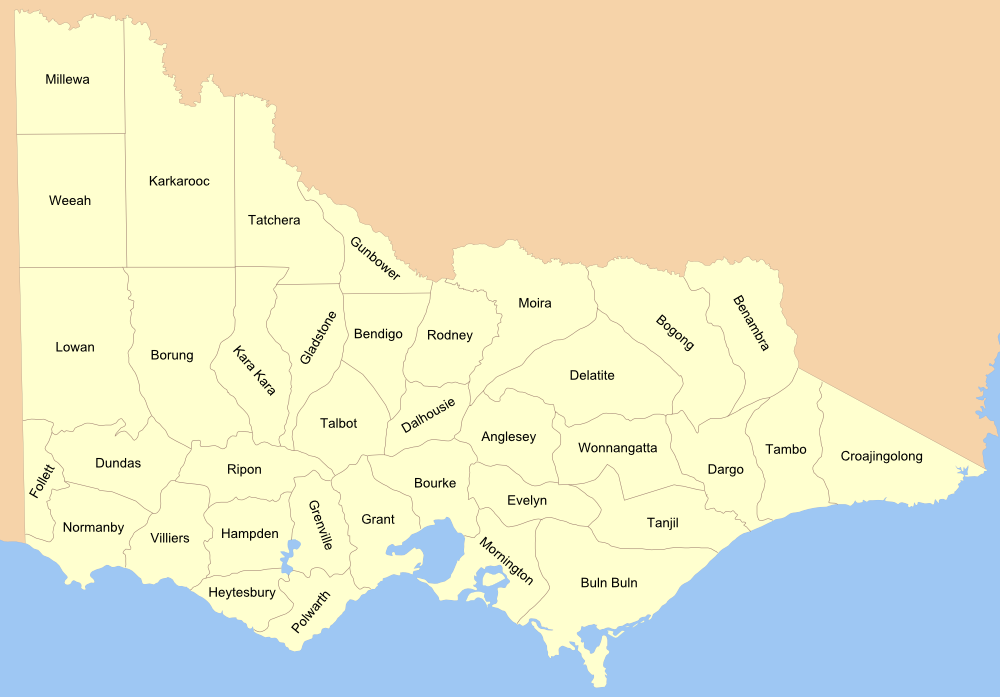
Map of the 37 Victorian counties

The cadastral divisions of Victoria are called counties and parishes. Victoria is divided into 37 counties, roughly 40 mi × 40 mi (64 km × 64 km) in size, subdivided into 2,914 parishes. Parishes were subdivided into sections of various sizes for sale as farming allotments, or designated as a town and then divided into sections and these subdivided into crown allotments. However, many parishes do not follow county borders, some being located in more than one county.

The county with the largest population is the County of Bourke, which contains Melbourne. Legal documents can describe the county, parish, township (if there is one), section, crown allotment number, and certified plan number. For example: "County of Dalhousie, Parish of Lauriston, being 2 hectares, being Crown Allotment 2, Section 40" or "Parish of Ballarat, County of Grant.. Crown Allotment 29, Section 101, Township of Ballarat East.. as shown on Certified Plan No. 105127"

=== Western Australia ===
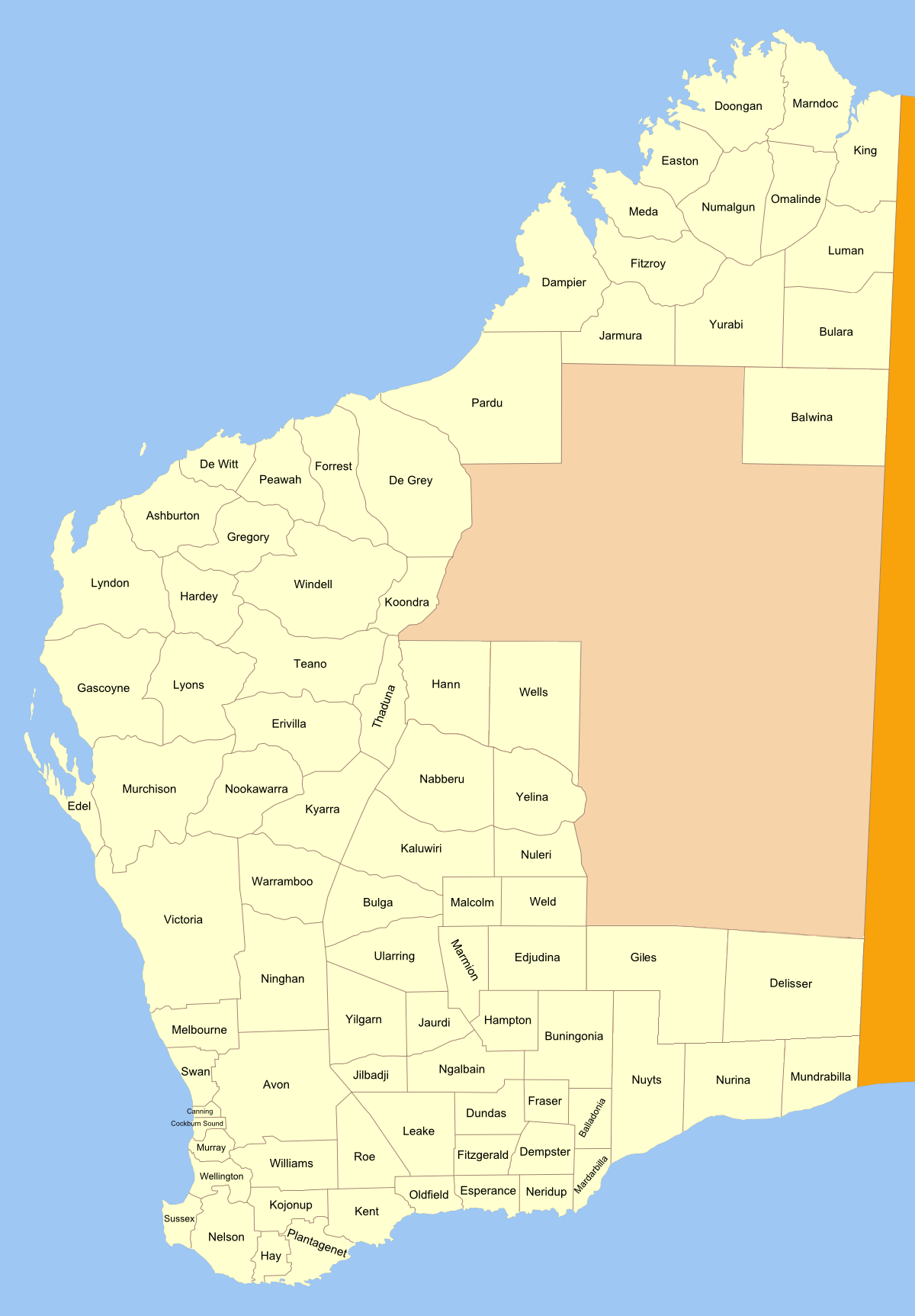
Map of the 80 land districts of Western Australia in 1909

At the start of the 20th century, Western Australia had six land divisions which cover the whole state, divided into 80 land districts. The land districts were further subdivided into locations and lots. Western Australia also had 26 counties, all located in the south-west corner of the state, around Perth. The counties were designated in 1829, the year of the foundation of the Swan River Colony, with Governor Stirling instructing that counties were to be approximately 40 miles square (1,600 square miles). The counties appear on some nineteenth century maps of Australia along with counties in other states, however it was the land districts which were used for cadastral purposes, and were the equivalent of the counties used in the eastern states. Around the end of the twentieth century, legal documents usually wrote them in the order: land district, location, number. For example: "Swan Location 2301". These are further divided into lots. More recently, Western Australia uses only the lot and deposited plan numbers, such as "Lot 853 on Deposited Plan 222626".

== See also ==
- Australian property law
- Australian property legislation
- Torrens title
