= Paddys River (district) =

District of the Australian Capital Territory

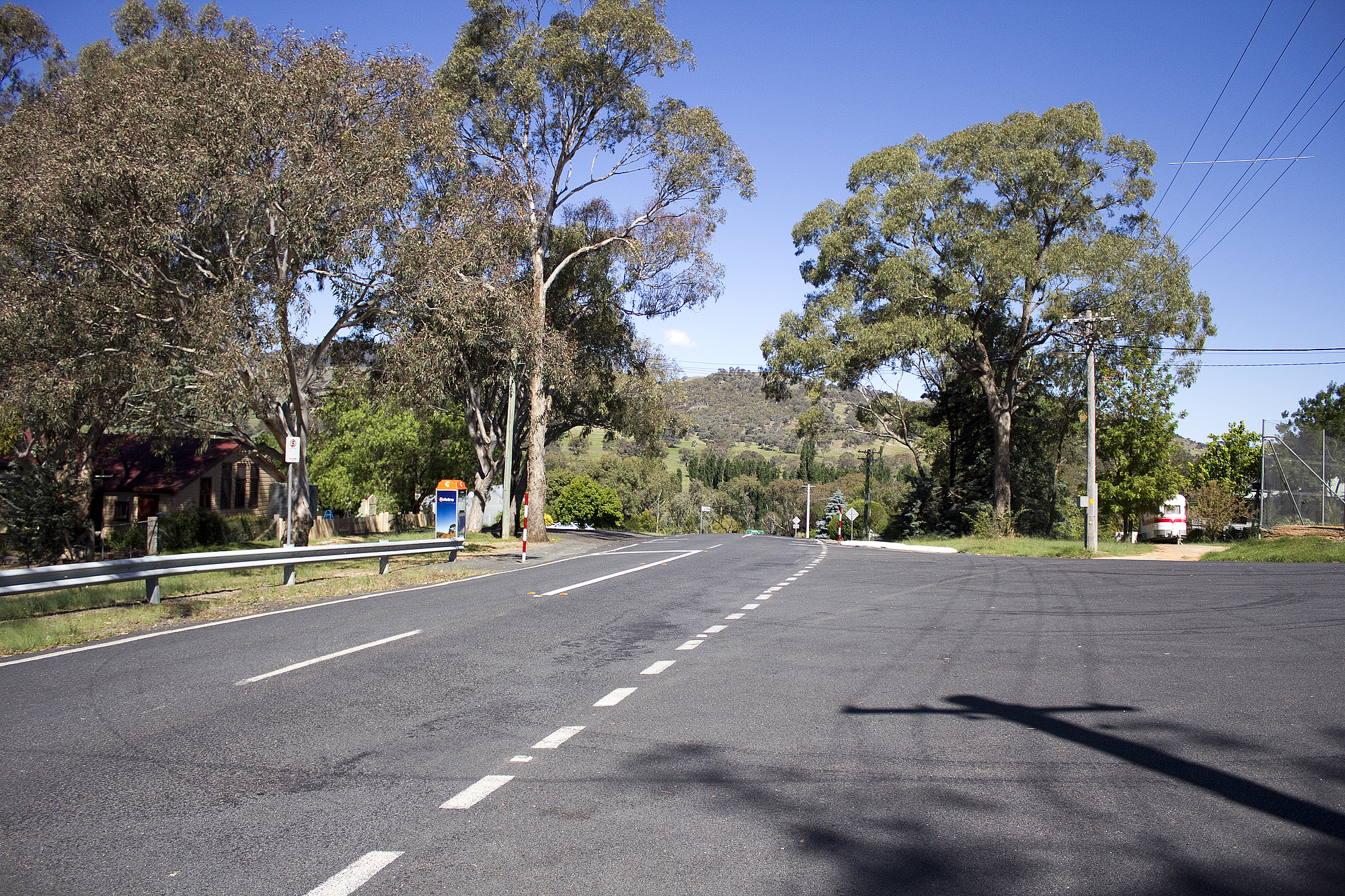
- Looking south-east, towards the Murrumbidgee River, on North Street in Tharwa.

- Interactive map of Paddys River
- Coordinates: 35°30′49″S 149°04′10″E
- Country: Australia
- State: Australian Capital Territory

Government
  - Territory electorate: Brindabella
  - Federal division: Bean
- Gazetted: 12 May 1966

Paddys River is a district in the Australian Capital Territory in Australia.

== Localities ==
- Tharwa
