= David Smith (Australian Capital Territory politician) =

Australian Capital Territory politician

David Smith MP
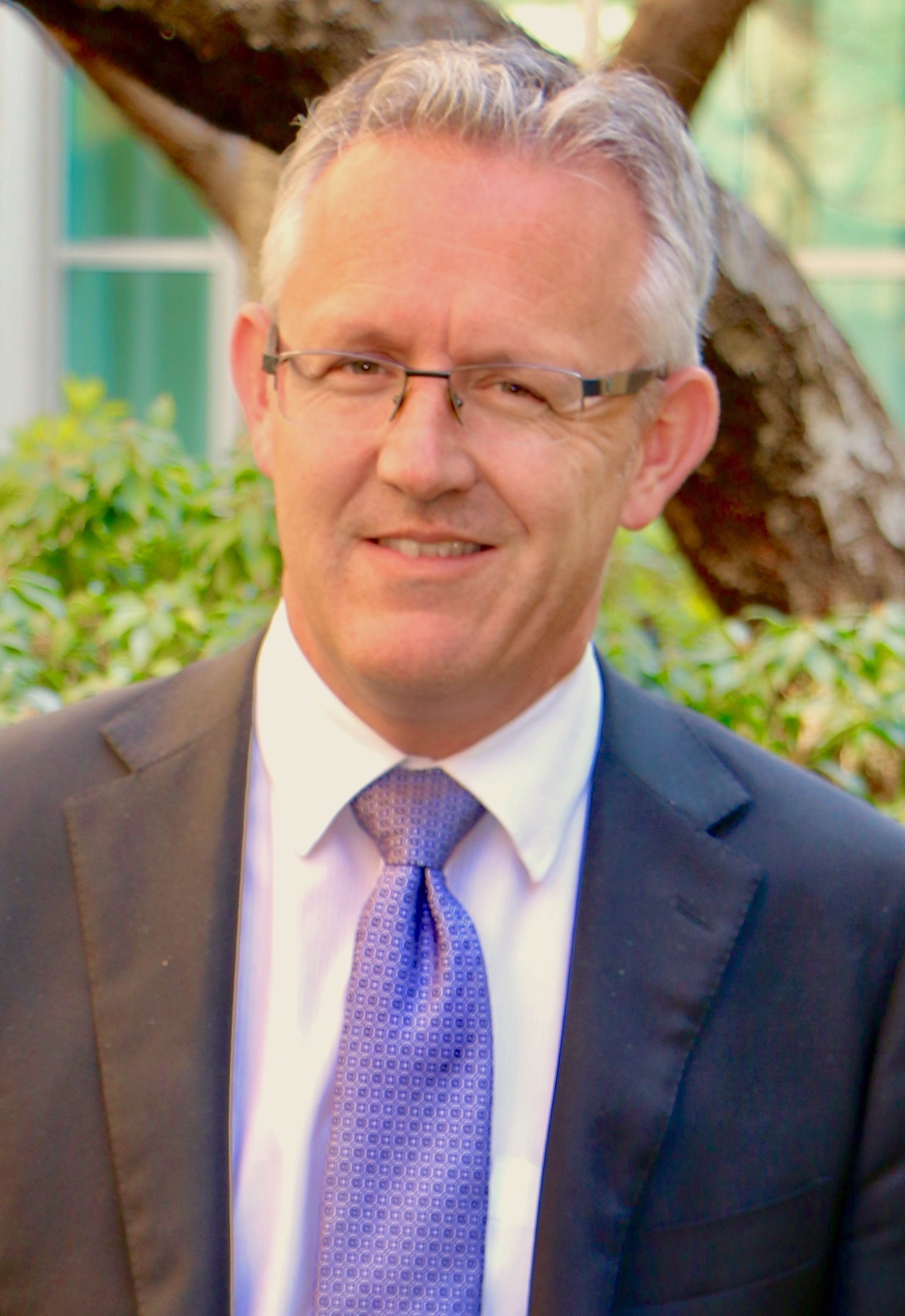
- Smith in 2018

Government Whip in the House of Representatives
- Incumbent
- Assumed office 31 May 2022
- Prime Minister: Anthony Albanese
- Preceded by: Nicolle Flint

Member of the Australian Parliament for Bean
- Incumbent
- Assumed office 18 May 2019
- Preceded by: Division created

Senator for the Australian Capital Territory
- In office 23 May 2018 – 11 April 2019
- Preceded by: Katy Gallagher
- Succeeded by: Katy Gallagher

Personal details
- Born: 25 March 1970 (age 56) Canberra, Australian Capital Territory, Australia
- Party: Australian Labor Party
- Spouse: Liesl Centenera
- Children: 3
- Education: Marist College Canberra
- Alma mater: Australian National University
- Occupation: Trade unionist Public servant
- Website: www.davidsmith.org.au

David Philip Benedict Smith (born 25 March 1970) is an Australian politician. On 23 May 2018, the High Court of Australia declared him elected as a Senator for the Australian Capital Territory after Labor senator Katy Gallagher was found ineligible to have been elected. Before his election, Smith was the ACT director of the Professionals Australia union. He was sworn in to the Australian Senate on 18 June 2018. He was elected to the House of Representatives for the Division of Bean, ACT, at the 2019 federal election.

== Early years and education ==
Smith was born in Canberra, Australian Capital Territory. He completed his schooling at Marist College Canberra, and graduated with a Bachelor of Arts with Honours from the Australian National University in 1993.

== Public service and trade union ==
Before joining the Australian Senate, Smith served in various roles including as an advisor in the Department of Employment and Workplace Relations, as an industrial relations manager for the Australian Federal Police Association, and as a policy advisor in the Australian Capital Territory Chief Minister's Department under Jon Stanhope. In 2007, he took up the role of Director of the ACT branch of Professionals Australia, a union which primarily focuses on technical workers such as scientists, engineers, architects, IT professionals, pharmacists, and others.

== Political career ==
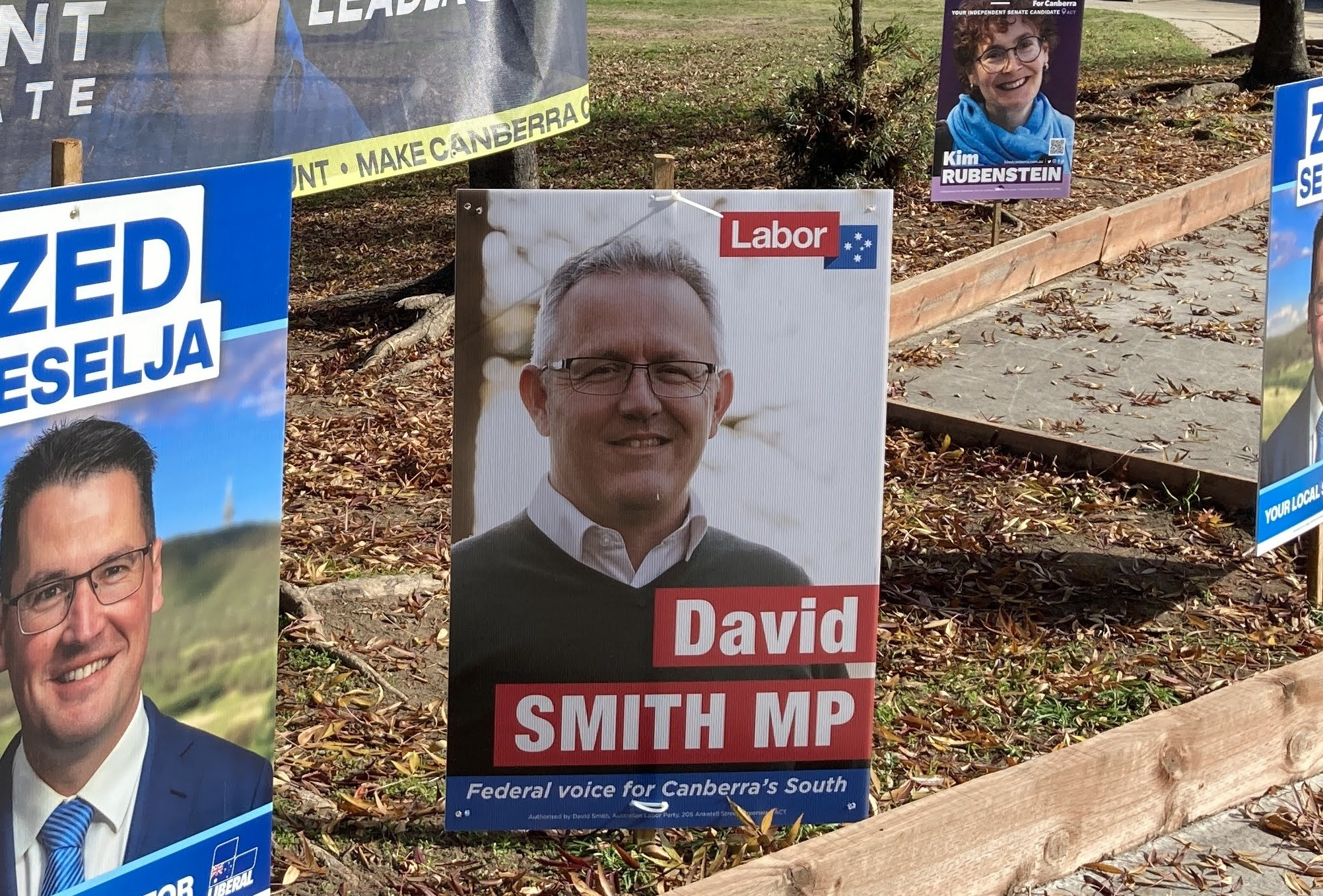
Corflutes for David Smith and other election candidates at a polling station in Wanniassa – May 2022

Smith has been a member of the Australian Labor Party since 1992. He ran for the Senate in 2004, and was the second candidate on the ALP's 2016 Senate ticket. At the 2016 ACT Labor Annual Conference he was elected Senior Vice-president of the ACT Branch of the Australian Labor Party. He says that he was inspired to serve in politics by the judge and attorney general, Terry Connolly.

On 23 May 2018, the High Court of Australia declared him elected as a Senator for the Australian Capital Territory after Labor senator Katy Gallagher was found ineligible to have been elected. He was sworn in on 18 June 2018.

On 1 September 2018, Smith was preselected to run for the Australian Labor Party in the House of Representatives seat of Bean. He resigned from the Senate on 11 April 2019, the day the election was called and the Senate prorogued.

At the 2019 Australian federal election, Smith was elected as the Member for Bean with a margin of 13,971 votes. He was returned to Parliament in the 2022 Australian federal election, now to the Government benches, keeping a substantial margin, winning 62.9% in the two-party preferred count. He was once again re-elected at the 2025 Australian federal election, despite suffering a major swing of 12.61% on the two-candidate preferred count, defeating Independent challenger Jesse Price by only 700 votes.

Smith has served as the Government Whip in the House of Representatives for the Albanese government since its election in 2022. He also serves on the Standing Committee for Selection and co-chairs the Parliamentary Christian Fellowship with Senator Matt O'Sullivan.

== Personal life ==
Having been educated in a Marist Brothers college, Smith identifies as a Catholic. He is married to Liesl Centenera. Together, they have three children: Marcus, Eamonn, and Stella.

Parliament of Australia
New seat	Member for Bean; 2019–present	Incumbent
