= Rendezvous Creek =

District of the Australian Capital Territory

- Interactive map of Rendezvous Creek
- Coordinates: 35°41′37″S 148°56′47″E
- Country: Australia
- State: Australian Capital Territory
- Gazetted: 12 May 1966

Rendezvous Creek is a district in the Australian Capital Territory in Australia.
