= Cotter River (district) =

District of the Australian Capital Territory

- Interactive map of Cotter River
- Coordinates: 35°29′35″S 148°49′13″E
- Country: Australia
- State: Australian Capital Territory
- Gazetted: 12 May 1966

Cotter River is a district in the Australian Capital Territory in Australia.
