= Booth (district) =

- Interactive map of Booth
- Coordinates: 35°43′14″S 149°02′57″E
- Country: Australia
- State: Australian Capital Territory
- Gazetted: 12 May 1966

Booth is a district in the Australian Capital Territory in Australia.
