= Mount Clear (district) =

District of the Australian Capital Territory

- Interactive map of Mount Clear
- Coordinates: 35°51′38″S 148°59′48″E
- Country: Australia
- State: Australian Capital Territory
- Gazetted: 12 May 1966

Mount Clear is a district in the Australian Capital Territory in Australia. It is the southernmost district of the ACT.
