= Tennent (district) =

District of the Australian Capital Territory

- Interactive map of Tennent
- Coordinates: 35.572°S 148.98983°E
- Country: Australia
- State: Australian Capital Territory
- Gazetted: 12 May 1966

Tennent is a district in the Australian Capital Territory in Australia.
