= Tharwa Primary School =

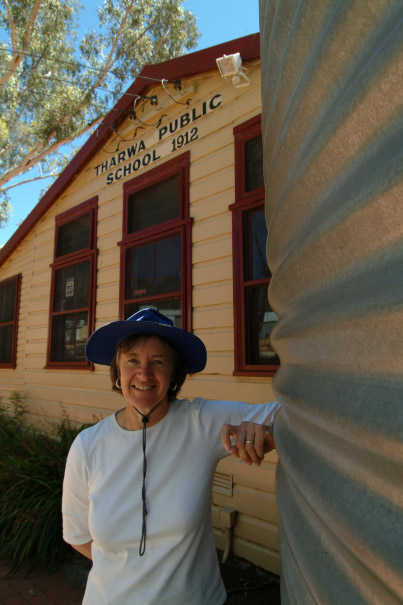

Location
- Tharwa, Australian Capital Territory; 2620; Australia
- Coordinates: 35°30′32″S 149°04′04″E

Information
- Type: Primary school
- Established: 1899
- Closed: 2006
- Website: www.tharwaps.act.edu.au (inactive)

Tharwa Primary School was a primary school in the small village of Tharwa, Australian Capital Territory, Australia. It was built in 1898 and opened in 1899. The school had two classrooms for the primary school, plus a preschool room. While the current school dates from 1912, the site of the school made it the oldest operating school in Canberra until its closure in 2006. The first Parents and Citizens committee was established in 1931.

The first pupil enrolled on 9 August 1899 and the centenary of this event was celebrated by a town ball and the launching a book A Century of Learning: Tharwa Primary School by historian Matthew Higgins. At that time the school only operated on a part-time basis.

In 2006 the government announced it would close Tharwa Primary School by the end of December 2006. An attempt was made to open a private school on the site, but the proposal was thwarted by new restrictions on private schools, enacted by the Legislative Assembly in December 2006. Community attempts to save or reopen the school continued, with the last blog post on the dedicated campaign site being posted in September 2007.

The Tharwa Preschool is still operating. The school and the surrounding community traditionally host an annual Tharwa Bush Fair.

== See also ==
- List of schools in the Australian Capital Territory
