= Stromlo (district) =

- Interactive map of Stromlo
- Coordinates: 35°18′58″S 149°00′37″E
- Country: Australia
- State: Australian Capital Territory
- Gazetted: 12 May 1966

Stromlo is a district in the Australian Capital Territory in Australia. It is situated adjacent to Weston Creek and the Molonglo Valley. The district was the location of the Stromlo Forest pine plantation until its destruction by the 2001 and 2003 Canberra bushfires.

== History ==
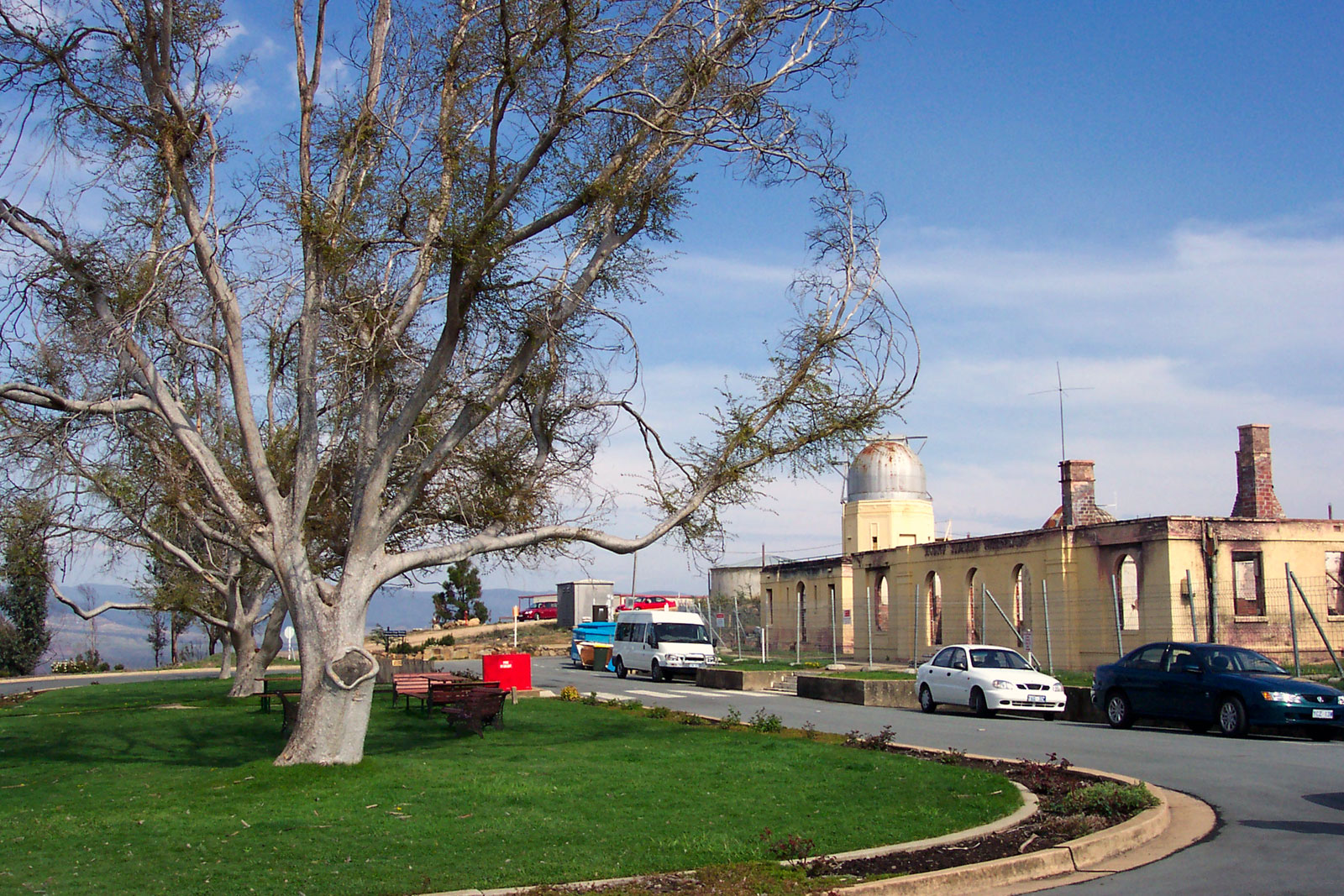
Remains of the old administration building with the dome of the Farnham telescope

The Mount Stromlo Observatory was established in the district (before its establishment) in 1924, although astronomical observations on Mount Stromlo were being carried out as early as 1911. The observatory and a large pine plantation were destroyed in February 1952 due to bushfires. The district of Stromlo was established in 1996 under the Districts Act 1966 No. 5. In 2003, the Stromlo Forest pine plantation and the Mount Stromlo Observatory were destroyed in the 2003 Canberra bushfires. In 2009, the Stromlo Forest Park was opened as a new recreational precinct.
