= Joshua John Moore =

- Moore, as depicted by artist James Moore.
- Born: 1790; Horningsea, Cambridgeshire, England
- Died: 27 July 1864 (aged 73-74); Baw Baw, Australia
- Occupation(s): Land owner, lieutenant in the Royal South Lincoln Militia, grazier

Joshua John Moore (1790 – 27 July 1864) was an English-born grazier, landowner and soldier who owned large lands in Australia.

== Biography ==
Moore was born to yeoman farmer John Moore at Horningsea, Cambridgeshire, England in 1790.

Not much is known about Moore's early life, until, on 25 December 1813, he was drafted into the Royal South Lincoln Militia and trained at Weden Barracks. By August the following year, he was promoted lieutenant, and in September he was transferred to the 14th Regiment of the Militia. It was this regiment which accompanied him in battle at Waterloo. Soon after, however, when he was placed on half-pay, Moore decided to accompany his brother in law, John Wylde, who had recently been appointed Judge advocate of New South Wales, to Sydney,

They arrived on 5 October 1816, on a ship called the Elizabeth, with Wylde making his official landing in the Governor's barge under a salute of thirteen guns on October 12. Moore was thereby appointed Registrar of the Governor's Court and a clerk to Wylde, at a salary of £80. In 1824 the Supreme Court of New South Wales was formally established, and Moore spent some time acting as a prothonotary, until the following year, when his post was abolished. Among other later occupations, Moore became a pastoralist, and a great owner of land.

Moore married his first wife, Sarah Elizabeth, née Hollands (born to David Hollands of Bermondsey, Surrey, a shipowner and shipwright) on 29 March 1825. She, however, died, in 1839, aged 53. Survived by Moore and their only son, Frederick Thomas, Elizabeth was buried at Liverpool, where the two had married. Two years later, Moore married Ann Augusta, daughter of Lieutenant John James Peters, with whom he had four children: two girls and two boys.

Moore died on 27 July 1864, at Baw Baw.

== Land ownership ==
In 1819, Moore was granted (by Macquarie) 500 acres (2 km^{2}) of land at Cabramatta, near Liverpool. He called this piece of land Horningsea Park. He lived at Horningsea until 1839, the year his first wife died. In August 1821, Moore took ownership on land in Baw Baw, where he was given 600 acres (2.4 km^{2}) of land and lived for the most part of his life. Among other things, Moore also took out, in October 1824, a ticket-of-occupation for over 2000 acres (8 km^{2}) of land in an area where Canberra now exists, and in December 1826, he applied to buy some 1000 acres (4 km^{2}) of land that he already occupied for over 3 years, 'situate at Canberry, on the E. bank of the river which waters Limestone Plains, above its junction with the Murrumbeeja, adjoining the grant of Mr Robert Campbell snr'. Moore was informed, 30 April 1827, that under the circumstances he would be allowed to retain possession of 1,000 acres "at Canberry, adjoining the grant of the Hon. Robert Campbell. Senior, Esq."

Moore is known to have been the first pastoralist to ever occupy the land where Canberra, the capital of Australia, is situated presently, preceding Robert Campbell by approximately one year. Despite this, Moore did not take an interest or participate in the establishment and development of the district and area and never lived there.

== Additional Sources ==
- Fitzhardinge, L. F. (1967). "Moore, Joshua John (1790 - 1864)". Australian Dictionary of Biography. Canberra: National Centre of Biography, Australian National University. ISBN 978-0-522-84459-7. ISSN 1833-7538. OCLC 70677943.
