= Duffy, Australian Capital Territory =

Duffy
- Suburb
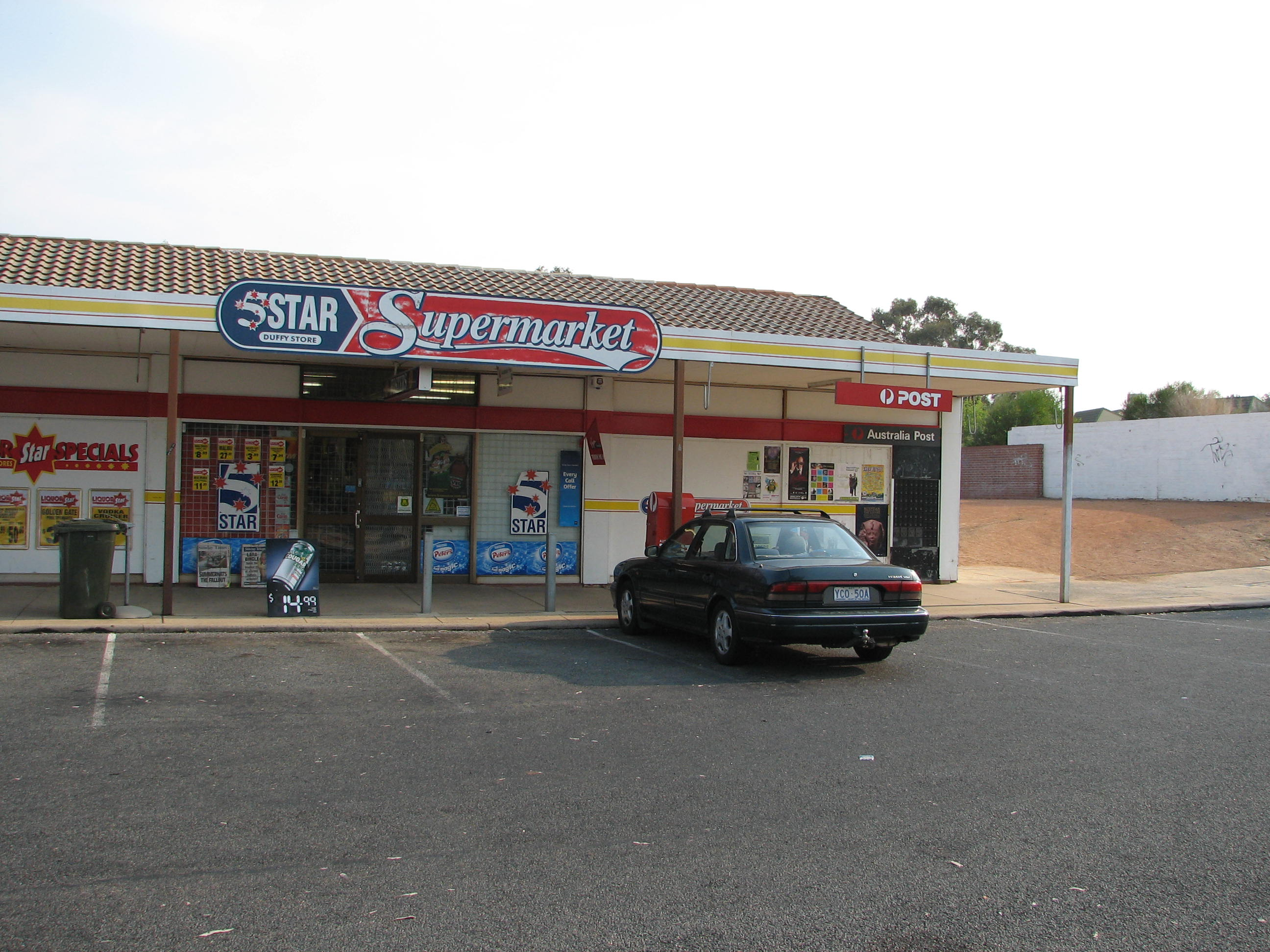
- Duffy shopping centre

- Coordinates: 35°20′13″S 149°02′06″E
- Country: Australia
- State: Australian Capital Territory
- City: Canberra
- District: Weston Creek
- Location: 14 km (8.7 mi) WSW of Canberra CBD; 21 km (13 mi) W of Queanbeyan; 102 km (63 mi) SW of Goulburn; 299 km (186 mi) SW of Sydney
- Established: 1971

Government
  - Territory electorate: Murrumbidgee
  - Federal division: Bean

Area
  - Total: 2.8 km^{2} (1.1 sq mi)
- Elevation: 600 m (2,000 ft)

Population
  - Total: 3,395 (2021 census)
  - Density: 1,213/km^{2} (3,140/sq mi)
- Postcode: 2611
Suburbs around Duffy
Stromlo Forest	Wright	Coombs
Canberra Nature Park	Duffy	Holder
Chapman	Rivett	Rivett

Duffy (postcode: 2611) is a suburb of Canberra, Australian Capital Territory, Australia, located in the district of Weston Creek.

Duffy was named in honour of Charles Gavan Duffy (1816–1903), the 8th Premier of Victoria. Streets in the suburb of Duffy are named after Australian dams and reservoirs.

== History ==
Duffy was gazetted as a placename on 2 July 1970.

The Canberra bushfires of 2003 destroyed about 200 Duffy homes and the local petrol station. Duffy was the suburb that received the most damage in the fires. Narrabundah Hill, which borders the western edge of Duffy, is managed by ACT Forests and had contained a mature pine plantation before the fires. As of 2005, work was under way to plant a new plantation on the hill and surrounding areas.

== Demographics ==
At the 2021 census, Duffy had a population of 3,395 people. Duffy residents had a median age of 39 compared to a Canberra median of 35. The median weekly personal income for people aged 15 years and over was A$1,251 a week, compared to a Canberra wide figure of $1,203 and an Australia wide figure of $805.

The population of Duffy is predominantly Australian-born, 76.6% of people being born in Australia. With 4.2% of the population, the second most common birthplace is England. Accommodation is mostly separate houses (87.4%), with semi detached, row or terrace houses and townhouses comprising 7.9%.

== Suburb amenities ==
=== Educational institutions ===
==== Government schools ====
- Duffy Preschool is located next to the Duffy shops on Burrinjuck Crescent.
- Duffy Primary School is located next to the Duffy shops on Burrinjuck Crescent.

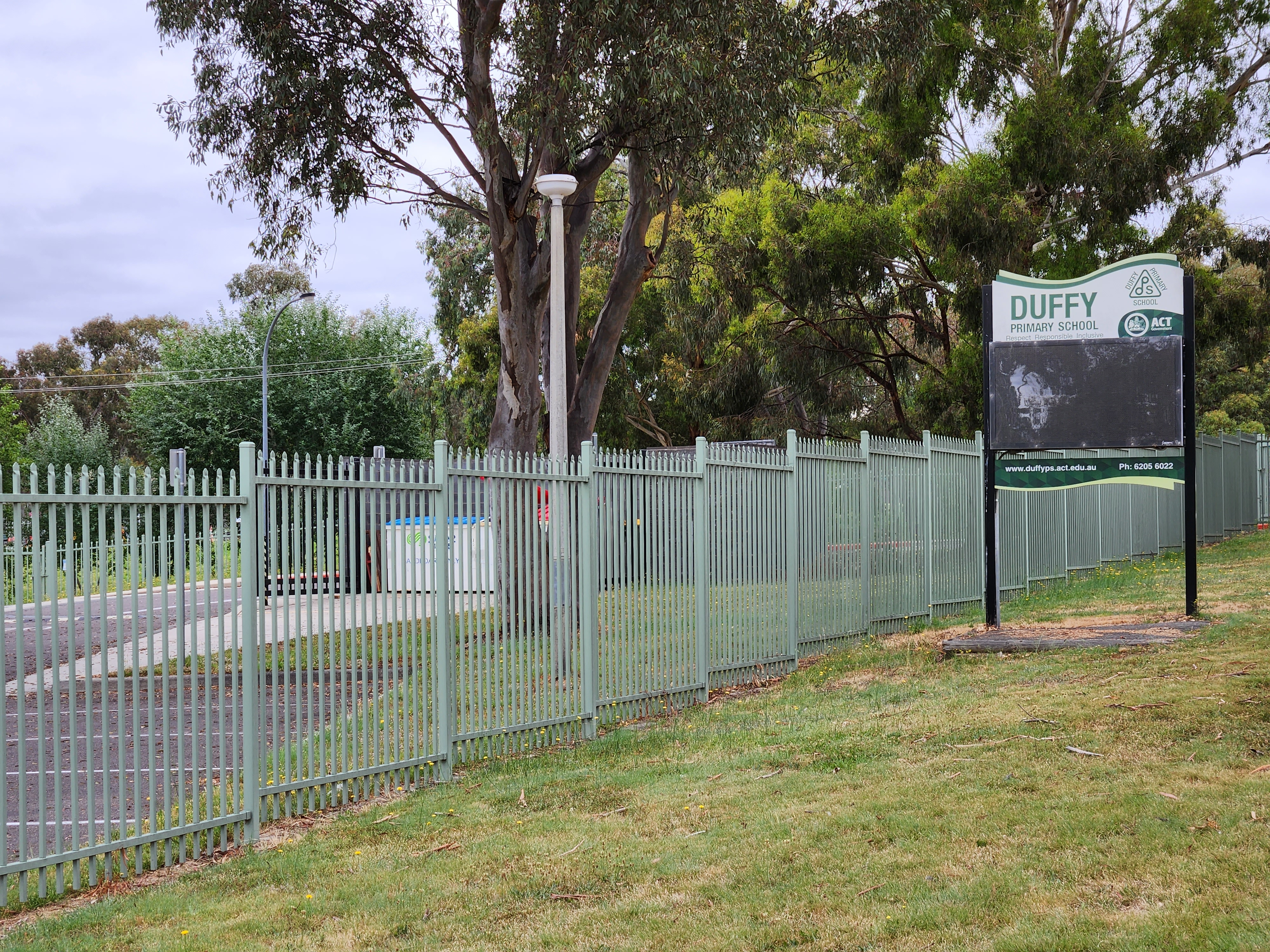
Duffy Primary School

=== Places of worship ===
Horizon Church Canberra, holds a Christmas Festival in the land adjacent to the Duffy Shops each December.

=== Transport ===
- ACTION bus routes R7, 65 & 66 run through the suburb and link to Woden, Cooleman Court and Civic interchanges.
- No other public transportation is available, apart from taxis.

=== Open spaces ===
There is a Duffy community oval located near the government schools. There is a playground at the shops. The playground and surrounding areas were upgraded by the ACT Government in 2023. Upgrade works included: a new playground, nature play elements, two new shade sails and rubber softfall, bike track, new toilet, outdoor furniture including an undercover picnic table and bench seating, accessible paths of travel, including a new ramped path to improve access from Burrinjuck Crescent to the local shops, better landscaping including native and deciduous trees, and 60 shrubs, increased amenity with new bins and a bike rack.

== Geology ==
Rhyodacite from the Deakin Volcanics coloured red-purple, purple or green grey underlie the suburb of Duffy.
