= Waramanga, Australian Capital Territory =

Waramanga
- Suburb
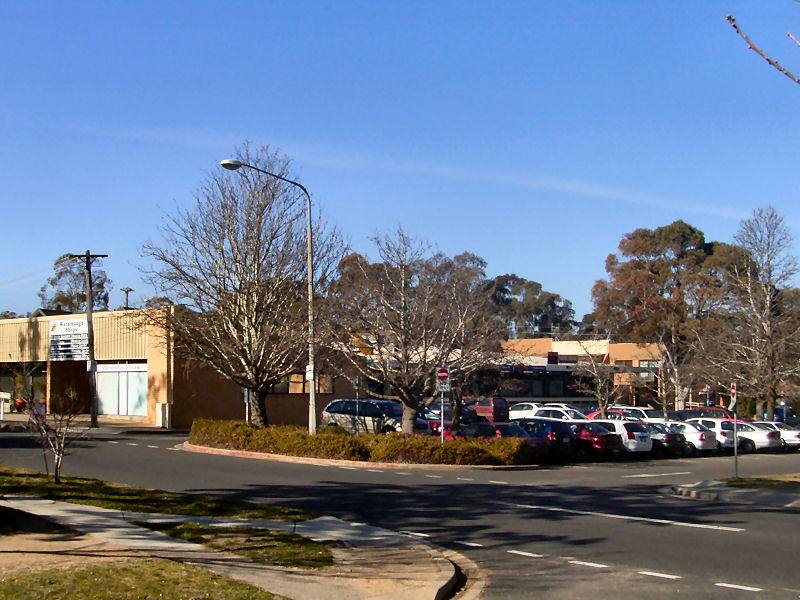
- Waramanga shopping centre

- Coordinates: 35°21′11″S 149°03′47″E
- Country: Australia
- State: Australian Capital Territory
- City: Canberra
- District: Weston Creek
- Location: 13 km (8.1 mi) SW of Canberra CBD; 16 km (9.9 mi) W of Queanbeyan; 105 km (65 mi) SW of Goulburn; 302 km (188 mi) SW of Sydney
- Established: 1968

Government
  - Territory electorate: Murrumbidgee
  - Federal division: Bean

Area
  - Total: 1.7 km^{2} (0.66 sq mi)
- Elevation: 606 m (1,988 ft)

Population
  - Total: 2,785 (2021 census)
  - Density: 1,640/km^{2} (4,240/sq mi)
- Postcode: 2611
Suburbs around Waramanga
Weston	Weston	Lyons
Stirling	Waramanga	Chifley
Chapman	Fisher

Waramanga (/wɒrəmæŋɡə/) (postcode: 2611) is a suburb of Canberra, Australian Capital Territory, Australia in the district of Weston Creek.

Waramanga was established in the late-1960s and was named after the Warumungu people of Central Australia. Streets in the suburb of Warramanga are named after Australian Aboriginal people.

== History ==
The Weston Creek district was part of Yarralumla Station, a 40,000 acre (162 km^{2}) property dating back to 1828. It was resumed by the Commonwealth in 1913 from Frederick Campbell who bought the property in 1881. In 1920 9,000 acres (36 km^{2}) of the Woden Valley, including the Weston Creek district, were subdivided for soldier settlement leases. A 1950s map of the district shows four paddocks, Weston paddock, Track paddock, Brown Hill paddock and Oakey Hill paddock intersecting the area which is now the suburb of Waramanga. Long Gully Road ran through the suburb and the nearest homestead was Cooleman on the Kambah Road just west of the present suburb of Fisher. Cooleman was farmed by the Champion family from about 1932. It was previously known as Allawah and was leased to the Anderson family in 1920. Other properties in the district were Avondale and Weston whose homesteads were in the present suburb of Holder, Yamba in the suburb of Phillip and Iloura, Melrose and Yarra Glen in the suburb of Curtin.

In June 1968 the suburb of Waramanga was officially gazetted.

The bushfire which engulfed parts of Canberra on 18 January 2003 flowed out of Mount Taylor Nature Reserve and reached the eastern boundary of the suburb at Badimara Street where it was slowed by residents and stopped by a contrary wind. For more information about the bushfire see Canberra bushfires of 2003.

== Demographics ==
At the 2021 census, Waramanga had a population of 2,785 people. Waramanga residents had a median age of 38 compared to a Canberra median of 35. The median weekly personal income for people aged 15 years was A$1,179 a week, compared to a Canberra wide figure of $1,203 and an Australia wide figure of $805.

The population of Waramanga is predominantly Australian-born, 74.0% of people being born in Australia. With 3.4% of the population, the second most common birthplace is the England. Accommodation is mostly separate houses (77.3%), with semi detached, row or terrace houses and townhouses comprising 19.6%.

== Politics ==
Waramanga is located in the federal House of Representatives electorate of Bean, which is the largest division in the Australian Capital Territory. The electorate of Bean is represented by David Smith of the Australian Labor Party.

In the ACT Legislative Assembly, Waramanga is part of the electorate of Murrumbidgee. The electorate elects five members on the basis of proportional representation.

== Geology ==
Deakin Volcanics green grey, red, and purple rhyodacite with spherulitic texture fill up Warramanga from beneath.

== Suburb amenities ==
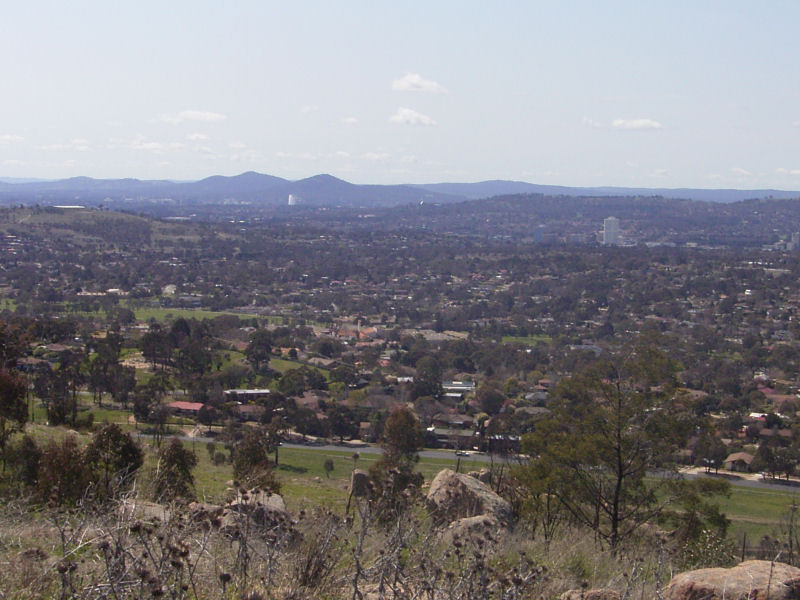
Waramanga, looking northeast from Mount Arawang

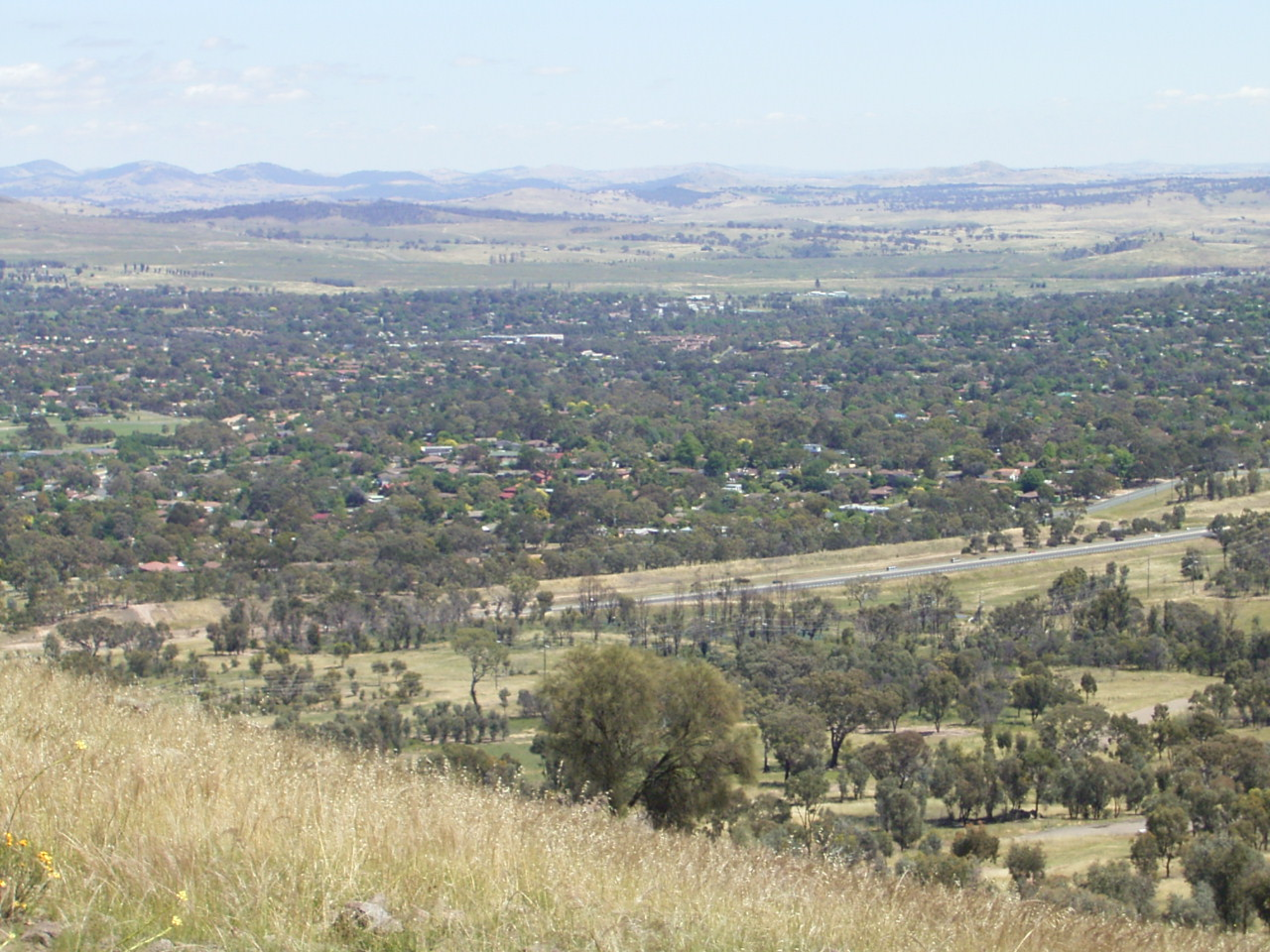
Waramanga, looking northwest from Mount Taylor

Waramanga has a busy local shopping centre on the corner of Damala Street and Waramanga Place. The centre contains a cafe, supermarket, bakery,’Village’ cafe, hairdresser, beauty salon, chemist, newsagency, medical centre and postal agency.

=== Educational institutions located in Waramanga ===
Government schools

- Waramanga Preschool on Nemarang Crescent.
- Arawang Primary on Nemarang Crescent.
- Mount Stromlo High School on the corner of Badimara Street and Namatjira Drive.

Non-government schools and colleges

- St John Vianney Primary in Namatjira Drive.
- Alliance College of Australia in Namatjira Drive.

=== Churches in Waramanga ===
- St John Vianney Parish Centre of the Catholic Church in Australia in Namatjira Drive.
- Woden Valley Alliance Church of the Christian and Missionary Alliance in Namatjira Drive.
- Canberra Korean Manse of the Uniting Church in Australia in Badimara Street.

=== Health facilities in Waramanga ===
- Weston Creek Veterinary Hospital in Badimara Street.
- Waramanga Medical Centre located in the shopping centre on the corner of Damala Street and Waramanga Place.

=== Public Transport in Waramanga ===
- ACTION Buses run regular services to Waramanga. Route 63 services most of Waramanga, on its way between the nearest major bus interchange at Woden Town Centre and the Weston Creek Centre. Routes 70 and 71 provides a link to Tuggeranong Town Centre via Kambah.
- No other public transportation is available, apart from taxis.

Waramanga has extensive open spaces with playing fields on the western side of the suburb, several neighbourhood parks and pedestrian parkland along the ridge in the centre of the suburb. Waramanga is adjacent to Mount Taylor Nature Reserve, part of Canberra Nature Park with grassland and hillside walking tracks and sweeping views across Woden and Tuggeranong Valleys.
