= Stirling, Australia =

There are several places in Australia called Stirling:

- Stirling, Western Australia, a suburb of Perth
- City of Stirling, a local government area of Perth
- Stirling, South Australia, a city and region just east of Adelaide
- Stirling, Australian Capital Territory, a suburb in Canberra
- Division of Stirling, a federal electorate centred on the city of Stirling.
- Electoral district of Stirling, a state electoral district in Western Australia near the city of Albany.
- Stirling Range, a range of mountains in Western Australia north-east the city of Albany
