= 2022 CBR Brave season =

Australian ice hockey team season

2022 CBR Brave
- Goodall Cup champions
- League: 1st AIHL
- 2022 record: 15–0–1–2
- Home record: 9–0–1–0
- Road record: 6–0–0–2
- Goals for: 141
- Goals against: 56

Team information
- Coach: (Australia) Stuart Philps
- Assistant coach: (Australia) Andrew Brunt
- Captain: (Australia) Kai Miettinen
- Alternate captains: (Australia) Bayley Kubara (Australia) Casey Kubara
- Arena: Phillip Ice Skating Centre

Team leaders
- Goals: (Australia) Casey Kubara (25)
- Assists: (Australia) Wehebe Darge (33)
- Points: (Australia) Casey Kubara (52)
- Penalty minutes: (Australia) Joseph Hughes (51)
- Goals against average: (Australia) Alex Tetreault (2.74)

The 2022 CBR Brave season was the Brave's 7th season in the Australian Ice Hockey League since being founded and entering the league in 2014. Canberra completed the double by finishing first in the regular season and winning the grand final in the AIHL Finals, lifting the H Newman Reid Trophy for the third time and Goodall Cup for the second time in franchise history.

== Season notes ==
In February 2022, there was unconfirmed reports the CBR Brave were looking to leave the AIHL and join the newly formed Pacific Hockey League. In late February 2022, Brave CEO, Sunny Singh, publicly committed the team to the AIHL for the 2022 season. Singh said the AIHL had taken profound action in addressing key issues the Brave organisation had leading into the new season.

In April, the team announced the 2022 team roster, team staff and new on-ice leadership team. The Brave's most capped player, Kai Miettinen, was appointed team captain, replacing the departed Matt Harvey. Bayley and Casey Kubara were promoted to alternate captains to assist Kai.

In July 2022, two regular season games involving the Brave and Melbourne Mustangs were first postponed and then cancelled due to flight cancellations. The Brave team were left stranded at Canberra Airport on Saturday morning and despite attempts to rebook were unable to secure a flight to Melbourne on the weekend of 2 and 3 July 2022. The Brave and Mustangs were subsequently unable to come to an agreement to re-arrange the two games before the end of the regular season and by early August the games were officially cancelled. Both teams were awarded three points each for the two cancelled games, sharing in the six points that would have been contested for.

On 31 July 2022, the CBR Brave announced the change in ownership of the team from Sunny Singh to Steve Moeller, with Moeller taking over the General Manager (GM) role within the organisation.

For the final three games of the regular season and the exhibition game against the Central Coast Rhinos, the Brave released gameday programmes for the first time since 2016. Unlike previously, the new programmes were released digitally only and not printed.

In 2022, the Brave setup two charity rounds during the AIHL regular season to raise money for Hockey Fights Cancer and Menslink. The team raised money during the games against the Newcastle Northstars and Sydney Ice Dogs and issued special one-off sweaters that were then auctioned off after the games.

The Brave set two new team records in 2022, securing the team's largest regular season and finals victories.

In recognition of the CBR Brave's achievements in the 2022 season, the team was named Canberra team of the year in the 2022 CBR Sports Awards. The Brave were selected from a field of finalists including ACT Griffins, Canberra Gunners and Tuggeranong Vikings Masters Swimming Club. In addition to team of the year, the Brave were also ranked 20th in the top 25 Australasian Sporting Teams for 2022, produced by Platinum Asset Management and GAIN LINE Analytics.

== Roster ==
Team roster for the 2022 AIHL season

CBR Brave roster - 2022 AIHL season
Active roster		Coaching staff
Goaltenders: -- (Australia) Luke Fiveash; -- (Australia) Wylie Hodder; 29 (Australia) Alexandre Tetreault; 35 (Australia) Aleksi Toivonen; Defencemen: 58 (Australia) Declan Bronte; 27 (Switzerland) Andreas Camenzind; 5 (United States) Garret Cockerill (I); 6 (Australia) Nicholas Doornbos; 22 (Canada) Mike Giorgi; 7 (Australia) Bayley Kubara (A); 61 (Australia) Joseph Maatouk; 20 (United States) Matthew Marasco; 41 (Australia) Matthew Price; 72 (Australia) Alastair Punler; 18 (Australia) Jamie Woodman	Forwards: 71 (Australia) Jordan Brunt; 44 (Australia) Nick Christensen; 9 (Australia) Wehebe Darge; 42 (Australia) Jackson Gallagher; 3 (Australia) Mitchell Henning; 21 (Australia) Joseph Hughes; 15 (Australia) Casey Kubara (A); 85 (Australia) Toby Kubara; 16 (Australia) Tyler Kubara; 11 (Australia) Lyndon Lodge; -- (Italy) Brandon McNally (I); 64 (Australia) Kai Miettinen (C); 51 (Australia) Hamish Murray; 19 (Canada) Mario Valery-Trabucco (I); 14 (Australia) Charlie York; 91 (Australia) Henry York	Head Coach: (Australia) Stuart Philps; Coaches: (Australia) Andrew Brunt; (Australia) Jake Sbroja; (Australia) Andrew Deans; (Australia) Darryl Day; (Australia) Rob Reid; (Australia) Jono Carey; Legend (C) Captain (A) Alternate Captain (I) Import player Statistics; Average age: 26.4; Average height: 183 cm Average weight: 82.16 kg Locals: 27; Imports: 3 Acquired 2022: 13; Acquired pre-2022: 17
Last updated on: 15 August 2022
Elite Prospects

== Transfers ==
All transfers in and out of the team since the last AIHL season.

=== In ===
Pos	Player	Transferred From	Local / Import
D	(Australia) Declan Bronte	(United States) Connecticut Chiefs	Local
D	(United States) Garret Cockerill	(United States) Reading Royals	Import
G	(Australia) Luke Fiveash	No team	Local
G	(Australia) Wylie Hodder	No team	Local
F	(Australia) Toby Kubara	No team	Local
F	(Australia) Lyndon Lodge	(Australia) Perth Thunder	Local
D	(United States) Matt Marasco	No team	Local
W	(Italy) Brandon McNally	(Wales) Cardiff Devils	Import
D	(Australia) Alastair Punler	(Australia) Perth Thunder	Local
G	(Australia) Aleksi Toivonen	(Australia) Melbourne Mustangs	Local
C	(Canada) Mario Valery-Trabucco	(Germany) Hannover Scorpions	Import
D	(Australia) Jamie Woodman	(Australia) Perth Thunder	Local
F	(Australia) Charlie York	No team	Local
C	(Australia) Henry York	No team	Local

=== Out ===
Pos	Player	Transferred To	Local / Import
D	(Australia) Spencer Austin	No team	Local
G	(Canada) Matt Climie	(Slovakia) Bratislava Capitals	Import
W	(Australia) Hayden Dawes	(United States) Lindenwood Lions	Local
G	(Australia) Jakob Doornbos	(Australia) Sydney Ice Dogs	Local
W	(Canada) Jordan Draper	(Germany) Hamburg Crocodiles	Import
G	(Australia) Nickolas Eckhardt	No team	Local
W	(Canada) Jesse Gabrielle	(Slovakia) HK Nitra	Import
D	(New Zealand) Matt Harvey	No team	Local
W	(Canada) Adam Kambeitz	No team	Import
F	(Australia) Jayden Lewis	No team	Local
C	(Canada) Brayden Low	(United States) Reading Royals	Import
D	(Canada) Tyler Mayea	(United States) Birmingham Bulls	Import
D	(United States) Conor Riley	(United States) Adirondack Thunder	Import
D	(Australia) Mark Rummukainen	No team	Local
F	(Australia) Lachlan Seary	—	Local
C	(Switzerland) Chris Williamson	(Canada) Nanton Palominos	Import

== Staff ==
Staff Roster for 2022 AIHL season

CBR Brave Staff
Role	Staff
Head coach	(Australia) Stuart Philps
Assistant coach	(Australia) Andrew Brunt
Team manager	(Australia) Andrew Deans
Equipment manager	(Australia) Darryl Day
Team doctor	(Australia) Rob Reid
Physiotherapist	(Australia) Jono Carey
Strength / conditioning coach	(Australia) Jake Sbroja
Bench official	(Australia) Darren Sault
Bench official	(Australia) Kelly Sault

== Standings ==
=== Regular season ===
Summary

Season	Overall										Home								Away							
Season	P	W	L	OW	OL	GF	GA	GD	Pts	Finish	P	W	L	OW	OL	GF	GA	GD	P	W	L	OW	OL	GF	GA	GD
2022	18	15	2	0	1	141	56	+85	49	1st	10	9	0	0	1	83	35	+48	8	6	2	0	0	58	21	+37

Position by round

Round	1	2	3	4	5	6	7	8	9	10	11	12	13	14	15	16	17	18
Position	1	1	1	1	1	1	1	1	1	3	2	1	1	1	1	1	1	1

Updated to match(es) played on Completed. Source: www.icehockeynewsaustralia.com

League table

Pos	Team	Pld	W	OTW	OTL	L	GF	GA	GD	Pts	Qualification or relegation
1	CBR Brave (C)	18	15	0	1	2	141	56	+85	49	2022 Goodall Cup Finals
2	Newcastle Northstars	20	15	0	2	3	112	74	+38	47	2022 Goodall Cup Finals
3	Sydney Bears	20	10	2	0	8	105	93	+12	34	2022 Goodall Cup Finals
4	Melbourne Mustangs	18	8	0	1	9	89	83	+6	28	2022 Goodall Cup Finals
5	Melbourne Ice	20	3	2	0	15	54	116	−62	13	
6	Sydney Ice Dogs	20	3	0	0	17	66	145	−79	9	

Source: AIHL Elite Prospects
Rules for classification:
Tie-break: 1) points; 2) goal difference; 3) number of goals scored
Points: 3 points for regulation win; 2 points for OT or SO win; 1 point for OT or SO loss; 0 points for regulation loss
Note: CBR Brave and Melbourne Mustangs were awarded 3 points each for 2 cancelled games. Their points tallies reflect this adjustment.
(C) Champion

=== Finals ===
Summary

Season	Finals weekend								
Season	P	W	L	GF	GA	Result	Semi-final	Preliminary final	Goodall Cup final
2022	2	2	–	9	3	Champion	Won 6-1 (Northstars)	–	Won 3-2 (Northstars)

Bracket

Semifinals
2 September – Melbourne
CBR Brave	6
Newcastle Northstars	1
2 September – Melbourne
Sydney Bears	7
Melbourne Mustangs	3

Preliminary final
3 September – Melbourne
Newcastle Northstars	4
Sydney Bears	3

Grand final
4 September – Melbourne
CBR Brave	3
Newcastle Northstars	2

== Schedule & results ==
=== Exhibition games ===
2022 exhibition fixtures and results
Date	Time	Away	Score	Home	Location	Recap
7 AUG	15:30	Central Coast Rhinos	2–12	CBR Brave	Phillip Ice Skating Centre	Ref
27 AUG	17:00	CBR Brave	Cancelled	Brisbane Lightning	Iceworld Boondall	Ref

=== Regular season ===
Matchday	1	2	3	4	5	6	7	8	9	10	11	12	13	14	15	16	17	18	19	20
Arena	A	A	H	A	H	H	H	A	A	H	A	A	A	A	A	H	H	H	H	H
Result	W	W	W	W	W	W	L	W	L	W	W	L	-	-	W	W	W	W	W	W

Updated to match(es) played on Completed. Source: AIHL
A = Away; H = Home; W = Win; L = Loss

2022 fixtures and results
Date	Time	Away	Score	Home	Location	Recap
30 APR	17:00	CBR Brave	10–3	Melbourne Ice	O’Brien Icehouse	
1 MAY	14:00	CBR Brave	6–4	Melbourne Ice	O’Brien Icehouse	
7 MAY	17:30	Sydney Ice Dogs	5–9	CBR Brave	Phillip Ice Skating Centre	
8 MAY	16:30	CBR Brave	14–1	Sydney Ice Dogs	Macquarie Ice Rink	
14 MAY	17:30	Melbourne Ice	1–9	CBR Brave	Phillip Ice Skating Centre	
15 MAY	17:00	Melbourne Ice	3–7	CBR Brave	Phillip Ice Skating Centre	
29 MAY	17:00	Sydney Bears	8–7 (SO)	CBR Brave	Phillip Ice Skating Centre	
4 JUN	16:30	CBR Brave	7–3	Sydney Ice Dogs	Macquarie Ice Rink	
5 JUN	16:30	CBR Brave	4–5	Sydney Bears	Macquarie Ice Rink	
11 JUN	17:30	Sydney Bears	4–11	CBR Brave	Phillip Ice Skating Centre	
18 JUN	16:30	CBR Brave	6–1	Newcastle Northstars	Hunter Ice Skating Stadium	
19 JUN	16:00	CBR Brave	2–3	Newcastle Northstars	Hunter Ice Skating Stadium	
2 JUL	17:00	CBR Brave	Cancelled	Melbourne Mustangs	O’Brien Icehouse	
3 JUL	14:00	CBR Brave	Cancelled	Melbourne Mustangs	O’Brien Icehouse	
10 JUL	16:30	CBR Brave	9–1	Sydney Bears	Macquarie Ice Rink	
16 JUL	17:30	Melbourne Mustangs	4–9	CBR Brave	Phillip Ice Skating Centre	
17 JUL	17:00	Melbourne Mustangs	4–6	CBR Brave	Phillip Ice Skating Centre	
23 JUL	17:30	Newcastle Northstars	3–9	CBR Brave	Phillip Ice Skating Centre	
24 JUL	17:00	Newcastle Northstars	2–8	CBR Brave	Phillip Ice Skating Centre	
13 AUG	17:30	Sydney Ice Dogs	1–8	CBR Brave	Phillip Ice Skating Centre	

=== Finals ===
Goodall Cup semi-final

2 September 2022; 20:30	CBR Brave	6–1 (1–1, 2–0, 3–0)	Newcastle Northstars	O’Brien Icehouse

Game reference

Alex Tetreault
Goalies
Charles Smart
Referees:
Jeff Klinck
Kent Unwin
Linesmen:
David Rehak
Mark Peruzzo

	0 – 1	5:44 – Robert Malloy (Tesarik, Manwarring)
Mitchell Henning (Valery-Trabucco, Cockerill) – 12:19	1 – 1
Joseph Hughes (Camenzind) – 21:29	2 – 1
Joseph Hughes (Unassisted) – 31:02	3 – 1
Wehebe Darge (Bronte, Lodge) – 45:24	4 – 1
Tyler Kubara (Darge, Hughes) – 52:52	5 – 1
Kai Miettinen (Lodge, Henning) – 54:56	6 – 1

12 min
Penalties
6 min
54
Shots
28

Goodall Cup final

4 September 2022; 14:00	CBR Brave	3–2 (2–0, 0–1, 1–1)	Newcastle Northstars	O’Brien Icehouse

Game reference

Alex Tetreault
Goalies
Charles Smart
Referees:
Joey Theriault
Jeff Klinck
Linesmen:
David Rehak
Russel Dow

Joseph Hughes (Cockerill, Brunt) – 09:07	1 – 0
Wehebe Darge (Giorgi) – 10:29	2 – 0
	2 – 1	24:44 – Francis Drolet (Malloy, Tesarik)
Casey Kubara (Darge, Valery-Trabucco) – 53:32	3 – 1
	3 – 2	59:52 – Robert Malloy (Hawes)

10 min
Penalties
12 min
53
Shots
22

== Player statistics ==
Stats for 2022 AIHL season

=== Skaters ===
Regular season
Nat	Player	Pos	M	G	A	P	PIM
(Australia)	Declan Bronte	D	16	3	8	11	8
(Australia)	Jordan Brunt	F	18	4	9	13	4
(Switzerland)	Andreas Camenzind	C	15	14	24	38	12
(Australia)	Nick Christensen	F	15	2	4	6	6
(United States)	Garret Cockerill	D	6	6	6	12	12
(Australia)	Wehebe Darge	W	17	17	33	50	20
(Australia)	Nicholas Doornbos	F	11	0	0	0	6
(Australia)	Jackson Gallagher	W	14	3	1	4	0
(Australia)	Mike Giorgi	D	18	3	11	14	18
(Australia)	Mitchell Henning	F	18	9	7	16	6
(Australia)	Joseph Hughes	W	10	11	9	20	51
(Australia)	Bayley Kubara	D	7	3	8	11	12
(Australia)	Casey Kubara	W	18	25	27	52	8
(Australia)	Toby Kubara	F	16	0	1	1	8
(Australia)	Tyler Kubara	F	16	8	22	30	10
(Australia)	Lynden Lodge	F	6	2	3	5	4
(Australia)	Joseph Maatouk	D	8	0	0	0	4
(United States)	Matthew Marasco	D	9	1	0	1	16
(Italy)	Brandon McNally	W	0	0	0	0	0
(Australia)	Kai Miettinen	F	18	8	13	21	10
(Australia)	Hamish Murray	F	0	0	0	0	0
(Australia)	Matthew Price	D	15	1	7	8	2
(Australia)	Alastair Punler	D	6	0	7	7	10
(Canada)	Mario Valery-Trabucco	C	15	20	26	46	22
(Australia)	Jamie Woodman	D	2	1	3	4	2
(Australia)	Charlie York	F	10	0	1	1	4
(Australia)	Henry York	C	0	0	0	0	0

Finals
Nat	Player	Pos	M	G	A	P	PIM
(Australia)	Declan Bronte	D	2	0	1	1	0
(Australia)	Jordan Brunt	F	2	0	1	1	0
(Switzerland)	Andreas Camenzind	C	2	0	1	1	4
(Australia)	Nick Christensen	F	2	0	0	0	0
(United States)	Garret Cockerill	D	2	0	2	2	4
(Australia)	Wehebe Darge	W	2	2	2	4	2
(Australia)	Nicholas Doornbos	F	–				
(Australia)	Jackson Gallagher	W	1	0	0	0	0
(Australia)	Mike Giorgi	D	2	0	1	1	0
(Australia)	Mitchell Henning	F	2	1	1	2	0
(Australia)	Joseph Hughes	W	2	3	1	4	0
(Australia)	Bayley Kubara	D	2	0	0	0	4
(Australia)	Casey Kubara	W	2	1	0	1	0
(Australia)	Toby Kubara	F	1	0	0	0	0
(Australia)	Tyler Kubara	F	2	1	0	1	0
(Australia)	Lynden Lodge	F	2	0	2	2	2
(Australia)	Joseph Maatouk	D	–				
(United States)	Matthew Marasco	D	1	0	0	0	0
(Italy)	Brandon McNally	W	–				
(Australia)	Kai Miettinen	F	2	1	0	1	0
(Australia)	Hamish Murray	F	–				
(Australia)	Matthew Price	D	2	0	0	0	0
(Australia)	Alastair Punler	D	–				
(Canada)	Mario Valery-Trabucco	C	2	0	2	2	4
(Australia)	Jamie Woodman	D	–				
(Australia)	Charlie York	F	–				
(Australia)	Henry York	C	–				

=== Goaltenders ===
Regular season
Nat	Player	Pos	M	G	A	PIM	SO	MP	GA	GAA	SA	SV	SV%
(Australia)	Luke Fiveash	G	–										
(Australia)	Wylie Hodder	G	–										
(Australia)	Alexandre Tetreault	G	14	0	0	0	0	789	36	2.74	336	300	0.893
(Australia)	Aleksi Toivonen	G	5	0	0	0	0	296	19	3.85	144	125	0.868

Finals
Nat	Player	Pos	M	G	A	PIM	SO	MP	GA	GAA	SA	SV	SV%
(Australia)	Luke Fiveash	G	–										
(Australia)	Wylie Hodder	G	–										
(Australia)	Alexandre Tetreault	G	2	0	0	0	0	120	3	1.50	50	47	0.940
(Australia)	Aleksi Toivonen	G	–										

== Awards ==
Team awards for 2022 season

2022 Brave awards
Award	Recipient
Bravest of the Brave	(Canada) Mario Valery-Trabucco
Best Forward	(Australia) Casey Kubara
Best Defenceman	(United States) Garret Cockerill
Fans Choice	(Australia) Mike Giorgi
Player's Choice	(Canada) Mario Valery-Trabucco
Coach's Award	(Australia) Bayley Kubara
Emerging Brave	(Australia) Declan Bronte
John Lewis Memorial Award	(Australia) Jordie Gavin
Deans Award	(Australia) Scott Stevenson

AIHL awards for 2022 season

2022 AIHL awards
Award	Recipient
Most Valuable Player	(Australia) Casey Kubara
Local Player of the Year	(Australia) Casey Kubara
