= Weston Creek =

- Interactive map of Weston Creek
- Coordinates: 35°20′12″S 149°03′23″E
- Country: Australia
- State: Australian Capital Territory
- Location: 13 km (8.1 mi) SSW of Canberra

Government
  - Territory electorate: Murrumbidgee
  - Federal division: Bean

Area
  - Total: 15.8 km^{2} (6.1 sq mi)

Population
  - Total: 24,630 (2021 census)
  - Density: 1,559/km^{2} (4,037/sq mi)
- Gazetted: 12 May 1966
Localities around Weston Creek
Stromlo	Molonglo Valley	Canberra Central
Stromlo	Weston Creek	Woden Valley
Stromlo	Tuggeranong	Tuggeranong

Weston Creek is a district in the Australian Capital Territory in Australia. The district is subdivided into divisions (suburbs), sections, and blocks. The district comprises eight residential suburbs, situated to the west of the Woden Valley district and approximately 13 kilometres (8.1 mi) southwest of the Canberra City centre. Situated adjacent to the district was the large Stromlo Forest pine plantation until the forest was destroyed by bushfires in 2001 and 2003.

Weston Creek was named in honour of Captain George Edward Weston, a former officer of the East India Company who arrived in Australia in 1829, and was Superintendent of the Hyde Park Convict Barracks in Sydney. In 1841, Weston was granted land in the district now known as Weston Creek.

At the 2021 census, the population of the district was 24,630.

== Establishment and governance ==
Following the transfer of land from the Government of New South Wales to the Commonwealth Government in 1911, the district was established in 1966 by the Commonwealth via the gazettal of the Districts Ordinance 1966 (Cth) which, after the enactment of the Australian Capital Territory (Self-Government) Act 1988, became the Districts Act 1966. This Act was subsequently repealed by the ACT Government and the district is now administered subject to the Districts Act 2002.

== European history ==
The 'four-square-mile' (2560 acre) grant to George Weston at the 'Yarrow-Lumla plains' was completed on 31 October 1831. The land was originally settled by James Martin, a former soldier in the New South Wales Corps, who, in August 1827, applied to the government for permission to rent 2,000 acres (810 ha) of land on which he had already built a dwelling and barn, was grazing cattle and sheep, and had sown 12 acres (4.9 ha) with wheat. Martin's claim, however, was not successful.

Along with the adjacent Woden Valley, the area later became part of the 40,000 acres (16,000 ha) Yarralumla Station. It was owned successively by Sir Terence Aubrey Murray, Augustus Gibbes and Frederick Campbell, until it was resumed in 1913 as part of a land acquisition scheme after the Federal Capital Territory, was declared in 1911.

The earliest homesteads in the valley were Weston (in the present suburb of Holder), Cooleman (on the southern edge of Chapman), The Rivers (corner of Uriarra Rd and Coppins Crossing Rd), Blundell's Homestead (off Coppins Crossing Rd, near the large bend in the Molonglo River), Illoura (present suburb of North Weston) and Avondale (present-day Holder). In the early 1920s, approximately 9,000 acres (3,600 ha) were subdivided for soldier settlement leases.

Weston. John and Ellen Fox were amongst the first settlers in the Weston valley, living at the Weston homestead from the 1860s. The homestead was located near what is now a small reserve on the corner of Calder Crescent and Woolrych Street, Holder. The large pine trees in the reserve were part of the windbreak for the homestead's garden. The driveway to the homestead ran off Cotter Road, and is still visible as a dirt track between Cotter Road and Dixon Drive opposite the YMCA Early Learning Centre. Several of John and Ellen's nine children were born at Weston, and their son David Fox and his wife Margaret later took over the property. In 1920, the Commonwealth Government acquired the land for use in the Soldier Settlement scheme. Hubert (Fred) Dulhunty was then granted a five-year soldier settlement lease of 804 acres (325 ha) (Block 30), which was then expanded to 1,319 acres (534 ha) in 1926 to incorporate most of the Weston property (Block 24A). Dulhunty did not reside at the property, and the Foxs continued to live and work there. Following David Fox's death at age 49 in 1926, Margaret continued to reside at the property, but then moved to nearby Avondale homestead in about 1933. The Weston and Taylor's Hill leases were purchased by John Dent in October 1932, and used for mixed farming and grazing. The Weston lease was then purchased in 1937 by Rudolph and Eileen De Salis. Rudolph was born at Cuppacumalong homestead near Tharwa, and had lived at 'Bondo' near Cooma and 'Yarrawa' near Adaminaby before moving to Weston. Rudolph remained at Weston until he died in February 1957, aged 70. Members of the De Salis family continued to live at Weston up until the late-1960s.

Avondale. Avondale homestead was located off Kambah Lane just to the northeast of the Weston homestead, in the vicinity of what is now a small reserve in De Graaff Street, Holder. The 1,349 acres (546 ha) property (Block 17) extended from Kambah Lane to the west of Narrabundah Hill. Margaret Fox took over the Avondale lease in July 1933. In July 1955 she sold the property to Mr. J. Maguire, owner of nearby Melrose, for £29,000. His son and daughter-in-law, Patrick and Mary Maguire, lived at the property following their marriage in May 1958. The property was resumed in 1968 to allow suburban development in Weston Creek.

The Rivers. In 1926, Aubrey Blewitt was allocated a ten-year soldier settlement lease for Block 13, which he called The Rivers. The 1,120 acres (450 ha) block went from the corner of Uriarra Road and Coppins Crossing Road north to the Molonglo River, an area now incorporated into the new suburb of Denman Prospect. Blewitt had previously been granted 645 acres (261 ha) in present-day North Weston and northern Holder in 1920 (Block 41), but it was resumed in 1925 and incorporated into Block 24 (Weston). In 1946, 412 acres (167 ha) was excised from his block for a pine plantation (designated Block 45). Aubrey continued to farm The Rivers until his death in May 1961. His wife, Mary, continued to work the property until her death in September 1975.

Illoura. Thomas Cargill was offered a ten-year soldier settlement lease for the 1,015 acres (411 ha) Block 26A, which extended from present-day Curtin and Lyons across to present-day North Weston and McCubbin to the west. In 1928 he sold his lease to Guy Tanner, and the Tanner family continued to farm the area until the property was resumed in the early 1970s. The homestead was located just to the southeast of the Tuggeranong Parkway / Cotter Road intersection. A clump of large eucalyptus trees still visible to the left of where the southbound onramp meets the Parkway marks the former location of the homestead.

Allawah. In 1926, Kenneth Anderson was granted a 1,503 acres (608 ha) soldier settlement lease in present-day Fisher and Waramanga, extending across to Mount Taylor (Block 22), and called his property Allawah. In November 1932, with his rent in arrears, he transferred the lease to John and Stella Dent.

Cooleman. Philip and Katherine Champion, previously from the property Weetangerra, purchased part of the Allawah lease in 1936 and renamed their property Cooleman. The property covered much of present day Chapman and Rivett. The homestead was located on the slopes of Mt. Arawang on the southern side of the Weston valley, located in what is now a reserve in Bertel Crescent, Chapman. Cooleman continued as a sheep run until residential construction in Weston Creek commenced around 1970. The Champions moved to a suburban home in Waramanga.

=== Early roads and landmarks ===
In 1914, the three main roads running into the Weston Creek district were Uriarra Road (now Cotter Road) from the northeast, Long Gully Road from the southeast (through present-day Waramanga), and Kambah Lane from the south. Uriarra Road followed the current day Cotter Road from Weston Creek past the Yarralumla Woolshed and then across through present-day Kingston to Queanbeyan, passing just south of where Parliament House now sits. Cotter River Road branched off Uriarra Road near the present-day RSPCA site. Long Gully Road came into the valley through present-day Waramanga and ran to the west to what is now the corner of Streeton Dr and Darwinia Tce, between Stirling and Rivett. The route of the original road is still easily discernible on present day maps, as it followed what is now green space between Nagara St and Nemarang Cres in Waramanga, then across the playing fields to Namatjira Dr, and then along the green space over Fremantle Dr to the corner of Streeton Dr and Darwinia Tce. Long Gully Road then intersected with the north-south running Kambah Road.

Kambah Lane ran south from Uriarra Road (the intersection was in the present-day suburb of Coombes), through the suburb of Holder to the corner of Dixon Drive and Hindmarsh Drive, and then through the present-day suburb of Rivett. The intersection of Kambah Lane and Long Gully Road was situated within present-day Stirling Oval. A bitumen stretch of the original Kambah Lane and a narrow concrete bridge are still clearly visible opposite 134 Dixon Drive. Kambah Pool Road branched off Kambah Lane within the present day suburb of Kambah. Prior to the development of Tuggeranong, Namatjira Drive between Chapman and Fisher (a sealed road) turned into the remainder of Kambah Lane (a gravel road which was sealed in 1972). This provided access to the Kambah Pool reserve for residents in the Woden/Weston Creek area.

Early landmarks in the district were Narrabundah Hill (still Narrabundah Hill, west of Duffy), Dawson Hill (now Calder Pl, Holder), Mount Stromlo to the northwest, and Taylor's Hill to the southeast (now Mt Taylor). Western Creek (later known as Weston Creek) followed the course of the present day stormwater drain just to the east of Weston Creek Centre, then along present day Streeton Drive and into the Molonglo River (where present day Weston Creek still terminates).

== Demographics ==
At the 2011 census, there were 22,746 people in the Weston Creek district; of these, 48.8 per cent were male and 51.2 per cent were female. Aboriginal and Torres Strait Islander people made up 1.2 per cent of the population, which was lower than the national and territory averages. The median age of people in the Weston Creek district was 40 years, which was higher than the national median of 37 years. Children aged 0 – 14 years made up 19.2 per cent of the population, and people aged 65 years and over made up 17.0 per cent of the population. Of people in the area aged 15 years and over, 53.2 per cent were married and 11.3 per cent were either divorced or separated.

Between the 2001 census and the 2006 census, the population in the Weston Creek district decreased by 0.94 per cent; and in the subsequent five years to the 2011 census, the population grew by 2.8 per cent. When compared with total population growth of Australia for the same periods, being 5.78 per cent and 8.32 per cent respectively, population growth in the Weston Creek district was significantly lower than the national average. The median weekly income for residents within the Weston Creek district was significantly higher than the national average, and marginally lower than the territory average.

At the 2011 census, the proportion of residents in the Weston Creek district who stated their ancestry as Australian or Anglo-Saxon exceeded 72 per cent of all residents (national average was 65.2 per cent). In excess of 49 per cent of all residents in the Weston Creek district nominated a religious affiliation with Christianity at the 2011 census, which was approximately equal to the national average of 50.2 per cent. Meanwhile, as of the census date, compared to the national average, households in the Weston Creek district had a lower than average proportion (15.1 per cent) where two or more languages are spoken (the national average was 20.4 per cent); and a higher proportion (85.0 per cent) where English only was spoken at home (the national average was 76.8 per cent).

== Representation ==
Weston Creek is represented by:

- ACT Legislative Assembly: The Australian Capital Territory (ACT) was granted self-government by the Commonwealth Parliament in 1988 with the passage of the Australian Capital Territory (Self-Government) Act 1988. The first Assembly was elected in 1989. There are currently 25 members of the Legislative Assembly (MLAs). Members are elected every four years by the people of the ACT to represent them and make decisions on their behalf. The ACT Legislative Assembly has five multi-member electorates: Yerrabi, Ginninderra, Kurrajong, Murrumbidgee, and Brindabella, each electing five members.
- Weston Creek Community Council: Weston Creek Community Council (WCCC) is recognised by the ACT Government and provides the residents of the district with a forum to convey concerns to the government and lobbies the government and bureaucrats for services and facilities for Weston Creek. The WCCC is not a local government.

== Demographics ==
Selected historical census data for the Weston Creek district
Census year		2001	2006	2011
Population	Estimated residents on census night	22,338	22,127	22,746
Population	District rank in terms of size within the Australian Capital Territory	6th	6th	6th
Population	Percentage of the Australian Capital Territory population			6.4%
Population	Percentage of the Australian population	0.12%	▼0.11%	0.11%
Cultural and language diversity				
Ancestry, top responses	Australian			28.6%
Ancestry, top responses	English			25.5%
Ancestry, top responses	Irish			10.5%
Ancestry, top responses	Scottish			8.1%
Ancestry, top responses	German			3.4%
Language, top responses (other than English)	Italian	1.2%	▼1.1%	▼1.0%
Language, top responses (other than English)	Mandarin	n/c	▲0.6%	▲0.9%
Language, top responses (other than English)	German	0.8%	0.8%	▼0.7%
Language, top responses (other than English)	Croatian	0.9%	0.9%	▼0.7%
Language, top responses (other than English)	Spanish	0.7%	▼ n/c	▲0.7%
Religious affiliation				
Religious affiliation, top responses	No Religion	21.1%	▲24.7%	▲30.1%
Religious affiliation, top responses	Catholic	28.8%	▼28.2%	▼27.4%
Religious affiliation, top responses	Anglican	18.5%	▼17.3%	▼15.8%
Religious affiliation, top responses	Uniting Church	5.3%	▼4.9%	▼3.9%
Religious affiliation, top responses	Presbyterian and Reformed	3.7%	▼3.2%	▼2.7%
Median weekly incomes				
Personal income	Median weekly personal income		A$737	A$910
Personal income	Percentage of Australian median income		158.2%	▼157.7%
Family income	Median weekly family income		A$1,819	A$2,258
Family income	Percentage of Australian median income		155.3%	▼152.5%
Household income	Median weekly household income		A$1,517	A$1,831
Household income	Percentage of Australian median income		147.7%	▲148.4%

== Sewage treatment plant ==
Weston Creek was the site of Canberra's main sewage treatment plant from the early days of Canberra's settlement up until the late-1970s. Located by the river down the hill from the present day RSPCA site, the plant was proposed as early as 1915. Following several studies, it was approved for construction by the Federal Capital Advisory Committee in January 1924, and commenced operating in 1927. Sewage from the fledgling city of Canberra was pumped to the site through an underground pipe from the vicinity of the Canberra Hotel, through the Yarralumla area. In the late-1960s, odours from the plant became a problem in the expanding residential areas of Woden and Weston Creek, and also at nearby Government House. Several refinements were made to the plant, and the sludge drying beds were abandoned. The plant was closed in August 1978 and replaced by the new Lower Molonglo Water Quality Control Centre.

In December 2010, during excavation work to construct the North Weston Pond as part of the new Molonglo Valley development, 90,000 tonnes of asbestos-contaminated waste were discovered buried near the former sewerage treatment plant site. The contaminated soil contained asbestos sheets and pipes that were dumped at the site by builders from around Canberra during the late 1970s and early 1980s.

== Residential development ==
The plan to develop Weston Creek as a residential district was announced by the National Capital Development Commission in September 1966. It was expected to house 10,000 residents, and was to be regarded as an extension of the Woden Valley. The names of its first two suburbs, Waramanga and Fisher, were announced on 4 June 1968, with the first residents moving in around September 1969. The first 56 residential blocks offered in Waramanga under restricted conditions went at auction for an average of $1,326 each in October 1969.

Hindmarsh Drive was extended from Woden Valley into Weston Creek in late-1968 to serve as the main arterial road into the new district. Streeton Drive connecting Cotter Road with Hindmarsh Drive was then constructed in early 1970.

Six further suburbs were constructed in the Weston Creek district between 1969 and 1972: Weston and Rivett in 1969, Duffy and Holder in 1970, and Chapman and Stirling in 1972. Each suburb is named after a notable Australian, and the street names in each suburb follow a specific theme such as Australian rivers, native flowers, or names of surveyors. Work on the district shopping centre, Cooleman Court, commenced in March 1977. The centre opened on schedule a year later in March 1978. The new shopping centre in Brierly Street included a Woolworths supermarket, Fosseys store and 52 smaller shops. The name 'Cooleman Court' and its logo were selected from a competition involving the local community. The name was inspired by the Cooleman Homestead settled in the district by Mr Phillip Champion in 1937. The logo, a circle divided into eight parts, was intended to symbolise the eight suburbs of Weston Creek served by the new shopping complex.

== Bushfires ==
Situated on Canberra's western edge adjacent to open farmland and formerly large pine plantations, the Weston Creek district has been affected by several serious bushfires. The more notable fires have been:

- February 1952 – Several observatory buildings and equipment were damaged and more than 100,000 pine trees destroyed when a bushfire swept across Mount Stromlo and into the Weston valley on 5 February 1952.
- December 2001 – Fire swept through the Stromlo Pine Forest adjacent to Weston Creek on 24 Dec 2001, threatening the suburbs of Duffy, Holder, Weston, Curtin and Yarralumla. It burnt areas of the National Zoo & Aquarium and Government House, and reached Adelaide Avenue, Deakin, before being contained.
- Canberra bushfires of 2003 – Weston Creek was hard hit by the bushfires that entered Canberra's suburbs on 18 January 2003, with nearly 500 homes destroyed and four people killed. Duffy bore the brunt of the bushfires with 219 homes destroyed, while parts of Chapman, Holder, Rivett and Weston also suffered significant damage. A Bushfire Memorial was established in nearby Stromlo and opened on 18 January 2005.

== Community ==
Local sports teams include the Weston Molonglo Football Club (formally known as Weston Creek Soccer Club), Royals (Rugby Union), Weston Creek Wildcats (Australian rules football) (formerly Western Creek Lions), Weston Creek Indians (Baseball), a men's and women's Lawn Bowls team and Weston Creek Molonglo Cricket Club (formerly Weston Creek Cricket Club). Established in September 1972, notable players in the cricket club include Greg Irvine (from 1979), Michael Bevan (1985), Huntley Armstrong (1985) and even star rugby player George Gregan (1990). There is also a Weston Creek netball competition, called Arawang, comprising several teams.

Junior sporting groups are also well represented with the Weston Creek Little Athletics centre being established in 1976. The centre currently trains and competes at Chapman oval every Saturday during the summer months.

The district has only one public high school. Named Mount Stromlo, the school is located in the suburb of Waramanga. Until the 1990s there were two public high schools – Mount Stromlo High School, originally called Weston Creek High School, and Holder High School, located in Holder. Holder High School was closed in 1991 and the two schools merged to become Mount Stromlo High.

The Weston Creek valley was serviced by one senior secondary college, Stirling, which opened in 1977. In 1997, the Stirling College amalgamated with Phillip College to become the Canberra College. Initially, the united colleges ran out of both Woden and Weston campuses. The mainstream student body gradually moved to the Woden campus, leaving an alternative education set of programmes at the Weston campus. The CCCares (Canberra College Cares) programme is the only remaining element of the Canberra College in Weston Creek, running in the old Stirling complex, catering for the needs of pregnant and parenting students from the ACT and nearby regional areas.

The Australian Defence College's Centre for Defence and Strategic Studies (CDSS) and Australian Command and Staff College (ACSC) are both located at Weston Creek.

Horizon Church Canberra holds services at the Weston Neighbourhood Hall, the Reformed Church of Canberra meets in Rivett, and the Woden Valley Alliance Church meets in Waramanga.

== Notable residents ==
- George Gregan – former Wallabies captain, played cricket for Weston Creek while growing up.
- Michael Bevan – former Australian representative cricketer, grew up in, and played cricket for, Weston Creek.
- Helen Razer – author and ABC Radio host grew up in Weston Creek.
- Robert de Castella – former marathon runner, lived in the Weston Creek suburb of Chapman prior to the 2003 bushfire.
- Katy Gallagher – former Chief Minister of the Australian Capital Territory, now a Federal Senator, grew up in Weston Creek and attended Duffy Primary School.
- Sir David Martin – former Rear Admiral and Governor of New South Wales, resided for a time in Weston Creek.

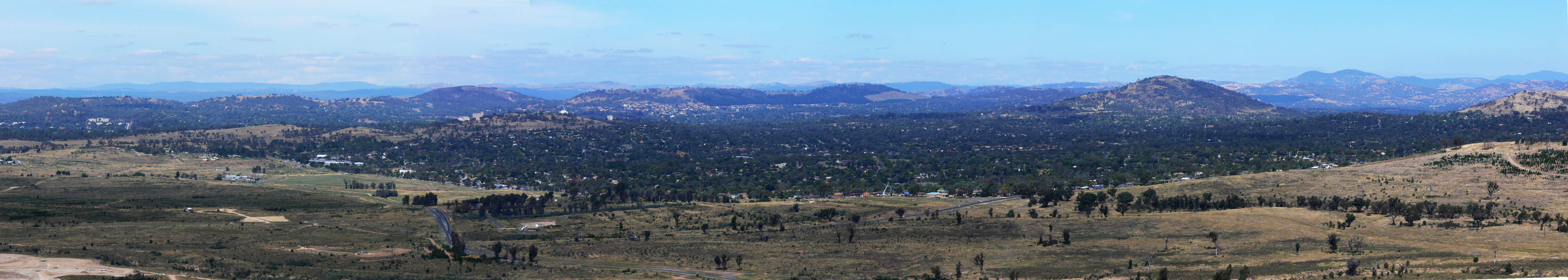
Weston Creek seen from Mount Stromlo, looking south-east.
