= Rivett, Australian Capital Territory =

Rivett
- Suburb
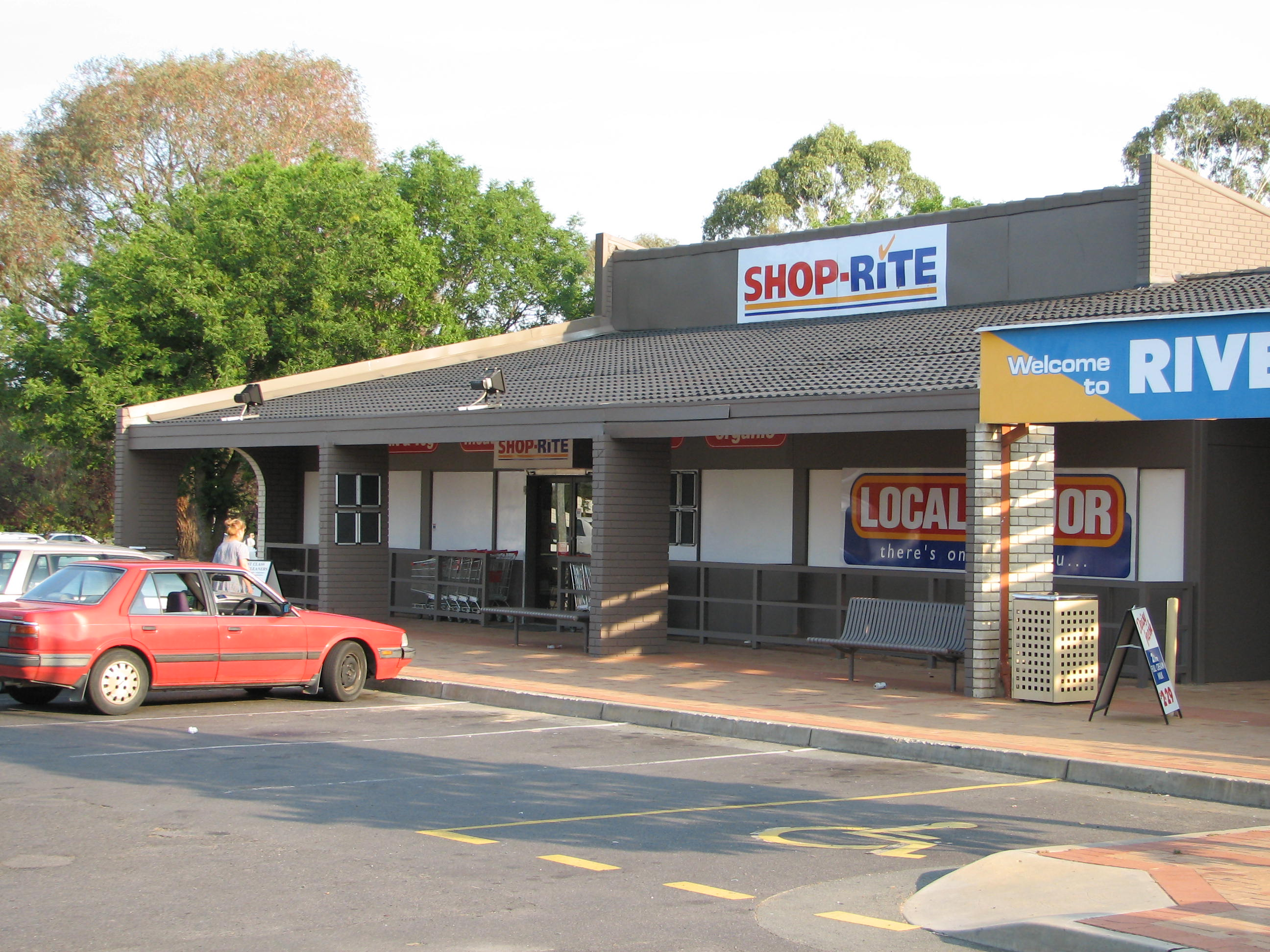
- Rivett shopping centre in 2007

- Coordinates: 35°20′53″S 149°02′17″E
- Country: Australia
- State: Australian Capital Territory
- City: Canberra
- District: Weston Creek
- Location: 15 km (9.3 mi) SW of Canberra CBD; 20 km (12 mi) W of Queanbeyan; 103 km (64 mi) SW of Goulburn; 300 km (190 mi) SW of Sydney
- Established: 1970

Government
  - Territory electorate: Murrumbidgee
  - Federal division: Bean

Area
  - Total: 1.6 km^{2} (0.62 sq mi)
- Elevation: 613 m (2,011 ft)

Population
  - Total: 3,354 (2021 census)
  - Density: 2,100/km^{2} (5,430/sq mi)
- Postcode: 2611
Suburbs around Rivett
Duffy	Holder	Weston
Duffy	Rivett	Stirling
Cooleman Ridge	Chapman	Chapman

Rivett (/rɪvɛt/) (postcode: 2611) is a residential suburb of Canberra, Australian Capital Territory, Australia, established in the late 1960s. At the 2021 census, Rivett had a population of 3,354. It is situated on the western edge of the Weston Creek district.

Rivett takes its name from Sir David Rivett, the professor of Chemistry at the University of Melbourne (1924–1927), deputy chairman and chief executive officer of the Council for Scientific and Industrial Research (CSIR, 1927–1946), chairman of the council of CSIRO (1946–1949), and president of Australian and New Zealand Association for the Advancement of Science (1937–1939).

Streets in Rivett are named after Australian flora.

Several homes in Rivett were burnt, and many residents evacuated during the 2003 Canberra bushfires.

== Suburb amenities ==
=== Shops ===
The Rivett local shopping centre is located at Rivett Place (off Bangalay Crescent). The centre contains a supermarket, newsagency, hairdresser, a cafe, therapeutic masseuse and bakery.

=== Educational institutions ===
Rivett Preschool is located in Nealie Place off Bangalay Crescent. There are no non-government schools or colleges in Rivett.

=== Places of worship ===
The Reformed Church of Canberra of the Christian Reformed Churches of Australia is located behind the shopping centre off Rivett Place.

=== Health facilities ===
The Burrangiri Respite Services day care for elderly people near the shopping centre.

=== Transport ===
ACTION buses run regular services to Rivett. Route 64 services most of Rivett and links to Chapman, Cooleman Court and Woden Town Centre.

No other public transportation is available, apart from taxis.

=== Open spaces ===
Rivett has extensive open spaces with playing fields on the western side of the suburb across from the shopping centre, several neighborhood parks and pedestrian parkland weaving through the suburb.

== Geology ==
Deakin Volcanics red-purple and green grey rhyodacite with spherulitic texture cover most of Rivett except for Laidlaw Volcanics grey tuff on the southernmost quarter. Quaternary alluvium covers the centre.
