= Lower Molonglo Water Quality Control Centre =

Treatment plant in Canberra, ACT

Coordinates: 35°14′48″S 148°58′16″E

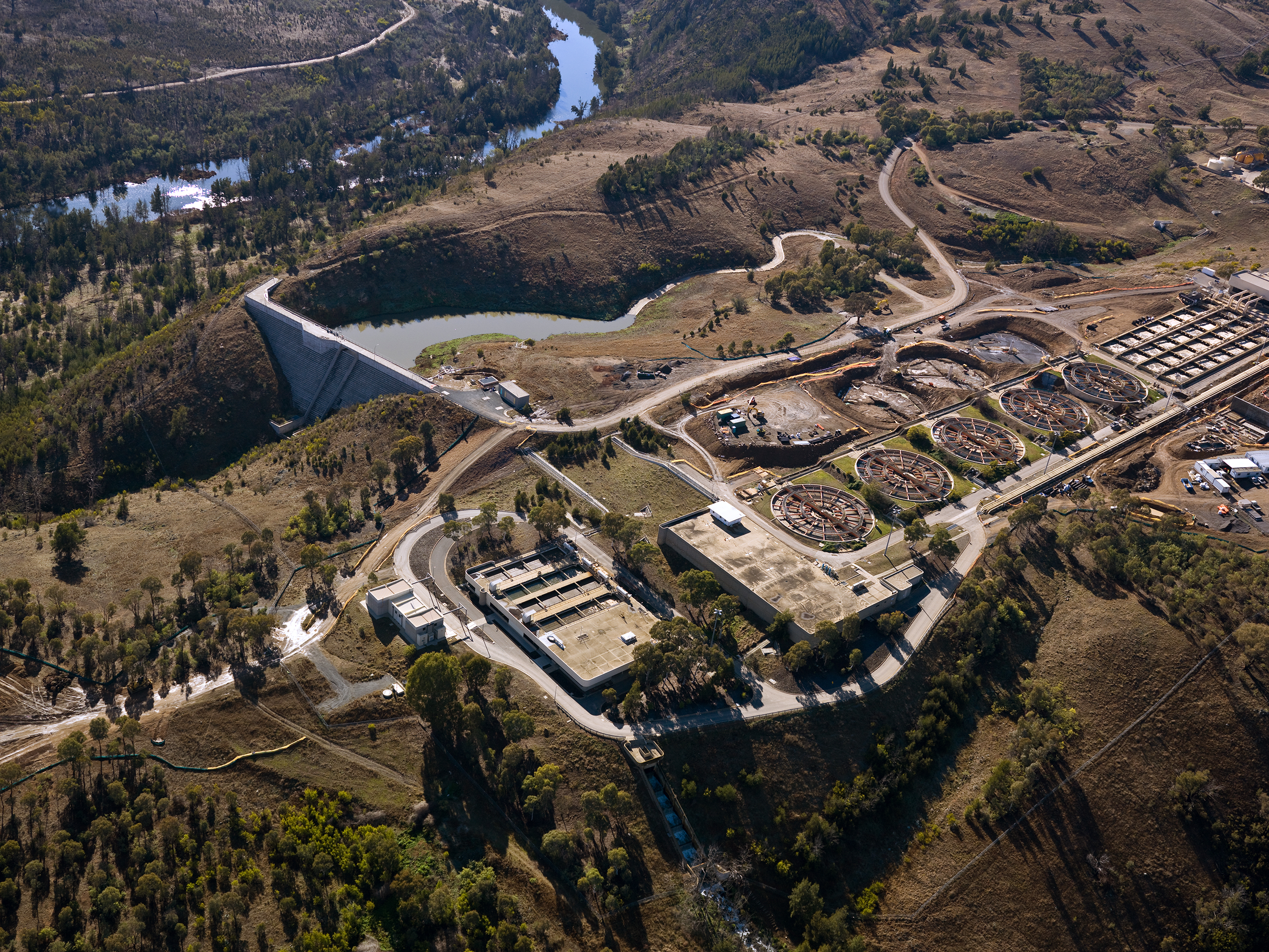
Aerial view of Canberra Sewage treatment works on the Murrumbidgee and Molonglo Rivers

The Lower Molonglo Water Quality Control Centre is a sewerage and waste water treatment facility in the Australian Capital Territory, owned and operated by Icon Water.

The Lower Molonglo Water Quality Control Centre (or LMWQCC) is the largest inland treatment facility in Australia, treating more than 90 million litres of Canberra's wastewater (including sewerage) per day using a combination of physical, chemical, and biological methods.

The centre treats waste to an extent that much of it may be safely released back into the environment by way of the Molonglo River. Solid waste is however separated during treatment and incinerated at high temperatures resulting in an ash that is sold to local farmers and gardeners as a fertiliser.

== Certifications ==
The Centre was Australia's first waste treatment facility to gain two significant international standard certifications:

- AS/NZS ISO 9002 - Quality Management Systems
- AS/NZS ISO 14001 - Environmental Management Systems

== Environmental role ==
Given Canberra's inland location, the centre is vital to ensuring the health of rivers and local eco-systems by reducing pollution and ensuring adequate water flows, to some extent making up for water taken from rivers and stored in catchments for the national capital.

== Risks to Canberra ==
The treatment of waste water involves the use of strong chemicals, many of which are toxic. Following the 2003 Canberra bushfires, in which the plant was damaged, two hazards were shown to exist regarding the water treatment facility, the first of which was the disastrous consequences of fire impacting such chemicals. It was revealed in testimony by fire officer Dannie Camilleri that had fire impacted and breached tanks storing chlorine at the centre (as well as other chemicals), it would have caused a disastrous situation, releasing toxic gas and requiring large scale evacuations of the national capital.

The other hazard revealed was the inadequacy of storage at the centre in the event of a failure. The bushfires damaged the plant to such an extent that treatment was halted. Reserve tanks had storage sufficient for only an extra day. Had the plant not been fixed in time, excess waste and untreated effluent would have been expelled into the Molonglo river causing serious ecological and public health consequences.

== Engineering heritage award ==
The Centre received an Engineering Heritage National Marker from Engineers Australia as part of its Engineering Heritage Recognition Program.
