= Holder, Australian Capital Territory =

Holder
- Suburb
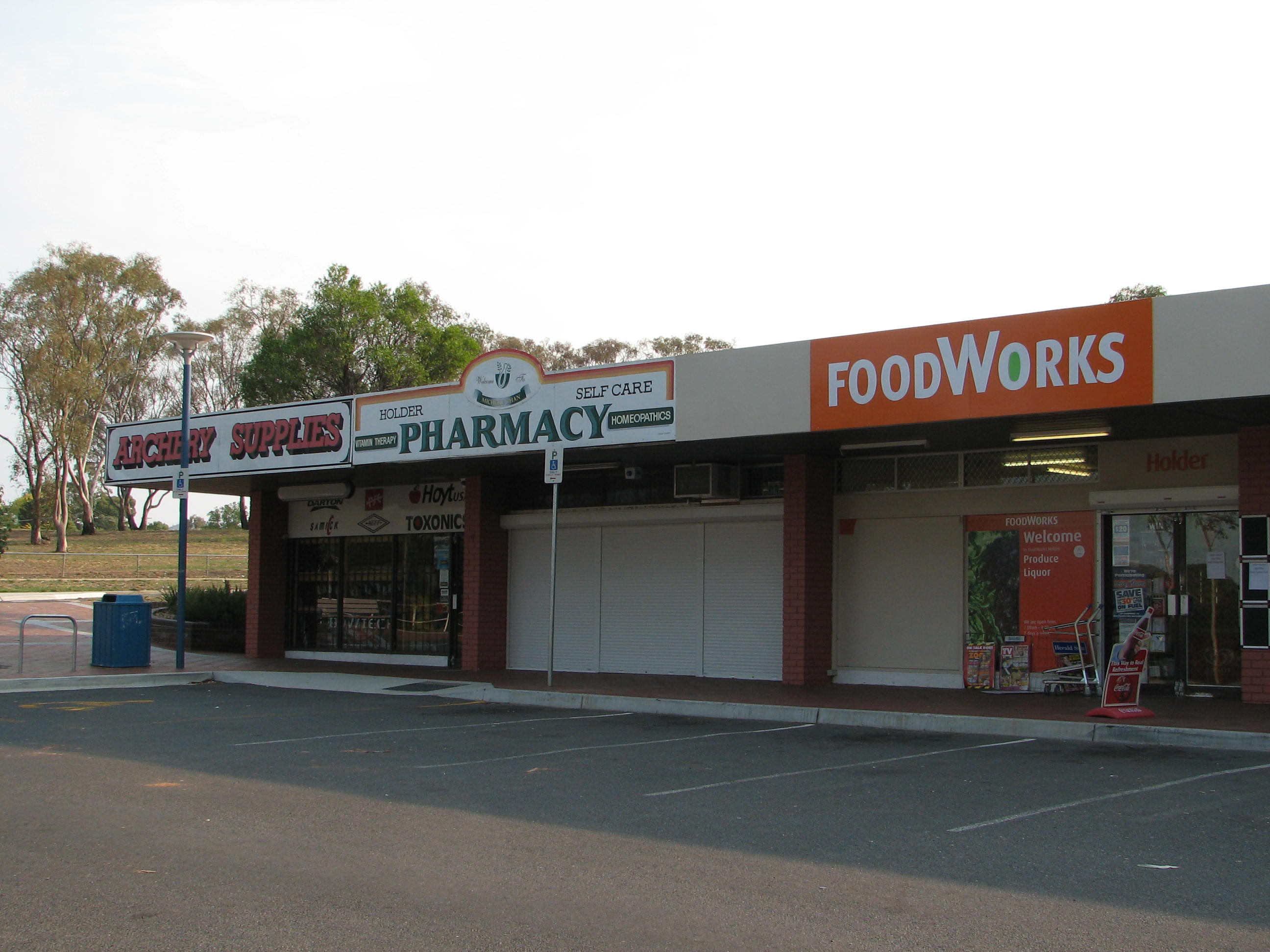
- Holder shops c. 2007

- Coordinates: 35°20′10″S 149°02′42″E
- Country: Australia
- State: Australian Capital Territory
- City: Canberra
- District: Weston Creek
- Location: 13 km (8.1 mi) SW of Canberra CBD; 16 km (9.9 mi) W of Queanbeyan; 102 km (63 mi) SW of Goulburn; 298 km (185 mi) SW of Sydney
- Established: 1970

Government
  - Territory electorate: Murrumbidgee
  - Federal division: Bean

Area
  - Total: 1.9 km^{2} (0.73 sq mi)
- Elevation: 592 m (1,942 ft)

Population
  - Total: 2,816 (SAL 2021)
- Postcode: 2611
Suburbs around Holder
Wright	Coombs	Weston
Duffy	Holder	Weston
Rivett	Rivett	Stirling

Holder (/hoʊldər/) is suburb of Canberra, Australian Capital Territory, Australia, located in the district of Weston Creek and is 13 km to the southwest of the Canberra city centre. It sits on the western edge of the Canberra suburbs, and overlooks no longer bare land towards Mount Stromlo to the west and Molonglo Valley to the north.

== History ==
The Weston homestead, one of the earliest homes in the district and the property after which the district of Weston Creek was named, was situated in present-day Holder prior to the commencement of residential development in the valley. It was located in what is now Calder Crescent. John and Ellen Fox lived at the Weston homestead from about the 1860s, and several of their nine children were born there. The Weston lease was later purchased by Rudolph and Eileen De Salis in 1937. Rudolph remained at Weston until he died in February 1957, aged 70. Members of the De Salis family continued to live at Weston up until the late-1960s.

Holder was announced by the Minister for the Interior, Mr Nixon, as the name of one of the eight new Weston Creek suburbs on 2 July 1970. It was named after Sir Frederick William Holder (1850–1909), Premier of South Australia between 1899 and 1901, and first Speaker of the Federal House of Representatives from 1901 to 1909. Consistent with Canberra's concept of having themed streets in each suburb, all streets in Holder are named after prominent Australian surveyors. The suburb is predominantly residential housing, with most houses constructed around 1970–1972.

Holder and neighbouring Duffy were the fifth and sixth suburbs to be developed in Weston Creek following Waramanga, Fisher, Weston and Rivett. Construction of homes mostly occurred during 1971 and 1972, and new bus services to Holder commenced in September 1971.

In the early 1970s, several problems were experienced with the construction of Dixon Drive, a main road running around the edge of Holder between Holder and Duffy. A section of roadway between Burrinjuck Crescent and Warragamba Avenue, formerly a natural watercourse, was closed due to water periodically flowing across the road during heavy rains. In December 1971 a 20 ft section of the road then caved in. Problems with water flooding across the road from the Weston Creek channel near Streeton Drive were also experienced, and a section of the road between Warragamba Avenue and Streeton Drive remained closed for nearly 18 months until remediation works with the channel were completed in late 1972. A section of the old Kambah Road between Cotter Road and Dixon Drive was used to give access to residents while remediation works were being carried out.

Holder originally had its own High School and Primary School, but both have since closed down – the Primary School in 1991, and the High School in 1993. The former high school is now used by community organisations such as Menslink. There are still two private schools in the suburb – St Jude's Catholic Primary and Canberra Montessori School – but the closest public school is now Duffy Primary School.

== 2003 bushfires ==
Holder was one of the hardest hit suburbs in the Canberra bushfire of 18 January 2003 when the fire came roaring out of the adjacent Stromlo Forest and across Dixon Drive into suburban housing. A total of 31 homes were destroyed in Holder, and 219 in adjacent Duffy. There was extensive damage to houses along Dixon Drive on the north of the suburb, but apart from occasional houses deeper into the suburb being ignited by floating embers, the fire generally did not penetrate into the suburb beyond one to two houses.

== Geology ==
The geologic structure under the suburb of Holder mostly comprises Deakin Volcanics green grey and purple rhyodacite. A band of pink and green rhyolitic intrusive porphyry is situated on the south and southwest sides.

== Churches ==
- St Jude (Catholic church)

== Government services ==
- Therapy ACT
