= Stirling, Australian Capital Territory =

Stirling
- Suburb
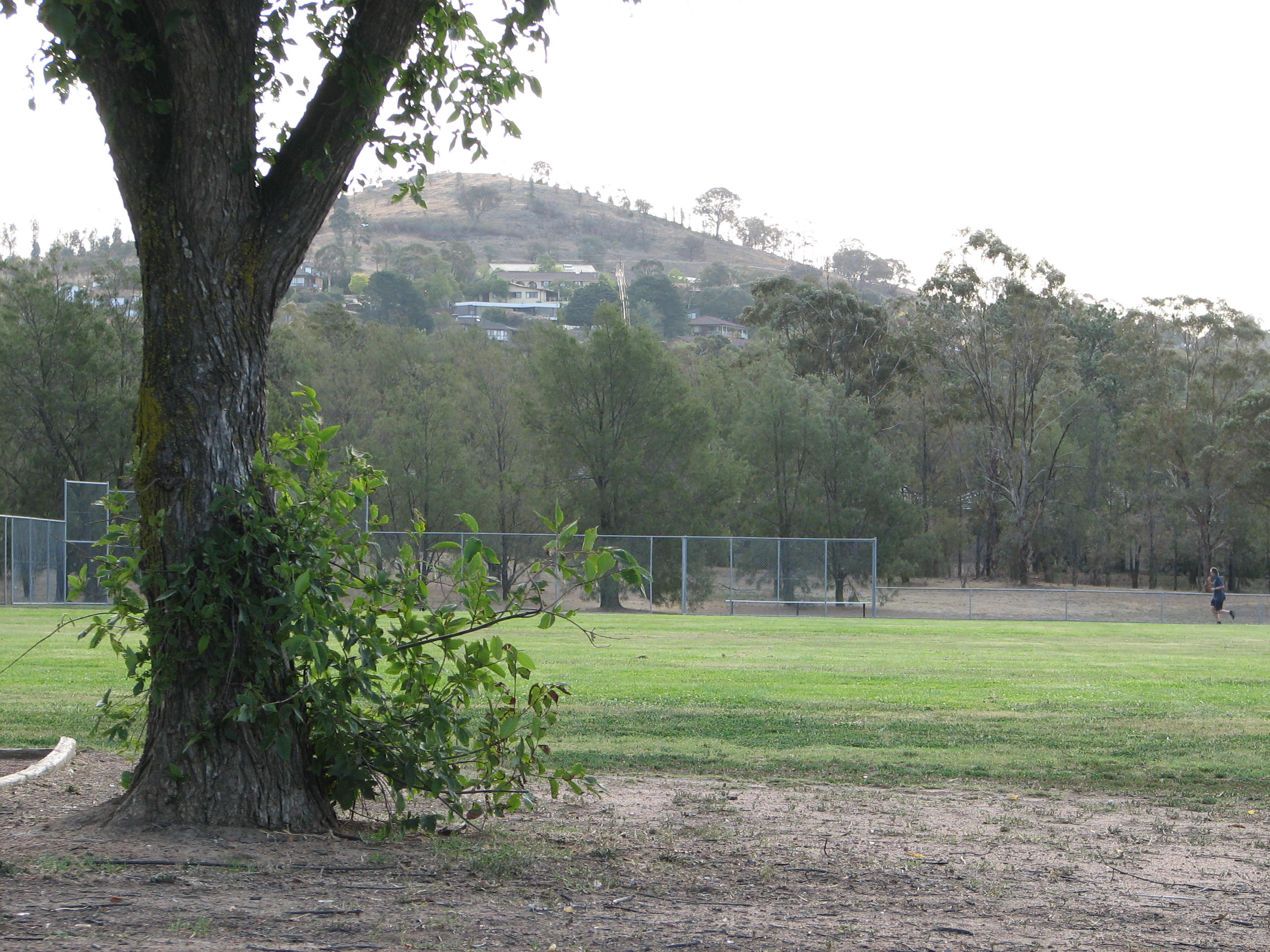
- Stirling playing fields

- Coordinates: 35°20′56″S 149°03′00″E
- Country: Australia
- State: Australian Capital Territory
- City: Canberra
- District: Weston Creek
- Location: 14 km (8.7 mi) SW of Canberra CBD; 18 km (11 mi) W of Queanbeyan; 104 km (65 mi) SW of Goulburn; 301 km (187 mi) SW of Sydney
- Established: 1970

Government
  - Territory electorate: Murrumbidgee
  - Federal division: Bean

Area
  - Total: 1.3 km^{2} (0.50 sq mi)
- Elevation: 603 m (1,978 ft)

Population
  - Total: 2,191 (SAL 2021)
- Postcode: 2611
Suburbs around Stirling
Holder	Weston	Weston
Rivett	Stirling	Waramanga
Chapman	Chapman	Fisher

Stirling is a suburb of Canberra, Australian Capital Territory, Australia. It is situated within the Weston Creek district.

The suburb is named after Sir James Stirling (1791–1865), the first Governor of Western Australia from 1829 to 1839, who established settlements at Perth and Fremantle in 1829. The suburb was gazetted in 1970. The streets of Stirling are named in honor of pioneers from Western Australia.

Stirling held the Weston Campus of the Canberra College, which was located on Fremantle Drive. The College closed down in the early 2000s. The site now holds the Hedley Beare Centre for Teaching and Learning.

== Geology ==
Deakin Volcanics red-purple and green grey rhyodacite with spherulitic texture cover most of Stirling except for Laidlaw Volcanics pale to dark grey tuff on the southernmost quarter. Quaternary Alluvium covers the southwest quarter.
