= Menslink =

- Formation: 2002
- Founder: Richard Shanahan
- Type: Not-for-profit organisation
- Legal status: Charity
- Headquarters: Holder, Australian Capital Territory
- Location: Australia
- Region served: Australian Capital Territory
- CEO: Ben Gathercole
- Website: menslink.org.au

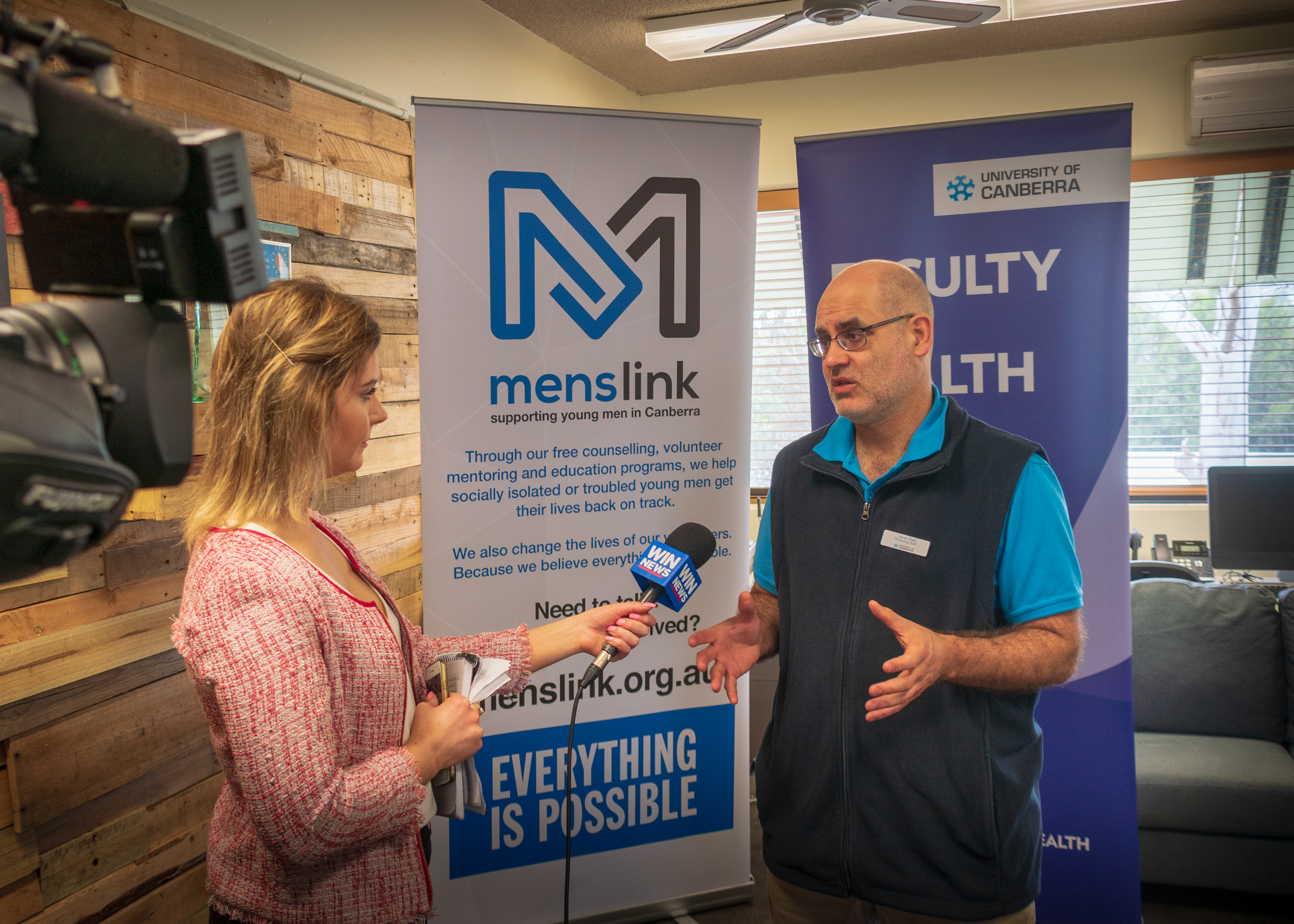
Dr. James Neill, University of Canberra, being interviewed at the official launch of a report about the long-term impact of Menslink counselling and mentoring programs

Menslink is a not-for-profit organisation which provides counselling, mentoring, and education about mental health and help-seeking for young men in the Australian Capital Territory (ACT). The Menslink offices are located in the suburb of Holder.

== History ==
Menslink was founded in 2002 by Richard Shanahan. The longest serving Menslink CEO was Martin Fisk OAM (2012-2023).

== Partnerships ==
Menslink have a longstanding partnership with the Canberra Raiders rugby league team. There is a similar program in the ACT for women, called Fearless Women.
