= Edward Weston (pastoralist) =

Captain George Edward Nicholas Weston was a former officer of the East India Company who arrived in Australia in 1825 and was granted land in the Weston Creek area in 1831, previously held by James Martin, who had built a house, grazed sheep and cattle and cleared and planted 20 acres (81,000 m^{2}). Technicalities hindered Martin's claim, and officials eventually preferred the wealthy, well-connected claim of Weston. Weston lived at Horsley, near Liverpool and was virtually an absent landlord, as the only interest he took in his property on the Molonglo River, was to take out a mortgage in February 1833, and sell it in August 1834 to Francis Mowatt. The district of Weston Creek in the Australian Capital Territory is named after him.

In 1831 he was granted 10 square kilometres of land in the Canberra district at a place described as Yarrow-lumla Plains.
