= Weston, Australian Capital Territory =

Weston
- Suburb
- Coordinates: 35°20′17″S 149°03′32″E
- Country: Australia
- State: Australian Capital Territory
- City: Canberra
- District: Weston Creek
- Location: 12 km (7.5 mi) SW of Canberra CBD; 19 km (12 mi) W of Queanbeyan; 102 km (63 mi) SW of Goulburn; 299 km (186 mi) SW of Sydney
- Established: 1970

Government
  - Territory electorate: Murrumbidgee
  - Federal division: Bean

Area
  - Total: 3.1 km^{2} (1.2 sq mi)
- Elevation: 575 m (1,886 ft)

Population
  - Total: 4,000 (2021 census)
  - Density: 1,290/km^{2} (3,300/sq mi)
- Postcode: 2611
Suburbs around Weston
Coombs	Stromlo Forest	Curtin
Holder	Weston	Lyons
Stirling, Rivett	Waramanga	Chifley

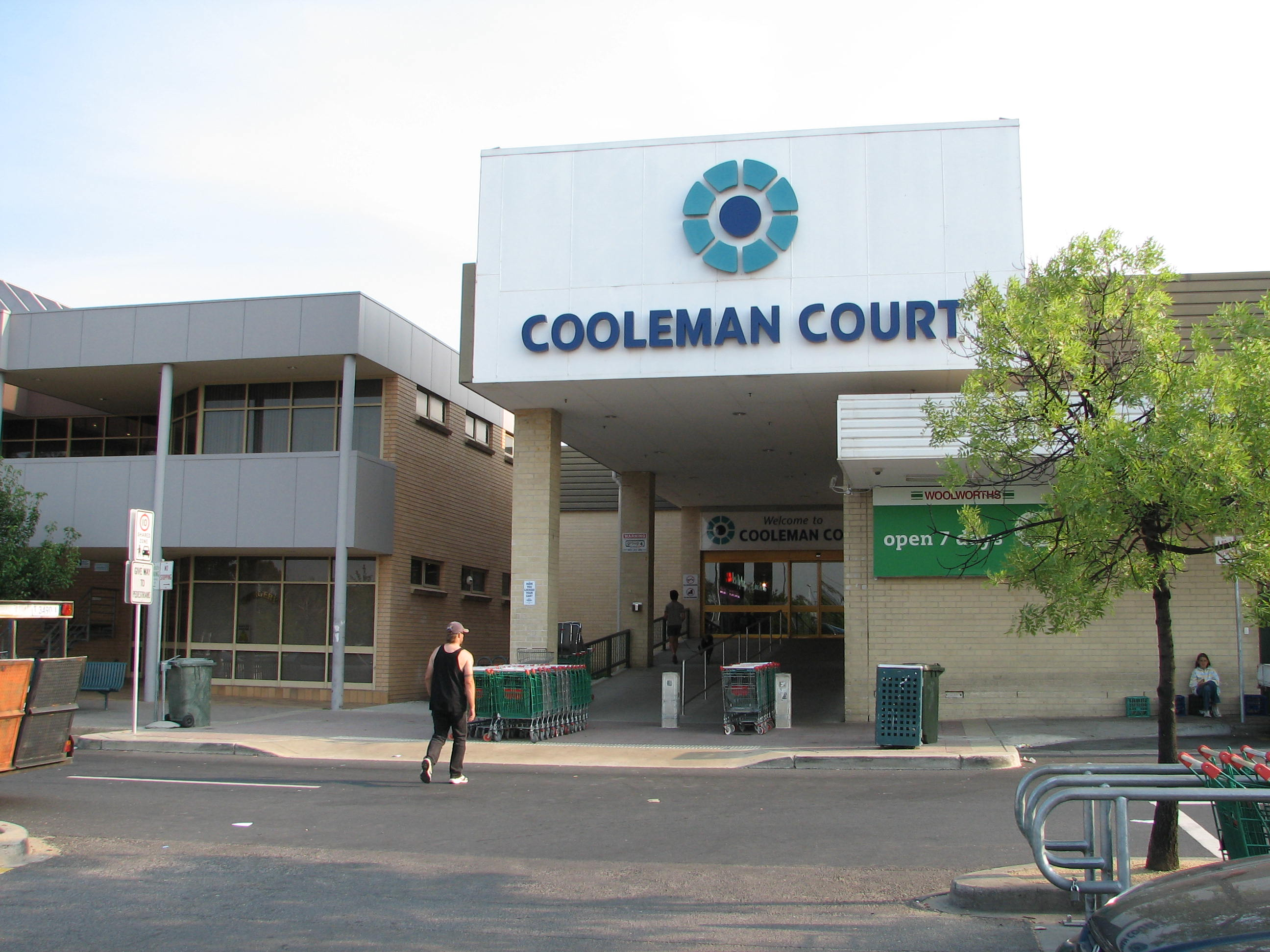
Cooleman Court

Weston is a suburb of Canberra, Australian Capital Territory, Australia. At the 2021 census, Weston had a population of 4,000 people.

Weston was named after a former homestead built in the area sometime around 1835. The Weston Creek grant was once held by Captain Edward Weston the Superintendent of the Hyde Park Barracks, Sydney. Streets in Weston are named after artists.

== Suburb amenities ==
=== Weston Creek Centre ===
Weston contains the central shopping area of the Weston Creek district, which includes the Cooleman Court shopping centre. Other facilities in the Weston Creek centre include a post office, petrol station, restaurants, clubs, real estate agents and many other specialty shops.

=== Churches ===
- St Peters (Anglican church)
- Baháʼí Faith
- Church of Christ (non-denominational)
- Presbyterian
- Uniting Church in Australia
- Sikh temple-Gurduara

=== Educational institutions ===
- Orana School
- Islamic School of Canberra

== Australian Defence College ==
The Australian Defence College's Centre for Defence and Strategic Studies (CDSS) and Australian Command and Staff College (ACSC) are both located at Weston Creek.

== Geology ==
Deakin Volcanics green grey and purple rhyodacite mostly covers Weston. The Deakin Volcanics green grey, purple and cream rhyolite can be seen between Parkinson St and Namatjira Drive and forms a large outcrop in the park to the east of Cooleman Court. A band of pink and green rhyolitic instrusive porphyry runs across Weston from west to east. It is fault uplifted on the southern side. Deakin Volcanics red-purple and green-grey rhyodacite with spherulitic texture is along Hindmarsh Drive on the southern border of the suburb.
