= Chapman, Australian Capital Territory =

Chapman
- Suburb
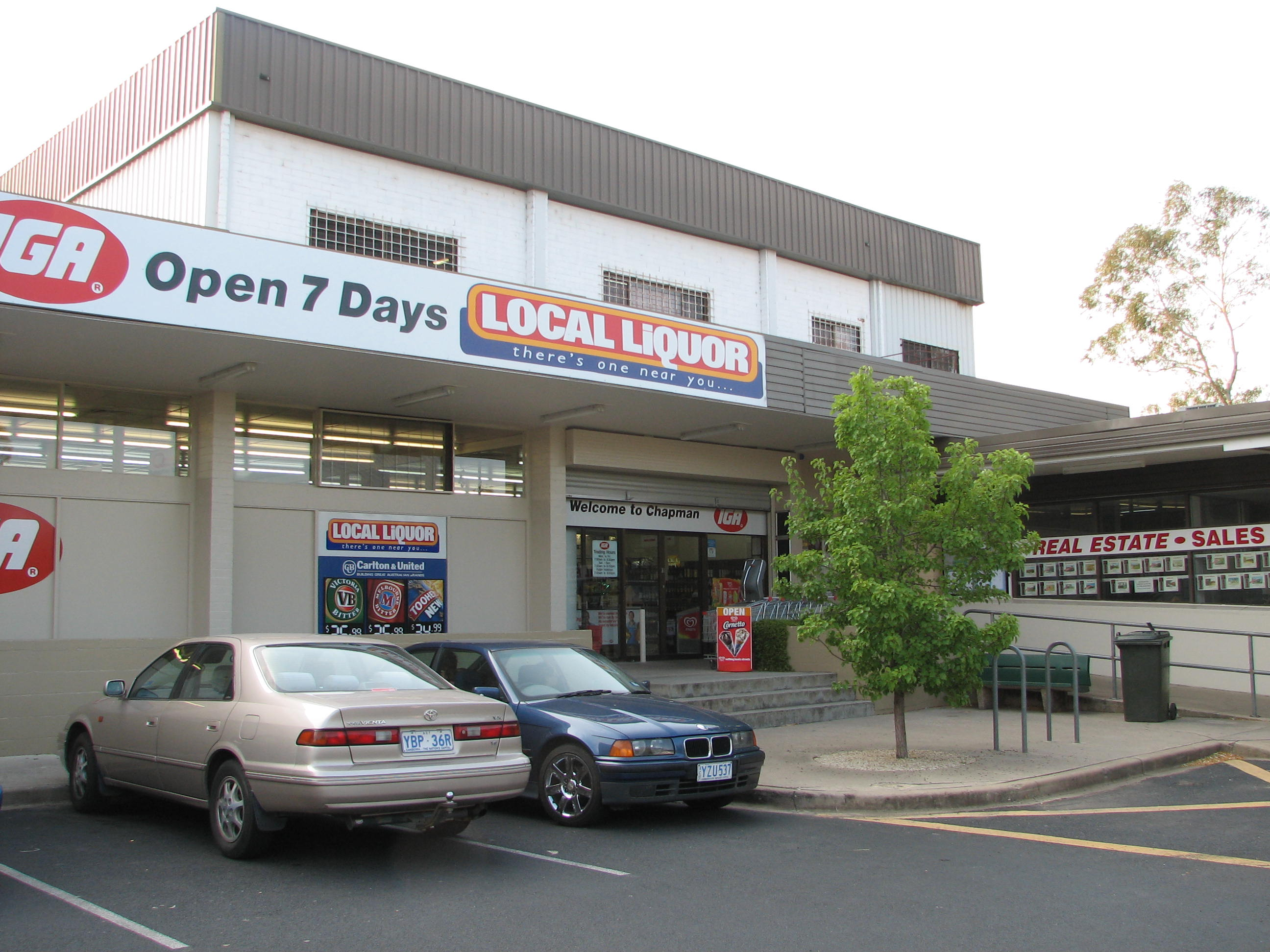
- Chapman shopping centre c. 2006

- Coordinates: 35°21′25″S 149°02′24″E
- Country: Australia
- State: Australian Capital Territory
- City: Canberra
- District: Weston Creek
- Location: 15 km (9.3 mi) SW of Canberra CBD; 20 km (12 mi) W of Queanbeyan; 103 km (64 mi) SW of Goulburn; 300 km (190 mi) SW of Sydney
- Established: 1970

Government
  - Territory electorate: Murrumbidgee
  - Federal division: Bean

Area
  - Total: 1.9 km^{2} (0.73 sq mi)
- Elevation: 631 m (2,070 ft)

Population
  - Total: 2,867 (SAL 2021)
- Postcode: 2611
Suburbs around Chapman
Rivett	Stirling	Waramanga
Cooleman Ridge	Chapman	Fisher
Cooleman Ridge	Mount Arawang	Kambah

Chapman is a suburb of Canberra, Australian Capital Territory, Australia, where many diplomats and some of the wealthier citizens of Canberra chose to take their residency. It is located in the Weston Creek area.

The suburb is named after Sir Austin Chapman (1864–1926), the member for Eden-Monaro from 1901 to 1926 who held portfolios in the Deakin and Bruce governments.

The theme for the street names in Chapman is the Australian film industry.

The local primary school in Chapman is the government run Chapman Primary School on Perry Drive. The school caters for students from Preschool to Year 6 and runs a before and after-school care program.

== Demographics ==
Chapman has a population of 2867 as of the 2021 census with 853 total families. 60.9% of Chapman's population is married with 14.2% being divorced, separated or widowed, while the remaining 39.3% of people never married.

75.7% of people living in Chapman were born in Australia with other countries of birth including 4.7% born in England, 1.2% born in South Africa and 1.2% born in Italy. Only 28 people or 1% of the population of Chapman identify as Indigenous Australian.

Chapman has a relatively high median weekly household income at $3111 which is significantly higher than the incomes of the median resident of the Australian Capital Territory and the rest of Australia.

Chapman has a large percentage of its population having achieved tertiary degrees with 49.5% of people having achieved a Bachelor degree or above. This is a significantly higher proportion than the rest of The Australian Capital Territory (42.9%) and the rest of Australia (26.3%).

== Geology ==
Laidlaw Volcanics pale to dark grey dacitic tuff covers most of Chapman. Shale, sandstone, ashstone and tuff is found near the west end of Rafferty Street. Quaternary alluvium covers up the eastern valley.
