= Molonglo =

Molonglo can refer to:

- Molonglo – a suburb in Canberra
- Molonglo Internment Camp and Molonglo Settlement - a WWI internment camp which then became a temporary suburb, located in what is now Fyshwick, Australian Capital Territory
- Molonglo River
- Molonglo Plains
- Molonglo electorate
- Molonglo Valley – District of Canberra
- Molonglo Observatory Synthesis Telescope
