= List of Canberra suburbs =

Map of part of the Australian Capital Territory, with labels in red font denoting some (but not all) suburbs

This is a list of suburbs in the Australian Capital Territory, in Australia.

Suburbs are listed according to the districts in which they are located. Town centres, Group Centres, or suburbs containing group centres, appear in bold. (Some group centres or town centres have names differing from those of the suburbs in which they are located, in which case there may be a separate article listed beside the suburbs.) The date of gazettal of the suburb is appended to its entry.

For a description of Australian Capital Territory's suburbs and urban hierarchy, including districts, town centres and suburbs, see Suburbs of the Australian Capital Territory

== Belconnen ==
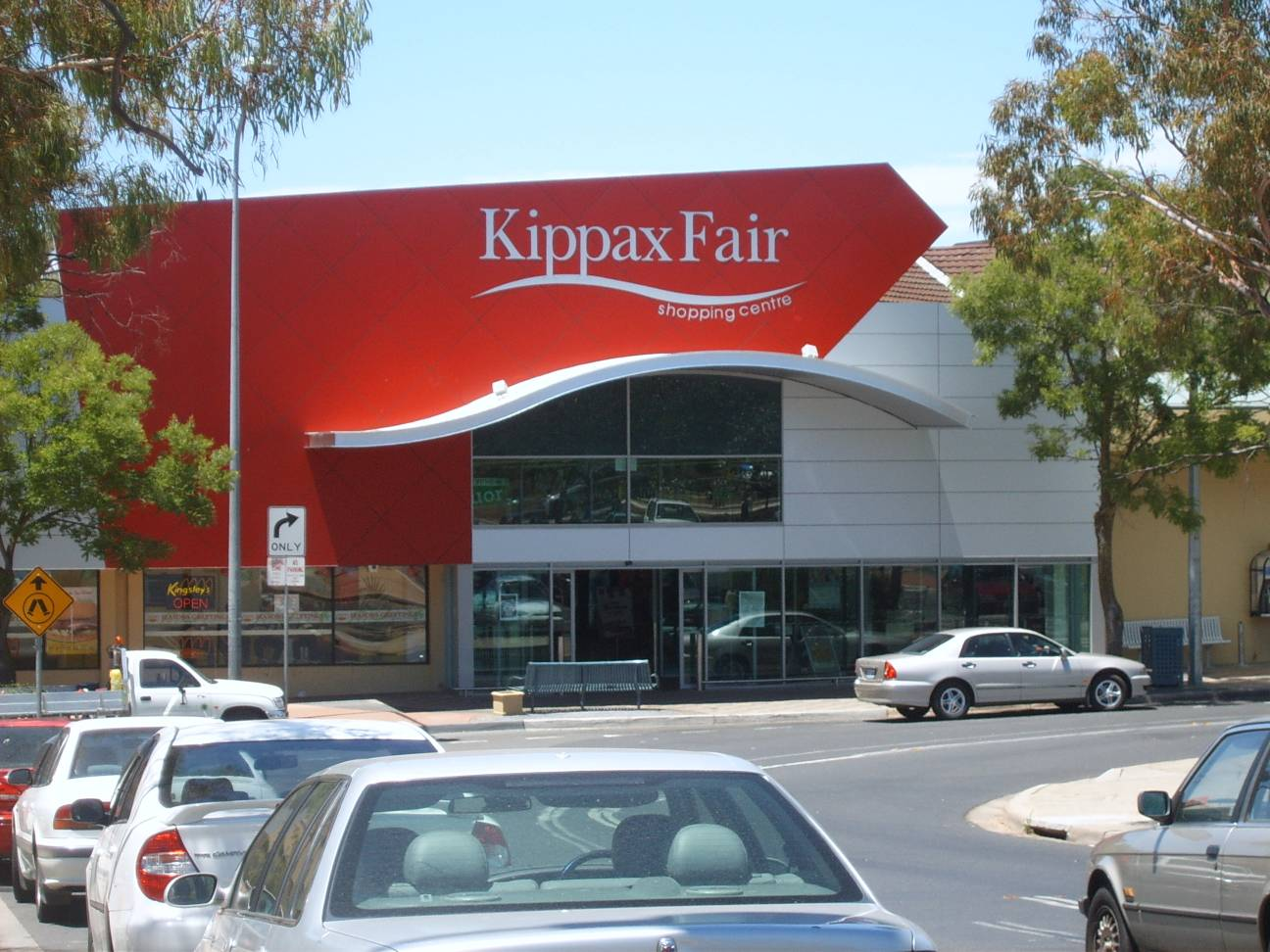
Kippax Fair, a suburban shopping centre located in the suburb of Holt

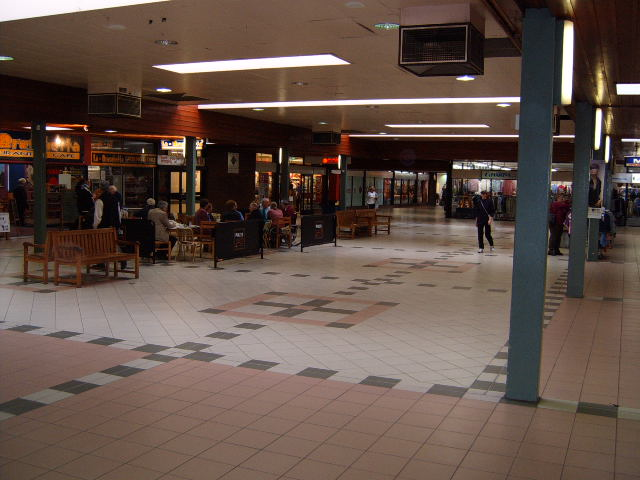
Jamison Plaza, located in the suburb of Macquarie, before its refurbishment

- Aranda 1967
- Belconnen – **Belconnen Town Centre** – Emu Ridge 1983
- Bruce 1968
- **Charnwood** 1973
- Cook 1968
- Dunlop
- Evatt 1972
- Florey 1975
- Flynn 1971
- Fraser 1974
- Giralang 1974
- **Hawker** 1972
- Higgins 1968
- Holt – **Kippax Fair Shopping Centre** 1970
- **Kaleen** 1974
- Latham 1971
- Lawson 2015
- Macgregor 1971
- Macnamara 2016
- Macquarie – **Jamison Centre** 1967
- McKellar 1974
- Melba 1972
- Page 1968
- Scullin 1968
- Spence 1972
- Strathnairn 2016
- Weetangera 1968

== Canberra Central ==
- Acton 1928
- Ainslie 1928
- Barton 1922
- Braddon 1928
- Campbell – Duntroon 1928
- Capital Hill 1913
- **City** (also referred to as Civic, the central business district of Canberra) 1928
- Deakin 1928
- Dickson – **Dickson Centre** 1928
- Downer 1960
- Forrest 1928
- Fyshwick 1918
- Griffith – **Manuka** 1927
- Hackett 1960
- **Kingston** – The Causeway
- Lyneham – North Lyneham 1928
- Narrabundah 1947
- O'Connor 1928
- Parkes 1922
- Red Hill 1928
- Reid 1928
- Russell
- Turner 1928
- Watson 1960
- Yarralumla 1928

== Gungahlin ==
^ denotes suburbs which have been planned, but not yet been opened or settled

- Amaroo 1991
- Bonner ~2005
- Casey 2010
- Crace 2009
- Forde 2006
- Franklin 2007
- Gungahlin – **Gungahlin Town Centre** 1998
- Harrison 2006
- Jacka 2013
- Kenny
- Kinlyside ^
- Mitchell
- Moncrieff ~2005
- Ngunnawal 1991
- Nicholls 1994
- Palmerston 1991
- Taylor 2017
- Throsby 2005

== Jerrabomberra ==
- Beard
- Hume
- Oaks Estate 1984
- Symonston

== Majura ==
- Canberra Airport
- Pialligo 1982

== Molonglo Valley ==
Planned suburbs as of 18 June 2012

^ denotes suburbs which have been planned, but not yet been opened or settled

- Bandler ^
- Coombs
- Denman Prospect
- Molonglo ^
- Sulman ^
- Whitlam
- Wright

== Tuggeranong ==
- Banks 1987
- Bonython 1986
- **Calwell** 1975
- **Chisholm** 1975
- Conder
- Fadden 1975
- Gilmore 1975
- Gordon 1987
- Gowrie
- Greenway – **Tuggeranong Town Centre** 1986
- Isabella Plains 1975
- Kambah – **Kambah Village Centre** 1974
- Macarthur 1982
- Monash 1975
- Oxley 1982
- Richardson 1975
- Theodore 1975
- Wanniassa – **Erindale Centre** 1974

== Weston Creek ==
- Chapman
- Duffy 1970
- Fisher
- Holder 1970
- Rivett
- Stirling 1970
- Waramanga
- Weston – **Weston Creek Centre**

== Woden Valley ==
- Chifley
- Curtin – **Curtin Centre** 1962
- Farrer
- Garran 1966
- Hughes 1962
- Isaacs 1966
- Lyons
- Mawson – **Southlands Centre** 1966
- O'Malley 1973
- Pearce
- Phillip – **Woden Town Centre** – Swinger Hill 1966
- Torrens 1966

== Former suburbs ==
In 1927 the provisional suburbs of the Australian Capital Territory were renamed to honour the leaders of Federation, and to retain the earlier names in the district; with the exception of Mugga (the proposed renaming of Red Hill) the new names were gazetted in 1928.

- Ainslie was renamed Braddon
- South Ainslie was renamed Reid
- North Ainslie was renamed Ainslie
- Blandfordia was renamed Forrest
- Causeway became part of Kingston
- Eastlake was renamed Kingston
- Manuka and South Blandfordia were combined and renamed Griffith
- Telopea Park was renamed Barton
- Westridge was renamed Yarralumla

== Other ==
- Hall, District of Hall (technically a separate town)
- Harman, District of Jerrabomberra (navy base)
- Pierces Creek (former forestry settlement)
- Tharwa, District of Paddys River (technically a separate town)
- Uriarra (former forestry settlement)
- Williamsdale, small town in the district of Tuggeranong
