= Evelyn Scott =

Evelyn Scott may refer to:

- Evelyn Scott (activist) (1935 – 2017), Australian educator and activist
- Evelyn Scott (writer) (1893–1963), American novelist, playwright and poet
- Evelyn Scott (actress) (1915–2002), American actress

== See also ==
- Evelyn Scott School
