= Sulman, Australian Capital Territory =

New Canberra suburb

Sulman
- Suburb
- Coordinates: 35°16′37″S 149°04′11″E
- Country: Australia
- State: Australian Capital Territory
- District: Molonglo Valley
- Established: 2024

Sulman is a suburb of the Molonglo Valley, ACT. It was officially gazetted in September 2024 and is named after Sir John Sulman, a prominent Australian architect and town planner. Sulman is located in the Molonglo Valley district, one of the newest regions under development in the ACT.

== Location ==
Sulman is situated in the Molonglo Valley, a rapidly growing area west of Canberra's city centre. It shares its district with other suburbs such as Denman Prospect, Coombs, and the newly gazetted suburb of Bandler.

== History ==
The suburb was named to commemorate Sir John Sulman's contributions to architecture and urban planning in Australia. The gazettal of Sulman and Bandler reflects ongoing development in the Molonglo Valley region to accommodate Canberra's expanding population.

== Features ==
The suburb is planned to include residential areas, parks, and community facilities, consistent with the sustainable urban design principles guiding development in the Molonglo Valley.

== Governance ==
Sulman is part of the Molonglo Valley district and falls within the jurisdiction of the ACT Legislative Assembly. It is also included in federal electoral divisions as designated for the ACT.

== See also ==
- List of Canberra suburbs
- John Sulman
