= Terry Snow =

Australian businessman and philanthropist (1943–2024)

Terry Snow AM
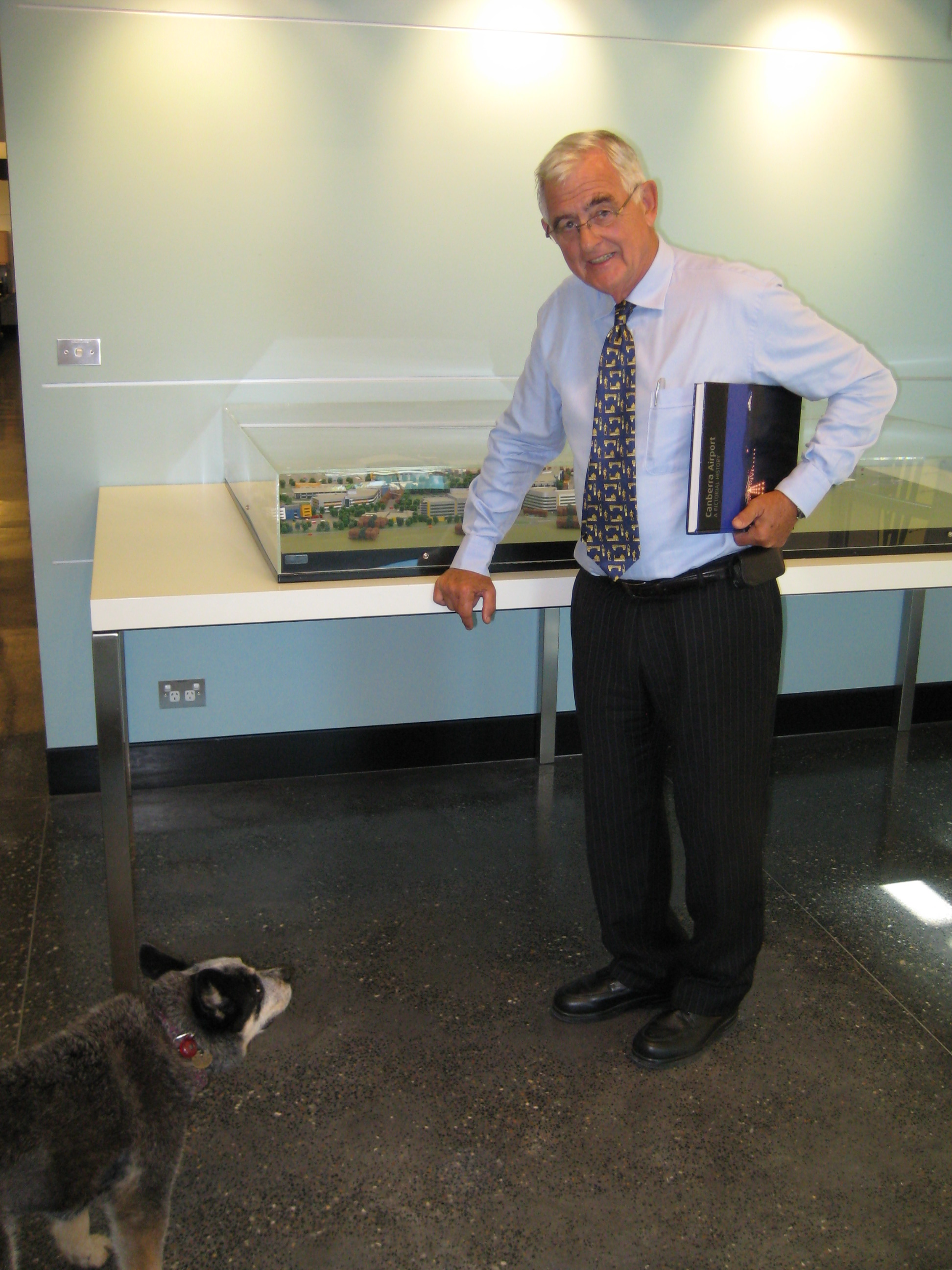
- Snow in 2011
- Born: Terrence Mark Snow; 1943; Canberra, Australian Capital Territory, Australia
- Died: 3 August 2024 (aged 80)
- Education: Canberra Grammar School
- Occupations: Businessman; entrepreneur; philanthropist
- Known for: Redevelopment of Canberra International Airport and associated business parks
- Spouse: Ginette Snow
- Children: 4

Terrence Mark Snow AM (1943 – 3 August 2024) was an Australian businessman and philanthropist based in Canberra in the Australian Capital Territory.

== Background ==
Terry Snow was the grandson of Canberra's first general store owner. His parents owned a hotel in Queanbeyan and the young Snow attended Canberra Grammar School, initially as a boarder. He subsequently supported the school through a number of significant philanthropic gifts. Snow died on 3 August 2024, at the age of 80.

== Career ==
=== Commercial development ===
Snow was Executive Chairman of the Capital Airport Group, the company which owns the lease for the land which contains Canberra Airport and Brindabella Business Park. Snow's Capital Airport Group acquired the 99-year lease from the Australian Government in 1998 for $65 million. The site includes Fairbairn Business Park, formerly a Royal Australian Air Force base, as well as the Majura Business Park and Majura Park Shopping Centre. Snow was responsible for a $250 million development of a new terminal for Canberra Airport including an “extravagant” international interior design-winning terminal. Singapore Airlines and Qatar Airways were the first two international air carriers to Canberra; that arrived at Canberra international Airport in 2017 and 2018 respectively.

Snow developed Brindabella Business Park. One of these landmark buildings is 8 Brindabella Circuit, which was awarded five stars under the Green Star rating system of the Green Building Council of Australia – the first and highest rating awarded in Australia at the time. Snow's attempt to develop land around the Canberra Airport was described by Patrick Troy as controversial. Specific criticisms include that it removes jobs from Civic, diminishes Canberra's town centre, and causes unnecessary congestion on roads originally designed exclusively for airport traffic. The development of Brindabella Business Park attracted international corporates including KPMG, Deloitte and Raytheon as well as the Department of Home Affairs and has been recognised as an emerging aerotropolis that has helped to grow the Canberra workforce.

Snow’s nearby Majura Park Shopping Centre attracted international retailers Costco, Aldi and Ikea, with nationwide retailers Bunnings, Woolworths and Dan Murphy's.

Capital Property Group also developed Constitution Place, a commercial and hospitality complex adjacent to the Canberra Theatre and the Australian Capital Territory Legislative Assembly in Canberra's central business district, which houses a five-storey government office building and a 12-level commercial building that is Canberra’s first WELL-rated building with a hotel and dining spaces.

In 2017, Snow opened Willinga Park, an award-winning, 810-hectare (2,000-acre), equine facility in Bawley Point. Willinga Park was developed to include an equestrian centre with three Olympic-sized dressage arenas, showjumping fields and a campdrafting arena. In 2018, Snow sponsored the largest campdrafting purse in Australian history at the World Championship Gold Buckle Campdraft centre. Pete Comiskey, a Queensland campdrafting rider, won the $100,000 purse after only four rounds lasting four minutes. Willinga Park also includes native gardens and a sculpture walk. It has been referred to as “Jurassic Park with horses.” In June 2018, it was announced that Sculpture on the Clyde, an outdoor art exhibition usually held on the Clyde River in Batemans Bay would be moved to Willinga Park to avoid being cancelled after the Eurobodalla Shire Council and event organisers were unable to come to an agreement on event logistics, insurance and security. During the 2019–20 Australian bushfire season, Willinga Park and its well constructed and defended fire breaks were credited as providing a much-needed fire break that saved Bawley Point from destructive fires.

=== Residential development ===
Snow was also the owner of Capital Property Group and Capital Estate Developments which is responsible for the development of Denman Prospect, a master-planned community in the Molonglo Valley and the first Australian suburb to have a minimum requirement for solar power generation on every home. It is also the first suburb in Australia to commit to the Homes for Homes initiative which donates 0.1 per cent of the sale price of all properties to projects that address the shortage of social and affordable housing in the ACT.

== Personal life ==
Snow was married to Ginette, and they had four children. Their son Stephen was managing director of Capital Airport Group and Canberra Airport.

Snow owned a large equestrian property, Willinga Park, near Bawley Point in New South Wales. In December 2019 and January 2020, massive fires swept through the area and Snow's "intricate fire plan [is] credited as part of the reason the nearby coastal town of Bawley Point escaped annihilation in the firestorm that swept through the region."

=== Net worth ===
In 2013, Snow was ranked by Forbes as Australia's 39th richest person, with a net worth of US$755 million. By 2019, his wealth was estimated by Forbes Asia at US$1.2 billion. Following Snow's death in 2024, it was reported that approximately half of his A$4.10 billion estate was transferred to his wife, Ginette; and that the remainder of his estate's wealth was to be put into a charitable trust.

Year	Financial Review Rich List		Forbes Australia's 50 Richest	
Year	Rank	Net worth (A$)	Rank	Net worth (US$)
2017		$1.00 billion	n/a	not listed
2018	52	$1.46 billion ▲		
2019	43 ▲	$1.86 billion ▲	36 ▲	$1.20 billion ▲
2020	27 ▲	$3.19 billion ▲		
2021	42 ▼	$2.53 billion ▼		
2022	29 ▲	$3.60 billion ▲		
2023	28 ▲	$3.90 billion ▲		
2024		$4.10 billion ▲		

Legend
Icon	Description
Steady	Has not changed from the previous year
▲	Has increased from the previous year
▼	Has decreased from the previous year

=== Philanthropy ===
Along with his brother, George, Snow established the Snow Foundation in 1991. As of 2016, the Foundation held over A$40 million in net assets, with a focus on supporting regional charities and organisations helping needy people. In 2016 Snow predicted that in the next 10–15 years, the Snow Foundation endowment will “be over $100 million and that will let us do three times what we're doing now".

In 2005 he published the "Living City" proposal for the redevelopment of Canberra. This caused some controversy, especially after the proposal's rebuff by the ACT Government and combined with his provocative assertion that Canberra is a "dead-set boring" city that had been "going backwards since self-government".

In 2017, the Australian National Portrait Gallery commissioned Snow's portrait in recognition of the contribution he has made to the growth of Canberra and his work as a philanthropist. In a media interview, Snow said he was proud to call Canberra home: "I was born in Canberra, that's quite something for someone who is 74. I love the place; it's been a big part of my life, a very happy life. I had a wonderful time growing up in Canberra, raising a family here, developing a business career. Some people say Canberra is an economic backwater but I've proven that wrong. It's a great little city."

The Snow family is a strong supporter of, and has provided in-kind contributors to, the Marriage Equality lobby group Australians for Equality, of which his son Tom was chair until November 2023.

Snow held a commercial pilot licence for fixed wing aircraft and rotary wing aircraft and had a command instrument rating.

Through a gift of A$8 million in 2013 to Canberra Grammar School, he endowed The Snow Centre for Education in the Asian Century to focus on the advancement of Asian Studies at primary and secondary school levels. The centre was established in 2015 and aims to provide “world-class facilities for the study of Asian languages, history and culture.” Canberra Grammar School also offers The Terry Snow Scholarship for Global Studies for a student who demonstrates excellent academic potential and a commitment to a global outlook who wishes to take the International Baccalaureate Diploma Programme. In October 2019 Snow donated A$20 million to Canberra Grammar School with the plan to rebuild the school's breezeway and library and create a centre for music excellence. The gift was reported as the largest philanthropic gift to an Australian school.

=== Honours and awards ===
Snow was appointed a Member of the Order of Australia (AM) in the 2006 Australia Day Honours for service to the building and construction industry, particularly the redevelopment of the Canberra International Airport precinct, and to the community through support for a range of charitable organisations.
