= Pierces Creek =

Pierces Creek may refer to:

- Pierces Creek, Queensland, a town in Queensland, Australia
- Pierces Creek, Australian Capital Territory, a former forestry settlement on the outskirts of Canberra
