= Bandler, Australian Capital Territory =

Suburb of Canberra, the capital of Australia

Bandler
- Suburb
- Coordinates: 35°16′40″S 149°03′10″E
- Country: Australia
- State: Australian Capital Territory
- City: Canberra
- Established: 2024

Government
  - Territory electorate: Murrumbidgee
  - Federal division: Bean
Suburbs around Bandler
		Sulman
Whitlam	Bandler	Sulman
Molonglo	Molonglo River

Bandler is a suburb of Canberra located in the Molonglo Valley district of the Australian Capital Territory. It was officially gazetted in September 2024 and is named after Faith Bandler, a prominent Indigenous rights activist. Street names in Bandler will adopt a theme around Australian social and cultural life. The suburb is located on hilly terrain north of the Molonglo River, east of John Gorton Drive and south of William Hovell Drive, adjacent to the suburb of Whitlam. The suburb masterplan describes a mixed-density neighbourhood, however as of 2025 no land releases have occurred and the suburb remains undeveloped.

== See also ==
- List of Canberra suburbs
- Faith Bandler
