= Whitlam, Australian Capital Territory =

Whitlam
- Suburb
- Coordinates: 35.275°S 149.037°E
- Country: Australia
- State: Australian Capital Territory
- City: Canberra
- District: Molonglo Valley
- Location: 12 km (7.5 mi) W of Canberra CBD; 26 km (16 mi) WNW of Queanbeyan; 100 km (62 mi) SW of Goulburn; 297 km (185 mi) SW of Sydney

Government
  - Territory electorate: Murrumbidgee
  - Federal division: Bean
- Elevation: 588 m (1,929 ft)

Population
  - Total: 879 (2024)
- Time zone: UTC10
- Postcode: 2611
Suburbs around Whitlam
Whitlam	Bandler
Denman Prospect	Molonglo

Whitlam is a suburb in the Molonglo Valley, Australian Capital Territory. The suburb is named after former prime minister Gough Whitlam. Many Canberra suburbs are named after prime ministers or other politicians, but only at least a year post death. The ACT government waited a year before announcing a suburb named Whitlam. Whitlam is the northernmost suburb in the Molonglo Valley district, positioned to the north of Denman Prospect.

The ACT government plans to release 500 residential dwelling lots in 2018–19, 600 in 2019–20 and another 500 in 2020–21.

Whitlam is a cat containment area, meaning that pet cats are not permitted to roam freely outside householder's yards.

== Geography ==
The Molonglo River forms the southern border of Whitlam. The eastern edge is marked by the Coppins Crossing Road. The lowest point at the western corner is about 500 meters above sea level. The higher parts are to the north, which is the southern slopes of The Pinnacle.

Whitlam is cut in half by the inactive Winslade Fault. The fault runs in a southwest-northeast direction and is marked by quartz outcrops. Southeast of the fault the surface rock is tuff from the Mount Painter Volcanics of late Wenlock age. Northwest of the fault, the rocks are rhyodacite from the Walker Volcanics. Deep Creek flowing to the southwest roughly in line with the Winslade Fault drains most of the suburb.
