= Molonglo River =

River in Australia

Molonglo
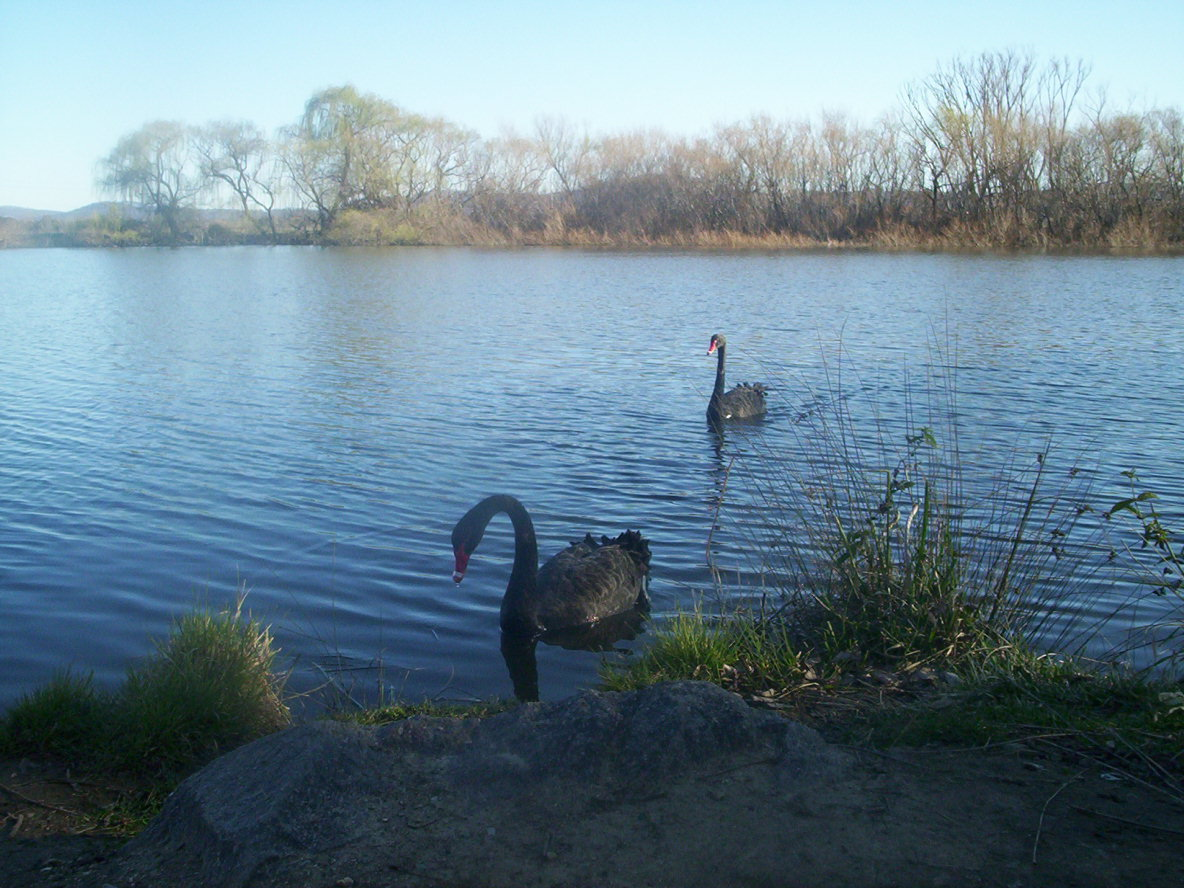
- Black swans on the Molonglo River

- Location of the Molonglo River mouth in the ACT
- Etymology: Aboriginal: "like the sound of thunder"
- Native name: Yeal-am-bid-gie

Location
- Country: Australia
- State/Territory: New South Wales; Australian Capital Territory
- Regions: South Eastern Highlands (IBRA); Monaro; Capital Country
- Districts: Palerang; Queanbeyan
- City: Queanbeyan

Physical characteristics
- Source: Tinderry Range, Great Dividing Range
  - location: near Captains Flat
  - coordinates: 35°40′5″S 149°29′50″E
  - elevation: 1,130 m (3,710 ft)
- Mouth: confluence with the Murrumbidgee River
  - location: near Uriarra Crossing
  - coordinates: 35°14′30″S 148°58′4″E
  - elevation: 440 m (1,440 ft)
- Length: 115 km (71 mi)
- Basin size: 198,900 km^{2} (76,800 sq mi)

Basin features
- River system: Murrumbidgee River, Murray–Darling basin
- Tributaries
  - left: Queanbeyan River, Jerrabomberra Creek
  - right: Sullivans Creek
- Nature reserves: Molonglo Gorge Recreation Reserve, Jerrabomberra Wetlands, Lower Molonglo Nature Reserve

The Molonglo River is a perennial river that is part of the Murrumbidgee catchment within the Murray–Darling basin. It is located in the Monaro and Capital Country regions of New South Wales and the Australian Capital Territory, in Australia.

== Location and features ==
The river rises on the western side of the Great Dividing Range, in Tallaganda State Forest at 1,130 metres (3,710 ft) and flows generally from south to north before turning north-west, through Carwoola and the outskirts of Queanbeyan, where it has confluence with its major tributary, the Queanbeyan River, and then continues through Canberra, where it has been dammed by the Scrivener Dam to form Lake Burley Griffin. The river then flows to its confluence with the Murrumbidgee River, near Uriarra Crossing. Over its 115 kilometres (71 mi) course, the Molonglo River alternates several times between long broad floodplains and narrow rocky gorges. One of the floodplains is called the Molonglo Plain.

From source to mouth, the river is traversed by the Captains Flat Road at Captains Flat, Briars-Sharrow Road in Carwoola, the Kings Highway between Queanbeyan and Bungendore, the Yass Road, north of Queanbeyan, the Monaro Highway at Pialligo, the Commonwealth and Kings Avenues as Lake Burley Griffin between Parkes and Acton, Lady Denman Drive at Scrivener Dam, and the Tuggeranong Parkway south of the Glenloch Interchange.

== Etymology ==
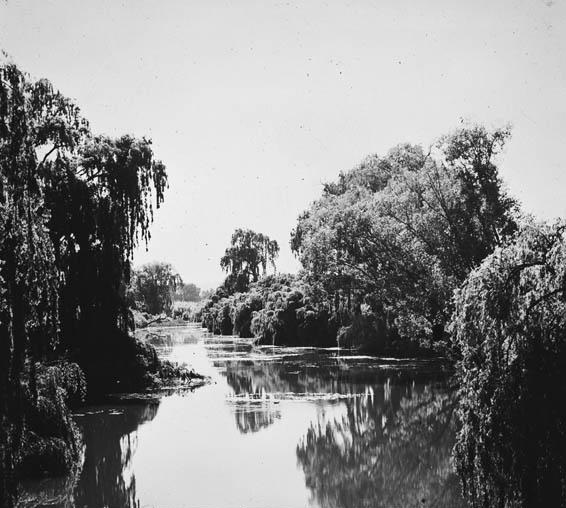
Molonglo River at Acton in 1920

The river's name was recorded as the "Yeal-am-bid-gie" in 1820 by the explorer Charles Throsby. This was probably the collective local Moolinggolah name for the river. (The suffix "bidgee" was common in Aboriginal languages for rivers in the Canberra area and presumably means "water" or "river".) The Moolinggolah people of the district around Captains Flat probably gave the Molonglo its name. Where the river flowed through what is now Canberra, it was probably known after the Ngambri people, transcribed as Kembury, Canberry, and other transcription variations. The word molongolo is derived from an Aboriginal word meaning "like the sound of thunder".

== History ==
The first name given to the River by Westerners was Limestone River, Subsequently, in the early years of European settlement both the Molonglo and the Queanbeyan were known as the "Fish River" for the abundance of native fish in them. The Molonglo was renowned as a beautiful river with excellent fishing for native Murray cod, Macquarie perch and silver perch. This abundance of native fish did not last. Upon commencement of mining operations at Captains Flat (and contrary to NSW Government assurances), mine tailings continually severely polluted the river, including several mass tailings collapses into the river between the 1930s and 1950s, eradicating all native fish and most other aquatic life downstream from the site. Despite government funded rehabilitation programs in 1976, some toxic leachates still enter the river from the Captain's Flat mine site.

Consequently, when Lake Burley Griffin was built upon the Molonglo and filled in 1964, the waters were devoid of native fish. Restocking commenced in the 1970s and continued through 1980s have re-established Murray cod and golden perch in the lake and a short stretch of river upstream. A large stretch of the Molonglo still holds nothing but introduced fish species and is still waiting for the native fish species to be re-established by stockings.

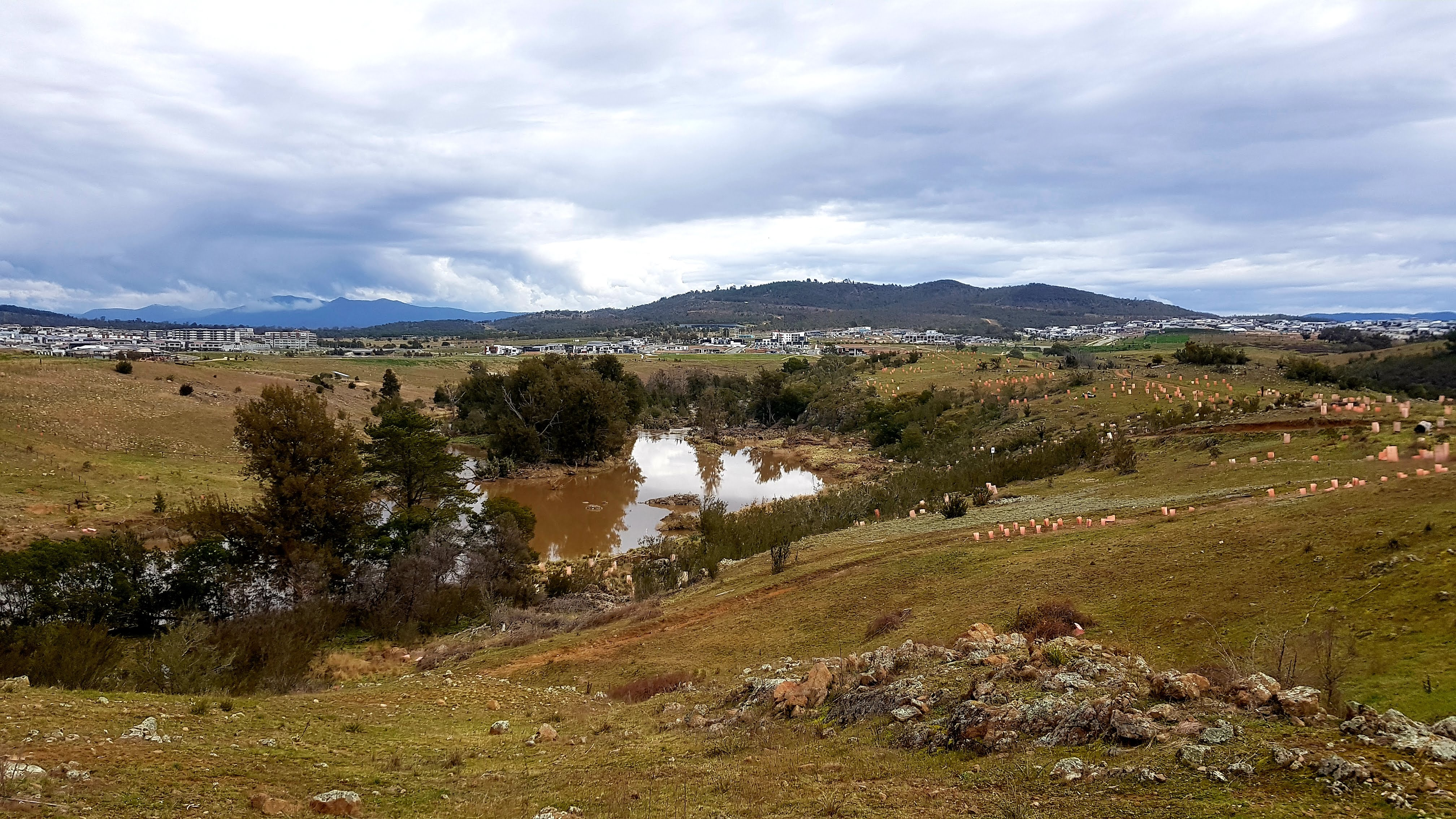
View of the Molonglo River from Barrer Circuit Trailhead. The suburbs of Coombs, Wright and Denman Prospect are viewable (L to R) against the backdrop of Mount Stromlo and the Tidbinbilla mountain range.

Significant natural restoration work has been undertaken downstream of Scrivener Dam in conjunction with the housing development in the Molonglo Valley during the 2010s. In February 2024, construction began on a 200-metre-long bridge connecting Whitlam with the Molonglo Valley. It is expected to be completed in December 2025.

== See also ==
- History of Lake Burley Griffin
- List of rivers of Australia
- London Bridge (New South Wales)
- Rivers of New South Wales
- Scott's Crossing Road
