= Snow Foundation =

Australian charity

The Snow Foundation
- Type: Non-profit organisation
- Industry: Social welfare
- Founded: 1991
- Headquarters: Canberra, Australia
- Key people: Terry Snow and George Snow (founders)
- Products: The Snow Foundation was set up to assist those in need in the Canberra community whose needs are not covered by government sources.
- Revenue: 52,784,843 Australian dollar (2023)
- Total assets: 183,088,273 Australian dollar (2023)
- Number of employees: 9 (2023)
- Website: www.snowfoundation.org.au

The Snow Foundation is a non-profit organisation operating in Canberra. It was established to assist those in need in the Canberra community whose needs are not covered by government sources.

== History ==
The Snow Foundation is a response to the long association the Snow family has had with the Canberra region, dating back to 1926 when E.R. Snow, the founders' grandfather, came to Canberra to establish the Capital's first general store.

The foundation is the creation of brothers Terry and George Snow who set it up in 1991 with the aim of helping those individuals and organisations that freely gave their time to help the less fortunate live fulfilling lives. Starting with an initial contribution of $1 million, the Foundation has provided financial help to a diverse range of organisations and individuals throughout Canberra and the surrounding region. The foundation now has over $100 million in capital

As of June 2026, the Snow Foundation has helped more than 550 different organisations and 1062 individuals, providing over $110 million in funding .

== Description ==
As of 2020, the main areas for which the Snow Foundation provides services are social welfare (including homelessness and domestic violence), lack of education or employment, including future job opportunities, and health for Indigenous Australians as well as aged care.

== Activities ==
The Snow Foundation supported a feature film focused on domestic violence, titled Life Could Be a Dream, released in Australia in 2026.
