= London Bridge (New South Wales) =

Cave in New South Wales, Australia

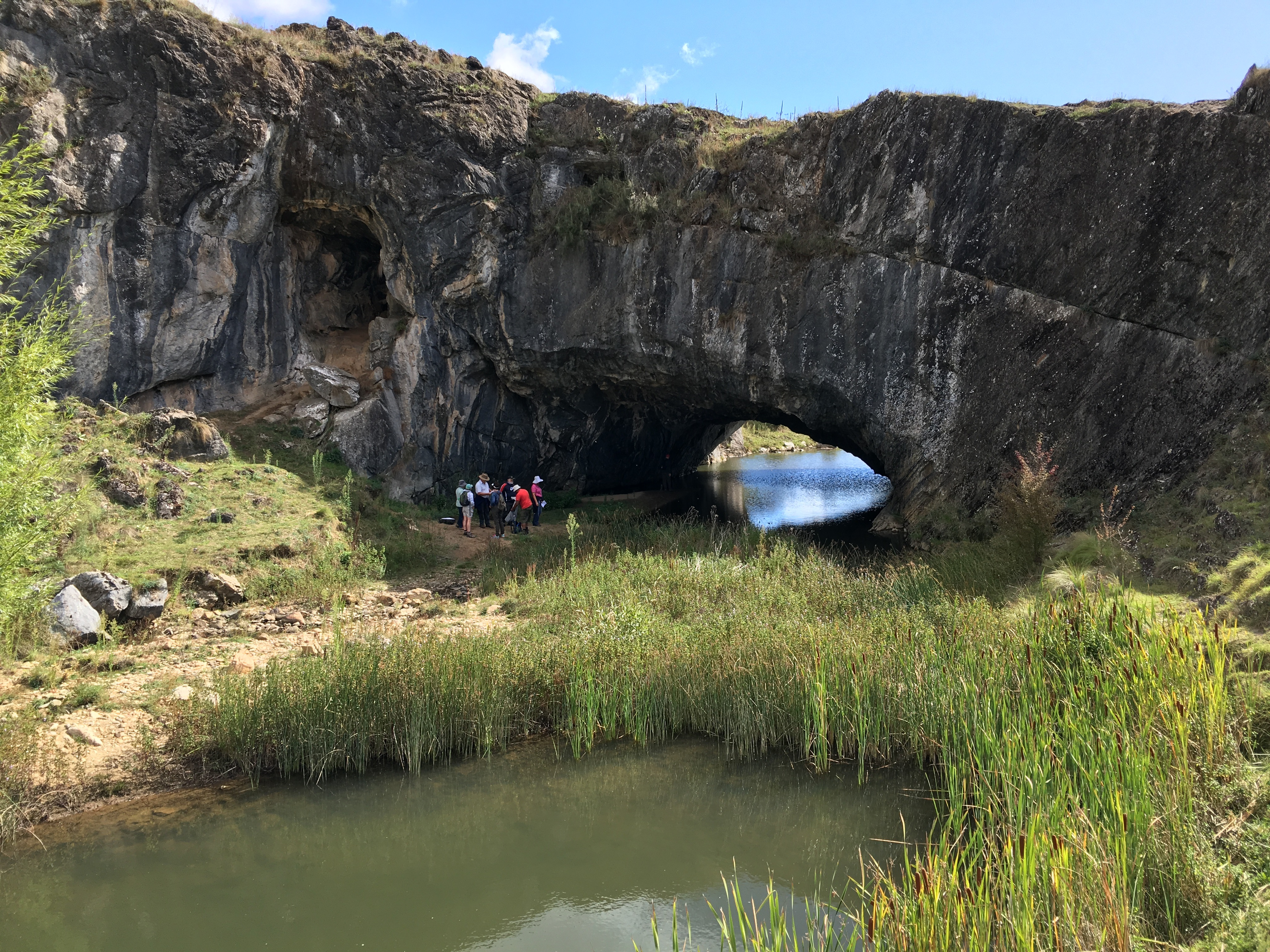
- Limestone arch known as London Bridge

- Location within New South Wales
- Location: Burra Creek Nature Reserve, near Queanbeyan, New South Wales, Australia
- Coordinates: 35°30′57″S 149°15′45″E
- Geology: Limestone karst meander cutoff

London Bridge is a limestone karst hollowed out by Burra Creek, a tributary of the Queanbeyan River of the Molonglo River, located near Queanbeyan, in New South Wales, near Canberra, Australia. It is now isolated as a meander cutoff and consists of a limestone arch. The arch was listed on (now defunct) Register of the National Estate.

It was first discovered by the European explorers in 1822 Captain Mark Currie, Brigadier Major John Ovens, Joseph Wild, and accompanied by two Aboriginal guides.

The karst arch was in danger of being flooded by the construction of the London Bridge Dam but owing to its limited catchment, the Australian Government constructed Googong Dam instead. London Bridge is located within the boundaries of the Burra Creek Nature Reserve.
