= Wright, Australian Capital Territory =

Wright
- Suburb
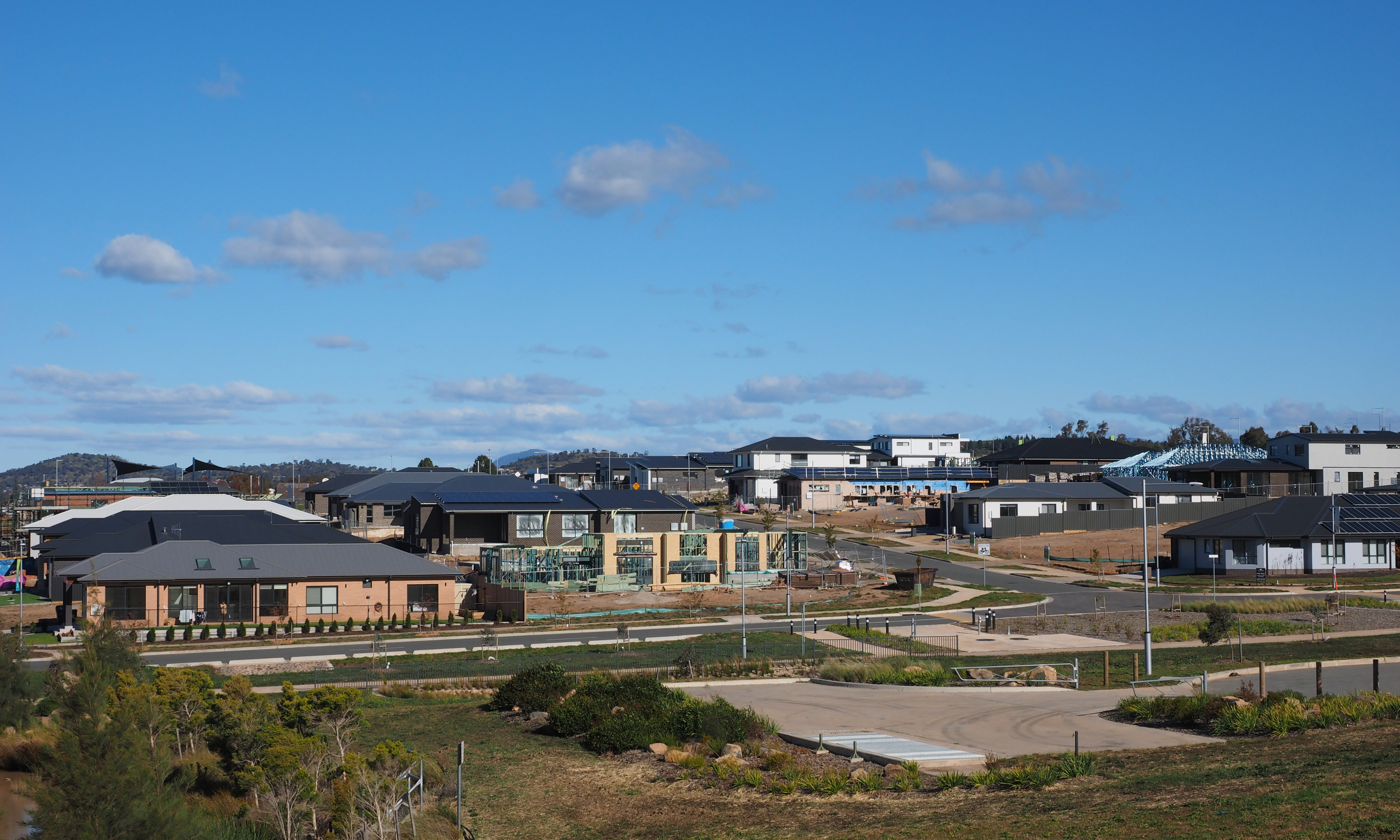
- Wright in May 2020

- Coordinates: 35°19′1″S 149°1′59″E
- Country: Australia
- State: Australian Capital Territory
- City: Canberra
- District: Molonglo Valley
- Location: 13 km (8.1 mi) WSW of Canberra CBD; 21 km (13 mi) W of Queanbeyan; 102 km (63 mi) SW of Goulburn; 299 km (186 mi) SW of Sydney

Government
  - Territory electorate: Murrumbidgee
  - Federal division: Bean

Area
  - Total: 1.3 km^{2} (0.50 sq mi)
- Elevation: 580 m (1,900 ft)

Population
  - Total: 3,808 (SAL 2021)
- Postcode: 2611
- Gazetted: 27 July 2010
- Website: Wright
Suburbs around Wright
Denman Prospect	Molonglo	Molonglo
	Wright	Coombs
	Duffy	Holder

Wright (postcode: 2611) is a suburb in the Molonglo Valley district of Canberra, located within the Australian Capital Territory, Australia. It is named in honour of Judith Wright, a poet, environmentalist and Aboriginal land rights advocate.

Wright is in the Murrumbidgee electorate for the Australian Capital Territory Legislative Assembly and the Division of Bean for the Australian House of Representatives.

== Location and urban structure ==
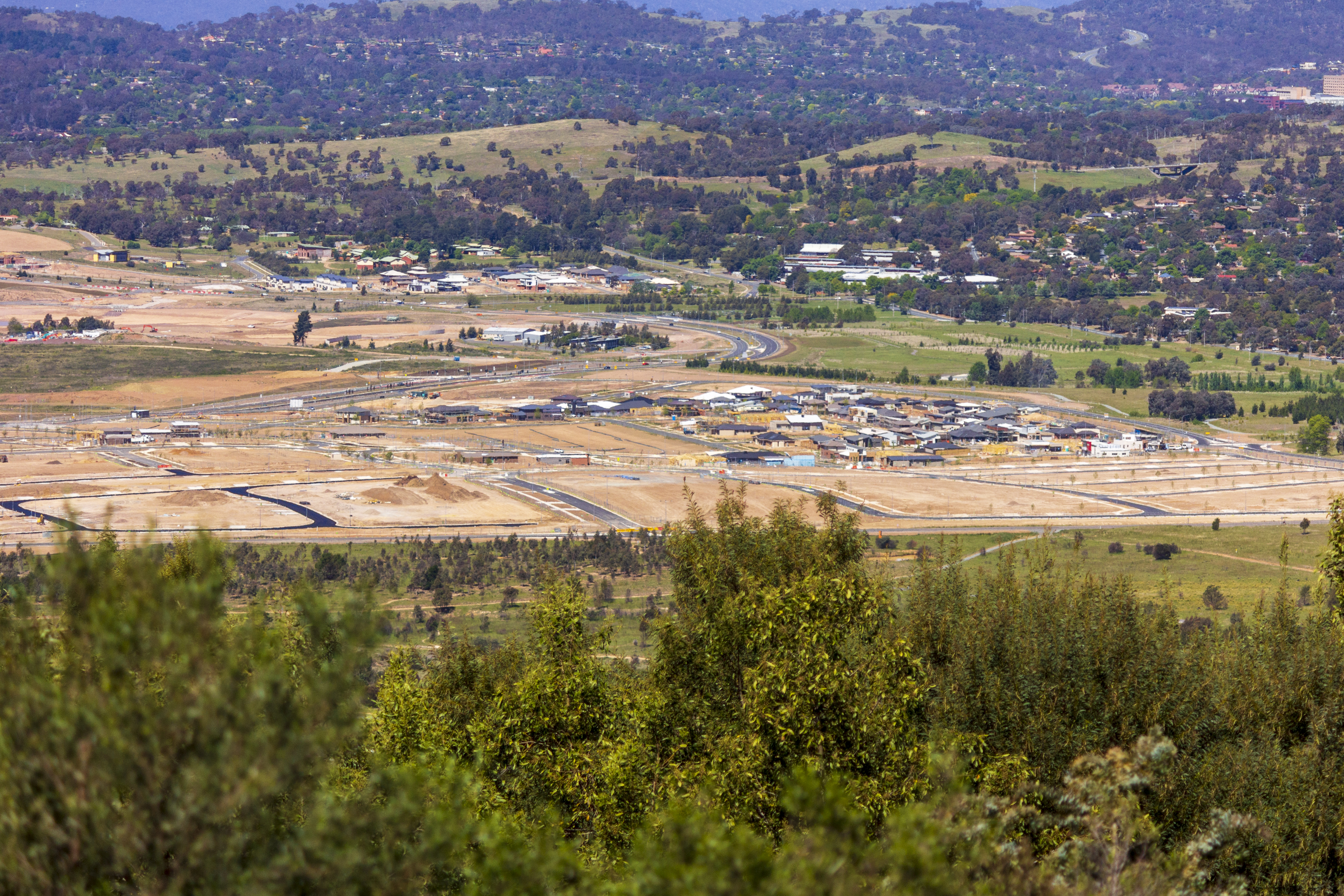
Construction of Wright in 2012 as viewed from Mount Stromlo

Construction of the first house in Wright was completed in June 2012.

=== Demographics ===
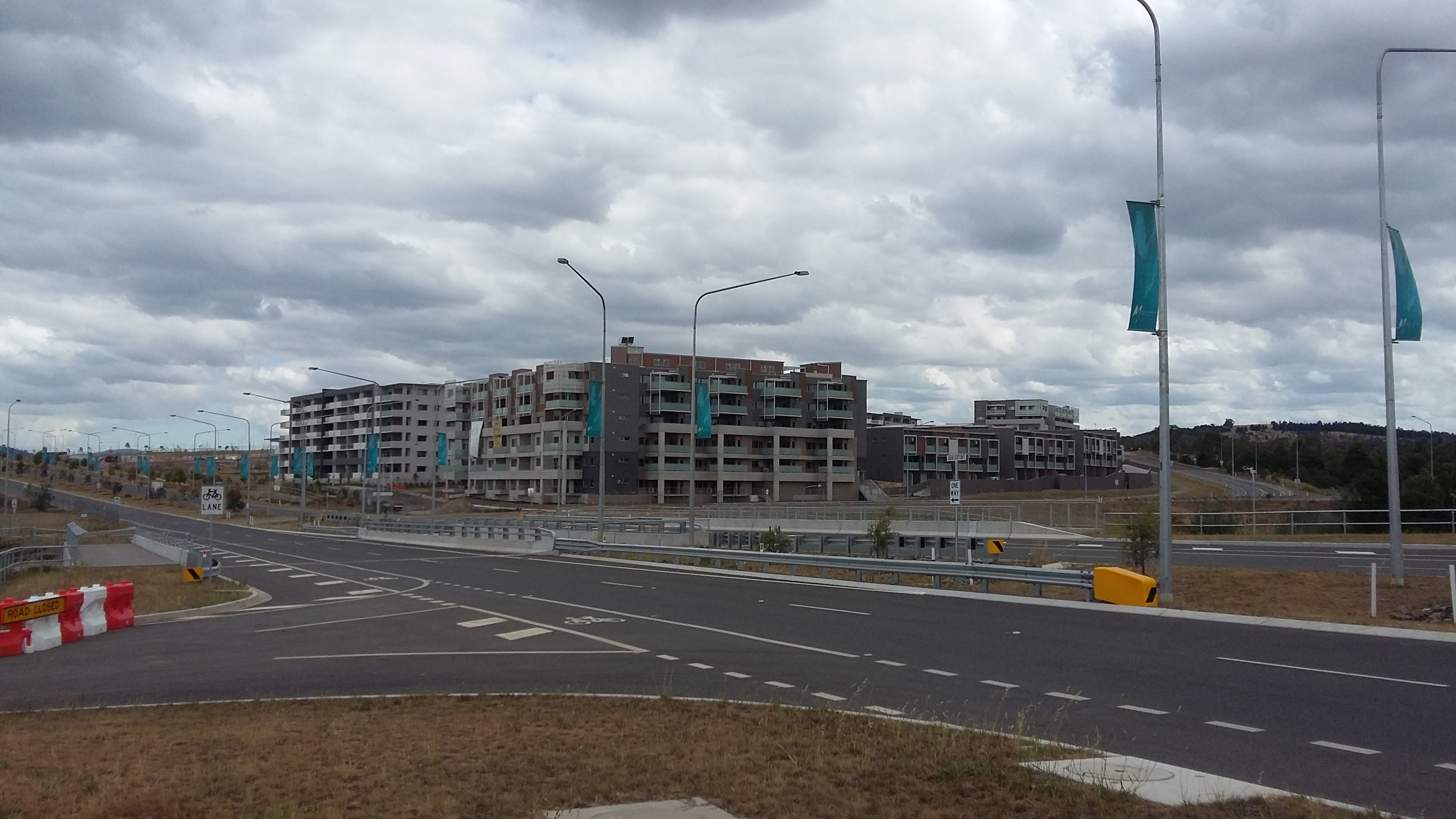
New flats in Wright in December 2015

Wright did not have a separate geographical identifier allocated on the date of the 2011 census, and was grouped with the Weston Creek-Stromlo statistical sub-division. In this division, there was a population of 17, with 10 males and seven females. The ABS recorded nine dwellings, with a median weekly household income of A$2,250. Peculiarly, an unusually high number of motor vehicles per dwelling was recorded, at 12.7.

At the date of the 2016 census, the population of Wright had grown to 2,753, there were 1,262 private dwellings, the median weekly household income was A$2,323, and the number of vehicles per dwelling was 1.8.

== Geology ==
Wright is built on rhyodacite rocks from the Silurian period which are about 414 million years old. These rocks are part of the Deakin Volcanics.

== See also ==
- Canberra bushfire memorial
- List of places in Australia named after people
- Stromlo Forest Park
