= Blundells Cottage =

House and museum in Australian Capital Territory, Australia

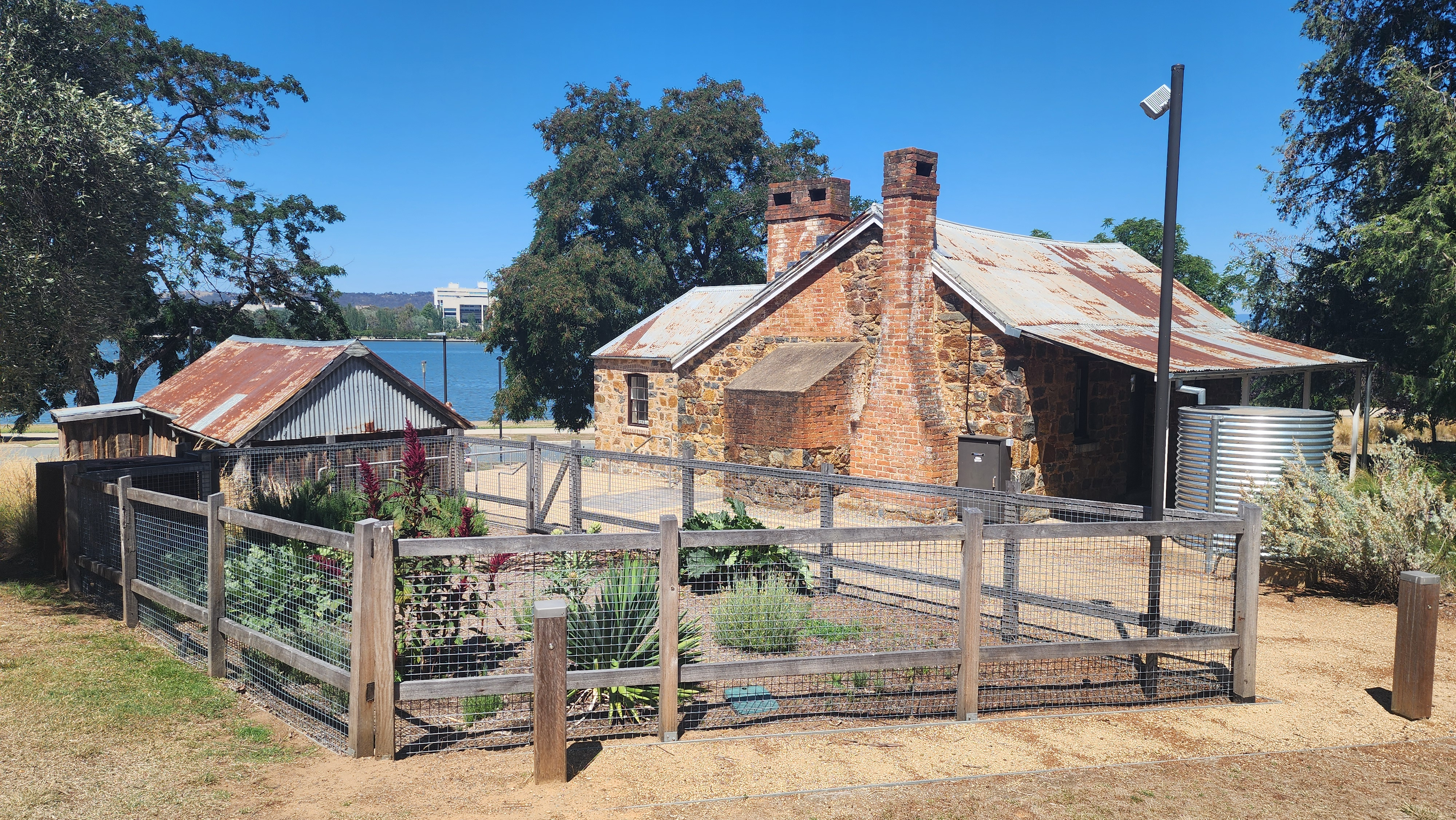
- Overview of the cottage
- Interactive map of the Blundells Cottage area

General information
- Status: Completed
- Type: House (1860s-1960s); Living museum (since 1964)
- Location: Wendouree Dr, Parkes, Canberra, Australian Capital Territory, Australia
- Coordinates: 35°17′35″S 149°08′31″E
- Completed: c. 1858; 168 years ago
- Renovated: c. 1890s; 1960s
- Client: George Campbell
- Owner: Commonwealth of Australia
- Landlord: National Capital Authority (since 1999)

Commonwealth Heritage List
- Official name: Blundells Farmhouse, Slab Outbuilding and Surrounds, Wendouree Dr, Parkes, ACT, Australia
- Type: Listed place
- Criteria: A., B., D., E., H.
- Designated: 15 July 2005
- Reference no.: 105734

Blundells Cottage is a heritage-listed six-roomed stone cottage located on the northern shore of Lake Burley Griffin, in Canberra, Australia. The cottage was built by George P. Campbell in about 1858 for his ploughman William Ginn on the original Molonglo River floodplain. Ginn lived there with his family until 1874 and then Flora and George Blundell moved in and remained there until about 1933. Flora was a midwife and George a bullock driver for Campbell. In 1913, the Duntroon estate was acquired by the Commonwealth of Australia to form part of the new Federal Capital Territory, although the Blundells continued to live there. Then, Harry and Alice Oldfield moved to the cottage in 1933.

The cottage was added to the Commonwealth Heritage List on 15 July 2005.

== Ginn family ==
The Ginn family were the first residents of the Cottage. They lived there from about 1860 until 1874. William Ginn (1821-1904) was born in Hertfordshire, England. He came to Australia as an assisted immigrant in 1857 with his wife Mary Wade and two children Walter and Henry. They were immediately recruited by George Campbell of Duntroon, where William worked as a ploughman.

In 1860, George Campbell built the stone cottage for William Ginn who was regarded as an excellent employee. He also rented 90 acres of land to the Ginn family. Two more children were born to William and Mary after their arrival at Duntroon – Agnes in 1858 and Gertrude in 1865. These two girls are shown in the photograph. Agnes later married Thomas Lawson and lived in a property called Maudale in Berrima. Gertrude did not marry and when Agnes's husband died in 1929, both women returned to Canberra to live. Agnes died in 1946 and Gertrude in 1953 at the age of 87.

By 1874, William Ginn had saved enough money to buy his own land. He selected 80 acres near Gungahlin which he called “Canberra Park” and built a stone house. He lived there with his wife, Mary, until his death in 1904. His two sons Walter and Henry helped him develop the property and inherited “Canberra Park” when William died.

== Blundell family ==
When William Ginn left the cottage in 1874, George Campbell rented the house to George Blundell who was his bullock driver. The family lived there for the next 60 years. George Blundell (1846-1933) was born in the Canberra region. His father was Joseph Blundell who had arrived in Australia in 1826 as a convict. In 1827, he was assigned to Robert Campbell who was the owner of Duntroon at that time. He received his pardon in 1842 and soon after, married Susan Osborne. The couple had eleven children.

George Blundell who was Joseph's third child, married Flora McLennan (1844-1917), daughter of John Mclennan, a Scottish immigrant from the Isle of Skye who arrived in Australia in 1852 when Flora was only 7 years old. The family moved to the Barrington district near Maitland where John's uncle John McInnes lived.

Immediately after their wedding, George and Flora moved into Blundell's Cottage and over the next fifteen years, they had eight children. Flora was the local community midwife. The family grew crops on the land surrounding the cottage and in 1893, one newspaper reported that “Mr George Blundell has a magnificent crop and has already started haymaking.” In those days the house was known as “Poplar Grove”.

Because of their growing family, George and Flora made extensive additions to the cottage in 1888. A new wing was added to the south and a verandah to the front. They became respected citizens of the Canberra district. When Flora died in 1917, an obituary was published in the Queanbeyan Age. George was one of the pioneers of the district who was chosen to be presented to the Duke of York when Parliament House was opened in 1927. George died in 1933 and the cottage was rented to the Oldfield family.

== Oldfield family ==
Harry Oldfield (1885-1942) and his wife Alice Matilda (1888-1958) moved into the cottage in 1933. They further developed the farm and supplied milk and eggs to the local community. Harry was a stockman from Yaouk, Adaminaby and was described as “a picturesque Monaro horseman reminiscent of figures in the late “Banjo” Patterson's verse. His obituary described Harry in the following terms.

"Canberra people will remember the neatly dressed shepherd - dressed usually in jodhpurs with his beautiful black mare of Youah breed. They little knew of the amazing experiences of this man who had been station over-seer, drover and stockman."

Harry died in 1942 and Alice continued to live at the cottage. In 1957, The Australian Women's Weekly published an article on the residents of Canberra and one of those interviewed was Alice Oldfield who described her living conditions. The interviewer said.

"I asked Mrs. Harry Oldfield, the happiest woman I found in Canberra, who lives in the old farmhouse at Scott's Crossing, just across the Molonglo from Parliament. Canberra is the only capital in the world with a farm right in the middle and a farmhouse with a genuine camp-oven, slab kitchen, shingles, and kerosene lamps. Electricity has not yet reached Scott's Crossing.

"You wouldn't catch me living in any other place," Mrs. Oldfield told me, even though I have to chop up three tons of firewood each winter."

Alice died in 1958.

== Preservation ==
After Alice Oldfield died in 1958, the cottage was planned to be demolished. However Sir William Holford proposed that the cottage be kept as a museum. The National Capital Development Commission renovated the cottage and it was managed as a museum by the Canberra and District Historic Society until 1990. The National Capital Authority manages Blundells Cottage as a museum open to the public.

Blundells Cottage is significant, being one of the few stone buildings of its type to have survived intact in the Australian Capital Territory. It is important for the way it reflects a way of life on a nineteenth-century agricultural estate.

In 1983, It was listed on the now-defunct Register of the National Estate. In 2005, it was added to the Commonwealth Heritage List. In 2013, the ACT Government decided not to proceed with listing on the Australian Capital Territory Heritage Register because the ACT Heritage Act 2004 has no direct effect on land owned by the Australian Government and would duplicate the legal protection already provided under the Commonwealth Heritage List.

== Gallery ==
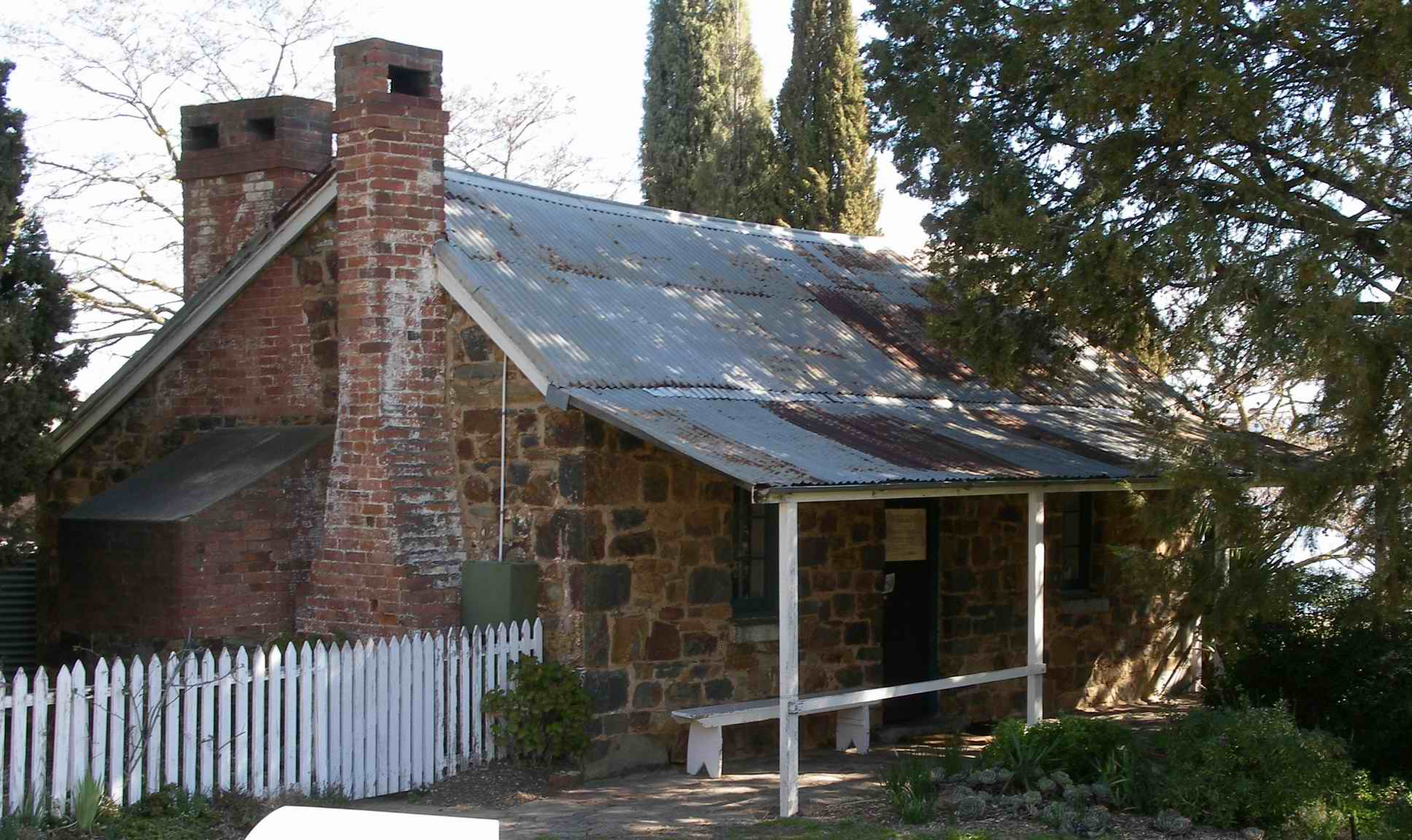
Side exterior of the cottage

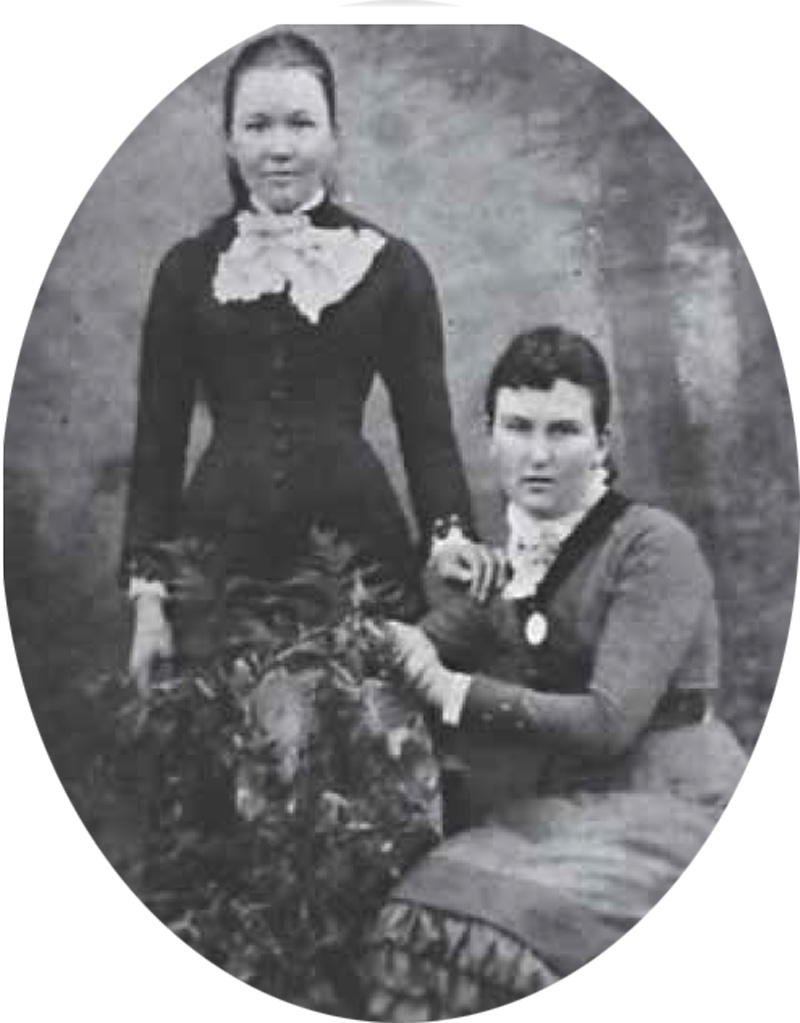
Gertrude and Agnes Ginn

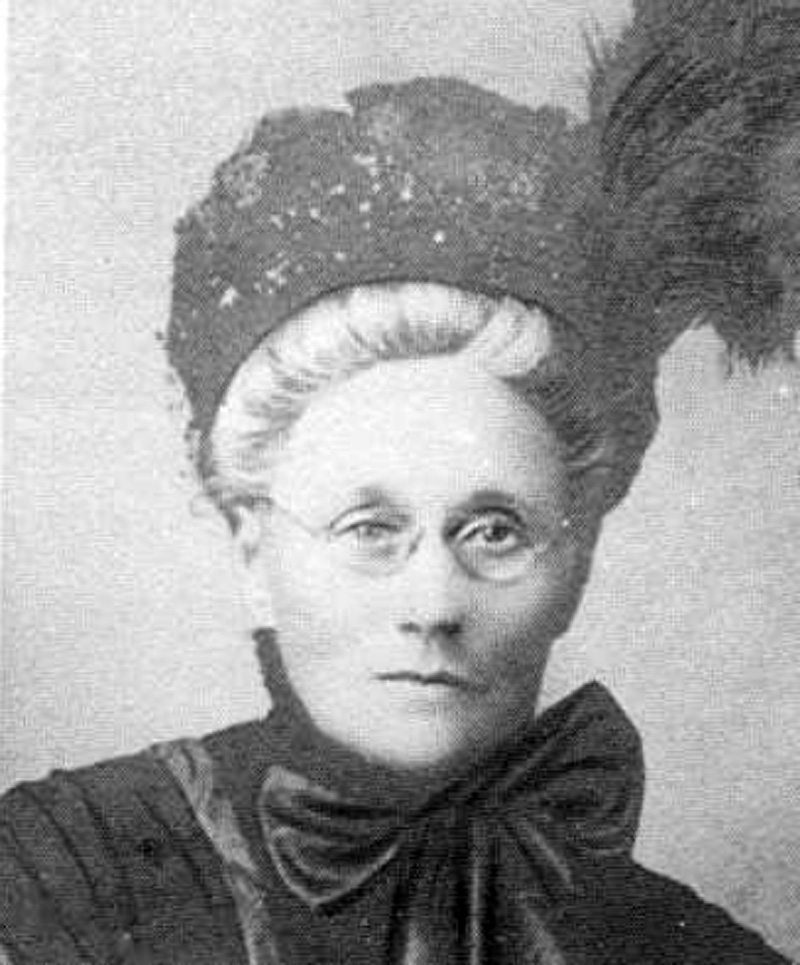
Flora Blundell in about 1900

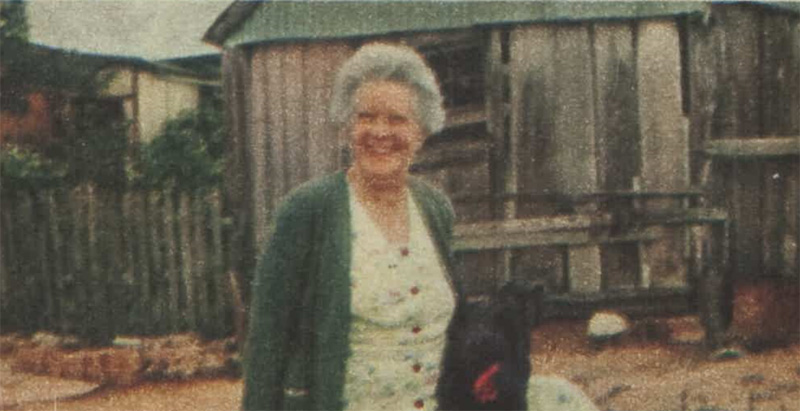
Alice Oldfield in 1957 at Blundells Cottage

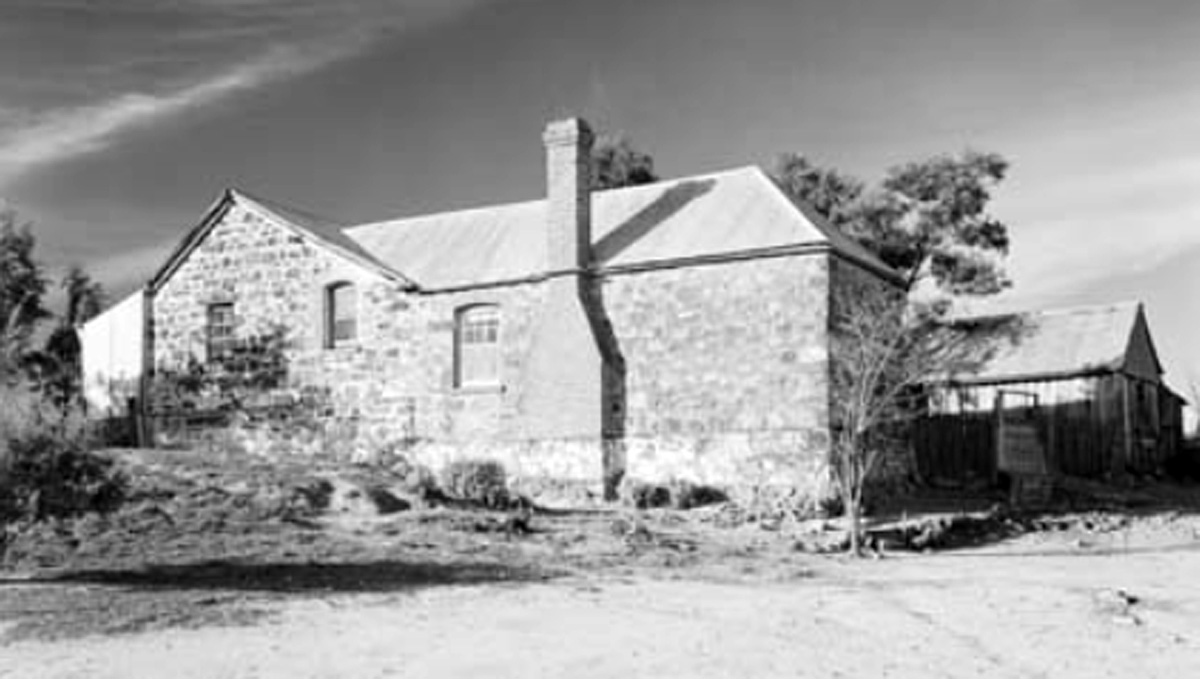
Blundells Cottage in 1955 when it was occupied by Alice Oldfield

== See also ==
- Australian residential architectural styles
- Scott's Crossing Road
