= Scott's Crossing Road =

Scott's Crossing Road Australian Capital Territory

General information
- Type: Road (Former road, decommissioned)
- History: Closed to traffic after completion of Kings Avenue bridge. It was then submerged by the filling of Lake Burley Griffin between 1963 and 1964.

Major junctions
- North end: Anzac Parade; Reid, Canberra
- South end: King Edward Terrace; Parkes, Canberra

Location(s)
- District: Canberra Central

Highway system
- Highways in Australia; National Highway • Freeways in Australia; Road infrastructure in Canberra

Scott's Crossing Road was a former roadway connecting north and south Canberra, across the Molonglo River floodplain. It was named after John Scott, who was an early settler in the region, and whose homestead was located at its southern end. It was submerged by the filling of Lake Burley Griffin.

There is also a street within the Canberra CBD (Civic), named Scotts Crossing. This road is also named for John Scott and for the former crossing across the Molonglo.

== History ==
Scott's Crossing Road was a road in the Canberra region that formed a link across the Molonglo River floodplain, and it was used to link the area on the southern side of the river to the north. It was named for John Scott, an early settler, whose homestead once stood where the National Gallery of Australia is located at the southern end of the road. Blundell's Cottage was located at the northern end and was preserved after the flooding of Lake Burley Griffin as a museum. Another historic building, St John the Baptist Church, is also located at the northern end of this former road. Originally a ford crossed the river, and it was known variously as "Scott's Crossing", "Church Ford", or "The Molonglo Ford". In March 1928 it was proposed that a low-level bridge be erected as the crossing was dangerous after heavy rains. The new bridge was completed in January 1929, and the length of Scott's Crossing Road was sealed within the following weeks, as part of a citywide road improvement scheme. Scott's Crossing Road was closed upon completion of Kings Avenue bridge, and submerged by the filling of Lake Burley Griffin between 1963 and 1964.
