= Molonglo Plain =

Plain in the Australian Capital Territory

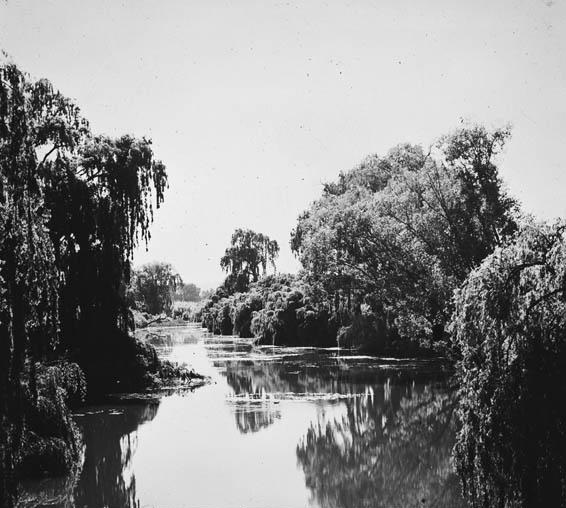
Molonglo River circa 1920s

The Molonglo Plain generally refers to the flood plain of the Molonglo River and specifically the one located in the Australian Capital Territory that was inundated during the mid-1960s in order to create Lake Burley Griffin. This plain was one of fours plains - the Ginninderra Plain, the Limestone Plain, and the Tuggeranong Plain (Isabella's Plain) are the others - upon which the city of Canberra is situated.

The term Molonglo Plains refers collectively to the flood plains along the entire length of the Molonglo River, including the flood plain located north-east of Queanbeyan on the Molonglo River. The upper Molonglo Plain sometimes referred to as the Hoskinstown Plain is bordered to the east by the low ridges of the Turallo Range, Forbes Creek Ridge and Thurralilly Hill before the steep rise up to the top of the Great Dividing Range.

The area is noted as the birthplace of cricketer and Australian rules football pioneer Tom Wills.

== Upper Molonglo Plain ==
Some of the Queanbeyan district's most successful rural stations specifically 'Gidleigh', 'Foxlow', 'Carwoola' and 'Primrose Valley' were located on the Molonglo flood plain. 'Foxlow' was established by HC Antill who relinquished the grant to John Hoskings after whom the village of Hoskinstown is named.

== Lower Molonglo Plain ==
Prior to Lake Burley Griffin's inception the fertile soils of the Molonglo plain were some of most productive in the Canberra region. John Joshua Moore was the first pastoralist to occupy land on the present site of Canberra, preceding Robert Campbell by about a year. It was, however, only an outstation formed by an overseer and a few convict stockmen. Moore's property took in the present sites of the hospital, of Civic Centre and of the Australian National University and the portions of the Molonglo Plain In 1843, during a depression, he sold the land to Lieutenant Lieutenant Arthur Jeffreys, R.N., son-in-law of Robert Campbell.

Of the original buildings situated on the former Molonglo Plain, only 'Blundells cottage' remains today. It was constructed in the year 1858 by Robert's son George Campbell for the use of his ploughman William Ginn at a point above the natural flood level, about 400 metres north of the course of the Molonglo River. A number of others building situated near to or on the Molonglo Plain have been lost to Canberra's urban development over the past 70 years. The Klensendorlffe villa is one of the most impressive, a substantial oblong stone ten-roomed stone house, which stood until the mid-1920s near the present site of Albert Hall. The Acton homestead established in about 1843 by Lieutenant Arthur Jeffreys survived until 1941 when it was demolished to make way for the Canberra Community Hospital.

== River flow changes ==
The viability of the floods plains relies of regular flood events that deposit soil and other water borne nutrients onto the plain.

The Googong Dam was constructed in 1979 on the Queanbeyan River at a point about 5 km above Queanbeyan. This structure regulates river flows below the junction of the Queanbeyan and Molonglo River. The lower Molonglo River experienced its last major flooding event in 1971.
