= Stromlo Forest Park =

Bike and recreation park in Canberra, Australia

Coordinates: 35°19′13″S 149°01′32″E

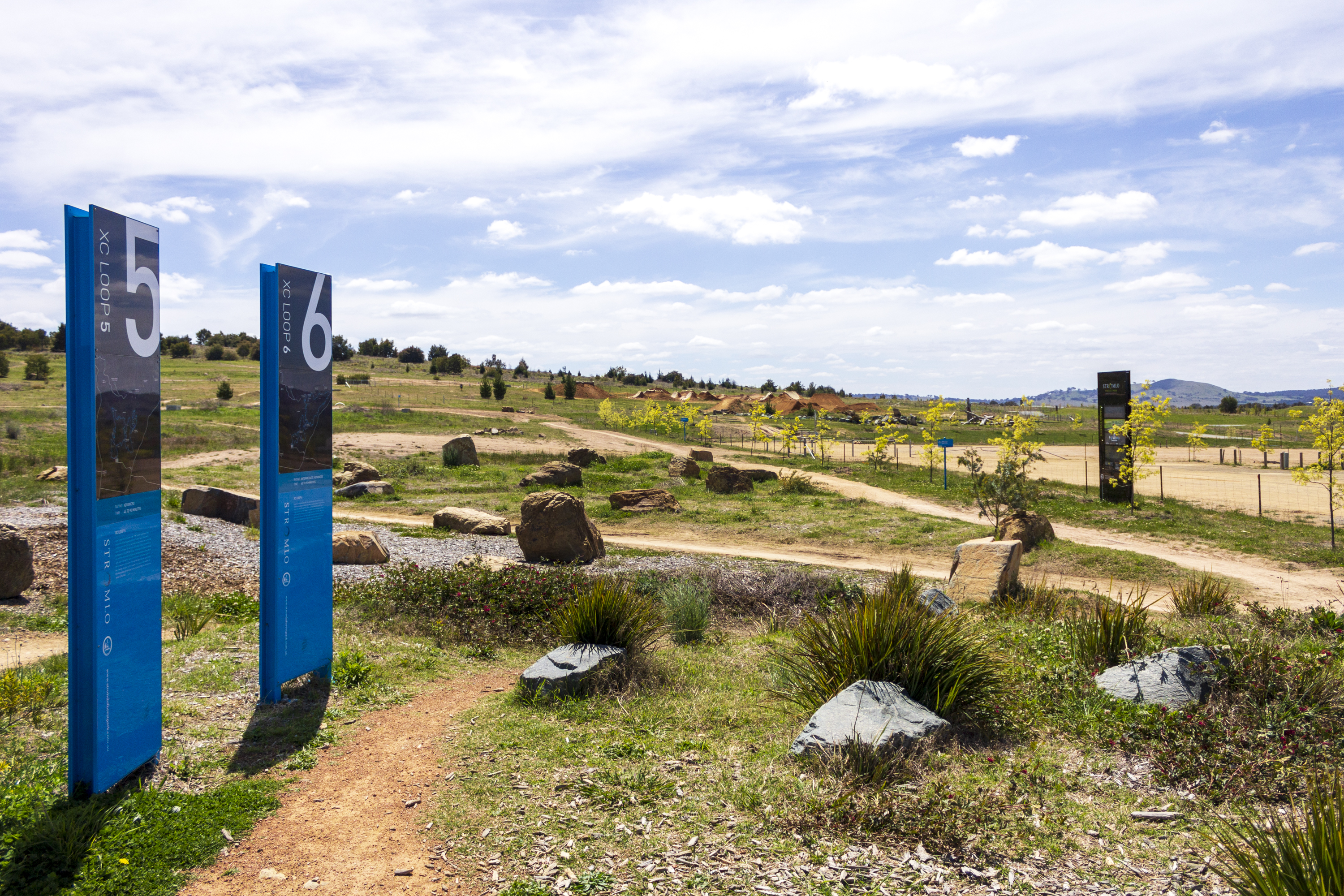
Stromlo Forest Park MTB and BMX trailhead in an early stage of development, 2011

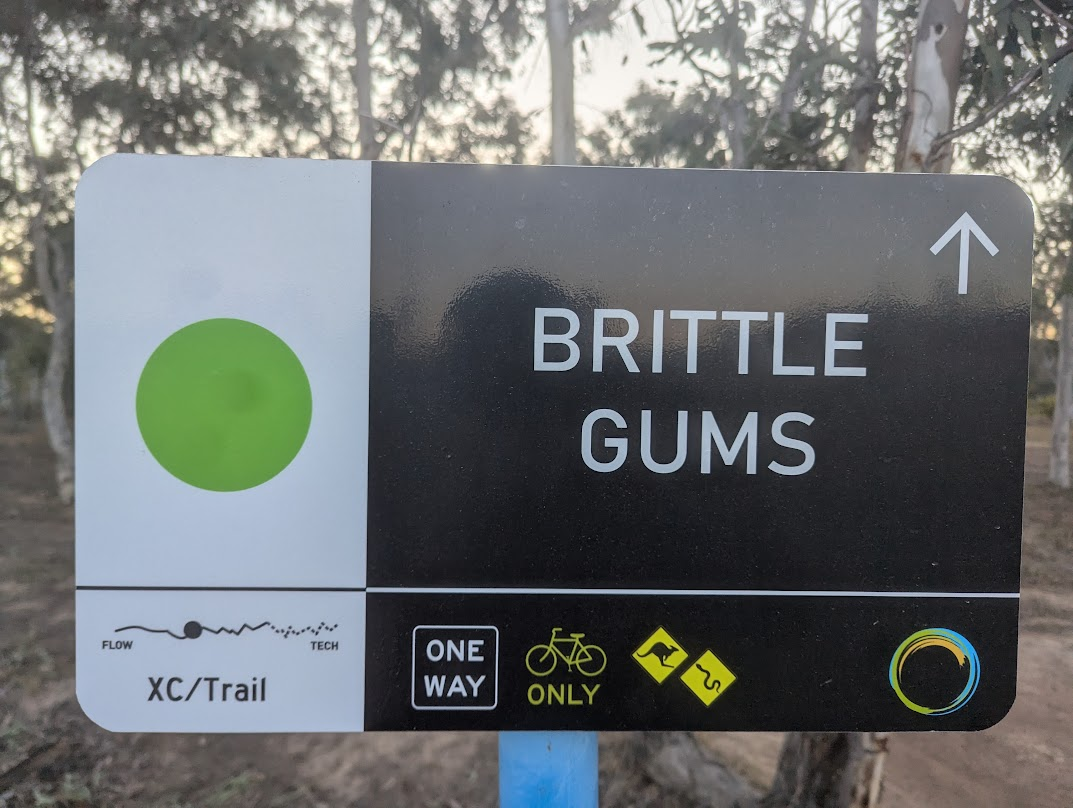
A mountain bike trail sign at Stromlo Forest Park

Stromlo Forest Park is an outdoor recreation facility supported by the Australian Capital Territory (ACT) government. The park is located in western area of the ACT, adjacent to the Molonglo Valley, and about 15 minutes' drive from Canberra's Central Business District.

== Facilities ==
The area around Mount Stromlo was redeveloped following the 2003 Canberra bushfires to provide over 50 kilometres (31 mi) of single-track cross-country and downhill mountain biking (MTB) trails, a pump track, a Four-Cross course, BMX jumps, a 1.2 kilometres (0.75 mi) criterium road cycling track, equestrian trails, and a 2.5 kilometres (1.6 mi) groomed grass cross country running trail. It also contains the ACT Bushfire Memorial. The park has an event pavilion with office space and change rooms, a cafe, a MTB shuttle bus, a kids play area, BBQs, and several carparks.

The park has been sponsored by University of Canberra since 2023.

== Future development ==
The area is under active development, including plans for a district oval in the south-east corner. Following community consultation, a new tracks and trail masterplan for Stromlo Forest Park was released in August, 2024.

== History ==
Prior to the 2003 bushfires, Mount Stromlo hosted some of the best and oldest mountain bike trails in Australia. In May 2006 extensive remedial work and trail reconstruction was commenced by World Trail in partnership with Canberra Off-Road Cyclists mountain bike club and the ACT Government.

Mount Stromlo hosted the 2009 UCI Mountain Bike & Trials World Championships that attracted more than 30,000 visitors from up to 40 countries. The event involved more than 750 of the world's top riders who competed in the four mountain bike disciplines of cross country, downhill, four cross and observed trials.

== See also ==
- Cycling in Canberra#Stromlo Forest Park
