= Denman Prospect =

- Suburb
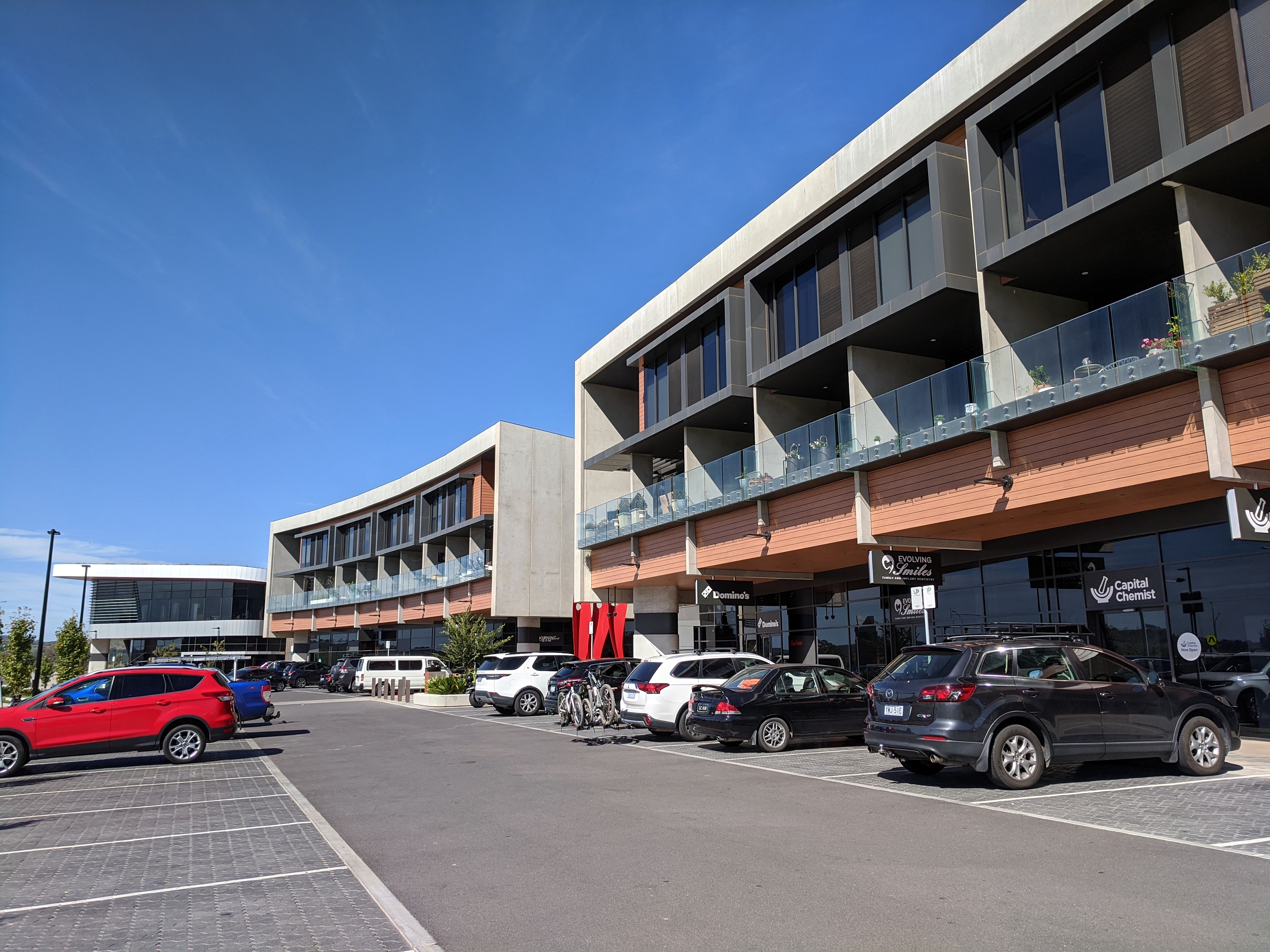
- The Denman Village shopping centre in 2020

- Coordinates: 35.303°S 149.024°E
- Country: Australia
- State: Australian Capital Territory
- City: Canberra
- District: Molonglo Valley
- Location: 13 km (8.1 mi) W of Canberra CBD; 24 km (15 mi) W of Queanbeyan; 103 km (64 mi) SW of Goulburn; 300 km (190 mi) SW of Sydney

Government
  - Territory electorate: Murrumbidgee
  - Federal division: Bean

Area
  - Total: 1.07 km^{2} (0.41 sq mi)
- Elevation: 560 m (1,840 ft)

Population
  - Total: 2,759 (SAL 2021)
- Time zone: UTC10
- Postcode: 2611
- Gazetted: 14 June 2012
- Website: Denman Prospect
Suburbs around Denman Prospect
Whitlam	Molonglo
Denman Prospect	Molonglo
Wright	Coombs

Denman Prospect is a suburb currently under development in the Molonglo Valley district of Canberra, located within the Australian Capital Territory, Australia.

It is named in honour of Lady Denman, the wife of the fifth Governor-General of Australia, The Lord Denman. The principal ceremonial occasion during Lady Denman's term as first lady was the inauguration of the Federal capital on 12 March 1913. Lady Denman stood upon the newly laid Foundation Stones and pronounced, "I name the capital of Australia – Canberra". The name Denman Prospect was selected to distinguish the locality from the town of Denman, New South Wales. The use of the suffix 'prospect' meaning view, vision or the outlook for the future, is considered significant in the context of the naming of Canberra by Lady Denman and Lord Denman's ensuing visionary speech for the future of the capital.

The streets of Denman Prospect are named after activists and reformers.

The first school to be opened in Molonglo Valley, Evelyn Scott School, was opened in 2021 and is located in Denman Prospect.

== History ==
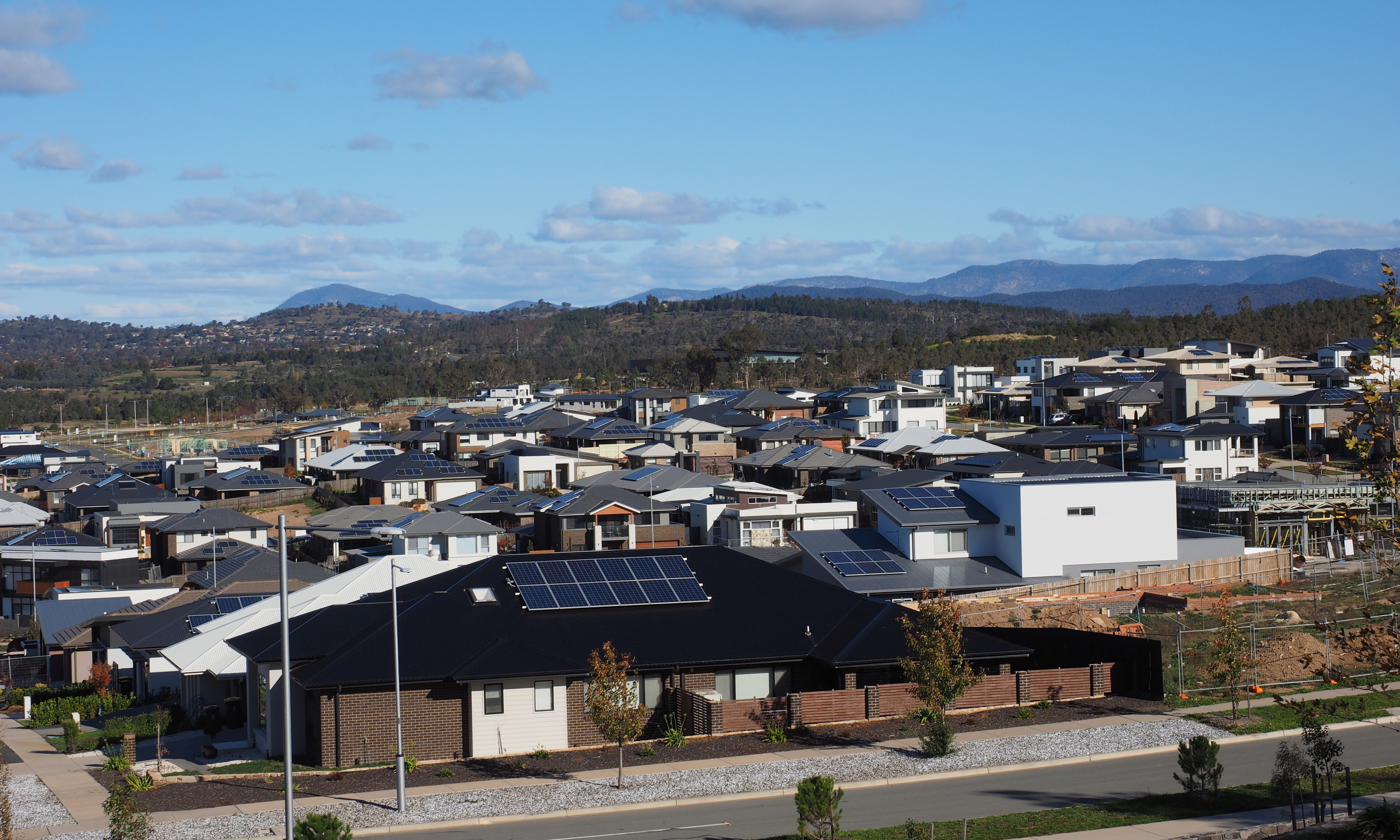
Denman Prospect in May 2020

The ACT government attempted to sell the entire suburb as one lot to a developer first at an auction, and then by negotiation. However the Colliers auction on 12 April 2013 was a failure with only one registered bidder, and then three months of negotiating led nowhere, and so the Land Development Agency will now develop the suburb itself. Blame for the failure to sell to a developer was placed on new solar access regulations, which meant that blocks had to be bigger, or that house sites had to be excavated into the hillside. Denman Prospect was scheduled to be the third suburb to be developed in the Molonglo Valley District and the first in stage 2. In July 2015 the Capital Estate Development company won a tender to build half of the suburb. This company is owned by the Snow family who also own Canberra Airport.

Coppins Crossing bridge was repaired after flooding in 2011.

== Location and urban structure ==
Denman Prospect is located to the north of Uriarra Road, west of John Gorton Drive and south of the Molonglo River. Topographically it is north east of Mount Stromlo with a series of valleys draining eastwards towards the Molonglo River in the south of the suburb, and the north east direction in the north. The highest points of the suburb are along hills on the eastern side at just over 654 metres high. Uriarra Road is about 630 m above sea level. The lowest point is on the Molonglo River just below 499 m above sea level. This makes Denman Prospect the lowest Canberra suburb.

The land area is 107 hectares and will contain 1700 dwellings if fully developed. There will be a local centre and two schools.

Coppins Crossing Road between Uriarra Road and William Hovell Drive has a long history prior to the development of Molonglo, but it will be replaced by John Gorton Drive.

== Wildlife ==
The rare pink tailed worm lizard is found near the Molonglo River. The butterfly Ogyris amaryllis amata occurs near Coppins Crossing. Denman Prospect has been declared a cat containment area where cats are not permitted to roam freely.

== Geology ==
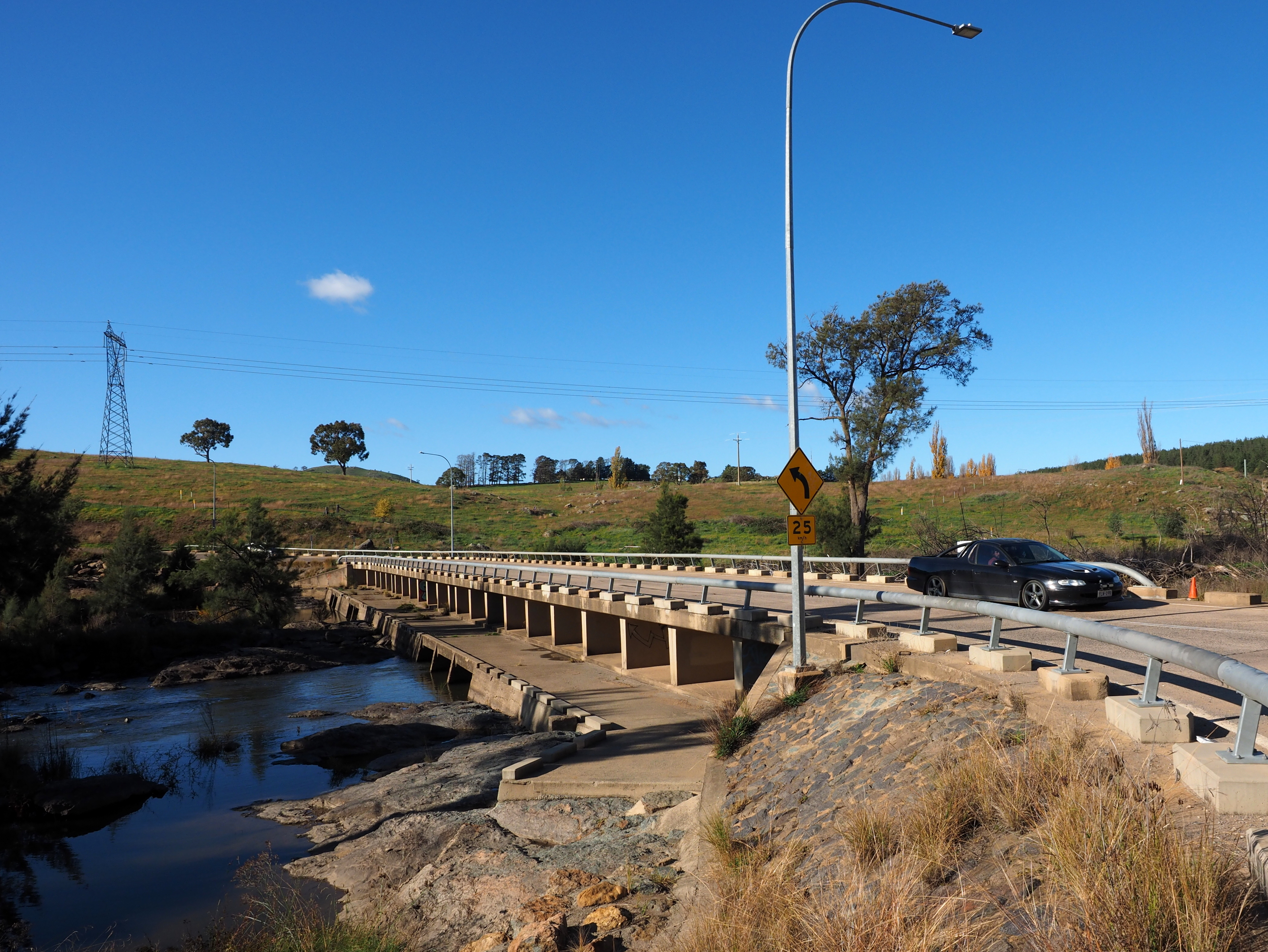
Coppins Crossing in 2020

The suburb of Denman Prospect is split by an east–west direction fault that splays off the Winslade Fault just to the west of the suburb. This fault is marked by quartz. The south side of the fault has been thrown down, and the north side elevated. The north-east heading Winslade Fault itself cuts off the northern tip of the suburb. To the north of the fault are the Mount Painter Volcanics in the north east with tuff composed of dacite fragments and underlying Walker Volcanics in the north west. Mount Painter Volcanics are of late Wenlock age. The rock south of the east–west fault is younger than the rocks to the north. Rocks in the south are rhyodacite from the Deakin Volcanics, and on the far west side of the suburb is ignimbrite and shale from the Laidlaw Volcanics. The Laidlaw Volcanics are the latest in the sequence and are 420.7±2.2 million years old. A sand quarry used to be worked just to the west of Coppins Crossing on the Denman Prospect side of the Molonglo River.
