= Evelyn Scott School =

School in Denman Prospect, Australian Capital Territory

Coordinates: 35.3069°S 149.0267°E

Evelyn Scott School is located in Denman Prospect in the Australian Capital Territory. It is named after Indigenous Australian activist and educator Evelyn Scott.

The school opened to primary school students in 2021. It opened to high school students in 2023. The school has been designed to have Zero emissions, with solar panels and double glazed windows.

Evelyn Scott School offers a modern education with a focus on 21st-century learning philosophies. The school features both indoor and outdoor learning areas, integrated environments, and various facilities, including a gymnasium, sporting oval, library, and secure bicycle parking.

The junior campus, opened in 2021, serves Preschool to Year 6 students, while the senior campus, opened in 2023, accommodates Year 7-10 students. The school supports a range of sports and community activities with its extensive facilities.

As Canberra's 89th public school and second zero-emissions school, Evelyn Scott School emphasises sustainability and delivers the Australian Curriculum with specialised facilities for STEAM, Arts, and Music. Other recreational facilities include a Multi-Purpose Gymnasium, Vinyl Basketball Court that are available to the public, A Multi-Purpose oval, A school library and theatre, and another concrete Basketball Court available only for school students.
