= Molonglo, Australian Capital Territory =

Molonglo
- Suburb
- Coordinates: 35.299°S 149.042°E
- Country: Australia
- State: Australian Capital Territory
- City: Canberra
- District: Molonglo Valley
- Location: 10 km (6.2 mi) W of Canberra CBD; 21 km (13 mi) W of Queanbeyan; 103 km (64 mi) SW of Goulburn; 295 km (183 mi) SW of Sydney

Government
  - Territory electorate: Murrumbidgee
  - Federal division: Bean
- Elevation: 559 m (1,834 ft)

Population
  - Total: 0 (SAL 2021)
- Postcode: 2611
- Gazetted: 14 June 2012
- Website: Molonglo
Suburbs around Molonglo
Molonglo River	Molonglo River	Bandler
Denman Prospect	Molonglo
	Wright	Coombs

Molonglo is a suburb currently under development in the Molonglo Valley district of Canberra, Australian Capital Territory, Australia. The suburb of Molonglo derives its name from an Aboriginal expression meaning "the sound of thunder".

== Location and urban structure ==
Currently in development and planning stages, Molonglo is expected to be the town centre or group centre and will comprise the principal commercial and civic centre for the Molonglo Valley district. It is planned to accommodate approximately 1000 new dwellings in a relatively compact mixed use urban environment.

== Features ==
Molonglo is a cat containment area, as are other new suburbs in the vicinity.

== Geology ==
The suburb of Molonglo is split by an east–west direction fault that splays off the Winslade Fault. This fault is marked by quartz. The south side has been thrown down, and the north side elevated. This fault crosses the Molonglo River at the point where it goes in a tight bend from east to north west. This point also has one other fault crossing and another fault terminating. The rock south of the east–west fault is rhyodacite from the Deakin Volcanics, and to the north are the older Mount Painter Volcanics with tuff composed of dacite fragments.
