= Evelyn Scott (activist) =

Australian educator and activist

Dr Evelyn Scott AO
- Born: Evelyn Ruth Backo; 1935; Ingham, Queensland
- Died: 21 September 2017 (aged 81–82); North Queensland
- Partner: Allen Scott

Evelyn Ruth Scott AO (1935 – 21 September 2017) was an Indigenous Australian social activist and educator. She played a major role in the 1967 Constitutional Referendum to put Indigenous Australians on equal footing with other Australians in relation to the making of special laws and to include Indigenous Australians in official population numbers.

== Early activism ==
Scott began working in the Townsville Aboriginal and Torres Strait Islander Advancement League in the 1960s. She was actively involved in campaigning for the 1967 Constitutional Referendum.

In 1971, she joined the Federal Council for the Advancement of Aborigines and Torres Strait Islanders (FCAATSI) executive as a vice-president. She was a leader in the transformation of FCAATSI into an Indigenous-controlled organisation in 1973, with the support of Josie Briggs. She was active in the first national women's organisation, the National Aboriginal and Islander Council, formed in the early 1970s.

She became Chair of the Council for Aboriginal Reconciliation (CAR) in the late 1990s, succeeding Patrick Dodson, at a challenging time when the federal government led by John Howard was cutting reconciliation funding. Under her leadership, the CAR produced a draft Declaration for Reconciliation.

== Awards and honours ==
Scott was inducted onto the Victorian Honour Roll of Women in 2001 and received the Centenary Medal in the same year. She was appointed Officer of the Order of Australia in the 2003 Australia Day Honours.

== Personal life and death ==
Scott was the mother of rugby league player Sam Backo. In 2015, Scott was a resident in a care facility in Cairns.

Scott died on 21 September 2017 aged 81. She was afforded a state funeral, the first Indigenous woman to receive a Queensland state funeral. The funeral was held on 6 October 2017 at the Townsville Stadium and was attended by Queensland Premier Annastacia Palaszczuk, Leeanne Enoch (the first Indigenous woman to serve as a minister in a Queensland Government), Pat Dodson, and many other Indigenous community leaders. Senator Dodson delivered a eulogy which described Scott's leading role in the 1967 referendum to recognise Indigenous Australians.

== Legacy ==
The Evelyn Scott School, in the Australian Capital Territory, was named for her and opened in 2021.

On the 28 May 2023, Dr. Scott was honoured with a Google Doodle featured on the Australian home page of the search engine. In Google's tribute to her, they acclaim her life as a tireless campaigner and unwavering leader, resulting in numerous achievements, awards, and honours. The Google Doodle features an illustrated design by Indigenous guest artist Samantha Campbell, who is descended from the Dagoman people from the country around Katherine in Australia's Northern Territory.
