= Pierces Creek, Australian Capital Territory =

Coordinates: 35°19′56″S 148°55′16″E

Pierces Creek (Australian Capital Territory)

Pierces Creek is a former rural forestry settlement in the Australian Capital Territory in Australia, which was managed by Housing ACT since the 1980s. The 13 homes at the settlement were destroyed during the 2003 Canberra bushfires and have never been rebuilt despite a proposal by the ACT Government in the mid-2000s.

The Pierces Creek settlement was originally established as a semi-permanent camp in the 1920s to house workers in the surrounding forest plantations with permanent housing being constructed in the 1930s to attract men with their families to work in the industry. In the 1980s, the forestry industry had dramatically changed and workers were no longer required to live in the settlement and the management of the houses along with the existing tenants handed to Housing ACT. Tenants could not purchase their houses due to the settlement being zoned as "plantation forestry" under the National Capital Plan.

Before the fire, the settlement consisted of:

13 houses
Blacksmith's shop
Mature exotic plantings
Site Office
Depot
Explosives Magazine
Orchard
Playground

Along with the other former forestry settlements in the ACT (Stromlo & Uriarra), the settlement was virtually destroyed in the 2003 bushfires, displacing 12 families. Following the fire, the ACT government led by then Chief Minister Jon Stanhope proposed the construction of a "world class sustainable village with 50 houses". The proposed development required an amendment to the National Capital Plan. The National Capital Authority (NCA) responsible for the National Capital Plan rejected to amend the plan, stating that the settlement was too large and initially rejected the proposal, but agreed to amend the National Capital Plan to allow the former residents to purchase their houses from the ACT Government. The ACT Government instead proposed a settlement of 25 to 30 houses, however this too was rejected by the NCA. The NCA instead wanted a settlement of the original size of 13 homes to be rebuilt. However the proposal eventually fell through and the project was cancelled. After further clarification, the NCA was informed that the existing National Capital Plan allowed for the purchase of the homes and did not require to be amended, with Draft Amendment 51 – Pierces creek formally withdrawn on 10 December 2009. The settlement to this day has not been rebuilt. In 1991, a bushfire also destroyed $1.5 million worth of pine trees at Pierces Creek.

== See also ==
- 2003 Canberra bushfires
- National Capital Authority
- ACT Government
