= Coombs, Australian Capital Territory =

Coombs
- Suburb
- Coordinates: 35.31517281866322°S 149.04130469639102°E
- Country: Australia
- State: Australian Capital Territory
- City: Canberra
- District: Molonglo Valley
- Location: 13 km (8.1 mi) W of Canberra CBD; 22 km (14 mi) W of Queanbeyan; 101 km (63 mi) SW of Goulburn; 298 km (185 mi) SW of Sydney

Government
  - Territory electorate: Murrumbidgee
  - Federal division: Bean

Area
  - Total: 2.3 km^{2} (0.89 sq mi)
- Elevation: 560 m (1,840 ft)

Population
  - Total: 4,851 (SAL 2021)
- Postcode: 2611
- Gazetted: 27 July 2010
- Website: Coombs
Suburbs around Coombs
Molonglo	Molonglo
Wright	Coombs
Duffy	Holder	Weston

Coombs (postcode: 2611) is a suburb in the Molonglo Valley district of Canberra, located within the Australian Capital Territory, Australia. It is named in honour of H. C. "Nugget" Coombs, a prominent public servant, economist, and the first Governor of the Reserve Bank of Australia. Streets and public places in Coombs are named with the theme of persons notable for public service.

== Suburb amenities ==
After prolonged negotiations the Coombs Local Shopping centre is now home to a convenience store, cafe and pub. The area is also home to a medical centre, gym, veterinary clinic and an early learning centre.

The Coombs and Wright Village is also in the development stages and planned to be home to a number of new facilities including a community centre.

== Education ==
The suburb is home to Charles Weston Primary School which opened in 2016 and is located between Woodberry Avenue and Madgwick Street. The school has priority enrollment for residents of Coombs and Molonglo valley suburbs Wright and Denman Prospect.

- Charles Weston Primary School
