= Molonglo Valley =

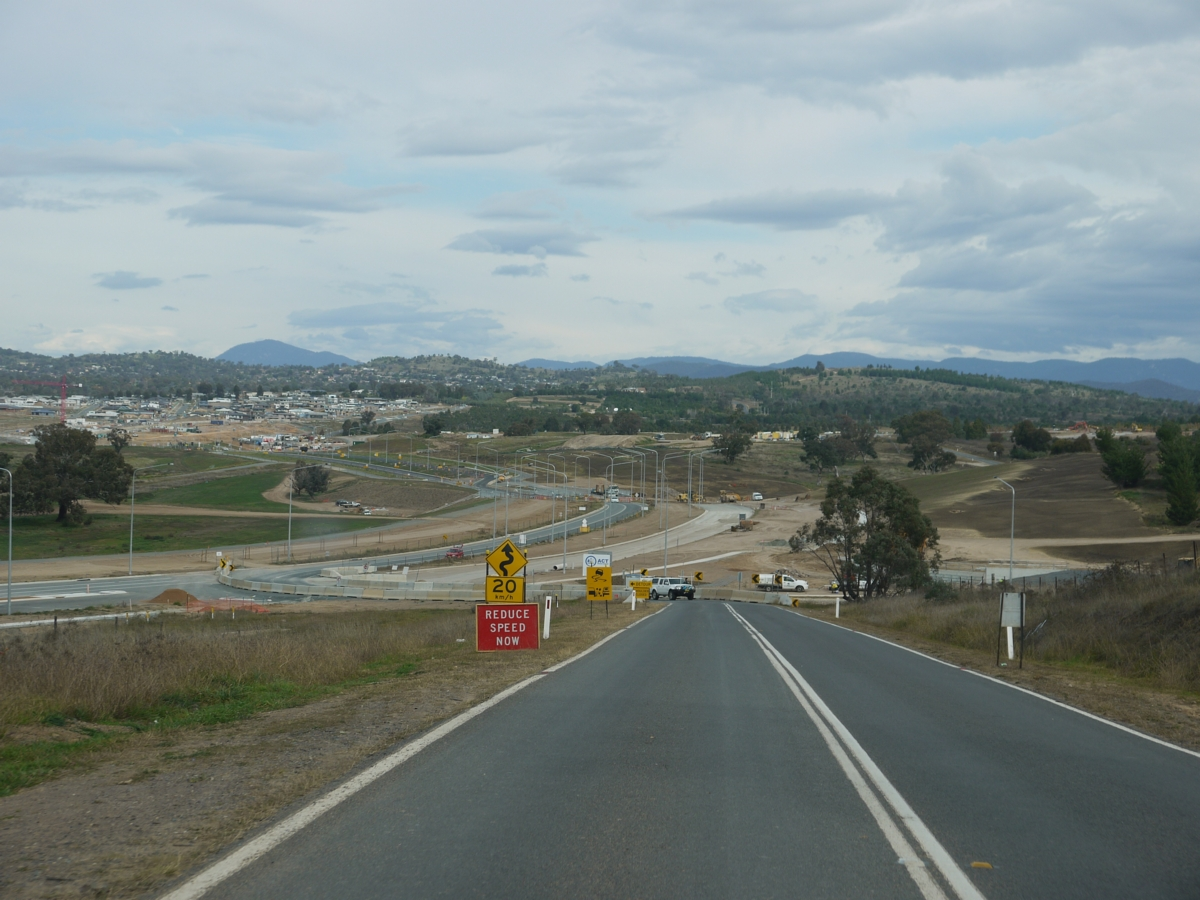
- Coppin's Crossing Road, looking south along John Gorton Drive toward the suburbs of Coombs and Wright

- Interactive map of Molonglo Valley
- Coordinates: 35°19′9.07″S 149°2′29.61″E
- Country: Australia
- State: Australian Capital Territory
- Location: 10 km (6.2 mi) W of Canberra

Government
  - Territory electorate: Murrumbidgee
  - Federal division: Bean Canberra

Area
  - Total: 27.2 km^{2} (10.5 sq mi)

Population
  - Total: 11,435 (2021 census)
  - Density: 420.4/km^{2} (1,088.8/sq mi)
- Postcode: 2611
- Gazetted: 14 October 2010
- Website: Molonglo Valley
Localities around Molonglo Valley
Belconnen	Belconnen	North Canberra
Stromlo	Molonglo Valley	Canberra Central
Stromlo	Weston Creek	Woden Valley

Molonglo Valley is a district in the Australian Capital Territory in Australia. The district is subdivided into divisions (suburbs), sections and blocks and is the newest district of the ACT. The district is planned to consist of thirteen suburbs, planned to contain 33,000 dwellings, with an expected population of between 50,000 and 73,000. To be developed in three stages over more than ten years, the district will contain a principal town centre and a secondary group centre, with residential suburbs located to the south and north of the Molonglo River; located to the west of Lake Burley Griffin.

The name Molonglo is derived from an Aboriginal expression meaning "the sound of thunder".

At the 2021 census, the population of the district was 11,435, an increase from 4,578 in 2016.

== Establishment and governance ==
The traditional custodians of the district are the indigenous people of the Ngunnawal tribe.

Following the transfer of land from the Government of New South Wales to the Commonwealth Government in 1911, the eighteen original districts were established in 1966 by the Commonwealth via the gazettal of the Districts Ordinance 1966 (Cth) which, after the enactment of the Australian Capital Territory (Self-Government) Act 1988, became the Districts Act 1966. This Act was subsequently repealed by the ACT Government and the district is now administered subject to the Districts Act 2002.

The land was used for pine forests prior to the devastation caused by the 2003 Canberra bushfires; leaving the land empty and ready for potential development. To accommodate future expected population growth and housing demand, The Canberra Spatial Plan, already in development at that time and formally released during 2004, proposed increased urban density along established (road) transport corridors. Further land releases were proposed, including continuing development in the district of Gungahlin by maintaining the 1967 "Y-Plan"; and the development of new releases in the Molonglo Valley, previously set aside as green corridors.

In June 2008 the Conservation Council ACT Region presented a report to the ACT Legislative Assembly Proposed Molonglo Urban Developments and their Significant Impact on Endangered Woodlands. Among other things it said: "For the Molonglo development to approach biological sustainability it should involve less clearance of Box - Gum woodland and creation of a large conservation area centered on Central Molonglo. This area could become one of the key areas of woodland conservation in Australia, and balance the loss of biodiversity that will eventuate from urban expansion in the rest of Molonglo."

In July 2008 the ABC reported NCA against central Molonglo development stating that the National Capital Authority (NCA) had ruled out urban development in the central Molonglo area. In speaking to the Standing Committee on Planning and Environment NCA spokesman Todd Rohl said the NCA board was against any future urban development in central Molonglo as well as an area east of the Orana School. Mr Rohl said the NCA had informed the ACT Planning and Land Agency of its decision which was based on environmental reports. "[There are] at least seven species of concern. A couple are listed in the Environment Protection Biodiversity Conservation Act and others are listed in the Nature Conservation Act of the ACT," he said. "Given that we know that there's ecological issues and it's highly constrained ecological area it seems nonsensical to include as urban at this time."

The district was formally gazetted on 14 October 2010.

In February 2024, the ACT Government proposed to the Commonwealth to reclassify the Molonglo group centre as Canberra's sixth town centre.

== Political representation ==
For the purposes of Australian federal elections for the House of Representatives, the District of Molonglo Valley is mostly within the Division of Bean, with the small portion east of Tuggeranong Parkway within the Division of Canberra.

For the purposes of Australian Capital Territory elections for the ACT Legislative Assembly, the District of Molonglo Valley is within the Murrumbidgee electorate.

== Location and urban structure ==
The Molonglo Valley district is located to the north of the district of Weston Creek and to the south of the district of Belconnen. It is within relatively close proximity of the city; approximately 10 kilometres (6.2 mi) west of the Canberra central business district. By releasing land closer to the city, it is expected to reduce urban sprawl in Canberra. However, the close proximity to the city will mean that the land will be in high demand and is therefore likely to be quite expensive..

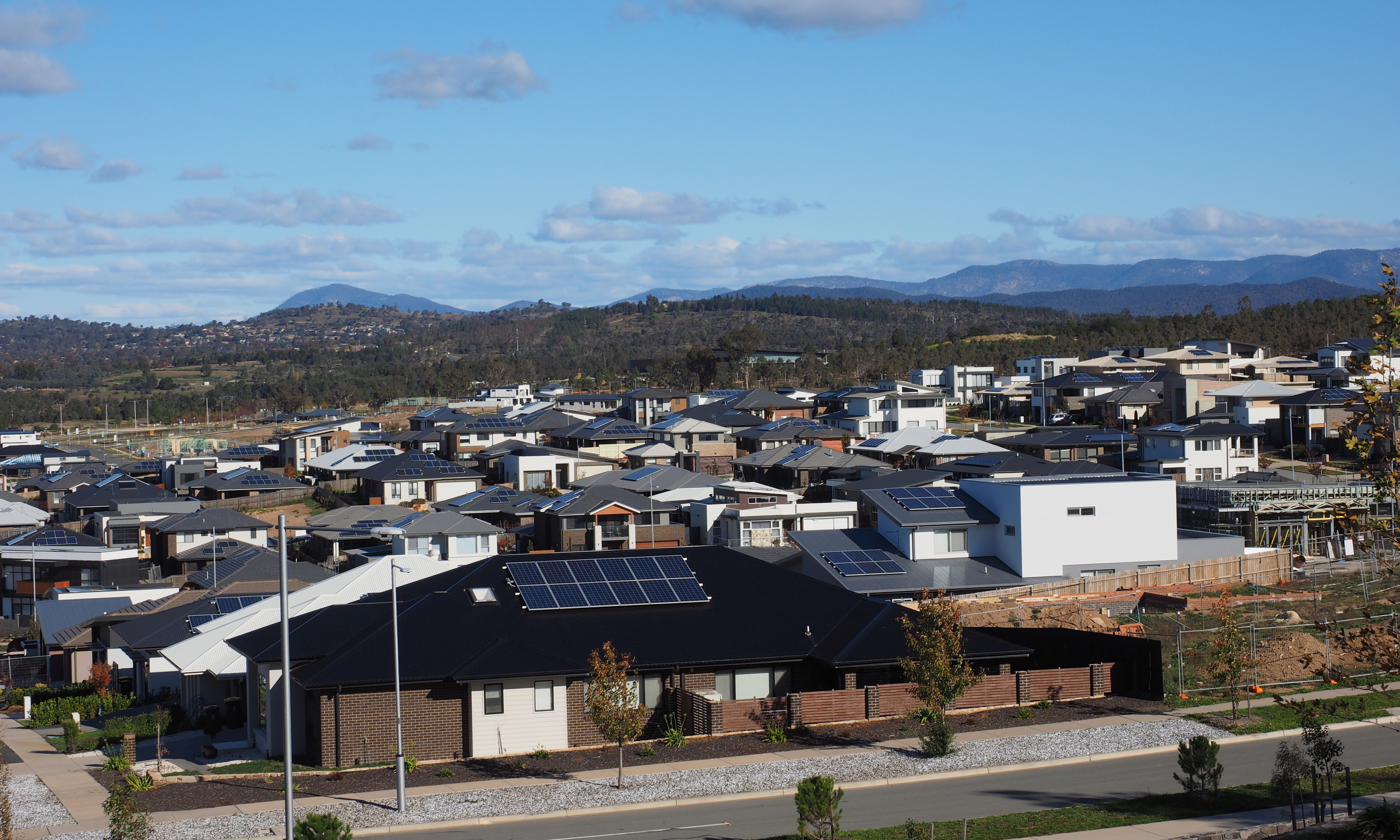
Houses in Denman Prospect in 2020

The first two suburbs in Molonglo Valley were Wright and Coombs; they are named for poet, environmentalist and Aboriginal land rights advocate Judith Wright and prominent public servant and economist H. C. "Nugget" Coombs, the first Reserve Bank Governor. Near completion is Denman Prospect, named after Lord and Lady Denman, to be followed by Molonglo, a local Aboriginal word for thunder. Sulman, is named for architect and town planner Sir John Sulman, whose work can be seen in Civic.

Coombs is located on the southern bank of the Molonglo River, north-east of John Gorton Drive (the Molonglo Valley North-South Arterial road). Wright lies further west, north of Duffy, and south-west of John Gorton Drive. Land for these suburbs was released in late May 2010.

It is also expected that the development of the Molonglo Valley district will act as a link between the town centres of Weston Creek to the south and Belconnen to the north..

== List of suburbs ==
- Bandler
- Coombs
- Denman Prospect
- Molonglo
- North Weston
- Sulman
- Whitlam
- Wright

== See also ==
- National Arboretum Canberra
