= List of places in Australia named after people =

This is a list of places named after famous people in Australia:

- Adelaide, South Australia – Adelaide of Saxe-Meiningen
- Alice Springs, Northern Territory – Alice Todd, wife of astronomer Charles Todd
- Augusta, Western Australia – Princess Augusta Sophia
- Bacchus Marsh, Victoria – William Bacchus, early resident
- Batchelor, Northern Territory - Lee Batchelor
- Banks, Australian Capital Territory – Joseph Banks
- Bankstown, New South Wales – Joseph Banks
- Bathurst, New South Wales – Henry Bathurst
- Bendigo, Victoria – William Abednego Thompson indirectly
- Berry, New South Wales – Alexander Berry
- Bentleigh, Victoria – Thomas Bent
- Bicheno, Tasmania – James Ebenezer Bicheno
- Blackall, Queensland – Samuel Blackall
- Blaxland, New South Wales – Gregory Blaxland
- Bligh Park – William Bligh
- Bonner, Australian Capital Territory – Neville Bonner
- Bonython, Australian Capital Territory – John Bonython
- Bourke, New South Wales – Richard Bourke
- Bowen, Queensland – George Bowen
- Brisbane, Queensland – Thomas Brisbane
- Broome, Western Australia – Frederick Broome
- Bruce, Australian Capital Territory – Stanley Bruce
- Brunswick, Victoria – Caroline, Duchess of Brunswick
- Bunbury, Western Australia – Lieutenant Henry Bunbury
- Burnie, Tasmania – William Burnie, director of Van Diemen's Land company in the early 1840s
- Busselton, Western Australia – John Bussell
- Byron Bay, New South Wales – John Byron
- Cairns, Queensland – William Cairns
- Callaghan, New South Wales – Bede Callaghan
- Calwell, Australian Capital Territory – Arthur Calwell
- Casey, Australian Capital Territory – Richard Casey
- City of Playford - Thomas Playford IV
- Chapman, Australian Capital Territory – Austin Chapman
- Chermside, Queensland – Herbert Chermside
- Chifley, Australian Capital Territory – Ben Chifey
- Chisholm, Australian Capital Territory – Caroline Chisholm
- Churchill, Victoria - Winston Churchill
- Collie, Western Australia – Alexander Collie
- Conder, Australian Capital Territory – Charles Conder
- Cook, Australian Capital Territory – Joseph Cook
- Coombs, Australian Capital Territory – Herbert Coombs
- Cooktown, Queensland – James Cook
- Curtin, Australian Capital Territory – John Curtin
- Daglish, Western Australia – Henry Daglish
- Darling Point, New South Wales – Eliza, Lady Darling
- Darwin, Northern Territory – Charles Darwin
- Duffy, Australian Capital Territory – Charles Duffy
- Dunlop, Australian Capital Territory – Weary Dunlop
- Eden, New South Wales – George Eden
- Emerton, New South Wales - William Frederick Emer, German postmaster
- Elizabeth, South Australia – Elizabeth II
- Elizabeth Bay, New South Wales – Elizabeth Macquarie
- Elizabeth Town, Tasmania – Elizabeth II
- Elliott, Northern Territory - Captain Reginald Douglas "Snow" Elliott MBE (1893–1947)
- Evatt, Australian Capital Territory – Herbert Vere Evatt
- Fadden, Australian Capital Territory – Arthur Fadden
- Farrer, Australian Capital Territory – William Farrer
- Fawkner, Victoria – John Pascoe Fawkner
- Fisher, Australian Capital Territory – Andrew Fisher
- Fitzroy, Victoria – Charles Augustus FitzRoy
- Flinders, Victoria – Matthew Flinders
- Flynn, Australian Capital Territory – John Flynn
- Forbes, New South Wales – Francis Forbes
- Forde, Australian Capital Territory – Frank Forde
- Franklin, Australian Capital Territory – Miles Franklin
- Fraser, Australian Capital Territory – Jim Fraser
- Fremantle, Western Australia – Charles Fremantle
- Garran, Australian Capital Territory – Robert Garran
- Gawler, South Australia – George Gawler
- Geraldton, Western Australia – Charles Fitzgerald
- Gilmore, Australian Capital Territory – Mary Gilmore
- Gordon, Australian Capital Territory – Adam Lindsay Gordon
- Gore Hill – William Gore
- Gosford, New South Wales – Earl of Gosford
- Goulburn, New South Wales – Henry Goulburn
- Gowrie, Australian Capital Territory – Earl of Gowrie
- Grafton, New South Wales – Duke of Grafton
- Greenway, Australian Capital Territory – Francis Greenway
- Harrison, Australian Capital Territory – Peter Harrison
- Harvey, Western Australia – John Harvey
- Hawker, Australian Capital Territory – Charles Hawker
- Healesville, Victoria – Richard Heales
- Henderson, Western Australia – Reginald Henderson
- Hervey Bay, Queensland – Augustus John Hervey
- Higgins, Australian Capital Territory – Henry Bournes Higgins
- Hobart, Tasmania – Lord Hobart
- Holbrook, New South Wales – Norman Douglas Holbrook
- Holder, Australian Capital Territory – Frederick Holder
- Holt, Australian Capital Territory – Harold Holt
- Hughes, Australian Capital Territory – Billy Hughes
- Hume, Australian Capital Territory – Hamilton Hume
- Huskisson, New South Wales – William Huskisson
- Isaacs, Australian Capital Territory – Isaac Isaacs
- Jervis Bay, New South Wales – John Jervis
- Kenny, Australian Capital Territory – Elizabeth Kenny
- La Perouse, New South Wales – Jean-François de Galaup, comte de Lapérouse
- Lake Macquarie, New South Wales – Lachlan Macquarie
- Lalor, Victoria – Peter Lalor (indirectly – via Peter Lalor Home-Building Cooperative Society)
- Landsborough, Queensland – William Landsborough
- Latham, Australian Capital Territory – John Latham
- Laverton, Western Australia – Doctor Charles Laver
- Lawson, Australian Capital Territory – Henry Lawson
- Lawson, New South Wales – William Lawson
- Leichhardt, New South Wales – Ludwig Leichhardt
- Leichhardt, Queensland – Ludwig Leichhardt
- Lithgow, New South Wales – William Lithgow
- Lorne, Victoria – John Campbell, 9th Duke of Argyll, Marquess of Lorne
- Lyons, Australian Capital Territory – Joseph Lyons
- Macarthur, Australian Capital Territory – John Macarthur
- Mackay, Queensland – John Mackay
- Macquarie, Australian Capital Territory – Lachlan Macquarie
- Macnamara, Australian Capital Territory – Jean Macnamara
- MacGregor, Australian Capital Territory – William MacGregor
- Mawson, Australian Capital Territory – Douglas Mawson
- Mawson Lakes, South Australia – Douglas Mawson
- McKellar, Australian Capital Territory – Colin McKellar
- Melba, Australian Capital Territory – Nellie Melba
- Melbourne, Victoria – William Lamb, Lord Melbourne
- Mitchell, Australian Capital Territory – Thomas Mitchell
- Monash, Australian Capital Territory – John Monash
- Moncrieff, Australian Capital Territory – Gladys Moncrieff
- Morisset, New South Wales – James Morisset
- Mosman, New South Wales – Archibald Mosman
- Mount Gambier, South Australia – James Gambier
- Mount Hotham, Victoria – Charles Hotham
- Mount Lawley, Western Australia – Arthur Lawley
- Mulgrave, New South Wales – Baron Mulgrave
- Nicholls, Australian Capital Territory – Douglas Nicholls
- O'Connor, Australian Capital Territory – Richard O'Connor
- O'Connor, Western Australia – Charles Yelverton O'Connor
- O'Malley, Australian Capital Territory – King O'Malley
- Oxley, Australian Capital Territory – John Oxley
- Padbury, Western Australia – Walter Padbury
- Page, Australian Capital Territory – Earle Page
- Pagewood, New South Wales – Fred Page
- Parkes, Australian Capital Territory – Henry Parkes
- Parkes, New South Wales – Henry Parkes
- Pascoe Vale, Victoria – John Pascoe Fawkner
- Pearce, Australian Capital Territory – George Pearce
- Phillip, Australian Capital Territory – Arthur Phillip
- Picton, New South Wales – Thomas Picton
- Port Bonython - John Langdon Bonython (1905–1992)
- Potts Point, New South Wales – Joseph Hyde Potts
- Queens Park, Western Australia – Queen Alexandra
- Reid, Australian Capital Territory – George Reid
- Richardson, Australian Capital Territory – Henry Richardson
- Rivett, Australian Capital Territory – David Rivett
- Robertstown, South Australia - John Roberts, early postmaster
- Robinvale, Victoria - Lieutenant George Robin Cuttle (1896–1918), Australian fighter pilot
- Roebourne, Western Australia – John Septimus Roe
- Sackville, New South Wales – Viscount Sackville
- Scoresby, Victoria – William Scoresby
- Scottsdale, Tasmania – James Scott
- Scullin, Australian Capital Territory – James Scullin
- Seddon, Victoria – Richard Seddon
- Shepparton, Victoria – Sherbourne Sheppard, squatter
- Spence, Australian Capital Territory – William Spence
- Spotswood, Victoria – Louisa Spotswood, wife of Richard Seddon
- Stirling, Australian Capital Territory – James Stirling
- Stirling, Western Australia – James Stirling
- Sturt, South Australia – Captain Charles Sturt
- Sutherland, New South Wales, – Forby Sutherland
- Sydney, New South Wales – Thomas Townshend, Lord Sydney
- Symonston, Australian Capital Territory – Josiah Symon
- Taylor, Australian Capital Territory – Florence Taylor
- Telfer, Western Australia - Albert Harold Telfer (1900-1979)
- Theodore, Australian Capital Territory and Theodore, Queensland – Ted Theodore
- Throsby, Australian Capital Territory – Charles Throsby
- Tom Price, Western Australia – Thomas Moore Price (1891–1962), Vice-president of the giant United States steel company Kaiser Stee
- Torrens, Australian Capital Territory – Robert Torrens
- Townsville, Queensland – Robert Towns
- Truganina, Victoria – Truganini
- Tullamarine, Victoria – Tullamareena
- Turner, Australian Capital Territory – George Turner
- Watson, Australian Capital Territory – Chris Watson
- Watsons Bay, New South Wales – Robert Watson
- Wellington, New South Wales – Duke of Wellington
- Wentworth, New South Wales – William Wentworth
- Wentworth Falls, New South Wales – William Wentworth
- Weston, Australian Capital Territory – Edward Weston
- Whitlam, Australian Capital Territory – Gough Whitlam
- Williamstown, Victoria – William IV
- Wisemans Ferry, New South Wales – Solomon Wiseman
- Wollstonecraft, New South Wales – Edward Wollstonecraft
- Wonga Park, Victoria – Simon Wonga
- Wright, Australian Capital Territory – Judith Wright
- Young, New South Wales – John Young

== See also ==
- List of places named after people
