= Gubur Dhaura =

Park and historical site in Canberra, Australia

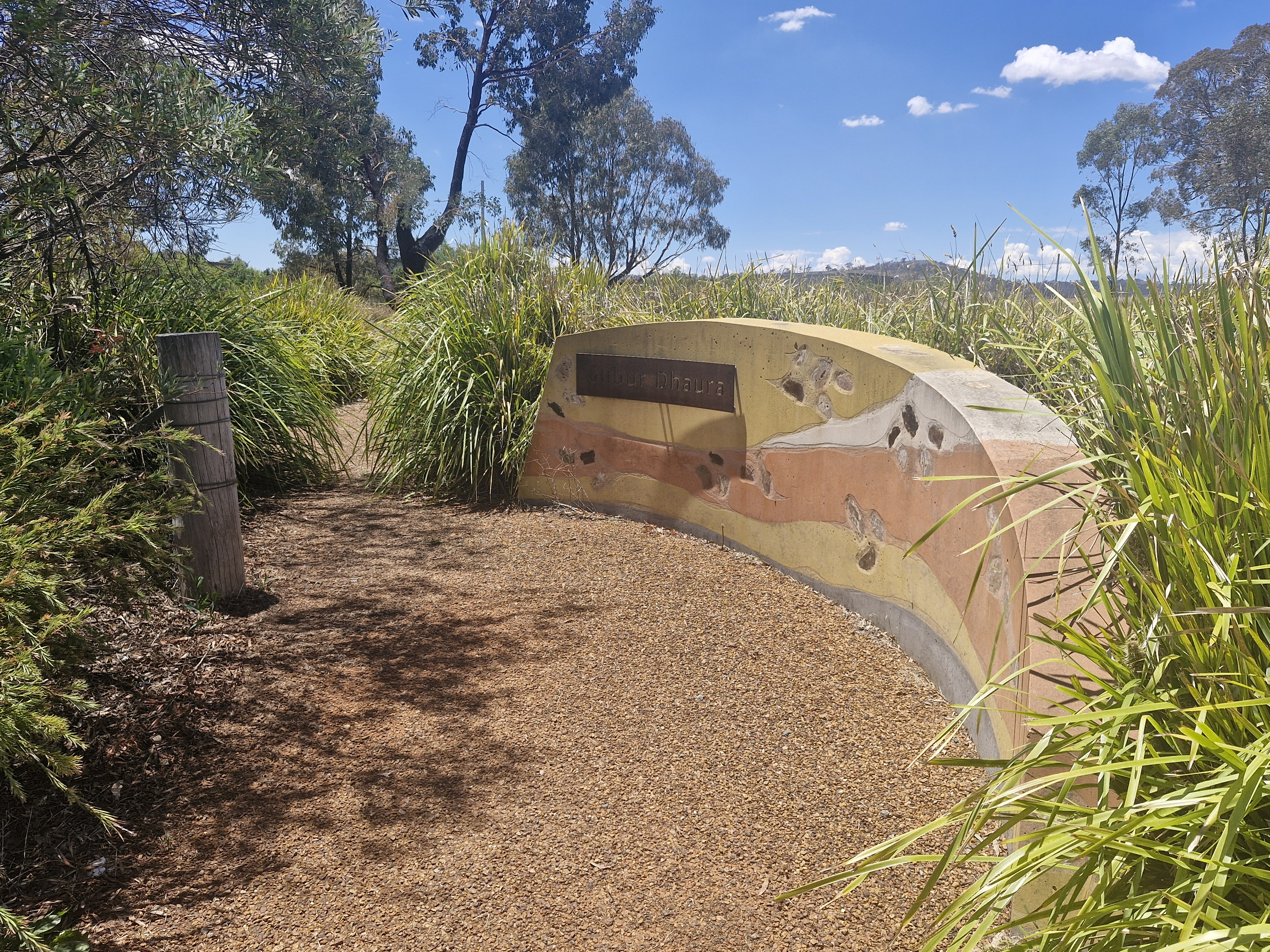
- Entry to Gubur Dhaura off Barbara Jeffries Street
- Interactive map of Gubur Dhaura
- Type: Public reserve
- Location: Franklin, Australian Capital Territory
- Coordinates: 35°11′30″S 149°8′50″E
- Area: 6 ha (15 acres)
- Created: 2011
- Operator: ACT Government
- Status: Heritage listed place

Gubur Dhaura, also known as Gubur Dhaura Heritage Park, is a small public park and historical site located in the Canberra suburb of Franklin, Australian Capital Territory. Gubur Dhaura means red ochre in the Ngunnawal language. Human activity at Gubur Dhaura is believed to span over 5000 years, with the site used for quarrying activities by both the Ngunnawal and Ngarigu peoples and early European settlers. The site was listed on the Australian Capital Territory Heritage Register in 2011. It was opened to the public the same year following rehabilitation of native vegetation, construction of walking tracks as well as interpretive displays and signage providing information on its history.

The park is located on an ironstone ridge, rising 642 m (2,106 ft) above sea level and 31 m (102 ft) above the surrounding basin. It covers an area of 6 ha (15 acres) and is a short walk from both Manning Clark North and Mapleton Avenue light rail stations.

== History ==
=== Indigenous history ===
Gubur Dhaura's elevated location sits between the watersheds of Ginninderra Creek and Sullivans Creek. Views of all the major features of the surrounding terrain made it a significant campsite for the Aboriginal peoples of the area. These landmarks and panoramic vistas are evidence of the site's cultural importance, as a location for teaching the spiritual connection to the land, as well as for ceremony. The location also provided a campsite from where food sources (such as herds of kangaroos) could be spotted, as well as monitoring movements of other tribal groups.

Exposed ironstone outcrops along the ridgeline and clay deposits provided a significant source of red and yellow and white ochres. Archeological investigations of the site during the 1980s and 1990s uncovered some 200 artefacts that indicate Gubur Dhaura was an important site for ochre extraction and processing. It is the only such site in the ACT where lithic technology, including grindstones, has been found in proximity to ochre resources.

While the site is primarily associated with the Ngunnawal people, it is believed that other Indigenous clans in the surrounding area were invited to procure ochres at Gubur Dhaura for trade and ceremonial purposes. Anthropologists note however, the lands surrounding the modern city of Canberra sit within the cultural boundaries of several Indigenous groups, including the Ngarigo and Walgalu peoples, who may also have legitimate claim as custodians of this place. Red ochres in particular were used extensively in Walgalu men's initiation ceremonies.

=== European settlement ===
The first European settler to claim ownership of the site was John Winter in 1861, who named the property "Red Hill". Winter built a house in what is now the neighbouring suburb of Harrison, a short distance away. A lease was taken up by Henry Gozzard in 1871 that took in much of the ridgeline itself. Gozzard granted rights to mine iron ore at the site in 1896. While this venture was unsuccessful, exploration of the site discovered significant deposits of kaolinite (pipe clay). A number of pits were excavated to extract this resource which was used by local settlers to whitewash houses and chimneys. The geology of the ridgeline suggested that gold may have also been present and there is evidence of further prospecting and excavation at the site around the turn of the century.

Well Station Road, an early thoroughfare linking the various leases and homesteads in the Ginninderra district was constructed some time after 1898, crossing the Red Hill ridge (and bisecting the present day Gubur Dhaura Heritage Park). The Red Hill property changed hands a number of times during the 20th century,

Following the selection of Canberra as the site of the national capital, there was demand for construction materials prompting renewed interest in the pipe clay deposits at Red Hill to supply the Canberra brickworks from 1929 onwards. By 1937, the surrounding property had been renamed "Gungaderra" by the new leaseholder, Richard Crace. During World War II, Australian Iron & Steel was granted a mining lease at the site and began test excavations using heavy machinery near the larger ironstone outcrops, although large scale extraction never occurred.

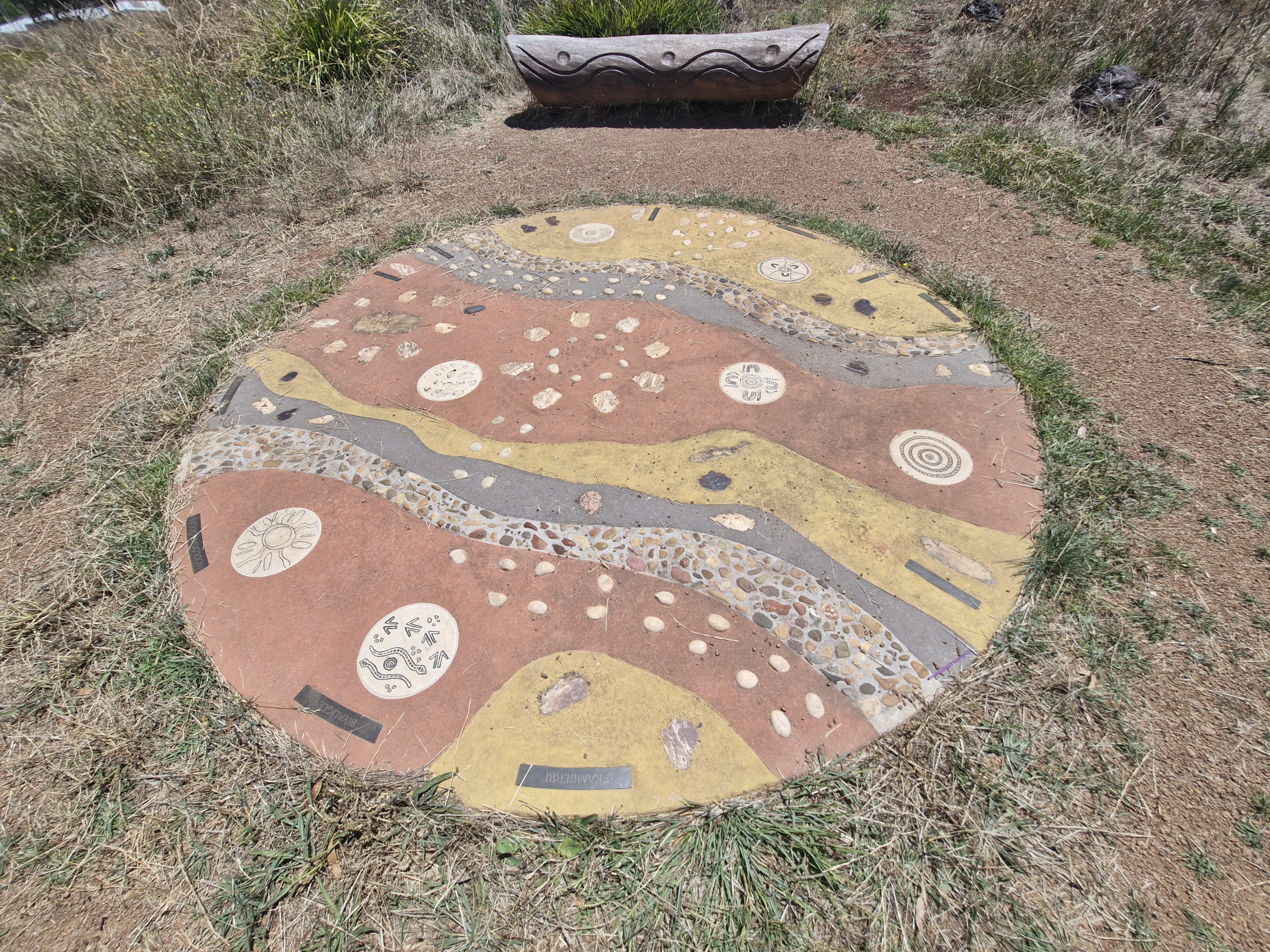
Stylised ground map artwork showing Gubur Dhaura relative to surrounding terrain features

=== Urban development and rehabilitation ===
In the early 21st century, development of the Gungahlin district began to encroach on Red Hill site. When construction of the surrounding new suburb of Franklin began in 2007, the ACT Government Land Development Agency were open to conservation of the hill as parkland. As part of the development, the site was rehabilitated and a number of displays using recovered mining equipment and sculpture pieces designed in cooperation with local indigenous groups were installed along with information signs describing aspects of the site's history.

This project was supported with funding made available by the ACT Government under the ACT Heritage Grants Program, in partnership with Buru Ngunawal Aboriginal Corporation, local Aboriginal landcare groups and the Molonglo Conservation Group. Ngunnawal elders attributed the site's shared indigenous and European history with its preservation. This is in contrast to Capital Hill, which was obliterated to construct Parliament House despite it being an important location for cultural ceremonies for thousands of years. Gubur Dhara was listed on the ACT Heritage Register in 2011, noting its significance to Aboriginal people and early European settlement of the ACT, and use by both groups for the purpose of quarrying.

== Description ==
Gubur Dhaura Heritage Park is surrounded on all sides by suburban residential development. Much of the area within the park is open grassland, with a higher density of large native trees closer to the top of the ridgeline. A viewpoint is provided at the highest point amid an ironstone outcrop, while walking trails circle the perimeter and meander along the ridgeline, including a concrete groundmap designed with local indigenous artists, showing an aerial view of the site in relation to the surrounding mountains and waterways.

The Well Station Track passes through the park from east to west. This follows the alignment of the original Well Station Road that has been restored as a walking trail. Wooden fence posts were installed during the site rehabilitation to highlight the boundaries of the original road reservation. South of the well station track, native grasslands have grown to cover former gravel pits excavated during the 1940s.

== Geology ==
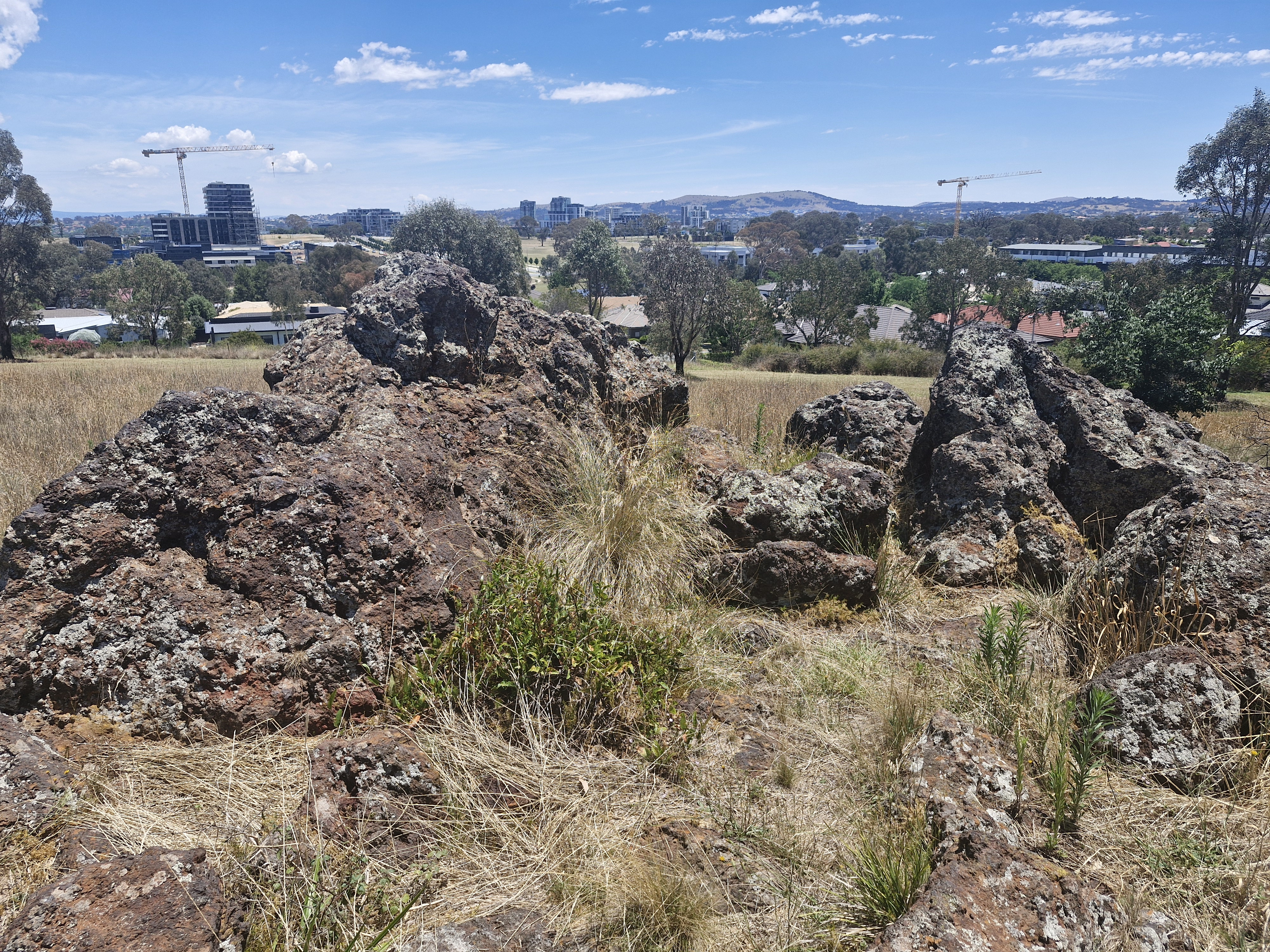
Ironstone outcrop at Gubur Dhaura overlooking the Gungahlin Town Centre in 2025

The area is today characterised by rocky outcrops and the remnants of an excavated pipe clay pit. From the time of their discovery by European settlers, the ironstone features were described as a gossan. Surveys undertaken for the National Capital Development Commission in the 1980s described their formation approximately 425 million years ago during the Silurian period. Subsequent investigation of the site indicate that the iron oxides instead cemented with soils on or close to the surface, combined with atmospheric and weather effects to form the outcrop. This is supported by many years of mineral exploration and drilling that found no gold or other minerals often associated with a gossan below the surface.

== Community activities ==
As well as providing public recreation space and walking trails, Gubur Dhaura remains an important site for cultural learning. The ACT government works closely with Aboriginal landcare groups for its conservation, while its heritage status protects against the removal of artefacts from the site. Events including tree-plantings and tours by Ngunnawal elders are routinely held here, including to mark National Reconciliation Week. It is a significant place that has hosted national delegations learning about traditional land management practices such as fire-stick farming.
