= Throsby, Australian Capital Territory =

Throsby
- Suburb
- Coordinates: 35°11′S 149°10′E
- Country: Australia
- State: Australian Capital Territory
- City: Canberra
- District: Gungahlin
- Location: 17 km (11 mi) NNE of Canberra CBD; 27 km (17 mi) NNW of Queanbeyan; 83 km (52 mi) SW of Goulburn; 280 km (170 mi) SW of Sydney

Government
  - Territory electorate: Yerrabi
  - Federal division: Fenner
- Elevation: 635 m (2,083 ft)

Population
  - Total: 2,405 (SAL 2021)
- Postcode: 2914
Suburbs around Throsby
Gungahlin	Throsby
Harrison	Kenny

Throsby is a designated suburb of Canberra, Australia in the district of Gungahlin. The suburb is adjacent to the suburbs of Kenny and Harrison and is bounded by the Federal Highway to the east, the ACT/NSW border to the north, Horse Park Drive to the south and the Goorooyarroo nature reserve to the east. The suburb is named after the explorer Charles Throsby who was one of the first Europeans to open up the lands west of the Blue Mountains to grazing and agriculture.

== Geography ==
The cleared part of the suburb has two arms, the east arm is the head of Sullivans Creek, and there is a larger northern arm. The high point of Throsby is 656 metres near 'Old Joe' Hill on the easterly arm. The low point of the suburb when it is built is 610 metres where the creek drains towards the east.

=== Geology ===
The rocks in Throsby are from the Canberra Formation, which is middle Silurian in age. The rocks are sedimentary shales and mudstones which have been modified by pressure and folding. The rock in the hills to the east (including Old Joe) is grey quartz andesite from the Ainslie Volcanics.

== Education ==
Throsby will have a public primary school catering for 123 preschool students, and 450 K-6 students. It is due to begin classes in 2022.

== See also ==
- Canberra District wine region
