= Peter Harrison (city planner) =

Peter Firman Harrison (21 October 1918 — 30 October 1990), town planner, was a champion of the Griffin Plan for Canberra and an influential advocate for the public interest in the development of Australia's national capital.

== Early career ==
Harrison grew up in Sydney during the Great Depression. Between 1934 and 1951, he undertook part-time architecture studies, before switching to town planning studies, while working as a draftsman at AGL, the Commonwealth Department of the Interior, Commonwealth Department of Works and Housing, and the Cumberland County Council. He was appointed senior lecturer in town planning at the University of Sydney in 1951. Harrison was a member of the Royal Australian Planning Institute committee which argued, in a submission to the Senate Select Committee on the Development of Canberra in 1955, that the Griffin Plan for the national capital should be adopted.

== Professional life in Canberra ==
The Menzies Government established the National Capital Development Commission (NCDC) in 1958 and, in early 1959, appointed Harrison its first Chief Town Planner. From that position, Harrison strongly advocated for development consistent with the Griffin Plan developed by Walter Burley Griffin. Harrison devised the 'Y plan', adopted by NCDC in 1967, which allowed for the expansion of Canberra consistent with the preservation of the open character of a city separated by bushland.

In 1967, Harrison was appointed Senior Research Fellow at the Urban Research Unit at the Australian National University (ANU) in Canberra. ANU Urban Research Unit colleague, Pat Troy, recalled one of Harrison's tools, in response to challenging planning proposals, was to apply the "mother test" — "Would my mother live in it?". Fellow Urban Research Unit colleague Max Neutze described Harrison's influence there as "pervasive", and many theses and publications produced by staff and students were influenced by him. "Peter believed strongly that large city centres were inefficient creations of speculative development," Neutze wrote. "He always insisted that development should serve the needs of people, not just line the pockets of investors."

Harrison was awarded a life fellowship of the Royal Australian Institute of Architects in 1971, which he resigned in 1990, in protest at the RAIA ACT Chapter's position on Canberra's development. He was appointed a Member of the Order of Australia (AM) in 1980, but he returned it in 1985 in protest against trends in Canberra's development. To the end he was a staunch advocate of the Griffin plan and intervened publicly to defend it.

Harrison died in Canberra on 30 October 1990. His papers are held at the National Library of Australia in Canberra. The Canberra suburb of Harrison, is named in his honour.

== Selected publications ==
- Harrison, Peter (1972). Post-war Planning in the Capital Cities of the Mainland States. Canberra: Metropolitan Research Trust. ISBN 978-0-909393-05-2. OCLC 27573745.
- Harrison, Peter; Freestone, Robert (1995). Walter Burley Griffin, Landscape Architect. Canberra: National Library of Australia. ISBN 978-0-642-10645-2. OCLC 33927983.
