= Ngunnawal–Gundungurra language =

Extinct Pama–Nyungan language of New South Wales and the ACT, Australia

Ngunawal–Gundungurra
- Burragorang, Northern Inland Yuin
- Onerwal
- Region: New South Wales and the ACT; Australia
- Ethnicity: Ngunnawal, Gandangara
- Native speakers: 80 (2014, Gundungurra) extinct by 1994 (Ngunnawal)
- Revival: revival efforts for both languages
- Language family: Pama–Nyungan: Yuin–Kuric; Yuin; Ngunawal–Gundungurra
- Dialects: Ngunawal/Ngunnawal; Gundungurra

Language codes
- ISO 639-3: Either: xul – Ngunawal xrd – Gundungurra
- Glottolog: nort2760
- AIATSIS: D3 Ngunawal/Ngunnawal, S60 Gundungurra
- ELP: Ngunawal; Gundungurra

Ngunnawal/Ngunawal and Gundungurra are Australian Aboriginal languages, and the traditional languages of the Ngunnawal and Gandangara. Ngunnawal and Gundungurra are very closely related and the two were most likely highly mutually intelligible. As such they can be considered dialects of a single unnamed language, but this is the technical linguistic usage of these terms and Ngunnawal and Gundungurra peoples prefer to describe their individual varieties as separate languages in their own right.

== Classification ==
Gundungurra/Ngunawal is generally classified to fall within the tentative (and perhaps geographic) Yuin–Kuric group of the Pama–Nyungan family.

== Geographical distribution ==
The traditional country of the Ngunnawal people is generally thought to have extended east near Goulburn, north to Boorowa, south through Canberra, perhaps even to Queanbeyan, and extending west to around the Goodradigbee River.

== Current status ==
The language was extinct by 1994. Some recordings of the last native speakers exist, but they did not bring their children up to speak the language. The Ngunnawal community has for some years been engaged in work to revive the language, aiming to bring it back into daily use within the community. They have been working with AIATSIS linguists to assist them with this work, and with identifying historical records that can be used.

== Phonology ==
Ngunawal consonants
	Labial	Apico- alveolar	Lamino- dental	Lamino- palatal	Dorso- velar
Stop	b	d	d̪	ɟ	g
Nasal	m	n	n̪	ɲ	ŋ
Trill		r			
Lateral		l		ʎ	
Approximant	w	ɹ		j	

- Retroflex sounds [ɖ, ɳ, ɭ] may have also been recorded in limited distribution.
- Stops /b, d, ɟ, ɡ/ may also be heard as voiceless [p, t, c, k] when in word-final or syllable-final positions.
- /ɹ/ may have also been heard as [ɻ].

Ngunawal vowels
	Front	Central	Back
High	i, iː		u, uː
Low		a, aː	

== Vocabulary ==
Ngunawal words and phrases and English translations
Ngunawal	English	Ref.
Balbo	Kangaroo rat	
Bamir	Long	
Bargang	Yellow box	
Berra	Boomerang	
Bimbi	Bird	
Bimbiang	Shield	
Bindugan	Mussel	
Birrigai	To laugh	
Budyan	Birds	
Bunburung	Small lizard	
Bunduluk	Rosella	
Bunima	Blow (as wind)	
Burrai	Quick	
Burrum-bah	Where the kangaroo, the wallaby, bounces over the rocks	
Bural	Day	
Burin	Stringybark	
Dhangarn	Food	
Daramoolen	Dreaming	
Darwa	A transition for ceremony	
Dulwa	Casuarina trees	
Dyindan	Ring-tail possum	
Galu	Crane	
Gamburra	Flowers	
Gang-gang	Gang-gang cockatoo	
Giliruk	pee wee	
Ginninderra	Sparkling light	
Ginin-ginin-derry	Sparkling, throwing out little rays of light (possibly a description of a waterfall)	
Gubbity	Pipeclay	
Gubur Dhaura	Red ochre ground	
Gudali	To hunt	
Guginya	Kookaburra	
Gula	Koala	
Gulwan	Younger sister	
Gummiuk	Bulrushes	
Gunyan	Slow	
Jedbinbilla	A place where boys become men	
Gurubun	Koala	
Kubbadang	Moon	
Karrugang	Magpie	
Kudyera	Fighting club	
Kanbarra	Meeting Place	
Madi	Very	
Mulleun	Eagle	
Mulunggang	Platypus	
Mundang	Canoe	
Mundawari	Bandicoot	
Munjuwa	Tracks, Foot	
Mura	Pathway	
Mura gadi	Pathways for searching	
Murra Bidgee Mullangari	Keeping the pathway to our ancestors alive	
Murrung	Lizard	
Nangi	To see or look	
Narragunnawali	Alive/well-being/coming together	
Nengi Bamir	See far (view)	
Ngadyung	Water	
Ngunna yerrabi yanggu	You're welcome to leave your footprints on our land	
Nguru	Camp	
Pajong	Ngunnawal clan group	
Tuggeranong	Cold place	
Umbagong	Axe	
Walga	Hawk	
Wallabalooa	Ngunnawal clan group	
Warabin	Curlew	
Warrumbul	Youth	
Weereewa	Lake George (translates roughly to "bad water")	
Wimbaliri	Drink	
Winnunga nimmityjah	Strong health	
Winyu	Sun	
Wirria	Tree goanna	
Woggabaliri	Play	
Wolway	Waterfall	
Yarrh	Running water	
Yeal-am-bid-gie	Molonglo River	
Yerra	Swim, to fly like a bird	
Yerrabi	To walk	
Yerradhang	Eucalyptus Tree	
Yukkumbruk	Black Crow	
Yumba	Eel	
Yuyu	Mopoke	

More words are compiled in The Wiradyuri and Other Languages of New South Wales, an article by Robert H. Mathews first published in the Journal of the Royal Anthropological Institute in 1904.
