= Franklin, Australian Capital Territory =

Franklin
- Suburb
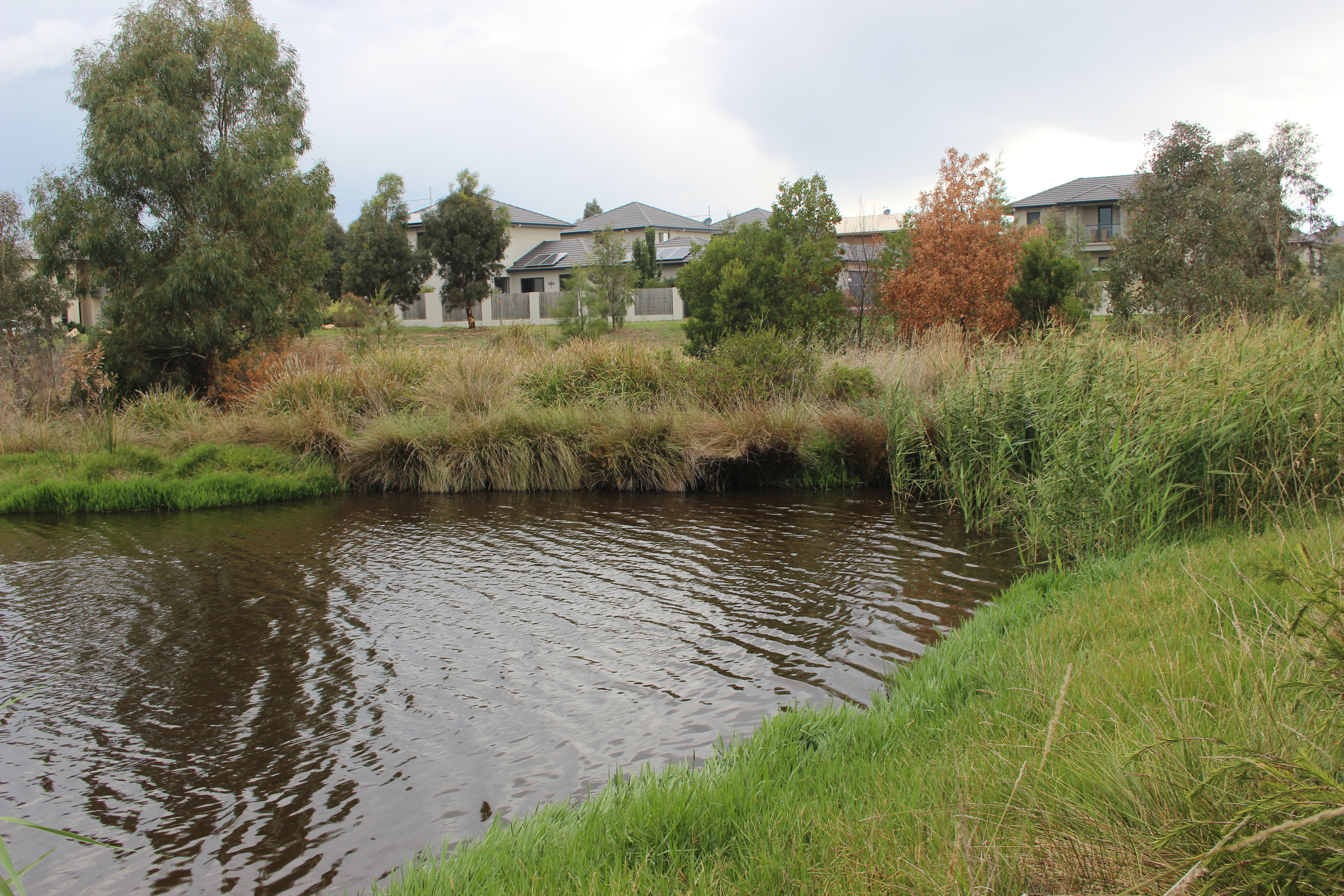
- Franklin wetlands

- Coordinates: 35°12′00″S 149°08′33″E
- Country: Australia
- State: Australian Capital Territory
- City: Canberra
- District: Gungahlin
- Location: 11 km (6.8 mi) NNW of Canberra CBD; 28 km (17 mi) NNW of Queanbeyan; 85 km (53 mi) SW of Goulburn; 282 km (175 mi) SW of Sydney
- Established: 2007

Government
  - Territory electorate: Yerrabi
  - Federal division: Fenner

Area
  - Total: 2.3 km^{2} (0.89 sq mi)
- Elevation: 611 m (2,005 ft)

Population
  - Total: 7,484 (SAL 2021)
- Postcode: 2913
Suburbs around Franklin
Palmerston	Gungahlin	Harrison
Canberra Nature Park	Franklin	Harrison
Crace	Mitchell	Kenny

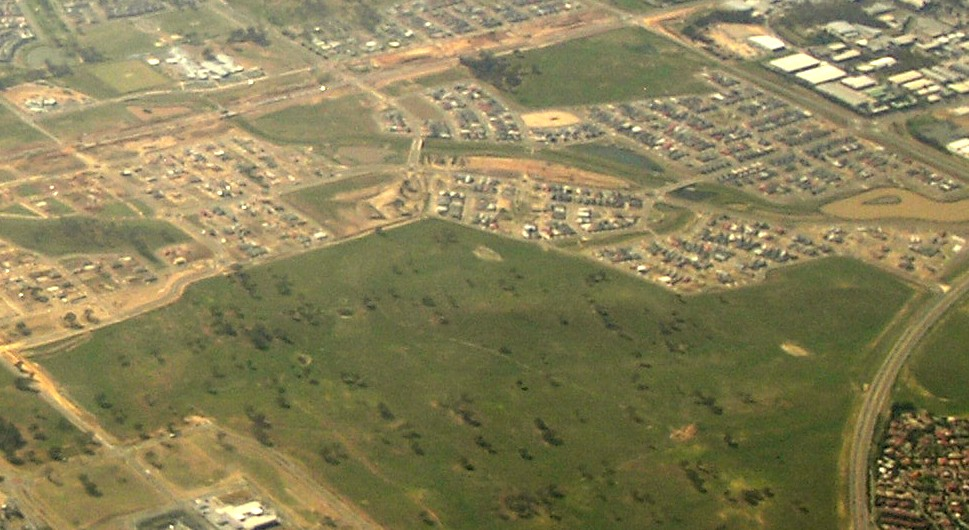
Aerial view from north west in November 2009

Franklin is a suburb of Canberra, Australia in the district of Gungahlin. It is named after the novelist Miles Franklin. Most streets in Franklin are named after female Australian writers. It comprises an area of approximately 256 hectares. It is bounded by Flemington Road to the north and east, Well Station Drive to the south, and Gungahlin Drive to the west. Franklin is mainly a residential area with higher density, mixed-use development along Flemington Road including a local shopping centre and other retail and commercial tenancies.

In 2016, Franklin was recognised with the UrbanGrowth NSW Award for Best Master Planned Community by the Property Council of Australia.

== Open space ==
The suburb of Franklin includes a number of large open spaces, linked by pedestrian and cyclist networks. These provide an ecological corridor for the movement of native wildlife and preserve the area's history.

- The Gubur Dhaura Heritage Park provides 360° views of the surrounding landscape and an ochre quarry site which are of cultural significance to the Ngunnawal people. Remains of the Red Hill pipeclay mine, Old Well Station Track and historical markers can also be found here;
- The Mulangarri and North Mitchell Grasslands;
- The Gungaderra Creek;
- Old Well Station Track which connects the Well Station Heritage Precinct (located in the neighbouring suburb of Harrison) with the Gungaderra Homestead, and Gubur Dhaura Red Hill Heritage Site through to the Gungahlin Town Centre.

== Demographics ==
In the 2021 census, the population of Franklin was 7,484, of these 50.6% were male and 49.4% were female. Aboriginal and Torres Strait Islander people made up 1.5% of the population, which was lower than the national and territory averages. The median age of Franklin residents was 30 years old, which was significantly lower than the national average of 38 years old. The most common ancestries in Franklin were Australian (19.6%), English (17.6%), Chinese (15.4%), Indian (9.6%) and Irish (5.4%). Most people in Franklin were born in Australia (47%), China (9.2%), India (8.6%), Nepal (5.1%), Vietnam (2.4%) and South Korea (2.2%).

The religious affiliation of most Franklin residents was no religion (38.9%), Hinduism (13.7%), Catholic (13.3%), Islam (7.2%) and Buddhism (5.9%).

== Transport ==
=== Light rail ===
Franklin is served by three Canberra Metro light rail stations: Manning Clark North, Mapleton Avenue and Nullarbor Avenue. All three stations are located on Flemington Road and opened in April 2019.

=== Buses ===
Franklin is serviced by several ACTION bus routes. Route 18 passes through the north of the suburb, while routes 21 and 22 provide connections through the south.

== Geology ==
Franklin is underlaid mostly by the Canberra Formation mudstone or volcanics from the late middle Silurian age.

== Education ==
Franklin residents get preference for:

- Franklin Early Childhood School
- A shared PEA of Harrison School and Palmerston District Primary
- Harrison School
- Gungahlin College
