= Australian Capital Territory Heritage Register =

The Australian Capital Territory Heritage Register, also known as Heritage Register ACT was established by the Heritage Act 2004 (Heritage Act) to empower the ACT Heritage Council to record and preserve places and objects within the Australian Capital Territory. Its predecessor from 1979 to 2004 was the National Trust ACT.

Australia has both state and national heritage registers. As of 2019, there were 415 items on the list at the Territory level and 83 at the Federal level.
