= Mitchell, Australian Capital Territory =

Mitchell
- Suburb
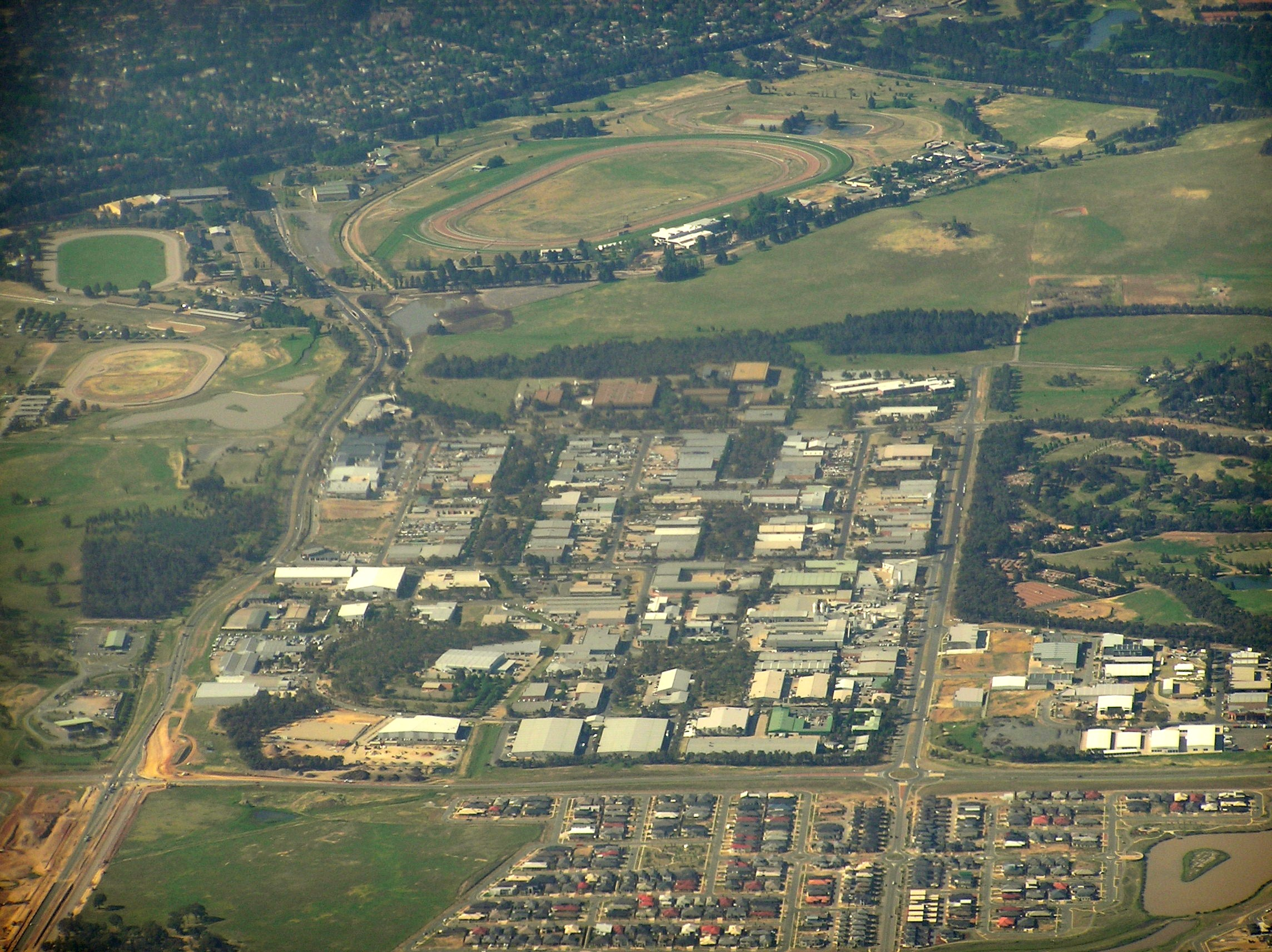
- Mitchell viewed from the north

- Coordinates: 35°13′09″S 149°08′06″E
- Country: Australia
- State: Australian Capital Territory
- City: Canberra
- District: Gungahlin
- Location: 8 km (5.0 mi) N of Canberra CBD; 28 km (17 mi) NNW of Queanbeyan; 84 km (52 mi) SW of Goulburn; 281 km (175 mi) SW of Sydney

Government
  - Territory electorate: Yerrabi
  - Federal division: Fenner

Area
  - Total: 7.4 km^{2} (2.9 sq mi)
- Elevation: 593 m (1,946 ft)

Population
  - Total: 7 (SAL 2021)
- Postcode: 2911
Suburbs around Mitchell
Franklin	Franklin	Harrison
Kaleen	Mitchell	Kenny
Kaleen	Lyneham

Mitchell (postcode: 2911) is a light-industrial estate of Canberra, Australia in the district of Gungahlin. Mitchell was named in honour of Major Sir Thomas Livingstone Mitchell, an explorer of inland New South Wales and Surveyor-General of New South Wales. The streets in Mitchell are named after Australian industrialists.

In the 2016 census, Mitchell had no recorded population.

It is commonly believed by Canberra residents that the suburb of Mitchell contains Exhibition Park in Canberra (EPIC) and also Thoroughbred Park (Canberra Racecourse). In fact, these facilities are located in the neighbouring suburb of Lyneham.

Mitchell is one of the two areas in Canberra where brothels may legally operate, along with Fyshwick. Mitchell also has other adult entertainment industry shops and one strip club.

== History ==
A major fire at a chemical factory on Dacre Street early in the morning of 16 September 2011 saw a 10 kilometre exclusion zone put in place around the suburb. Residents in parts of Gungahlin, Belconnen and North Canberra were told to remain inside with windows their closed and schools inside the zone closed for the day. Around 100 people and 50 horses were evacuated from an event at nearby EPIC due to toxic smoke.

Mitchell was selected as the site for the first Canberra light rail depot, with construction beginning in 2016. The facility opened in March 2019, including maintenance facilities and the network operations centre. Despite this, a passenger stop in Mitchell was not constructed as part of stage one of the project, with the ACT Government sighting low projected passenger numbers. Following lobbying efforts by local businesses and the community, the ACT Government later supported construction of the Sandford Street station which opened to passengers in September 2021.

== Geology ==
Rocks under Mitchell are from the Silurian age. Mitchell is built over calcareous shale of the Canberra Formation. From the south to Crace Hill is green-grey to reddish dacite.
