= History of Canberra =

History of the capital of Australia

The history of Canberra details the development of the city of Canberra from the time before European settlement to the city's planning by the Chicago architect Walter Burley Griffin in collaboration with Marion Mahony Griffin, and its subsequent development to the present day.

== Pre-colonisation-history ==
Before European settlement, the area which eventually became the Australian Capital Territory was inhabited by Indigenous Australians, who spoke a Ngarigo dialect. Historical sources have identified them as different tribes with a range of names. Archaeological evidence of settlement in the region includes inhabited rock shelters, rock paintings and engravings, burial places, camps and quarry sites, and stone tools and arrangements. The evidence suggests human habitation in the area for at least 21,000 years.

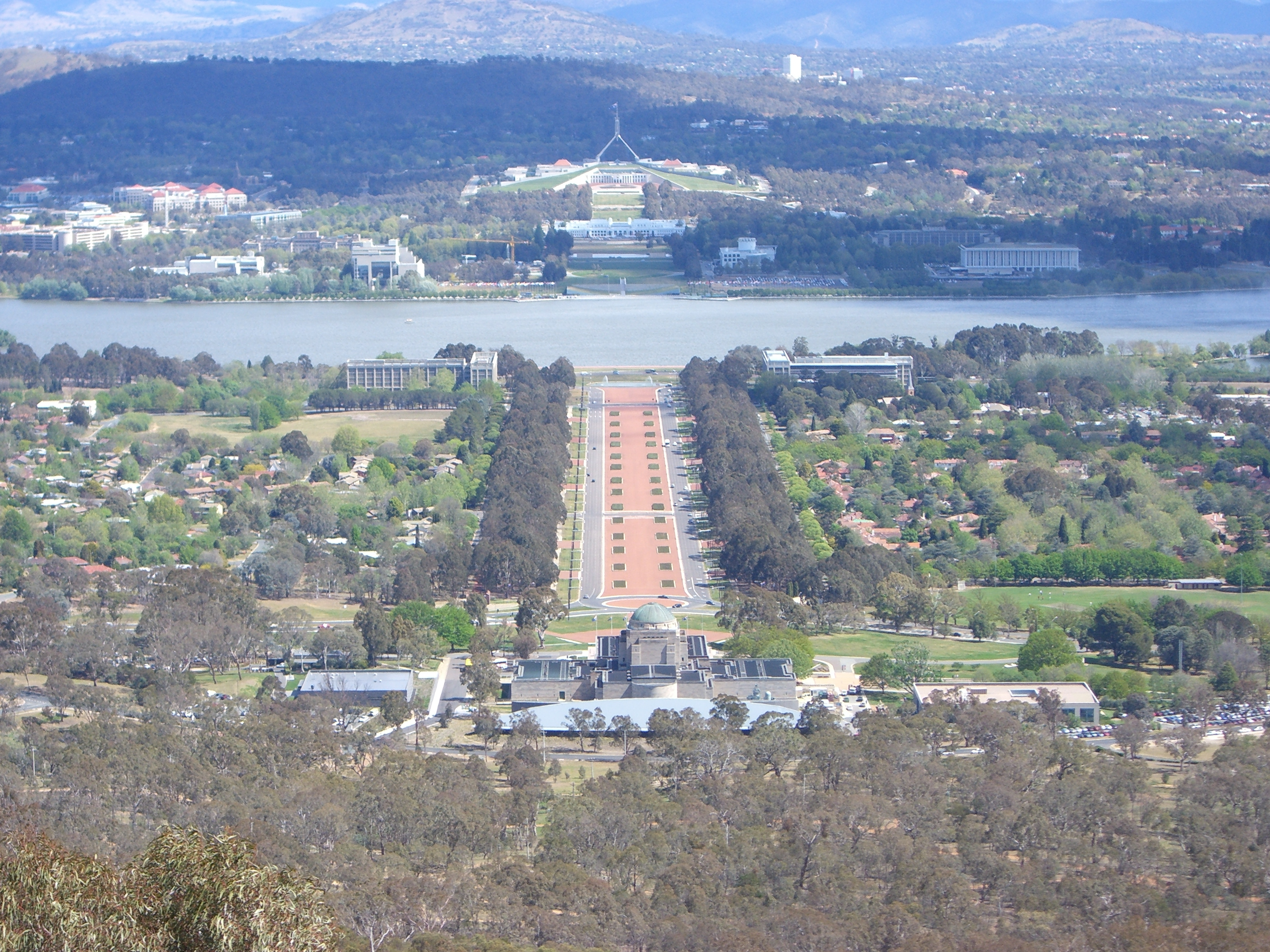
Canberra from Mount Ainslie with Parliament House and Old Parliament House in the background

European exploration began within the Canberra area as early as the 1820s. Canberra was discovered by Europeans on 7 December 1820, by Charles Throsby Smith, Joseph Wild and James Vaughan. Four successive expeditions whose routes took in the Canberra area were those of Charles Throsby in October 1820, Charles Throsby Smith in December 1820, Major John Ovens and Captain Mark Currie in 1823, and Allan Cunningham in 1824. All four expeditions explored the course of the Limestone (now Molonglo River) that is now the site of Lake Burley Griffin. Smith and Cunningham also penetrated further south, into what is now called the Tuggeranong Valley.

It was estimated by Robertson that prior to European settlement starting in 1824, depending on the season there were about 300-400 Aboriginals living in the Molonglo, Queanbeyan, Canberra, Namadgi region. As the settlers took over land, many Aboriginals migrated to other districts such as Cooma and Tumut. The population was also significantly reduced when the death rate increased significantly due to diseases introduced by the Europeans. By the 1880s there were no full-blood people in the district, with only some fifty mixed race people. These people were employed either as labourers or domestics on stations. Due to the lack of European women, many white men had relationships with mixed race women so even further diluting Aboriginal heritage.

The 2013 ACT Government report "Our Kin Our Country" on the connection to the area by present-day ACT Aboriginal inhabitants, concluded:

Therefore there appears to be no surviving traditional knowledge of lore, language, custom, kinship structures, oral history and genealogy associated directly with the ACT which would form the basis of a connection report. ... the historical record of Aboriginal culture and populations is very scant and contradictory, it was recognised that it would not be possible to prepare a full 'connection to country' report linking present-day people through their families and surviving traditional knowledge to the past land holding groups.

=== European settlement ===
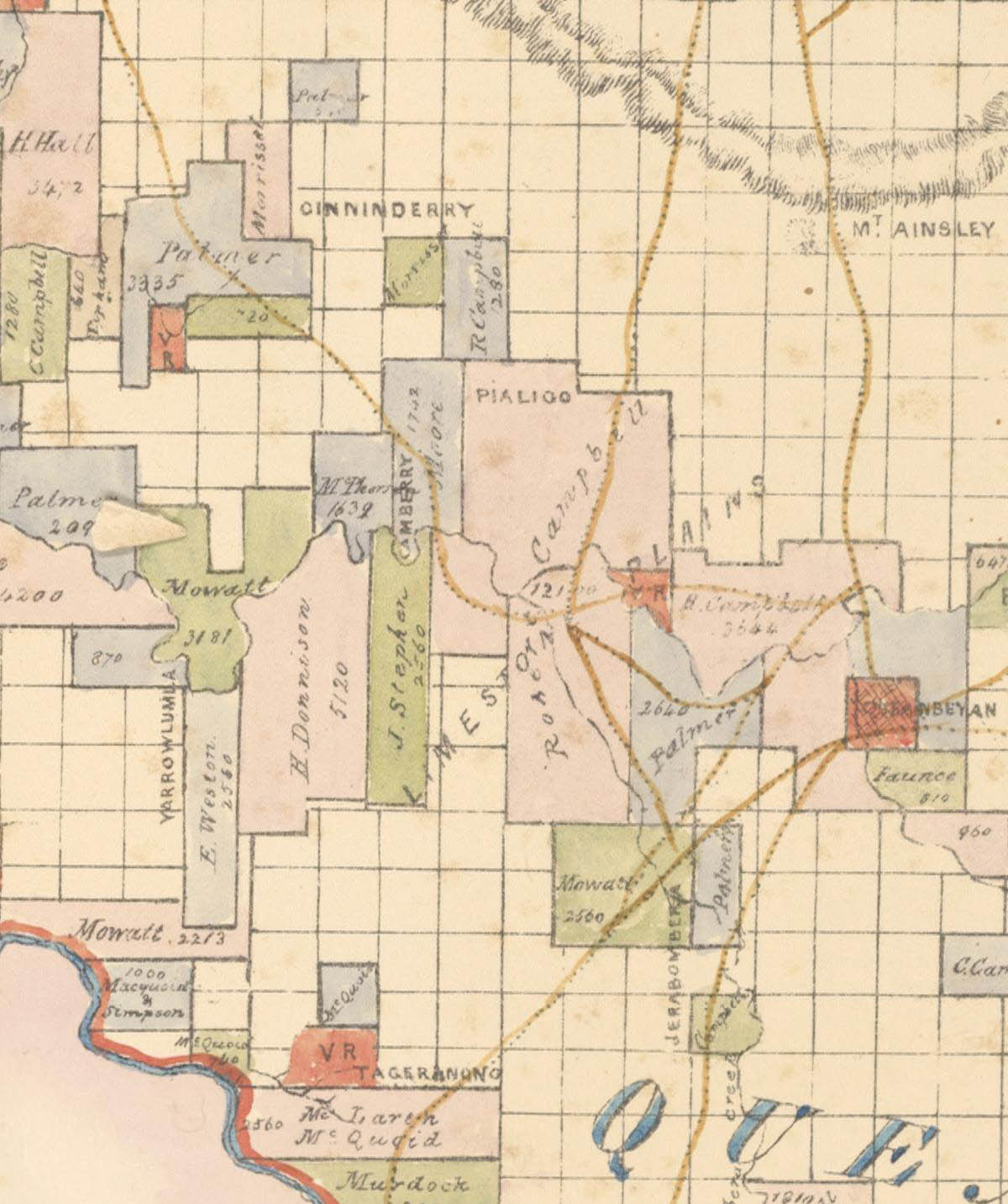
Map of the Canberra area 1843–1846 showing "Camberry", "Yarrowlumla", "Tageranong" and other names similar to modern names

The Molonglo River was recorded as the "Yeal-am-bid-gie" in 1820 by the explorer Charles Throsby. Later it was referred to as the Limestone River, and the Fish River. The Moolinggolah people of the district around Captains Flat probably gave the Molonglo its current name.

European settlement in the area began in October 1824 when Joshua John Moore, the owner of Horningsea near Liverpool, was given a "ticket of occupation" for 2,000 acres (810 ha) north of the Limestone River covering the area now called Civic extending north to Dickson. A flock of sheep was driven onto the property in December 1824 by the overseer John McLaughlin. He built a slab hut on what is now called Acton Peninsula. This was named Camberry later Canberry Cottage. A creek that ran through the middle of the property originating from the side of Mount Ainslie was named Canberry Creek. On 12 October 1828, a deed for a further 1,000 acres (400 ha) to the west was issued to Moore in consideration of £250. Moore was always an absentee landlord and took no interest in running the property. The station continued to be called Canberry/Camberry, from 1824 until 1843 when it was sold to Arthur Jeffreys, who renamed it Acton and built a more substantial homestead called Acton House.

In 1825 James Ainslie, a purported Waterloo veteran, herded sheep down to the district for Robert Campbell. He occupied land at the base of Mount Pleasant near the Limestone River, which he called "Pialigo". A stone cottage was built, Limestone Cottage, which later was expanded to become Duntroon House and the property named Duntroon when the Campbells took up residence and acquired land extending down to Queanbeyan. Ainslie, who remained there till 1835, also received a grant of 100 acres (40 ha) for assisting in the capture of two bushrangers Tennant and Dublin Jack. Ainslie later returned to Scotland.

In 1827 John McPherson was given a ticket of occupation for the land to the west of Canberry extending to include the now named Black Mountain. He called the station Springbank, with the homestead just to the east of the junction of the Limestone River with Canberry Creek. The first white child born in the area was a daughter, born into the Macpherson family in 1830. In 1831 MacPherson was granted title to the 640-acre (260 ha) property extending to the now named Black Mountain. Other sheep stations were built in turn by further settlers. Initially, these properties were owned by absentee landlords, but later resident families moved in. For future development, blocks for village settlements were gazetted at Pialigo, Tageranong to the south, Palmerstone to the north, and Yarrolumla to the west near the Murrumbidgee River.

The local Aboriginals of this time tended to refer to themselves as the Nyamudy people and spoke a dialect of the Ngarigo language, while the settlers called them the Limestone Plains Blacks or Pialigo Mob. The indigenous population of the district declined to less than a hundred by 1840. In stark comparison, by 1851 there were about 2,500 European people living in the area. Apart from a few employed on stations Aboriginals disappeared by the 1860s with most moving to the better hunting grounds of land near the Cooma and Tumut districts. A few from the Sutton, Hall and Fairlight localities moved north to Yass.

Construction of the church of St John the Baptist started in 1841 on land purchased from Robert Campbell adjacent to the Canberry station. This included a 100-acre (40 ha) glebe. When the first rector was appointed the rectory was the rented Canberry Cottage, thus the church was referred to as being at Canberry in the parish of Queanbeyan. Later the lands south of the Limestone River were also called Canberry extending down to Canberry Hill, now Red Hill, with the road going over Church Crossing.

When the district was further divided into parishes in the County of Murray, the name given of the parish was Canberry, but was then changed to Canberra. It extended over a wide area north nearly to Yass and west to the Cotter River

There were a number of European families who achieved status in the area. These included the Campbell family and the Palmer family. In the late 1820s and early 1830s, there was a conflict between two of these families – the Johnstons (descended from Major George Johnston who was involved in the Rum Rebellion) and the Martins – for the ownership and financial control of land that is now known as Weston Creek and Tuggeranong.

Prominent, too, in the early life of the district were the Gibbes and Murray families, who were related by marriage.

Irish-born Sir Terence Aubrey Murray, MLC, owned the Yarralumla estate (now the site of Australia's Government House) from 1837 until 1859. In the latter year, Murray sold Yarralumla to his brother-in-law, Augustus Onslow Manby Gibbes, who was joined at the property by his elderly parents, Elizabeth Gibbes and Colonel John George Nathaniel Gibbes, the retired Collector of Customs for NSW. Augustus Gibbes made improvements to the estate and he remained Yarralumla's resident proprietor until 1881 when he sold it to his neighbour Frederick Campbell. (Note: For detailed information about 19th-century Yarralumla and the surrounding district, see the Canberra Historical Journal, New Series, Number 48, September 2001, pp. 11–31, ISSN 0313-5977.)

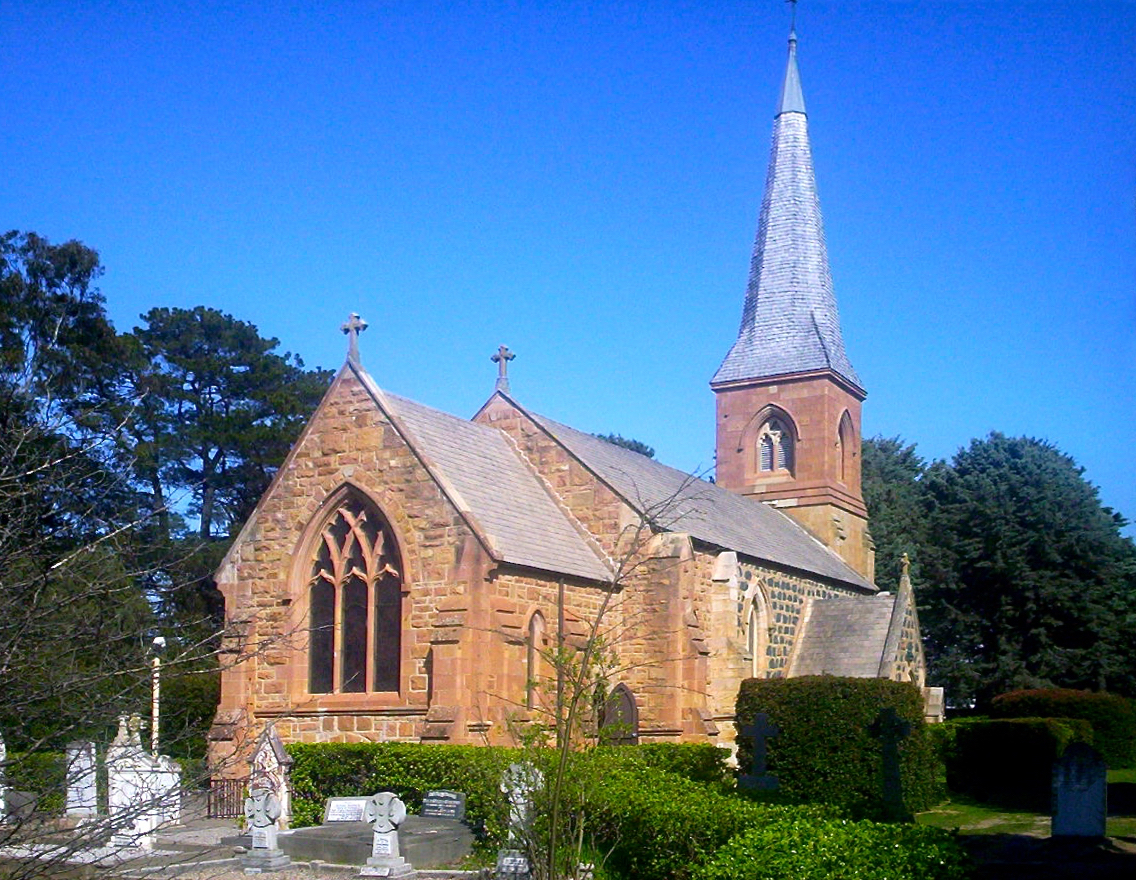
The first church in Canberra, St John's, in the suburb of Reid

The Campbells, and their patriarch, Robert Campbell, were a particularly influential group in the area's early history. The Campbells were Scottish and brought many other Scots to the district as workers. The land that they owned included Duntroon House that is now the Officers Mess at the Royal Military College, Duntroon, Yarralumla and the Oaks Estate. The latter most got its name from a mansion built there by Campbell called the Oaks. When the Campbell family later sold the land it was on for subdivision and development, it was on condition that the Oaks and the land that it to remain intact and not be renamed. There are still members of the Campbell family living in Canberra.

The European population in the Canberra area continued to slowly grow throughout the rest of the 19th century. One prominent building, the Anglican St John's Church, was consecrated and opened for use in 1845. This building still stands today and its graveyard holds the burials of many of Canberra's 19th-century pioneers. A schoolhouse was also attached to this building. By 1851, there were about 2,500 people living in the area – a vast majority of which were stockmen. Some assigned convict labour was also used in this area during the 1830s and 1840s. The weather in the area was said to be harsh, with frosty winters and fierce hail-storm episodes, and drownings in local watercourses were a fairly common occurrence. The drowning victims included the first rector of the Anglican Church of St John the Baptist, which was Canberra's first purpose-built place of worship.

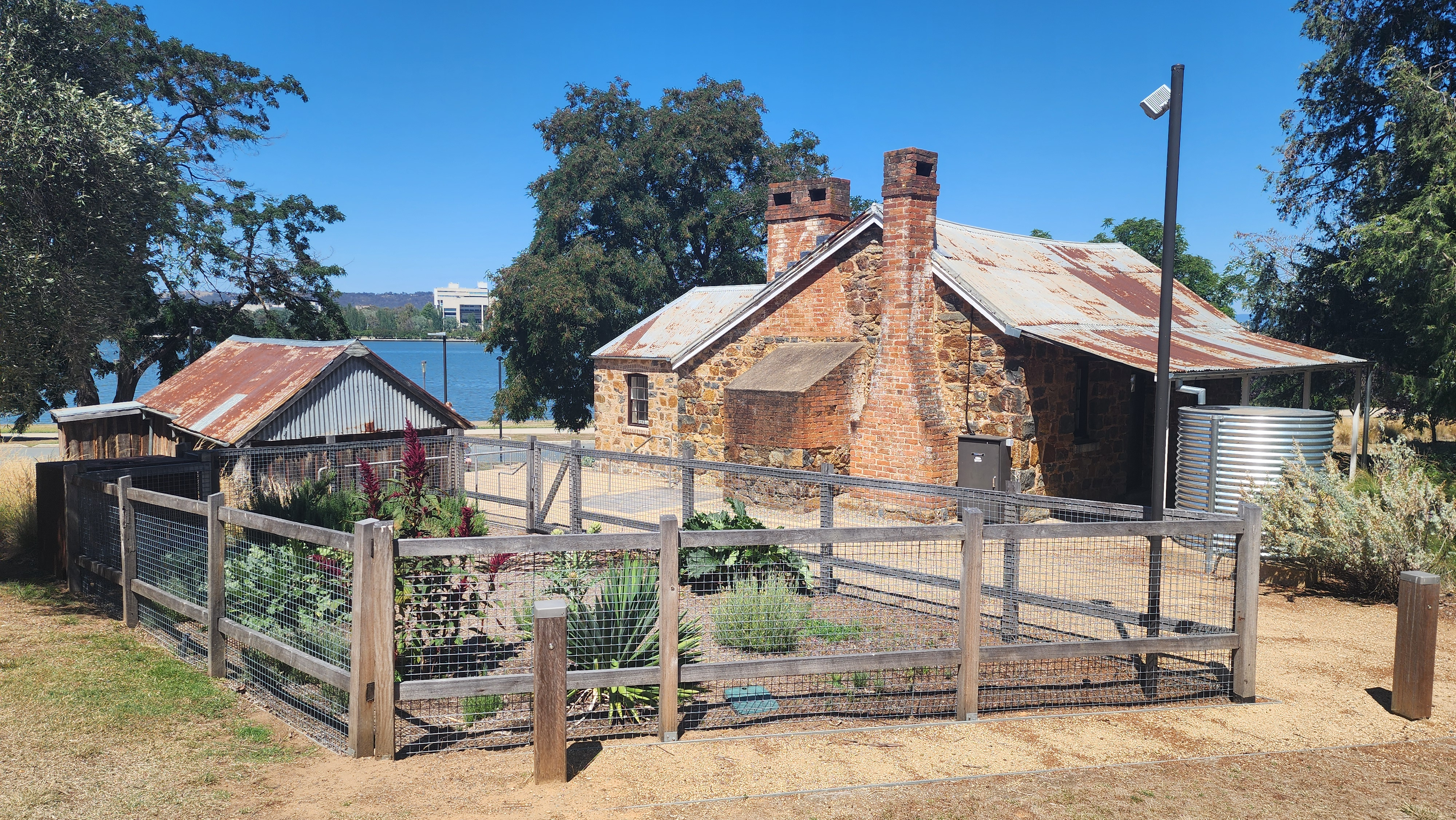
Blundells Cottage, built in the 1860s

Blundells' Cottage was built in 1859 for William Ginn, the head ploughman for the Duntroon Estate. The cottage's second occupants where newlyweds George and Flora Blundell, after whom the cottage was named.

The area's Aboriginal population dwindled as the European presence increased, mainly due to the impact of diseases such as smallpox and measles. Another reason for the shrinking Aboriginal population base was that their ability to hunt, and therefore survive, was impeded by homesteads being placed on traditional hunting grounds. By 1862, the remnant Aboriginal People were mainly of mixed European and indigenous blood. They held their last full corroboree by the Molonglo River in that year. Aboriginal culture and its people had largely ceased to exist in the region, with its members largely absorbed into the European mainstream by 1878 as a consequence of inter-marriage. "Queen Nellie" Hamilton, a Ngarigo Woman who had been married to a Ngambri Man, Bobby Hamilton, is said to have been the last full-blood Aboriginal Person dwelling in the environs of Canberra during the 19th century. She died in the nearby town of Queanbeyan in 1897.

== 20th century ==
=== Creation of the Australian Capital Territory ===
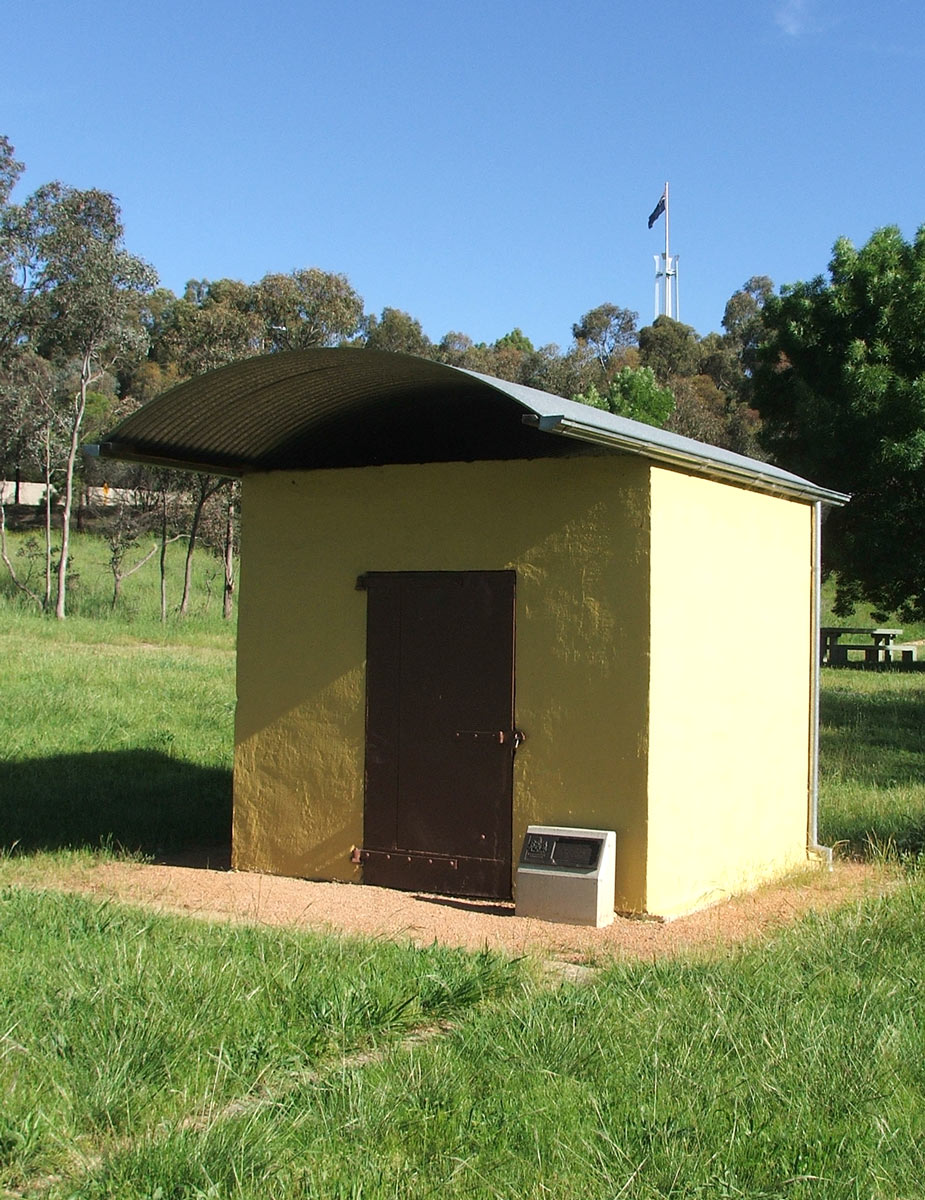
A surveyor's hut, dating from 1909

The district's transformation from a New South Wales rural area to a built-up national capital began during political debates over Federation in the late 19th century. Due to the Victorian gold rush, Melbourne was Australia's largest city and a potential place for the capital. However Sydney was Australia's oldest city, and so also had a justifiable claim to host the new nation's Federal polity. Western Australia, South Australia and Victoria, Melbourne's state of location —supported Melbourne. However, New South Wales (the largest colony) and its neighbouring northern state, Queensland, favoured Sydney. Perhaps one or another of the two colonial capitals might have eventually been acceptable to the smaller states, but the Sydney–Melbourne rivalry was such that neither city would ever agree to the other one becoming the capital.

Eventually, a compromise was reached: Melbourne would be the capital on a temporary basis while a new capital was built somewhere between Sydney and Melbourne. As Victoria was relatively small in geographical area, Section 125 of the Constitution specified that the capital must be placed in a Commonwealth territory within New South Wales but at least 100 miles (160 km) from Sydney. Various Commonwealth governmental bodies continued to operate principally from Sydney or Melbourne after 1927. Most civil service departments were moved to Canberra in the 1950s, and the High Court of Australia was finally moved from Melbourne to Canberra in 1980.

After an extensive search, the present site, about 300 kilometres (190 mi) south-west of Sydney, in the foothills of the Australian Alps, was chosen in 1908 as a result of survey work done by the government surveyor Charles Scrivener in that year. Two people who campaigned strongly for the Federal capital to be in the Canberra area were John Gale, the publisher of The Queanbeyan Age and Federal politician King O'Malley. The choice of site was a disputed one, and narrowly beat Dalgety, a small town near the NSW/Victoria border.

The new Federal Capital Territory (later named Australian Capital Territory) was created on 1 January 1911 when the NSW government ceded 2,360 square kilometres of land including the seaport of Jervis Bay to the Commonwealth Government. In that same year, the ACT became an alcohol-free area as a result of legislation that the Minister for Home Affairs, King O'Malley, steered through the Federal Parliament in Melbourne. This era of prohibition is commemorated today in the form of a pub named after O'Malley that was established in the city centre of Canberra in 2000.

An international competition was held in 1911 by O'Malley to select a design for the layout of the capital city. An American architect, Walter Burley Griffin, won the competition in 1913. Although submitted in Walter's name, the plan was actually designed collaboratively with his architect wife and professional partner Marion Mahony Griffin. His idea was to divide the proposed city into halves, using a lake as a dividing point. The two resulting sections were to be designated the civilisation part and the governmental part. A variety of names were suggested for the capital, including Olympus, Paradise, Captain Cook, Shakespeare, Kangaremu, Sydmeladperho, Eucalypta and Myola. Myola was the personal favourite of the prime minister, Andrew Fisher. However, when Billy Hughes was told of his preference, he said, "It sounds like the last despairing cry of an Italian prostitute".

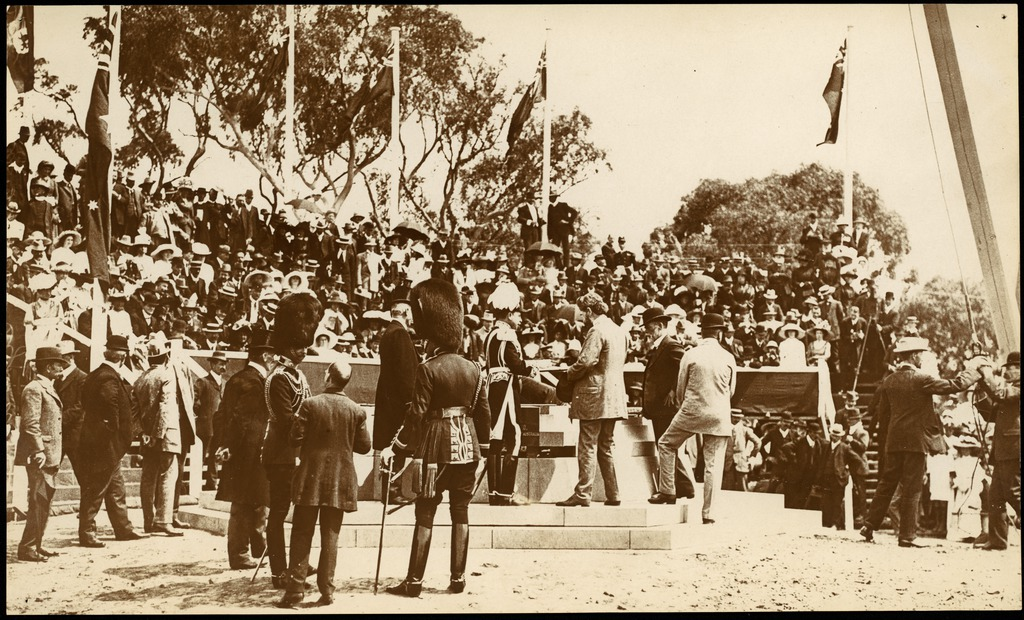
Lord Denman, naming of Canberra ceremony 12 March 1913

The name of Canberra was eventually settled upon. At midday on 12 March 1913, the city was officially given this name by Lady Denman, at a ceremony on Kurrajong Hill (now known as Capital Hill). This historic occasion was officiated over by the Australian Prime Minister, Andrew Fisher. The city now commemorates the event as "Canberra Day" each year, always on the second Monday of March.

=== The name Canberra ===
The name Canberra was given to the planned city as the central area was in the parish of Canberra. The area originally had been in the parish of Queanbeyan, but in 1850 a separate parish was established with St John the Baptist being the parish church. According to church records, land was purchased from the Campbell property to build the church and establish a 100-acre (40 ha) glebe. The parsonage was "Canberry Cottage", the rented original building on the adjacent property called Acton but originally called Camberry from 1825 until 1843. The flat land on either side of the Molonglo River near the church was referred to as the Canberry Plain while the road south went over a ford called Church Crossing. To the south of the plain was Canberra Hill, now Red Hill. Finally by 1865 the location of St Johns Church started to be spelt Canberra by the rector, Pierce Galliard Smith, against the wishes of Robert Campbell the original owner of the land on which the church was built, and who provided much of the financial cost for constructing the church and adjacent school house.

However, substantive information on the reason for the original choice of the name Camberry, or why the spelling changed, is non-existent. The dispute over the derivation has been going on for over a hundred years without resolution. It has been the subject of numerous contradictory learned academic papers, and letters/articles in the press.

There are numerous unsubstantiated theories put forward for the derivation of the name for the riverside property "Camberry Station" from English sources. First, it was due to the profusion of the wild raspberry bushes growing there. Second, the raspberry bushes were actually Cranberry bushes. Third, a St. John's church history said the church location was named after the district of Canbury in Kingston upon Thames in England, while other sources suggest Canberry in north London and Canbury in Kent. There is also a theory the original intention was to name it Camberry after the River Cam, and Cambridge where the original owner came from.

There are numerous unsubstantiated theories put forward for the derivation being from an Aboriginal source. These include that the word Canberra is derived from the rendition into written English of the Aboriginal name Ngambri, which allegedly was the name of a small camp site north of the Molonglo river on the side of Black Mountain, which subsequently became part of the pastoral property "Springbank". There are five non-evidenced theories for the latter; that it was an Aboriginal word meaning alternatively "meeting place", "neutral place", "corroboree ground", the "head of the river", the "space between a woman's breasts", or after the bird kookaburra or "laughing jackass". There is also a dispute whether this Aboriginal word came from the Ngarigu, Nyamudy, Kamilroi, Walgalu or Wiradhari language. Academic reconstruction of the various pronunciations by different Europeans results in a theoretical Aboriginal name for a Black Mountain peninsular camp site as Ng-aan-bira, of unknown or no meaning, in the local Nyamudy peoples dialect of the Ngarigu language. However, there is no contemporary recorded Aboriginal use of the word until after the name Canberry was used for the area around St John the Baptists Church.

The Molonglo River was recorded as the "Yeal-am-bid-gie" in 1820 by the explorer Charles Throsby. Later it was referred to as the Limestone River, and the Fish River. The Moolinggolah people of the district around Captains Flat probably gave the Molonglo its current name.

=== The Griffins' design for Canberra ===
==== The picturesque ====
Following the federation of Australia on 1 January 1901 and the eventual selection of the Australian Capital Territory to accommodate a capital city in 1908, Surveyor Charles Scrivener was responsible for locating the city's specific site. Scrivener's selection was guided by instructions to assess sites from "a scenic standpoint, with a view to securing the picturesque, and with the object of beautification". Hence from the outset, in accordance with Renaissance fashion in Britain, emphasis was placed on the picturesque, that is utilising the intrinsic beauty of the natural world, and affirmed that the future capital's landscaping and aesthetics would be just as important as its functionality.

Prior to the selection of the site, Congress delegate Isaac Evans wrote a paper, "A Waterside Federal Capital", which, despite being written to advocate a different site altogether, identified large bodies of water as improving the appearance and perspective of the city's form. Similarly, the design criteria for the capital encouraged such a creation. Furthermore, Evans also romantically described the future capital's dwellings as "dotted amongst the foliage", implying that Evans envisioned a picturesque capital representative of the wider view of Australian society whose relatively new population were beginning to identify with the iconic surroundings of the Australian outback.

Consequently, this enabled the picturesque site to act as a proxy for the "Old World's" culture, relics, and established nature which the young colony innately lacked. By continuing to build upon this forming identity, a picturesque capital would "obscure the nation's youth and…register its membership within the British Empire". Hence, although Canberra is undoubtedly Australian with respect to its landscaping and wider location, the underlying motivations for these aspects "remained colonial" and "rooted" in the "Old World".

==== Design and influences ====
Utilising and capturing the picturesque of the landscape was essential to the success of the Griffins' design and was achieved by integrating the territory's topography into their design rather than designing to avoid it. An example of this is the Molonglo Valley, which was utilised as a position for an artificial, grand central lake which satisfied part of the design criteria (Lake Burley Griffin). With respect to capturing the picturesque, Griffin's lake centrepiece was a selling point of their design. It is likely that the Griffins were familiar with, and influenced by, the work of fellow Chicagoan Daniel Burnham, whose 1909 Plan of Chicago, also known as the Burnham Plan, focussed on reclaiming and improving Chicago's lakefront for public enjoyment.

Another significant design point was that the city itself was nestled in between Mount Ainslie and Mount Bimberi and used their collective picturesque amenity as visual foci for the street layout and to convey civic power. Hence, the Griffins aligned democracy with the most powerful force of all: nature. Consequentially, given it was so severely overshadowed, the traditional methodology of using grand architecture to convey power was rendered less significant. This approach was strongly influenced by Pierre Charles L’Enfant's 1792 design for Washington, D.C. L’Enfant's design included wide, tree-lined avenues that would visually connect significant topographical sites over the city. He therefore drew on the picturesque by ensuring views of the landscape and notably the wilderness of the unchartered west, which beckoned "[American] democracy's westward expansion."

The Griffins' also capitalised on an emerging theme within the new colony which recognised the bush, referring to the country's extensive native vegetation, as a national identity. Critical to the success of the Griffins' design was their use of gold and sepia which contrasted other entries that depicted a lush, green capital. The Griffins' approach better represented Australia's unique conditions and, more importantly, celebrated them.

Finally, Washington, D.C. also offered another influence for the Griffins with respect to Burnham's 1902 McMillan Plan for the city. Although the Griffins were predominantly influenced by pre-modern planning, notably L’Enfant's inspired emphasis on the picturesque, they achieved this emphasis through well-orchestrated geometric street organisation representative of the contemporary City Beautiful movement. The movement was strongly implemented in the McMillan Plan, which in turn inspired Canberra's grand axes, views, and effective central focal point.

=== Development and growth ===
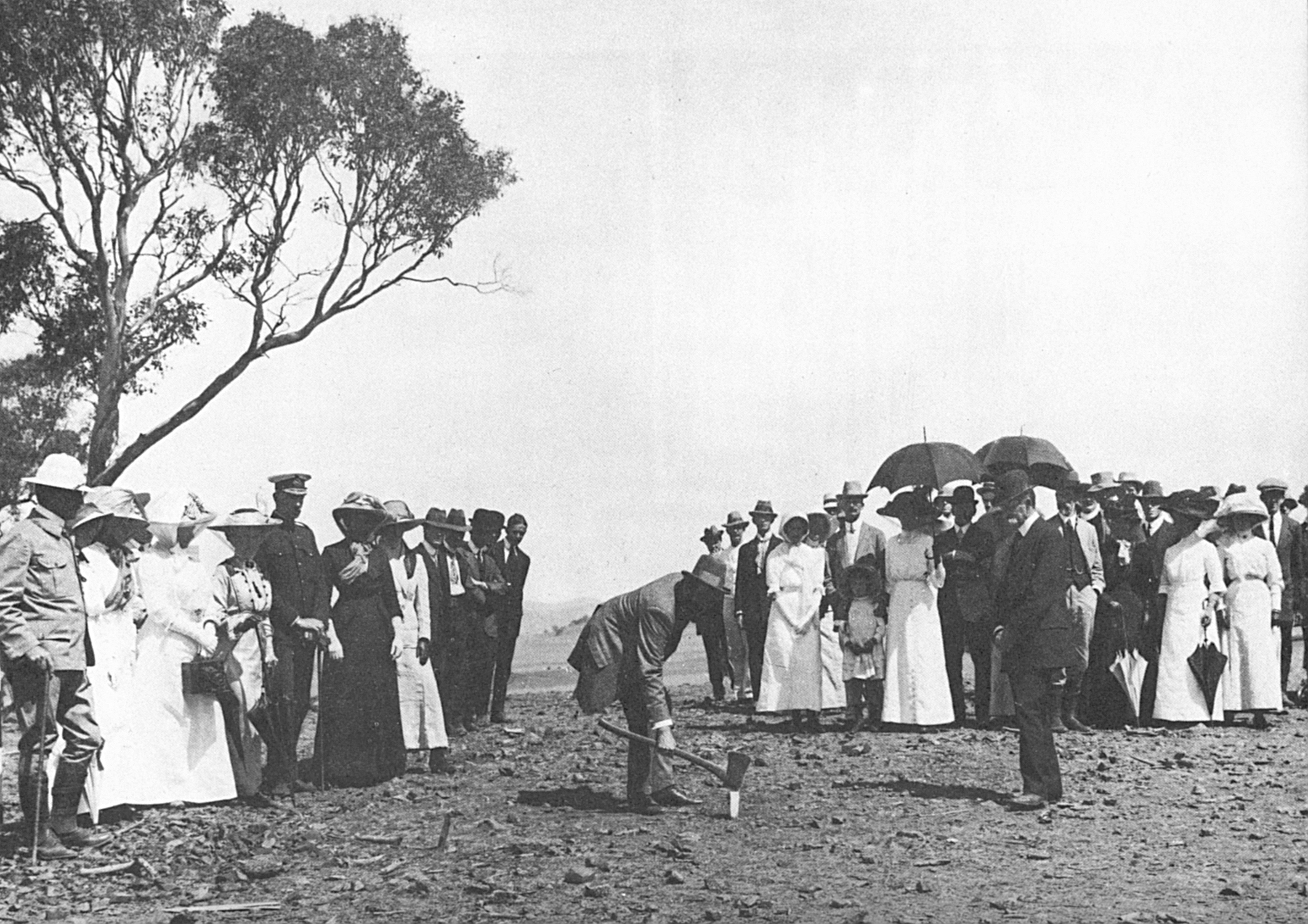
King O'Malley drives the first survey peg at Canberra, 20 February 1913.

Canberra's growth over the first few decades was slow, and Canberra was indeed far more a small country town than a capital before World War II. It was noted for being more trees and fields than houses. Cattle grazing near Parliament House was a common occurrence, something which amazed General Macarthur when he visited Canberra during World War II.

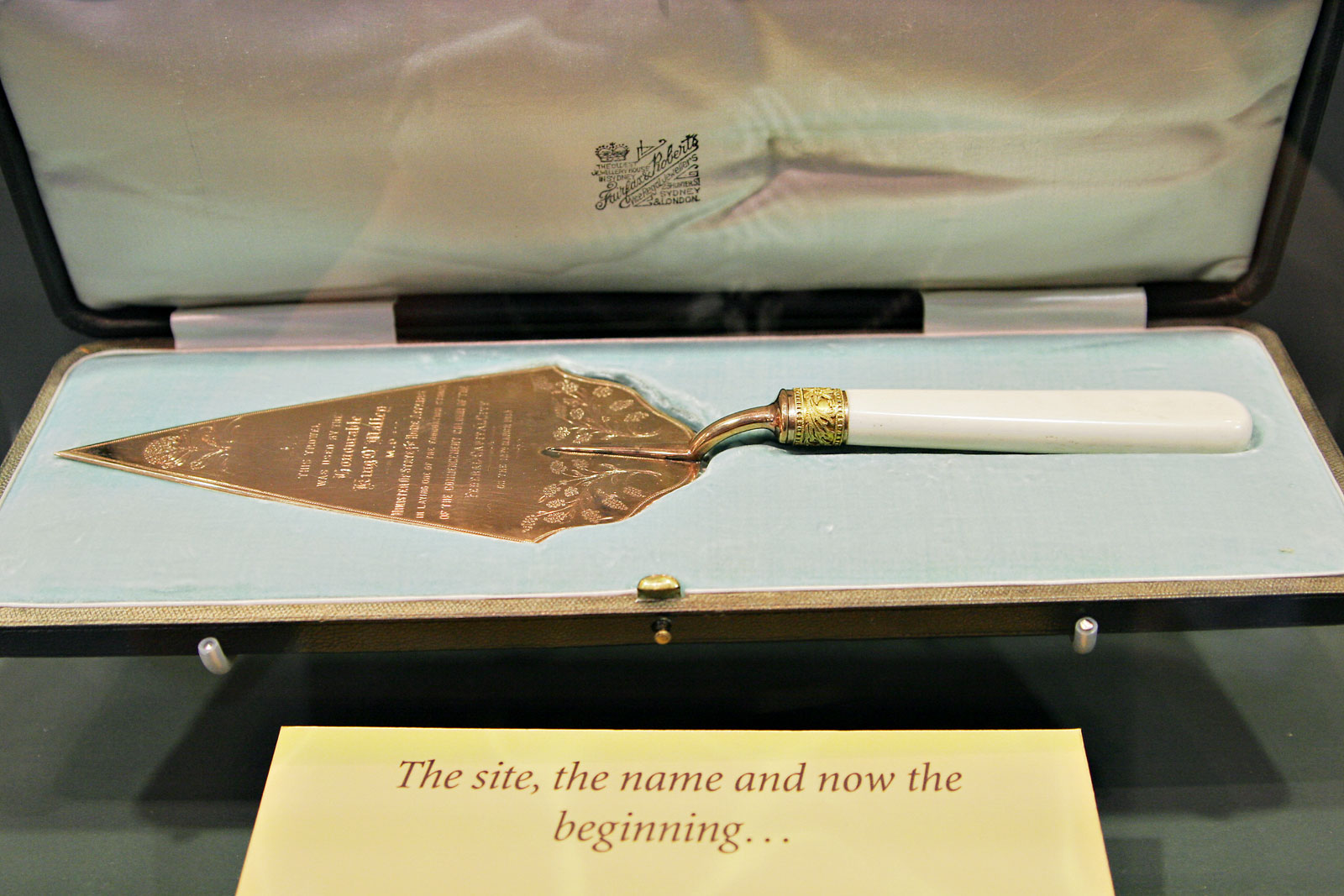
Foundation trowel

The responsible government minister, King O'Malley, drove the first survey peg in the Canberra area on 20 February 1913 to mark the commencement of work on the new city. As we have seen, on 12 March that same year, the city was formally named by the Governor-General's wife, Lady Denman, at a ceremony held on Capital Hill, the site of Australia's current Parliament House.

The construction of the capital began in what is now North Canberra and South Canberra. The pace of building work was slower than expected because of the outbreak of World War I in 1914 and a dispute between Griffin and various Commonwealth bureaucrats. In 1917, a Royal Commission determined that these individuals had undermined Griffin's authority by supplying false data to him, which he had used in carrying out his work. Ultimately, Griffin resigned from the Canberra design project in 1920, when he discovered that several of these same people had been appointed to the Federal Capital Advisory Committee formed to oversee Canberra's construction.

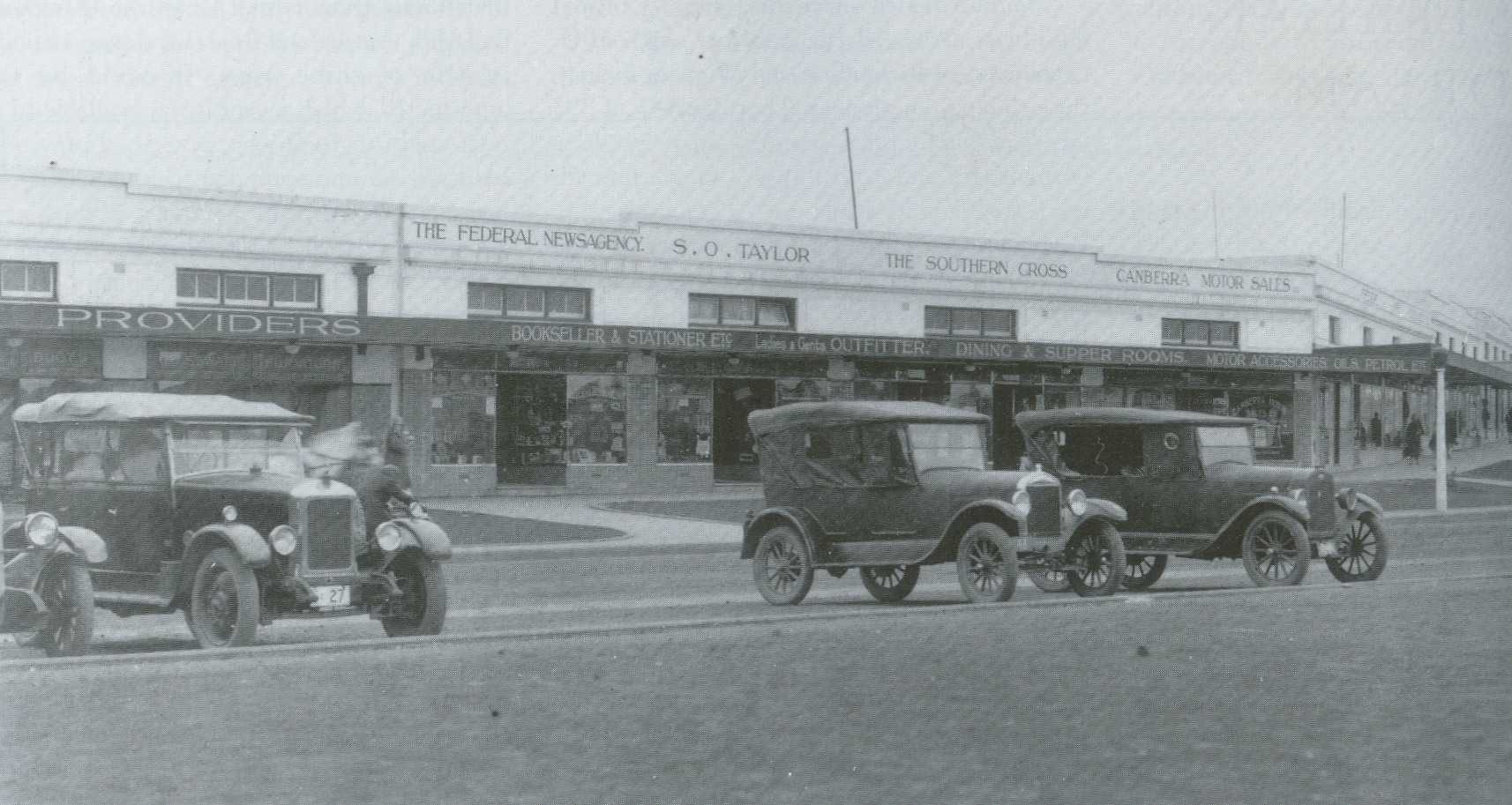
Giles Street, Eastlake, now Kingston, in 1928

Initially almost all construction work in the capital was undertaken by Commonwealth instrumentalities. Government-built housing, required to accommodate the public servants transferred from interstate, formed the basis for Canberra's first suburbs. The suburbs that were slowly built over the next several years included Parkes, Barton, Kingston, Manuka, Braddon and Reid. These suburbs often had other names – for instance, Kingston was originally known as Eastlake – before a formal renaming procedure took place in 1928. They were erected largely in accordance to Walter Burley Griffin's designs for Canberra. The men who constructed these suburbs lived in a series of workers' camps, which consisted of tents and some brick cottages. Building materials were obtained from quarries in the North Canberra area. A temporary railway was used to shift materials.

A rail line linking Canberra with the town of Queanbeyan across the border in NSW was constructed just prior to the outbreak of World War I. It opened for freight/industrial services on 25 May 1914 but was freed up for passenger trains 10 years later. A formal foundation stone for the city was laid by the Prince of Wales, the future Edward VIII, on 21 June 1920. Additions to Government House at Yarralumla, as well as building work on the Prime Minister's Lodge and what is now "Old Parliament House", were also carried out during this pivotal period.

In 1918, an internment camp for German World War I prisoners-of-war was established in Canberra's eastern outskirts, in what is nowadays the suburb of Fyshwick. This camp instead housed mainly civilian internees transferred there from facilities in other locations such as the NSW town of Bourke. After 1919, the old internment became a workers' camp. In later years, the camp was closed and the roads that had serviced it were turned into urban streets.

Canberra's first blocks of land for residential and commercial use were sold by auction on 12 December 1924. Buildings were subsequently erected on these allotments, but their residents endured a gruelling start to their occupancy when a flood struck Canberra in February 1925. The flood came about as the result of the Molonglo River bursting its banks. The surging water threatened or damaged many structures, and some drownings resulted.

Canberra's first school, Telopea Park School, had already been opened in 1923. Public transport became available in July 1925, and two shopping areas were established at Manuka and Kingston in 1925.

The year 1927 saw the opening of a cinema at Manuka and an Australian Capital Territory police force was formed. Also in 1927, the fledgling city's CBD was officially established. It was meant to be called Civic Centre, but then Prime Minister Stanley Bruce vetoed the idea and it became officially known as City Centre. However, City Centre is still commonly referred to by Canberrans as "Civic".

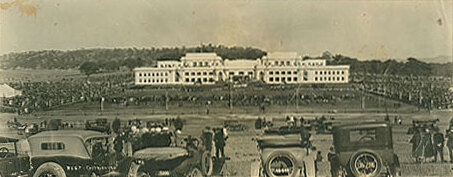
Opening of Parliament House in May 1927

But the most significant event of 1927 was clearly the opening of the provisional Parliament House (now known as the "Old Parliament House") on 9 May 1927. On this date also, Melbourne ceased being the national capital and seat of government and Canberra assumed this role. Amongst the first legislation dealt with in the new parliament house was an act to repeal O'Malley's unpopular prohibition laws. This took effect in 1928.

The Federal Capital Commission, had, meanwhile, been busy increasing the social amenity of the fledgeling city. In 1926 the Causeway Hall was erected, and was host to the first performance of the newly established Canberra Philharmonic Society (later Canberra Musical Society) on 15 May. A larger, more central venue, named the Albert Hall, was opened in 1928, the same year as the Canberra Croquet Club

Canberra's workforce did not escape the adverse effects of the Great Depression when it hit Australia in 1929. In 1930, around 1800 labour-force workers and about one-seventh of the Commonwealth Public Service's staff in Canberra were retrenched. Soon, Canberra's growth ground to a complete halt, with even the governmental agency supervising its development being abolished for a while. Some major construction projects planned for the capital, including Anglican and Roman Catholic cathedrals, were not undertaken due to funds set aside for their planned construction being diverted for relief measures during the Depression. Having lost this early impetus, neither denomination has built a major centre of worship in the capital, although, in 1973, after major extensions, St Christopher's Catholic Church, Manuka, was raised to the status of Cathedral (the Anglican cathedral remains in the nearby city of Goulburn).

Despite these setbacks, the Canberra community continued to develop in sophistication, if not in size, with the establishment of community facilities such as a radio station (2CA) in 1931 (initially run from a shop in the Kingston area), and the amateur dramatic Canberra Repertory Society in 1932. The planning and construction of the Australian War Memorial under the supervision of the war historian Charles Bean also began in Canberra at this time. The memorial was eventually completed at the height of World War II, in 1941, and its opening ceremony was conducted on 11 November of that year.

Embassies and High Commissions began to establish themselves in Canberra during the 1930s. The United Kingdom appointed their first High Commissioner to Australia in 1936. Canada appointed a representative in 1937 and the United States of America opened a mission in 1939 with their first envoy presenting his credentials in 1940. The United States was the first mission to build its own chancery in 1943. In 1946 Australia and the US raised the rank of representatives exchanged by the two countries to that of Ambassador; the American Embassy thus becoming the first embassy to be established in Canberra. Other countries, such as Sweden, followed soon afterwards. (Nowadays, Canberra contains a comprehensive array of embassies and other diplomatic missions.)

For all this, Canberra remained a small country town prior to World War II, far more rural than urban in its nature and size, with little to mark it as Australia's capital other than Parliament House and the developing War Memorial. Its social centre remained the Kingston/Manuka area.

=== After World War II ===
Canberra's population

Wartime conditions emphasised the need for an airport. On 1 April 1940, a military air base, RAAF Station Canberra, was established on a flat plain between Canberra and Queanbeyan. Later, this was renamed RAAF Fairbairn in memory of the Minister for Air, James V. Fairbairn, who was killed with a number of other ministers and officials when an aircraft crashed into a nearby hill in dense fog on 13 August 1940. Canberra Airport was constructed in the 1960s; the military base and commercial airport share the same runway.

Canberra began to grow more rapidly after World War II, as more and more government departments were transferred from Melbourne to the capital. The Australian National University was opened as a research institute in 1946. Undergraduate teaching continued at the Canberra University College, and the two were amalgamated in 1960. Entertainment and cultural organisations also began to flourish with the new influx of people. Until the opening of the Canberra Theatre Centre in 1965, the Albert Hall was home to a large number of prominent organisations, including the Canberra Orchestral Society (later the Canberra Symphony Orchestra) founded in 1950, a new Canberra Philharmonic Society (for musical theatre, 1951) and the Canberra Choral Society (1952).

Parts of Canberra formed the backdrop for Cold War espionage activity, highlighted during the 1954 Petrov Affair when a Soviet Union spy defected to Australia. Telopea Park in south Canberra was a known drop-off point for KGB spies based at the nearby USSR Embassy. This embassy was constantly monitored by ASIO agents based in the Kingston Hotel located across the street. There was also an ASIO listening post on the grounds of Canberra Grammar School. In 1991, with the end of the Cold War and the collapse of the Soviet Union, the embassy grounds became the Russian Embassy.

In March 1958, the National Capital Development Commission (NCDC) took over the planning and construction of Canberra. Under the control of the NCDC new districts, such as Woden and Tuggeranong, were established and slowly developed throughout the 1960s and 1970s to accommodate a growing population. The original design for Canberra did not extend beyond the central suburbs, and thus it was possible to design them to take better advantage of the land contours. Woden was established in 1964, Belconnen in 1967 and Tuggeranong in 1973. These additional districts helped to encourage large population growth between 1960 and 1975.

The construction of Lake Burley Griffin in central Canberra, along the course of the Molonglo, was commenced in the early 1960s, based largely on Walter Burley Griffin's original plans. A move to name it Lake Menzies, after the then Prime Minister Sir Robert Menzies, was vetoed by Menzies himself. The lake was formed by Scrivener Dam, named after Charles Scrivener, located at what is now the western end of Lake Burley Griffin. The dam was completed in 1963, and its valves closed on 20 September 1963, to allow the lake to form. However, the area was in drought at the time and the lake did not actually fill until April 1964, when the drought broke. This allowed the first event scheduled for the lake, a rowing championship, to take place. In 1970, the Captain James Cook Memorial was added, as part of the celebrations held that year to mark the bicentennial of the discovery of Australia's east coast by Captain James Cook.

The 1971 Canberra flood disaster occurred in the Woden Valley of Canberra on Australia Day of that year. The flood killed seven people, injured 15 and affected 500 others.

Canberra's residents are keen followers and participants in sports, and Bruce Stadium was opened during 1978 and later hosted several important Sydney 2000 soccer games.

Among key cultural and civic landmarks, the National Library of Australia building opened in 1968, the High Court of Australia building opened in 1980, the National Gallery of Australia building in 1982, the National Museum of Australia building in 2001 and the National Portrait Gallery of Australia building in 2008. All these facilities and institutions are situated on or near the shores of Lake Burley Griffin.

The NCDC's Metropolitan Canberra Policy Plan Development Plan (published July 1984) was an assessment of two alternative options for Canberra - a concentrated plan and a dispersed plan. It was decided to adopt the dispersed plan.

In 1985 the Transport Branch of the NCDC Engineering Division produced a report of their concerns of an oversupply of office building approvals in Civic (titled Transport Implications of City Development). Ian Morison (one of the authors of the Y-Plan) claimed in a 1987 journal article that "the Commission obviously did not want to know about it, so the report was kept under wraps until it was subpoenaed in the Supreme Court".

On May 9 1988, a new, much larger Commonwealth Parliament House was opened on Capital Hill in State Circle, Parkes. This imposing complex of parliamentary chambers, public spaces, offices and other facilities replaced the outmoded (Provisional) Parliament House that had operated close by for some 60 years. The complex's elaborate opening ceremony was a centrepiece of Australia's bicentenary celebrations, which were held nationwide to mark the 200th anniversary of the arrival of the First Fleet from England, and the foundation of European settlement in what was to become the City of Sydney in 1788.

Significantly, the Australian Capital Territory was granted full self-government in December 1988, when an act passed by Federal Parliament that made the territory a body politic under the Crown was signed by Queen Elizabeth II. On 11 May 1989, following the elections earlier that year, a 17-member Legislative Assembly began sitting at its offices in London Circuit, Civic. The inaugural ACT government was led by Chief Minister Rosemary Follett.

In 1992, Canberra was the host city for the 7th Assembly of the World Council of Churches.

=== Transport ===
Since the days of the Griffin Plan corridors have been reserved for use by high-capacity, fixed-route public transport.

The election in 1972 of the reformist Whitlam government brought reform to Canberra's transport strategy. The National Capital Development Commission was ordered to change its transport policy.

In 1974 the National Capital Development Commission announced a shift in transport planning, designed primarily to prioritise intertown public transport and discourage private vehicles for commuting.

The Commission's Transport Policy was a progressive, possibly radical, approach to transport planning for the time. The new policy, which was dated July 1974 and endorsed by the NCDC and Department of the Capital Territory included:

The unnecessary use of the private car for commuting purposes will be discouraged. Any shortfall in peak hour road capacity or parking space will be offset by the provision of improved public transport facilities. The provision of car parking in the main centres will be maintained at the minimum necessary to protect the environment and promote public transport usage.

The policy encouraged medium density housing close to employment centres and along major transport routes, employment centres adjacent to public transport terminals to reduce the need for excessive travel, and promoted cycling as a transport mode. In other ways it was conventional for the time - the construction of elevated walkways to separate pedestrians from vehicles. It represented an "end to the policy of provision of road and parking space on a scale designed to eliminate congestion" and planned a transition from transport dominated by private cars.

In 1976, a report title 'Intertown Public Transport: Alternatives for Canberra' was published. This documented the view of a task-force that a conventional priority bus system was preferred foreseeable future ("i.e the next 5 - 10 years"), and that no non-conventional (automated) public transport system was recommended in the near future. It did make a recommendation to reserve a corridor for a grade-separated alignment in the future.

The Canberra Short Term Transport Planning Study, commissioned to assess whether the new policy direction was achievable, was commenced in October 1975 and concluded in December 1976. The analysis conducted in the 1977 Canberra Short Term Transport Planning Study Report indicated that no new highway construction was required to accommodate off-peak traffic demand forecast in 1982. An earlier 1976 paper was also published.

In 1977, ACTION said it was providing 15 minute bus frequencies to 27 suburbs all-day. Canberra was a pioneer of the timed-transfer bus system, and was cited as a model in a 1981 study for the US Department of Transportation. A map of a theoretical bus station was presented based on Woden Interchange.

By 1984, the roads policy was designed on the opposite basis to the 1974 transport policy. The 1984 Metropolitan Canberra report stated that peak-hour travel demands were used for road design capacities, that mode split (bus mode share) would need to more than double before any change to the "recommended" scale of road plans, and that off-peak traffic was not considered - as congestion was not expected to occur then.

By the 1980s, the NCDC "buried the new transport policy approach" that ACTION sought to implement. The NCDC didn't justify rejecting the recommendations of the Short Term Transport Study - the report was suppressed. It was never published, and never publicly mentioned. All copies vanished from the Commission’s library and its archives. A copy was later found by Paul Mees in the Melbourne University Architecture Library.

This led to Canberra being a car-dominated city today. In 2006 Canberrans were the most likely of any Australian city dwellers to use their cars to get to work. The ACT community have a high dependence on cars for transport. Cars were used for around 86% of trips to work in 2022, and 75% of all trips. The late Paul Mees extensively covered the history of transport planning in Canberra.

In 1988, Comeng proposed a Light Rail system for Canberra.

== 21st century ==
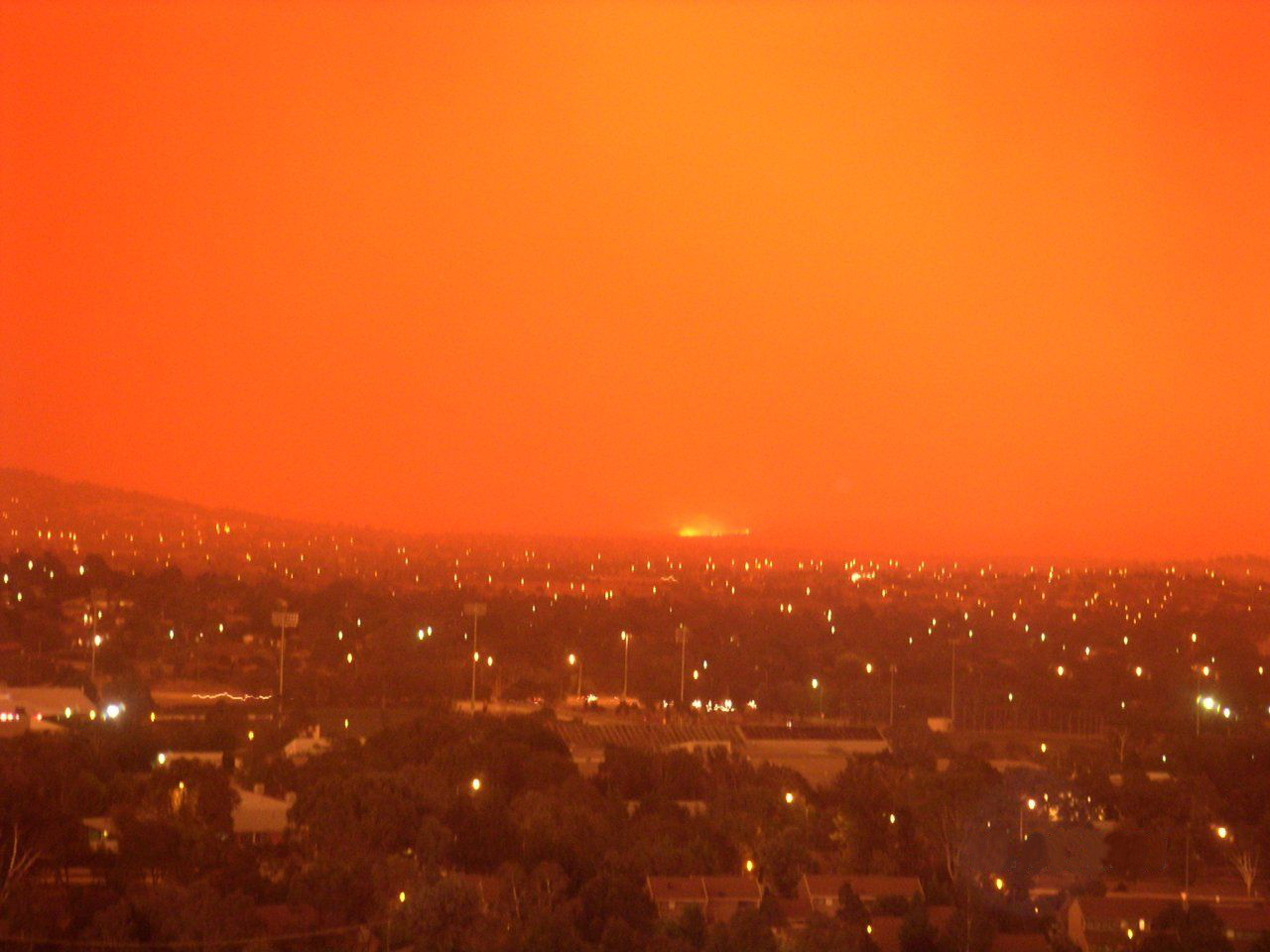
2003 bushfires

On 18 January 2003, bushfires that had been burning in the remote wilderness west of Canberra broke containment lines and engulfed some of Canberra. About 500 homes were destroyed before a change in the weather brought the bushfire under control. The suburb of Duffy was hit especially hard, with some 200 homes destroyed. Four people died in the conflagration and many more were injured.

The development of Canberra is ongoing. Major new works under construction in recent years include the Gungahlin Town Centre, City West Precinct and the Kingston Foreshores Development. On 5 March 2004, the Canberra Spatial Plan for the city's future development was released. As of 2005 plans were under development for a new Canberra district to be situated west of Lake Burley Griffin, on land formerly occupied by a pine plantation. These include areas such as Denman Prospect and the Molonglo Valley.

== Canberra's population timeline ==
Population of the Australian Capital Territory:
1911: 1,714
1930: 9,000
1945: 13,000
1957: 39,000
1960: 50,000
1966: 96,000
1971: 146,000
1976: 203,100
1983: 235,000
1988: 270,000
2000: 311,000
2011: 356,000
2016: 395,790
2021: 454,000

== Sites of significance ==
There are many sites of significance for Aboriginal people in and around Canberra especially in the Pialigo area.

- Acton Peninsula is now home to the Australian Institute of Aboriginal and Torres Strait Islander Studies.
- Mount Ainslie and Black Mountain are the breasts of the spirit woman who lies in the Canberra landscape. On the latter was Black's Camp, a women's business camp where women went to give birth.
- The site of Parliament House is the womb of the spirit woman who lies in the Canberra landscape.
- The Molonglo River, previously called the Limestone and Fish Rivere, is a provider of food for the indigenous people, including fish, turtles and crayfish.
- The area at the Australian National University campus around Sullivans Creek, known as Ngambri Creek to the Ngambri people, was a campsite.
- Aboriginal people camped at Red Hill year-round, including during the construction of Old Parliament House in the 1920s.
- An ochre site in Queanbeyan (now developed over) was where Aboriginal people sourced brilliant white ochre for trade and for their own use to decorate their bodies for song and dance and ceremony.
- Queanbeyan Showground was a campsite, gathering place and burial site for Aboriginal people. In 1841 and onwards, Aboriginal people gathered at Queanbeyan Showground at the start of winter for government blanket distribution.
- The Tuggeranong sandstone axe-grinding grooves. Ngambri women in the past prepared bread using native seeds at the site while men sharpened axes.
- The Wanniassa canoe tree, a gumtree used in the late 1800s or early 1900s to make a canoe that was paddled on the Molonglo River for a span of several summers.

== See also ==
- History of the Australian Capital Territory
- People from Canberra
