= Kenny, Australian Capital Territory =

Kenny
- Suburb
- Interactive map of Kenny
- Coordinates: 35.213°S 149.155°E
- Country: Australia
- State: Australian Capital Territory
- City: Canberra
- District: Gungahlin
- Location: 9 km (5.6 mi) NNE of Canberra CBD; 26 km (16 mi) NNW of Queanbeyan; 83 km (52 mi) SW of Goulburn; 280 km (170 mi) SW of Sydney

Government
  - Territory electorate: Yerrabi
  - Federal division: Fenner
- Elevation: 597 m (1,959 ft)
- Postcode: 2911
Suburbs around Kenny
Harrison	Throsby
Franklin	Kenny	Watson
Mitchell	Mitchell	Watson

Kenny is a designated suburb in the Canberra, Australia district of Gungahlin. The suburb is named in honour of Elizabeth Kenny, an Australian who pioneered muscle rehabilitation practices which serve as the foundation of physiotherapy. It is adjacent to the suburbs of Watson, Lyneham, the Mitchell industrial estate, Harrison and Throsby and bounded by the Federal Highway to the east and Horse Park Drive to the north. The suburb Kenny is situated about 4 km from the Gungahlin Towncentre and 8 km from the centre of Canberra.

== History ==
Portions of Kenny are occupied by the rural properties Bendoura, and Canberra Park. 'Canberra Park' was established by William Ginn, who previously worked for George Campbell, of Duntroon, and lived at Blundell's Cottage from 1859 The cottage named after a later resident George Blundell was located near to what was until the 1960s the Molonglo River and since then by Lake Burley Griffin. Ploughman William Ginn and his family were the first to live in the farmhouse, departing ten years later when they moved to 'Canberra Park'.

Urban development within the suburb commenced in 2021, with construction beginning on an $85 million high school, catering for years 7 to 10. Opening in time for the 2024 school year, the facility was officially named Shirley Smith High School on 20 May of that year.

== Facilities ==
The Bimberi Youth Justice Centre is located in Kenny. The facility houses 10-21 year olds on remand or serving a custodial sentence.

== Transport ==
Kenny is served by the Well Station Drive station on the Canberra light rail network. ACTION bus route 18 deviates via the Bimberi Centre several times per day, connecting to Gungahlin and Dickson Interchange. The Bimberi Centre can also be reached by a short walk from Sandford Street light rail station is also available.

== Geology ==
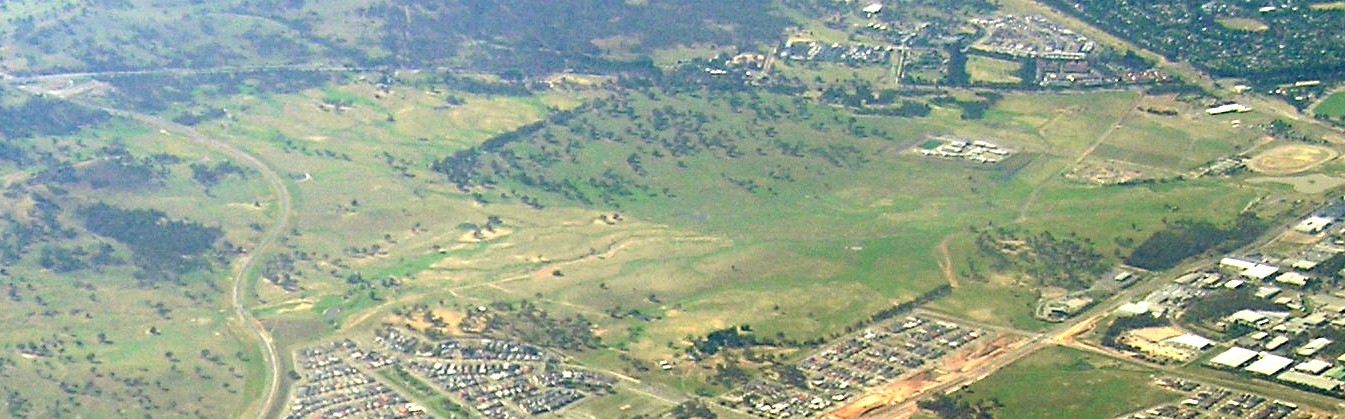
In 2009 Kenny was still a greenfield in front of the Federal Highway

Located in the suburb is part of Sullivans Creek, which flows on into Mitchell. This is the lowest point at 582 metres (1,909 ft). The high side is on the east, with creeks flowing in the south west direction. The suburb is fairly flat. The geology of the area is mudstone and shale from the Canberra Formation of middle Silurian age. Around the creeks is plenty of alluvium.
