= Sullivans Creek =

Coordinates: 35°18′S 149°06′E

Sullivans Creek Canberry Creek, Canburry Creek
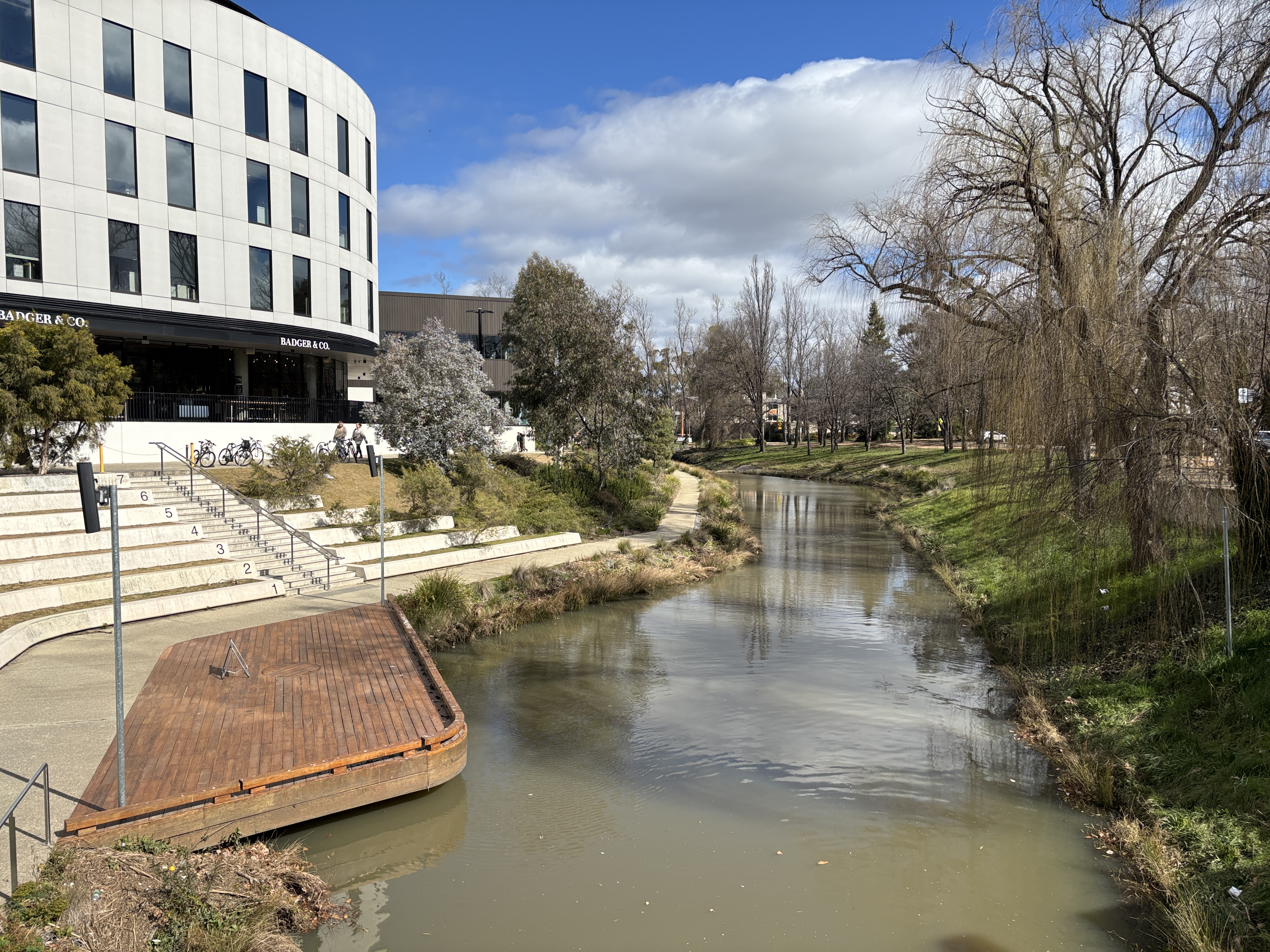
- Part of Sullivans Creek in the grounds of the Australian National University
- Etymology: In honour of William Sulivan, an early settler

Location
- Country: Australia
- Territory: Australian Capital Territory
- IBRA: South Eastern Highlands
- District: Capital Country
- City: Canberra

Physical characteristics
- Source: Runoff from Mount Majura, Mount Ainslie, O'Connor Ridge and Black Mountain
  - location: near Kenny and Watson
- Mouth: confluence with Molonglo River, into Lake Burley Griffin
  - location: near Acton
- Length: 13 km (8.1 mi)
- Basin size: 52 km^{2} (20 sq mi)

Basin features
- River system: Murrumbidgee River, Murray–Darling basin
- Reservoir: Lake Burley Griffin

Sullivans Creek, a partly perennial stream of the Murrumbidgee catchment within the Murray–Darling basin, is located in Canberra, Australian Capital Territory, Australia.

== Location and features ==
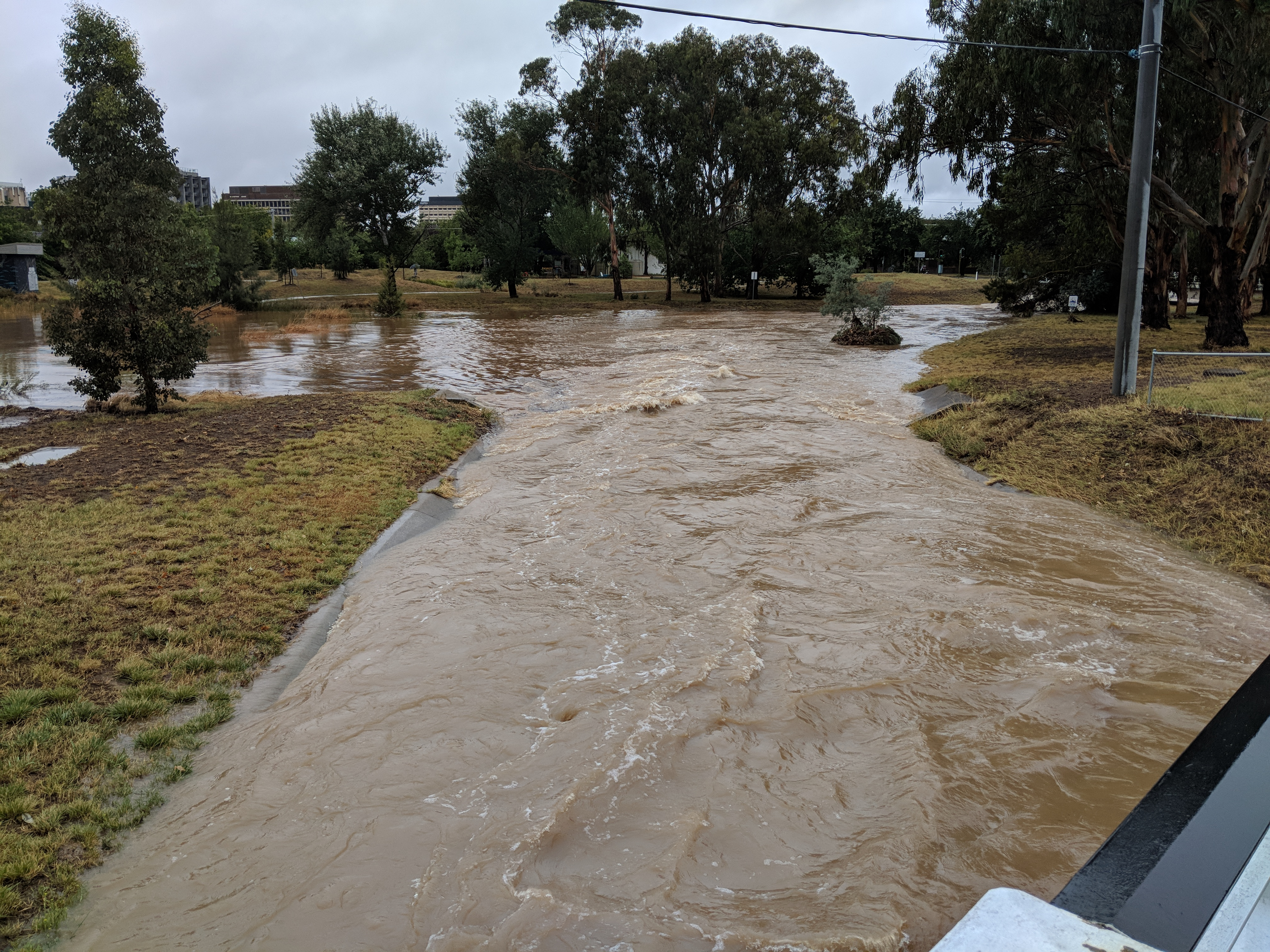
Sullivans Creek in flood in 2018 near the Lyneham wet lands

Sullivans Creek rises close to the border between the Australian Capital Territory and New South Wales, north-east of Kenny, and north-west of Watson. The creek is formed by runoff from Mount Majura, Mount Ainslie, O'Connor Ridge and Black Mountain. Sullivans Creek flows generally south-west, through a small channel within a much larger older gully system in its upper reaches; and through a series of urban sealed stormwater channels in its middle reaches; before reaching the grounds of the Australian National University, towards its confluence with the Molonglo River near Acton. Molonglo River is now dammed as Lake Burley Griffin. The creek has a catchment area of 52 square kilometres (20 sq mi) and is approximately 13 kilometres (8.1 mi) long.

The creek was originally called Canberry (or Canburry) Creek, since early European settlement in the area, from 1823. During the 1850s, William Sullivan and his family acquired grazing land surrounding the creek, and at some stage thereafter, the creek name was changed to Sullivans Creek. Within the grounds of the Australian National University, the creek's original course has been altered to accommodate growth of the campus and enhance the natural landscape. Within the Acton campus, two bridges cross Sullivans Creek; MacPherson's Bridge, that was named after the original landowner, John MacPherson, and Canberry Bridge.

Following heavy rains during 2012 that caused minor flooding of Sullivans Creek, it was reported that people were rafting along the course of the creek, within the grounds of the Australian National University.

After flooding was caused by heavy rains in 2018, all of the books on the lower levels of the ANU's Chifley Library were destroyed by the overflow.

== See also ==
- List of rivers of Australia
- History of Canberra
