= Harrison, Australian Capital Territory =

Harrison
- Suburb
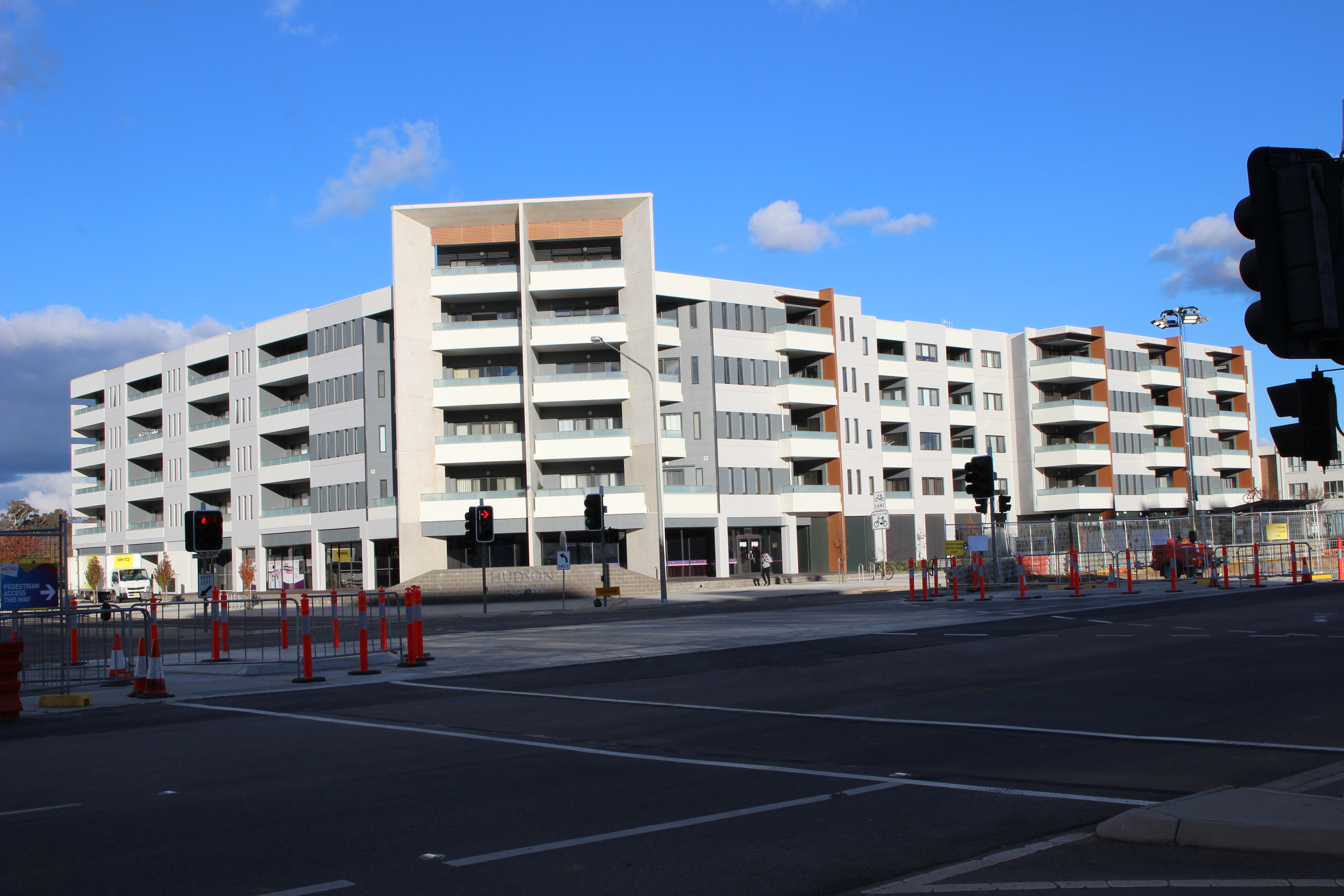
- Light rail construction on Flemington Road, Harrison

- Coordinates: 35°11′51″S 149°9′16″E
- Country: Australia
- State: Australian Capital Territory
- City: Canberra
- District: Gungahlin
- Location: 10 km (6.2 mi) N of Canberra CBD; 27 km (17 mi) NNW of Queanbeyan; 83 km (52 mi) SW of Goulburn; 280 km (170 mi) SW of Sydney

Government
  - Territory electorate: Yerrabi
  - Federal division: Fenner

Area
  - Total: 3.0 km^{2} (1.2 sq mi)
- Elevation: 612 m (2,008 ft)

Population
  - Total: 8,244 (SAL 2021)
- Postcode: 2914
- Gazetted: 18 October 1991
Suburbs around Harrison
Gungahlin	Gungahlin	Kenny
Franklin	Harrison	Kenny
Mitchell

Harrison is a suburb of the district of Gungahlin in Canberra, Australia. The suburb is named after the former city planner Peter Harrison, who was instrumental in reviving Walter Burley Griffin's plan for the National Capital. The suburb is adjacent to the suburbs of Franklin, Gungahlin, Throsby, Kenny and the industrial estate Mitchell. Harrison's place names reflects those of "natural features, waterfalls, plains, tablelands and plateaux". The suburb is located approximately 2 km east of the Gungahlin Town Centre and about 10 km from the centre of Canberra.

Following the launch of Light Rail on 20 April by the ACT government, Harrison residents now have access to Light Rail services from any of the stops along Flemington Road.

== Notable places ==
The suburb of Harrison has two heritage-listed sites:

- Gungaderra Homestead
- Well Station Homestead Precinct

== Demographics ==
According to the 2021 census, the population of Harrison was 8,244, of these 50.5% were male and 49.5% were female. The median age of Harrison residents was 31 years old.

- Aboriginal and Torres Strait Islander people made up 1.1% of the population which were lower than the national and territory averages.
- The most common ancestries in Harrison were Australian (25.6%), English (23.5%), Chinese (12.6%), Indian (8.2%) and Scottish (6.5%).
- The most common countries of birth in Harrison were Australia (55.8%), India (7.4%), China (7.3%), Nepal (2.8%), South Korea (2%) and England (1.9%).
- The religious affiliation of most Harrison residents were No religion (39.5%), Catholic (16.2%), Hinduism (10.7%), Islam (5.8%) and Anglican (5.6%).

== Schools ==
Name	Suburb	Type	District	Opened	Website	Notes
Harrison School	Harrison	Public	Gungahlin	2008	Website	K-10
Mother Teresa Primary School	Harrison	Catholic	Gungahlin	2010	Website	K-6
Harrison Early Childhood Centre	Harrison	Private	Gungahlin	2010	Website	K-2

== Parks ==
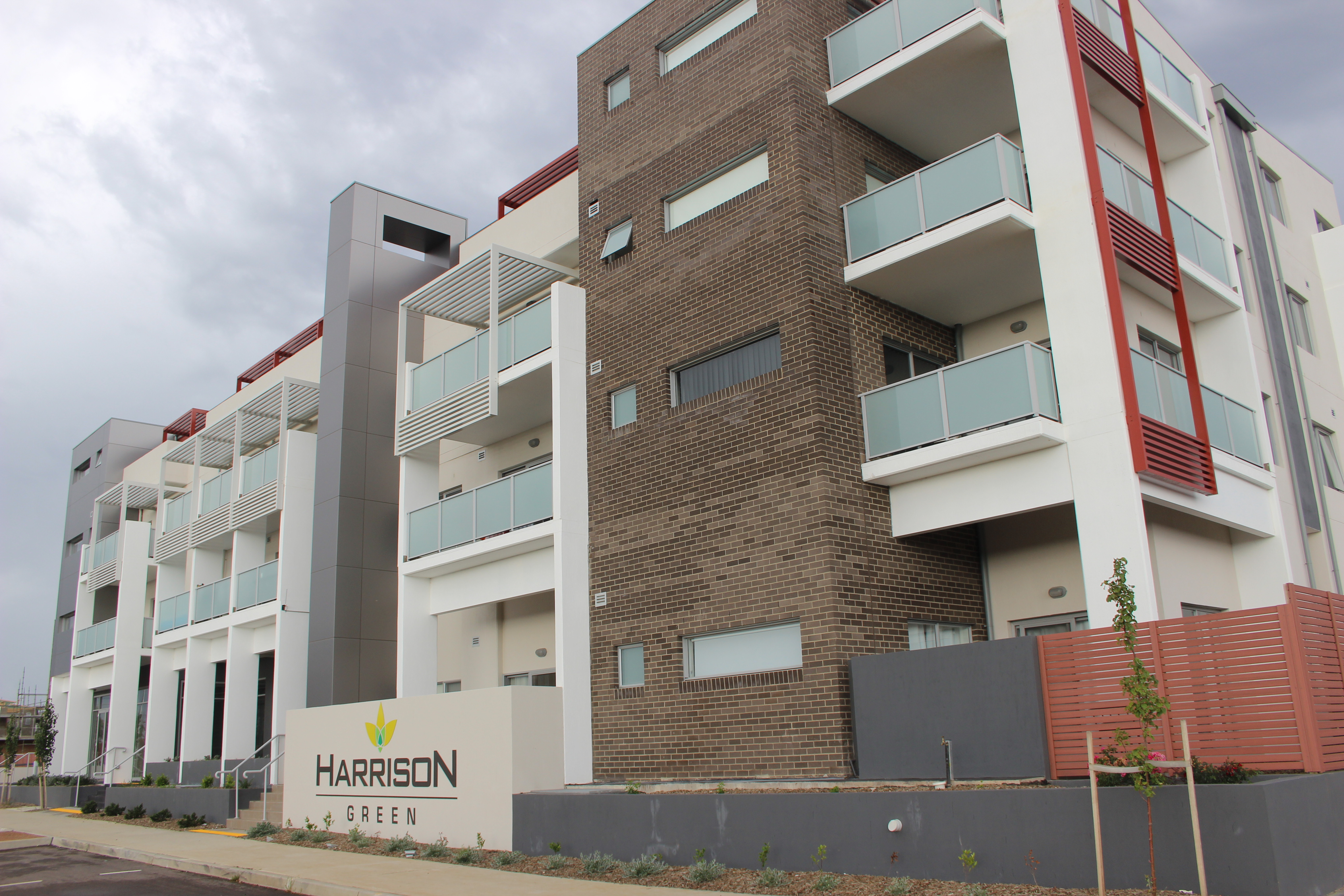
Harrison Green flats

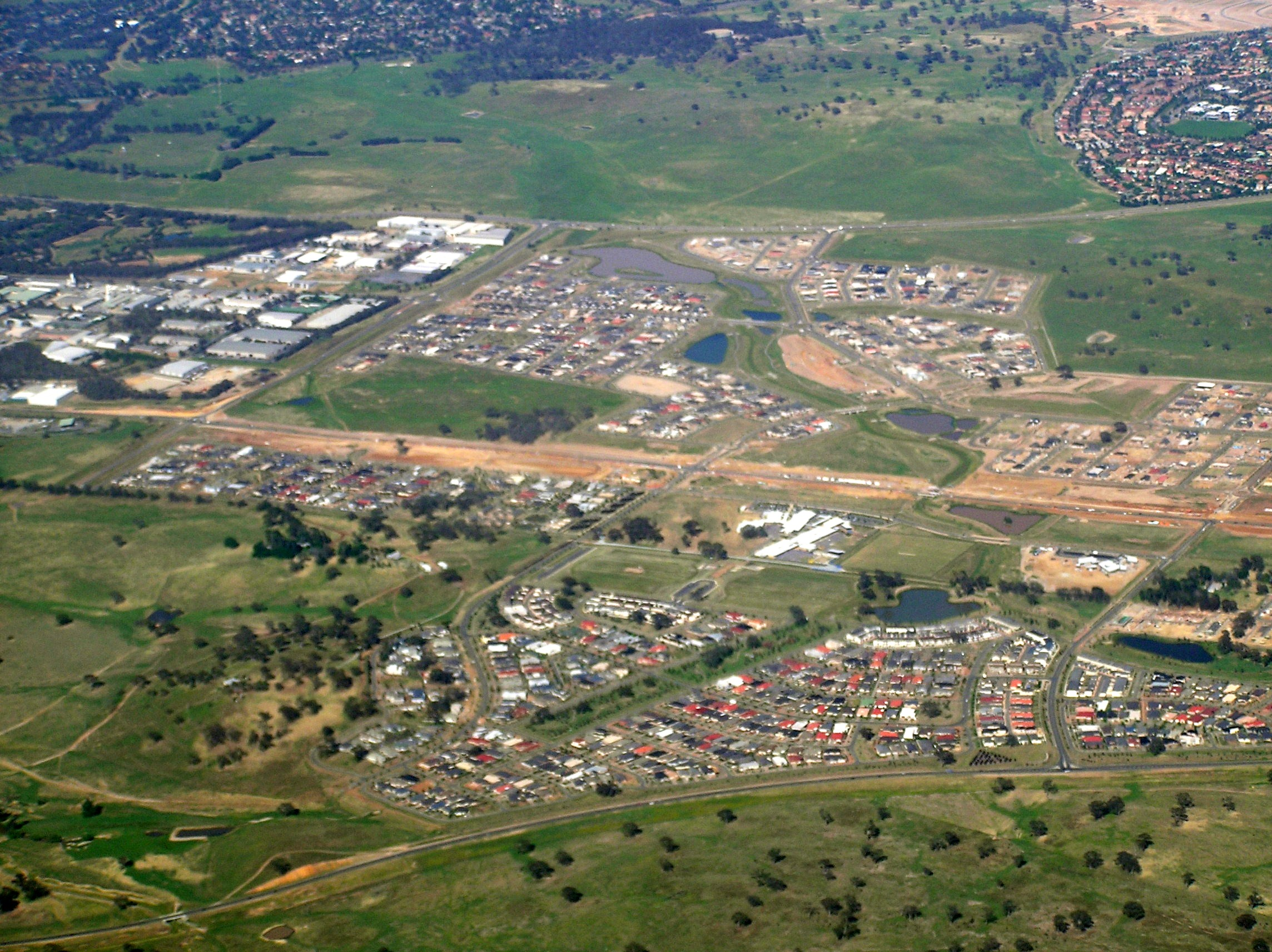
Harrison and Franklin aerial view from north east

Address	PlayGym
Eric Mawson St, Harrison ACT 2914	No
Turtle Rock St, Harrison ACT 2914	No
Tanami St, Harrison ACT 2914	Yes
Moonlight St, Harrison ACT 2914	Yes

== Geology ==
Harrison is underlaid mostly by the Canberra Formation mudstone or volcanics from the late middle Silurian age. Near the eastern corner is an outcrop of the Ainslie Volcanics dacite or andesite.
