= Crace =

Crace may refer to:

== People ==
- Edward Kendall Crace (1844–1892), Australian pastoralist
- Sir John Gregory Crace, KBE, CB (1887–1968), officer in Royal Navy and Royal Australian Navy
- Jim Crace (born 1946), English writer
- John Crace (writer) (born 1956), British journalist and critic
- Lauren Crace (born 1986), English actress

=== English interior designers ===
- Edward Crace (1725–1799), English interior designer and Keeper of the King's Pictures
- John Crace (designer) (1754–1819), eldest son of Edward Crace, English interior designer
- Frederick Crace (1779–1859), English interior decorator and collector of maps and prints, eldest son of John Crace
- John Gregory Crace (designer) (1809–1889), English interior designer and author, elder surviving son of Frederick Crace
- John Dibblee Crace (1838–1919), English interior designer and author, eldest son of John Gregory Crace

== Places ==
- Crace, Australian Capital Territory, an established suburb of Canberra, Australia
