= John Crace =

John Crace may refer to:

- John Dibblee Crace (1838–1919), British interior designer
- John Gregory Crace (designer) (1809–1889), British interior designer
- Sir John Gregory Crace (1887–1968), British rear admiral
- John Crace (writer) (born 1956), British journalist and critic
