= Palmerville =

Palmerville may refer to:

== Australia ==
- Palmerston, Australian Capital Territory, named for Palmerville, a nearby earlier settlement which was later renamed Ginninderra
- Palmerville, Queensland, a former mining town in the Shire of Cook
- Palmerville Station, a heritage train station in Maytown, Queensland, Australia on the Palmer River

== United States ==
- Palmerville, New York, United States, in St. Lawrence County
