= Gold Creek Homestead =

Coordinates: 35°10′32″S 149°06′14″E

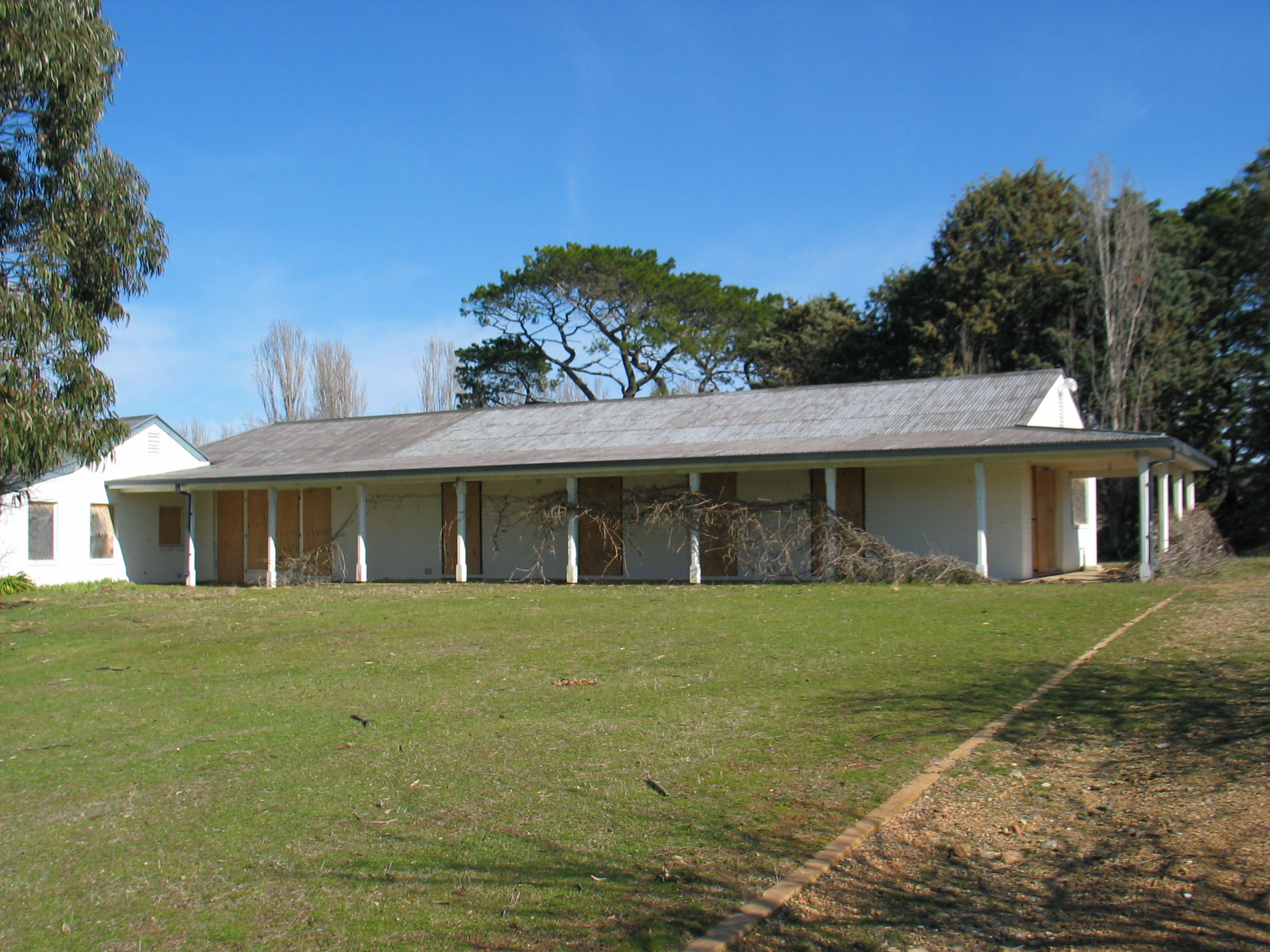
- Gold Creek Homestead, 2006.
- Interactive map of the Gold Creek Homestead area

Gold Creek Homestead is a 140-year-old stone and brick building located off Gungahlin Drive in Ngunnawal a northwestern suburb of Canberra, Australia. It is adjacent to the Grove Ngunnawal retirement village currently being developed by Lend Lease.

The Gold Creek Homestead Complex referred to a group of four buildings, including the 697 m^{2} (7,500 sq ft) homestead, a stone and timber cottage, a buggy shed, and an entertainment and function centre (formerly a machinery shed). The Gold Creek Homestead Site was a 41-hectare (100-acre) parcel of land, specifically Blocks 1 and 2, Section 23 Ngunnawal upon which the aforementioned complex was situated.

Gold Creek Homestead was at one time at the centre of Gold Creek, a sprawling 1,594-hectare (3,940-acre) rural property, the largest in the Ginninderra district. Portions of the former property are or will be occupied by parts of the suburbs of Ngunnawal, Nicholls, Harcourt Hill, Moncrieff, Casey, Kinlyside and Taylor as well as large parcels of land in NSW adjacent to the village of Hall. the site then became abandoned for a little while, leaving teenagers to explore it during the night. It was then put up for sale after it was declined to be heritage listed.

== History ==
=== Rolfe family ===
Edmund Rolfe, Gold Creek's founder c.1895

In 1849 Anthony Rolfe, an English farm labourer, arrived in Australia from Oxborough, Norfolk, England with his wife and five children. The family migrated to the new colonies under one of the Bounty schemes subsidised by the British Government and was part of the wave of free settlers to follow the convict era.

After working for 10 years as a tenant farmer at Joseph Kaye's Springbank rural property, Anthony established his own property, Tea Gardens, on 130 hectares (320 acres) of land in 1857. The remnants of that homestead are located in present-day Ngunnawal near Ginninderra Creek which is now part of the Gungahlin Lakes Golf Course.

Anthony's second eldest son Edmund Rolfe spent his early working life as a teamster, transporting building materials, e.g. sandstone, wool, wheat, and even drinking water from and to as far afield as Camden and Braidwood. He was the principal transport contractor for the tower reconstruction work on St John the Baptist Church (in present-day Reid).

Edmund Rolfe's first wife, Margaret (née Logue), died during childbirth in 1867, and he later married Margaret O'Keefe. Edmund Rolfe fathered 14 children—Bryan (b. 1862), Maria (b. 1864), Mary (b. 1865), Catherine (b. 1867), Anthony (b. 1868), William (b. 1869), Alice (b. 1871), Bridget (b. 1873), Margaret (b. 1874), James (b. 1876), Patrick (b. 1878), Gertrude (b. 1880), John (b. 1882), and Edmund George(b. 1884).

Anthony Rolfe financed the initial purchase of 60 acres (24 ha) of land, which abuts the present-day Gold Creek Homestead Site, and transferred the land title as part of a much larger 320-acre (130 ha) parcel to his son Edmund in 1872. During its first few decades, Gold Creek was devoted to cropping predominantly wheat, and later the Rolfes diversified into merino sheep and later still beef cattle

Gold Creek c.1907 (Partial)

The Rolfes were major beneficiaries of the depression of the 1890s. Rising mortgage rates left many farmers servicing bank loans at rates of seven, eight, and even ten percent. With their previous mortgages paid out, the Rolfes were better placed than most. With five fit young men carrying out a program of cropping, animal husbandry, and sheep grazing activities, the property remained profitable while neighbouring farms floundered. When one of the Rolfes' long-time neighbours forfeited on their mortgage payments in 1897, they snapped up the land.

The superior quality of the Gold Creek livestock was underlined by a purchase concluded in December 1903. Mr E. Hudson, the manager of the Duntroon estate, paid £2100 for 2100 merinos and 900 lambs. They used the cash to secure mortgages on further land purchases. Over a period of several years, he snapped up at foreclosure sales various parcels of land, extending his family's land holdings. By 1907 the Rolfes presided over a rural property 3,940 acres (1,590 ha) in size, the largest in the Ginninderra district.

Edmund Rolfe was very active in local politics in the two decades prior to the Federation of the Commonwealth of Australia in 1901. He served for a number of years as the treasurer and later the vice-president of the Ginninderra Protection Union, the forerunner to the Protectionist party. He was also a committee member of the Ginninderra Agricultural Show, the forerunner to Canberra's Royal National Capital Agricultural Show.

The Rolfes also hosted a number of balls and dances at Gold Creek in support of St. Benedict's, a Catholic girls' school in Queanbeyan. Edmund Rolfe was a fundraiser for Ginninderra St Francis Church and its replacement, Hall's St Xaviers Church.

The Gold Creek Rolfes were amongst a handful of local farming families, including Frederick Campbell (of Yarralumla) that lobbied the Federal Government for improved compensation during the land acquisition process in the lead-up to the creation of the Federal Capital Territory (now the Australian Capital Territory).

=== Bruce family ===
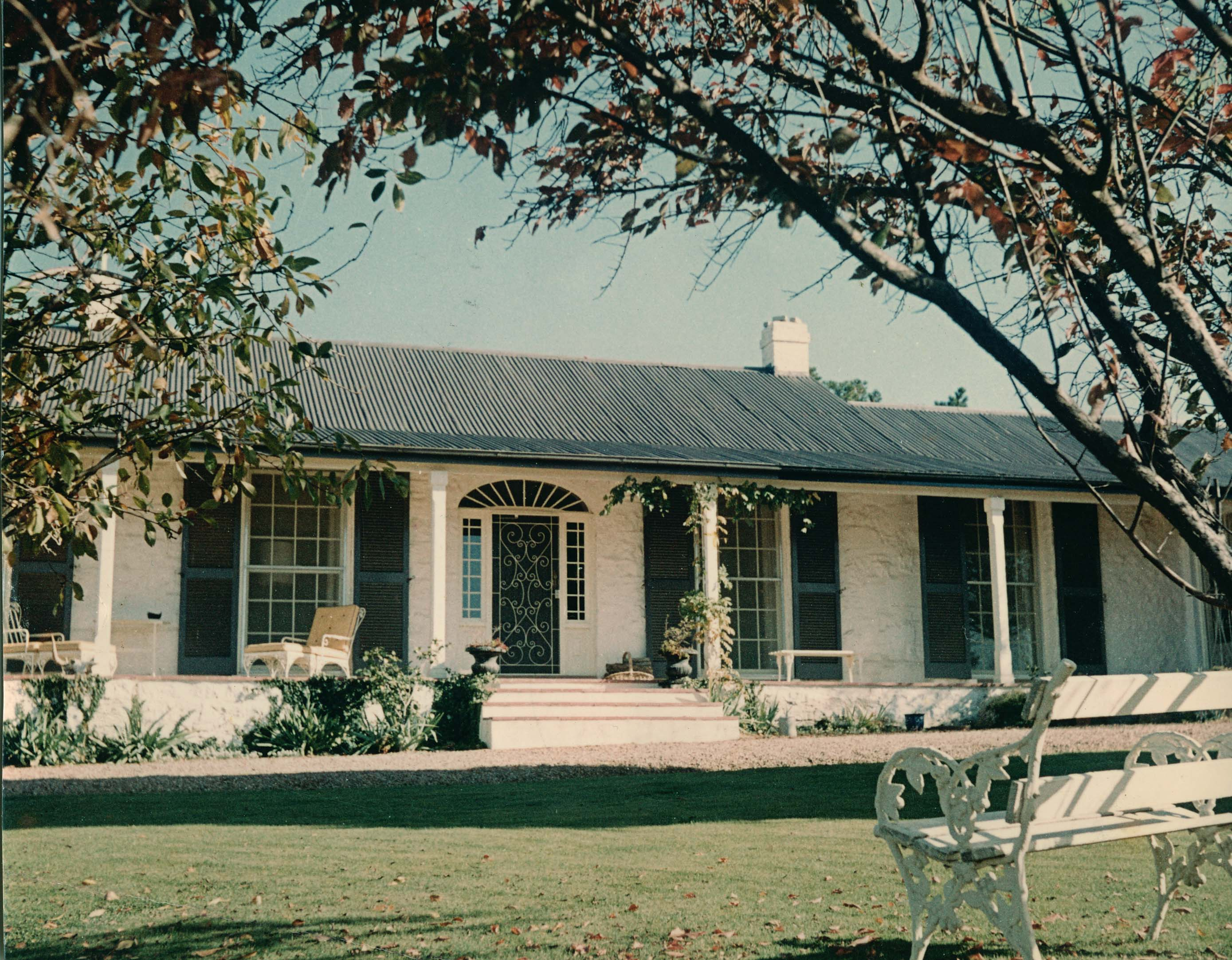
Gold Creek Homestead c.1970s

John Bruce was responsible for introducing scientific farming practices based on Agricultural Science at Gold Creek during the 1960s. A substantial program improved efficiencies and drought-proofed the property. As a result of measures such as these, Gold Creek produced first-cross ewes (merinos mated with Border Leicesters), which were then much sought after by prime lamb producers in the Cowra region. The progeny of these ewes were excellent 'prime lambs,' which yielded higher than average percentages of meat and, accordingly, achieved better sale prices.

Ten earthen dams were constructed to capture water runoff and arrest soil erosion, and provide water for stock. Today, the traffic roundabout at the corner of Gungahlin Drive and Wanganeen Avenue marks the location of a subterranean bore, a key component of this strategy. In 1967, the Bruces sunk an artesian bore, the centrepiece of an elaborate water reticulation system. From the small pump house directly above the bore head, a 9 horsepower (6.7 kW) diesel engine pushed a column of bore water 1,000 yards west to a 20,000-gallon concrete holding tank through very long lengths of two-inch polypropylene pipe. The water pump could completely fill the holding tank in about twelve hours. Today, this tank is located not far from Clarrie Hermes Drive in Harcourt Hill. From the tank, bore water was gravity-fed through buried pipes to 26 watering troughs. The entire reticulation system could be controlled by one person from a set of stop valves located in the machinery shed.

The Bruces also oversaw the planting of more than 1,000 trees across the rural property. Australian natives, especially the Tasmanian blue gum (Eucalyptus globulus) found favour with the Bruces, though the vast majority of the species planted were European ornamentals. The list of species included poplars (Populus canadensis), Monterey pines (Pinus radiata), pencil pines (Athrotaxis cupressoides), pussy willows (Salix discolor), silver spruces (Picea engelmannii), black walnuts (Juglans nigra), golden elms (Sassafras albidum), silver birchs (Betula pendula), quince (Pseudocydonia sinensis) and white oaks (Quercus arizonica).

During the early to mid-1970s the Federal Government terminated the leases on a number of rural homesteads including Lanyon, Cuppacumbalong and Gold Creek. The government intended to issue a commercial lease for the use of the 16 hectares encompassing the Gold Creek Homestead Site (3).

=== Gold Creek Pty Ltd ===
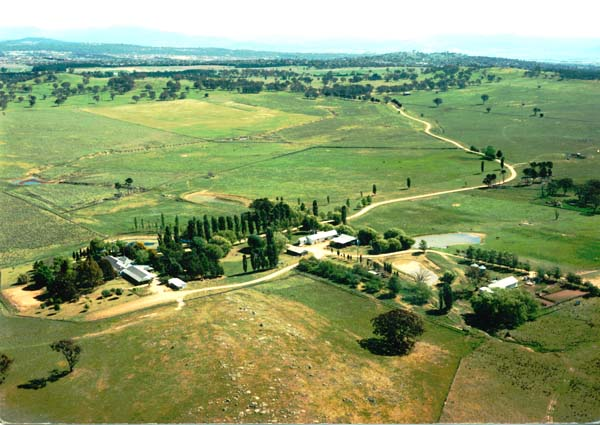
Aerial view of Gold Creek Homestead Complex c.1980s looking towards present-day suburb of Nicholls

In 1977 a group of Canberra business people pooled their finances to redevelop Gold Creek Homestead as a reception and function centre. The rural-style venue, which was to become amongst the first of its type in the Canberra region, hosted more than 7,000 wedding parties during its heyday through the 1970s, 1980s, and into the early 1990s. The hayshed complex was also converted for use as a function centre. Many public service and social club celebrations were held in the hayshed over a twenty-year period. A partnership led by Australian national soccer player John Warren acquired the business in 1979. Gold Creek hosted the national rodeo and country music events in 1981 and 1982.

In late 1977, David Templeton and two other former partners of Gold Creek Pty Ltd bought the Red Hill Hereford Stud, a cattle breeding business located near Finley in southern NSW. Established in 1966, Red Hill Stud's breeding stock was top notch. Initially the partners transported their prize bulls to Gold Creek to prepare them for show and eventual sale. The Red Hill Hereford Stud won a swag of blue ribbons at Agricultural Shows in Canberra, Sydney and regional NSW. Its success led to a series of cattle breeders' field days at Gold Creek held in conjunction with the Australian Hereford Society that attracted society members from around Australia.

During 1987/8, Gold Creek Pty Ltd began discussions with Japanese developer Kumagai Gumi Co. Ltd to partner up for an 8-hole golf course development. Detailed plans were prepared for a condominium-style development. The go-ahead for the project depended on ACT Government approval which was ultimately not forthcoming. While the 'Gold Creek Golf Estate' didn't see the light of day, in a major touch of irony, the government put its considerable financial backing behind the Gold Creek Country Club, a golf course development that bears, some would argue, striking similarities to the plans submitted by John Warren.

=== Decline ===
Heritage Listing Proposal

In the early 1990s the ACT Government progressively withdrew rural leases in the Gungahlin district ahead of construction work on the suburbs of Ngunnawal, Nicholls and Harcourt Hill. The Gold Creek Homestead business fully expected that land planners would retain a respectable buffer zone between the Homestead Site and surrounding houses to cater to extra noise. By 1994, a long timber paling fence stretched along the northern, eastern, and western boundaries of the now 41 hectare Gold Creek Homestead site, while to the south, a two-metre high earth noise barrier was erected alongside Gungahlin Drive. With the majority of the construction work finished, bookings for the Gold Creek hayshed began to recover by mid 1995. Soon after, noise complaints from nearby houses during a nighttime function in the entertainment led to a suspension of live music at Gold Creek. The ACT Government commissioned a consultants' report which estimated the cost of noise abatement measures at $300,000. The government quickly cooled on the idea. With no willing buyers, John Warren reluctantly sold the 41-hectare property to the ACT Government for $1.25M in 1998.

The delivery of the Gold Creek Homestead site into public hands left the ACT Government with 41 hectares of land with excellent development potential. In July 2000 the Government began a first round of community consultations about future options for the site. Three months later indicative plans were unveiled for an aged care facility, medium-density housing, motel and plant nursery.

Ngunnawal residents lobbied the government for retention of the entire site for community use. They presented a petition to the Heritage Minister with more than 4,000 signatures in support of their cause but to no avail. Unperturbed, the group organised two open days at the site. The larger of the two events, held in April 2002, attracted about 1,500 people.

Later still the community group received a heritage grant to record Gold Creek's history. In March 2005 the ACT Chief Minister, Jon Stanhope, launched the book Gold Creek: Reflections of Canberra's Rural Heritage by local author Chris Newman at Gold Creek Homestead.

=== Heritage Nomination Rejected for a second time ===
In late 2005 a portion of the historic site was nominated for inclusion on the ACT heritage register. (See diagram to the right). The nomination addressed two specific criteria: Criterion (d) The site is highly valued by the community or a cultural group for reasons of strong or special religious, spiritual, cultural, educational or social associations. The name Gold Creek and, by extension, the site, have retained a strong resonance within the local Gungahlin community. The name has subsequently been appropriated by a local golf course, tourist precinct, high school, and commercial businesses, which trade on the strong associations engendered in the name Gold Creek. Criterion (h) the site has strong or special associations with a person, group, event, development, or cultural phase in local or national history. The Gold Creek Homestead site has a special association with individuals and events, namely Edmund Rolfe (and the Rolfe family, which still resides in the Canberra region) that helped shape local history, including the transition to Australia's Federal Capital Territory.

The nomination was rejected in June 2009.

=== Retirement Village Development ===
At the beginning of 2014 construction began on an over 55's community on a 6.23-hectare (15.4-acre) parcel of land at was previously the western end of the Gold Creek Homestead site. This site is being developed by Lend Lease Retirement Living.

The village will comprise 161 villas and community facilities and is expected to be completed by 2019.
