= Nicholls, Australian Capital Territory =

Nicholls
- Suburb
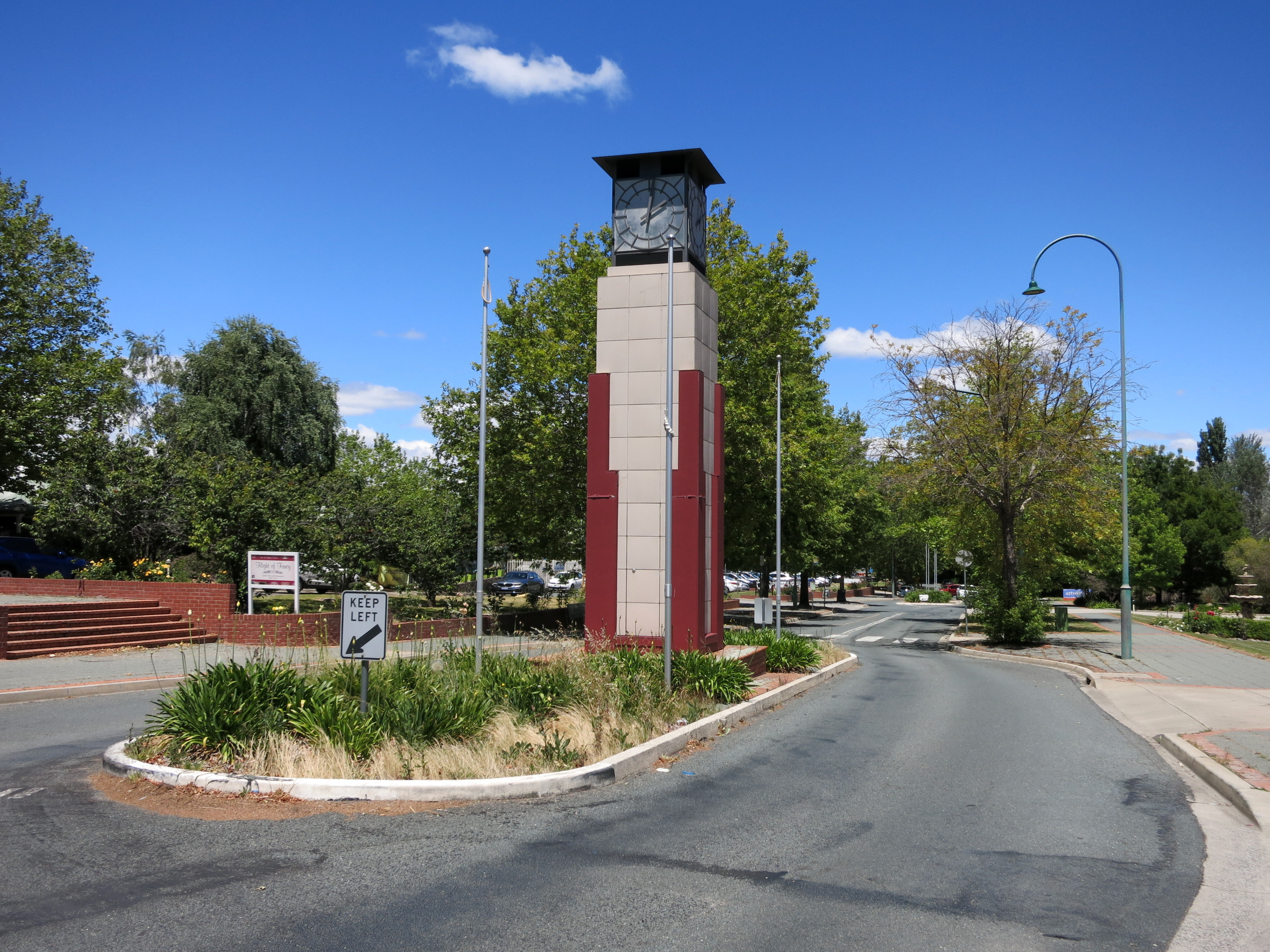
- O'Hanlon Place, Nicholls

- Coordinates: 35°11′10″S 149°05′31″E
- Country: Australia
- State: Australian Capital Territory
- City: Canberra
- District: Gungahlin
- Location: 14 km (8.7 mi) NW of Canberra CBD; 29 km (18 mi) NNW of Queanbeyan; 91 km (57 mi) SW of Goulburn; 288 km (179 mi) SW of Sydney
- Established: 1994

Government
  - Territory electorate: Yerrabi
  - Federal division: Fenner

Area
  - Total: 6.7 km^{2} (2.6 sq mi)
- Elevation: 624 m (2,047 ft)

Population
  - Total: 6,680 (SAL 2021)
- Postcode: 2913
Suburbs around Nicholls
Kinlyside	Casey	Ngunnawal
Belconnen	Nicholls	Gungahlin Town Centre
Belconnen	Crace	Palmerston

Nicholls is a suburb in the Canberra, Australia district of Gungahlin. It was named after Sir Douglas Nicholls (1906–1988) who was born at Cummeragunja Aboriginal mission, New South Wales. Nicholls was a footballer, pastor, activist, and Governor of South Australia, 1976–1977. In line with the philosophy of naming Canberra's streets, those of Nicholls are named after sportspeople. The suburb incorporates a large shallow body of water, designated Gungahlin Pond, with The Lakes golf course and the greatest number of residential streets on one side and a small cluster of residential streets, the "pondside promenade", named after birds, on the other. There is no direct connecting road between the two.

Nicholls adjoins the suburbs of Kinlyside, Casey, Ngunnawal, Crace and Palmerston. The suburb is located approximately 2 km from the Gungahlin Town Centre and about 13 km from the centre of Canberra.

== Local facilities ==
Some of the most prestigious houses in Nicholls are located against Harcourt Hill to the west. Also in Nicholls is the Senior Site portion of Gold Creek School, Perce Douglas Memorial playing fields, Nicholls Neighbourhood oval, Holy Spirit Primary School and Gold Creek Primary School. Although the suburb of Nicholls is newly established, this northern portion of the suburb including the Gold Creek School is sited on what was until 1990, the former 'Gold Creek' rural property with the Gold Creek Homestead at its centre. The Gungahlin Pond is located in the east of the suburb, near the southern end of the Lakes Golf Club. A Canberra Nature Park including Percival Hill is located further south.

== Gold Creek Village ==
Gold Creek Village is a district located on the southern boundary of Nicholls, off the Barton Highway. It encompasses Gold Creek Square, Cockington Green, the Gold Creek golf course, the National Dinosaur Museum, Australian Reptile Centre, the George Harcourt Inn and Federation Square. An online private weather station is located in Nicholls.

== History ==
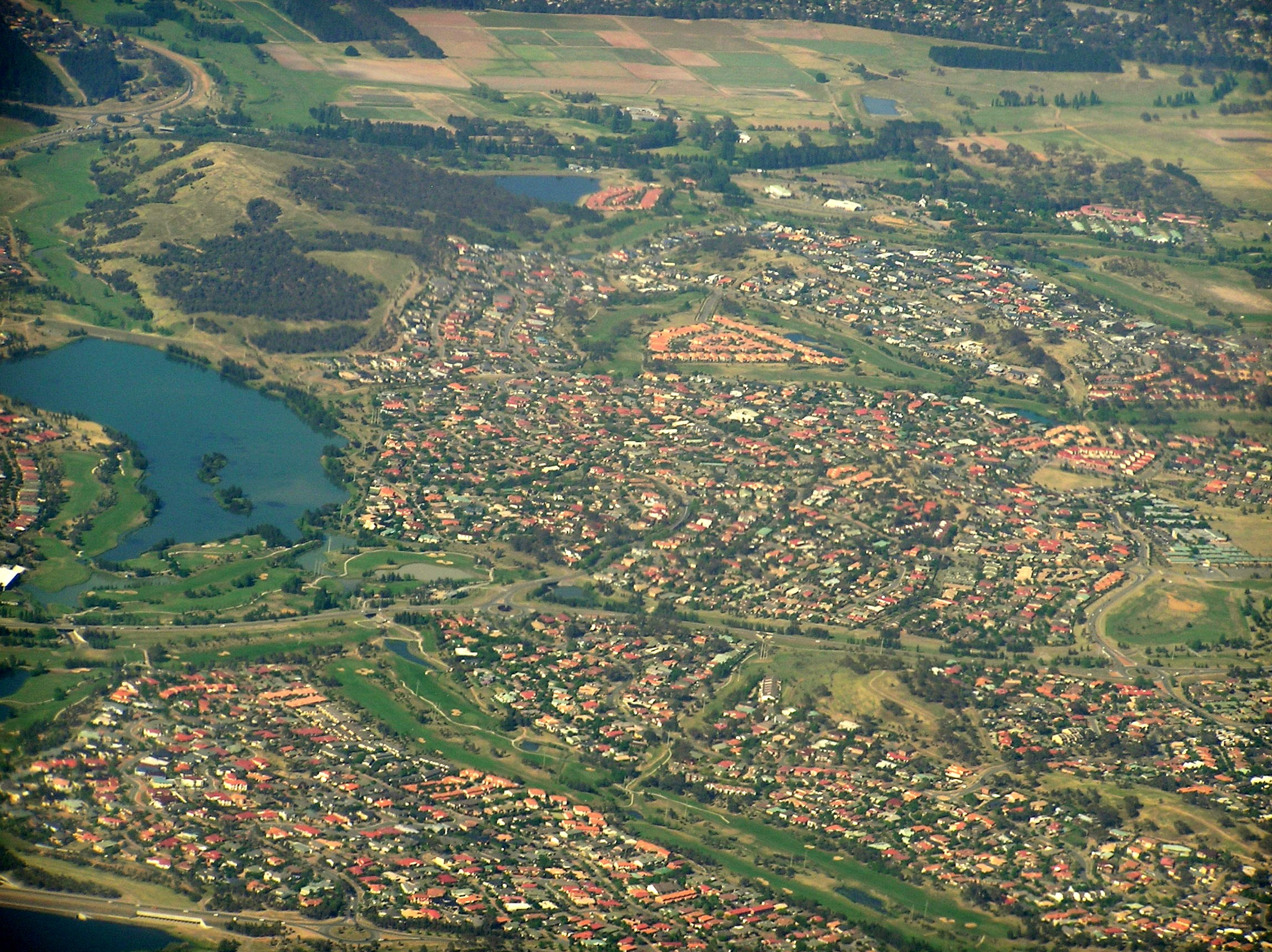
Aerial view from north in 2009

Nicholls contains the remnants of Ginninderra Village, one of the earliest settlements in the Canberra region. The settlement included the former St Francis School of Ginninderra and the historic Ginninderra Schoolhouse which was built in 1883. The village was located at the intersection of the Queanbeyan-Yass Road (now the Barton Highway) and Gold Creek Road which until the founding of the suburb of Nicholls led to the Gold Creek Homestead.

Gold Creek Square including the ACT Heritage listed St Francis Church was acquired by a local investment entity in 2004 (Global Venture Corporation Pty Ltd) with a plan for development of the site to contain a 6-star hotel resort and commercial and retail facilities. The site was sold in 2023.

In 1979, Cockington Green, a miniature English village, opened for business in Ginninderra Village. The private sector enterprise was the first of a number of tourism ventures to establish there over the coming years and in the early 1990s, the ACT government approved an application to rename the precinct Gold Creek Village. Sue Geh Circuit in Nicholls is named after Sue Geh, the former Australian basketballer.

== Demographics ==
According to the 2016 census, The top religious affiliations for the suburb of Nicholls are Catholic 27.4%, No religion, so described 27.2%, Anglican 13.8%, Not stated 8.6% and Buddhism 3.1%. The most common birthplaces in Nicholls are Australia 67.8%, England 4.0%, China 3.0%, India 1.7%, New Zealand 1.3% and Vietnam 1.3%.

== Churches ==
Churches: Life Unlimited Church is located at 1021 Gungahlin Drive inside St. John Paul II College.

== Schools ==
Three schools are located on the street of Kelleway Avenue. Gold Creek Primary School is located at 30 Kelleway Avenue. Gold Creek High School is located at 130 Kelleway Avenue. Holy Spirit Catholic Primary School is located at 26 Kelleway Avenue. The shared campus between Holy Spirit & Gold Creek primary is at 30 Kelleway Avenue. St John Paul II College is located at 1021 Gungahlin Drive, Nicholls.

== Lakes Golf Course ==
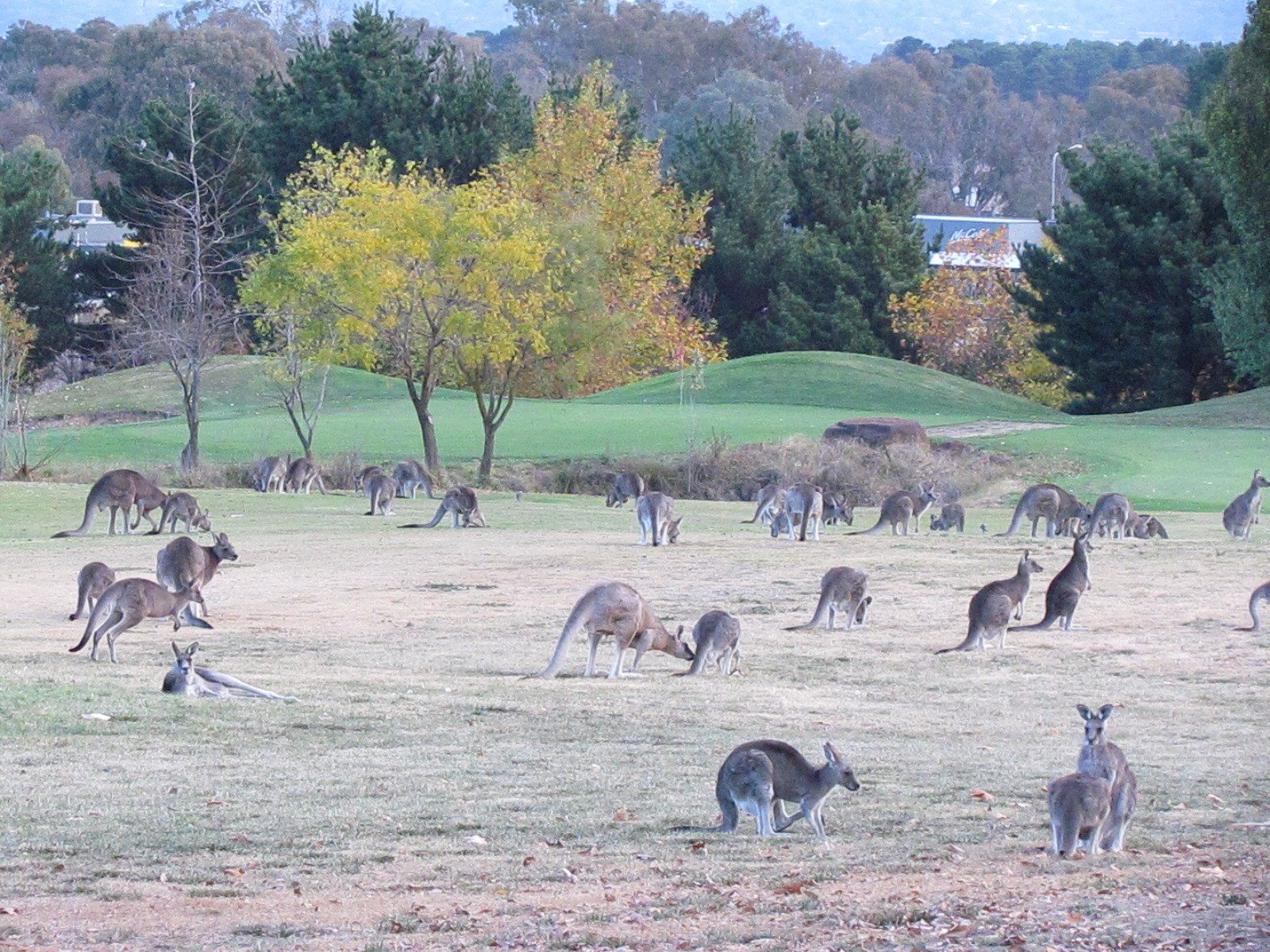
Kangaroos on golf course, Gold Creek

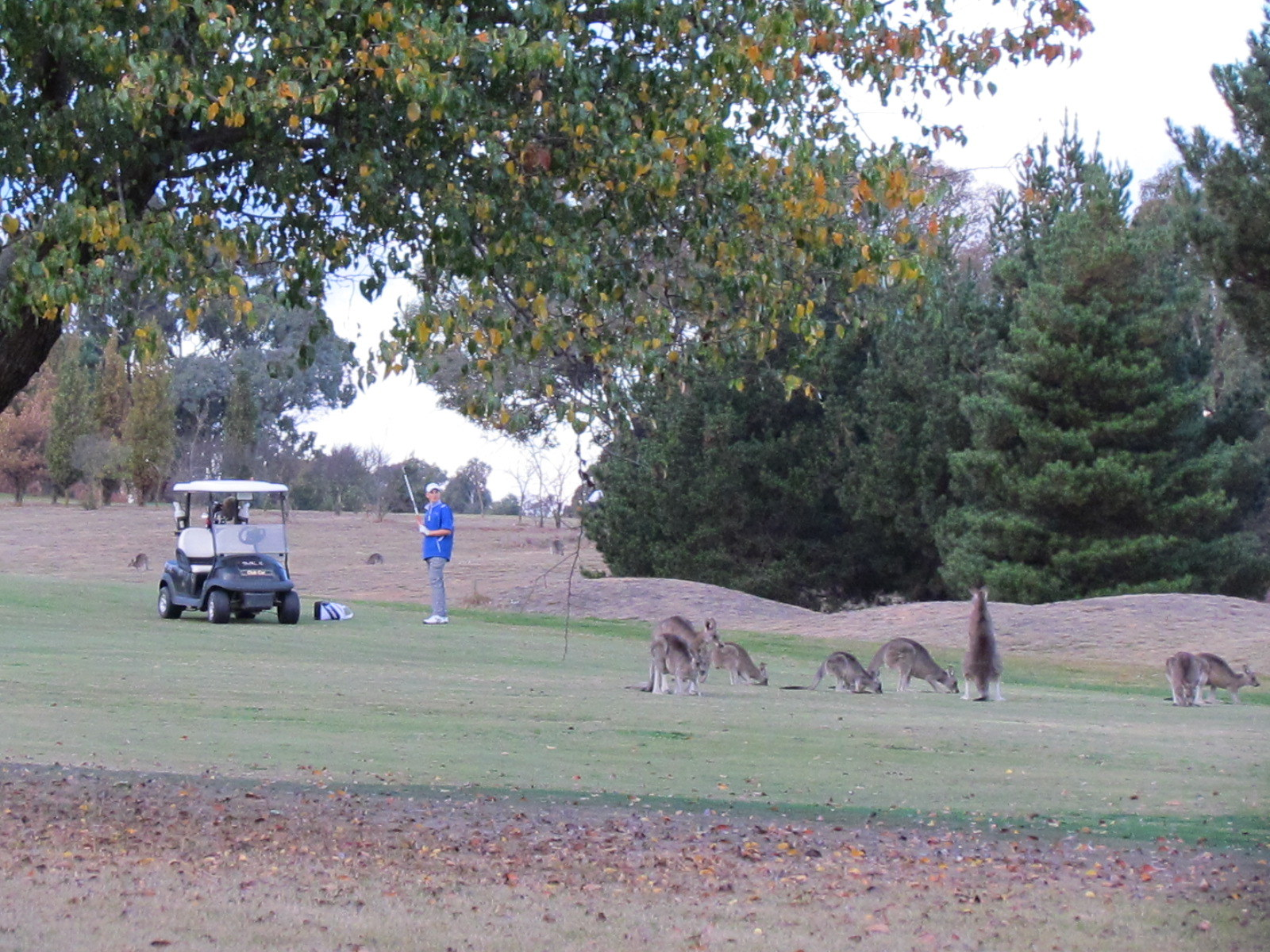
Kangaroos can be an extra hazard

The Lakes is a championship par 72 hole golf course measuring 6,198 metres and was originally designed by Ted Parslow. The Lakes Golf Club has over $1m being spent on the course each year over the past few years. The Lakes from 2006 to 2011 has been completely transformed and has undergone significant improvements which have been managed by Jamie Dawson ( https://sagca.org.au/fruition-for-gungahlin-lakes-a-capital-vision-realised ) who was involved with Ted Parslow's original design concept. From 1998 to 2011 over $28m was spent constructing the 6,000 square metre Clubhouse, purpose built undercover corporate facilities including a private bar, toilets and locker rooms. The clubhouse design was undertaken by Wood Day Architects, and was constructed in 4 stages over a period of 13 years. It is now one of Canberra biggest licensed premises in the ACT boasting numerous bars, numerous food outlets The club has received numerous awards with its CEO, Kevin Grace, being recognised with the ACT Chief Minister's award for his contribution to business in the Australian Capital Territory.

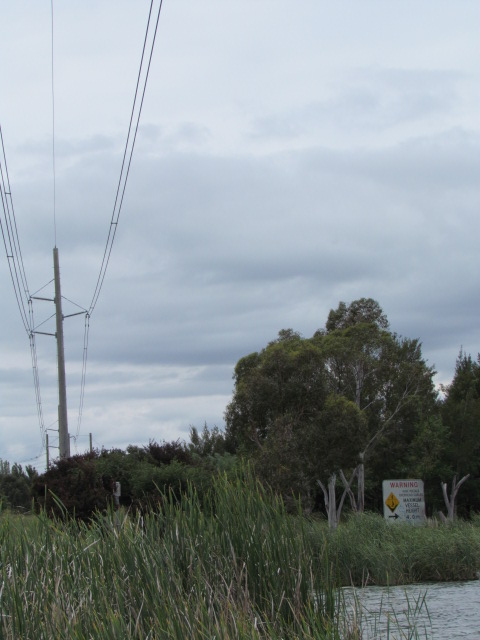
West bank of Gungahlin Pond, Nicholls, ACT

The Lakes golf course is located amongst the Gungahlin Lakes. It sits below the 1:100 flood line. The waterways provide a water source for maintaining the golf course, minimizing potable water usage. Its new computerized irrigation system takes full advantage of the water in the lakes to ensure the course presents in excellent condition. This makes the Lakes Golf course more eco sustainable.

== Geology ==
Harcourt Hill is made up from Hawkins Volcanics mostly cream rhyolite. But in the south and west there are two patches of green-grey dacite and quartz andesite. A fault forms the south east boundary of the Hawkins Volcanics. A porphyry outdrops through most of the centre of Nicholls, this is green grey dacitic intrusive, with white feldspar phenocrysts. Over to the east side of the suburb there is Canberra Formation slatey shale and mudstone, then State Circle Shale, then micaceous Black Mountain Sandstone making up Percival Hill. An anticline forms the ridge of Percival Hill, with an overturned syncline on the western slopes. In the north east side of Nicholls the corner Vee shaped outcrop of tuff comes in from Ngunnawal, and also the base of the crook shaped ashstone outcrop.
