= Cockington Green Gardens =

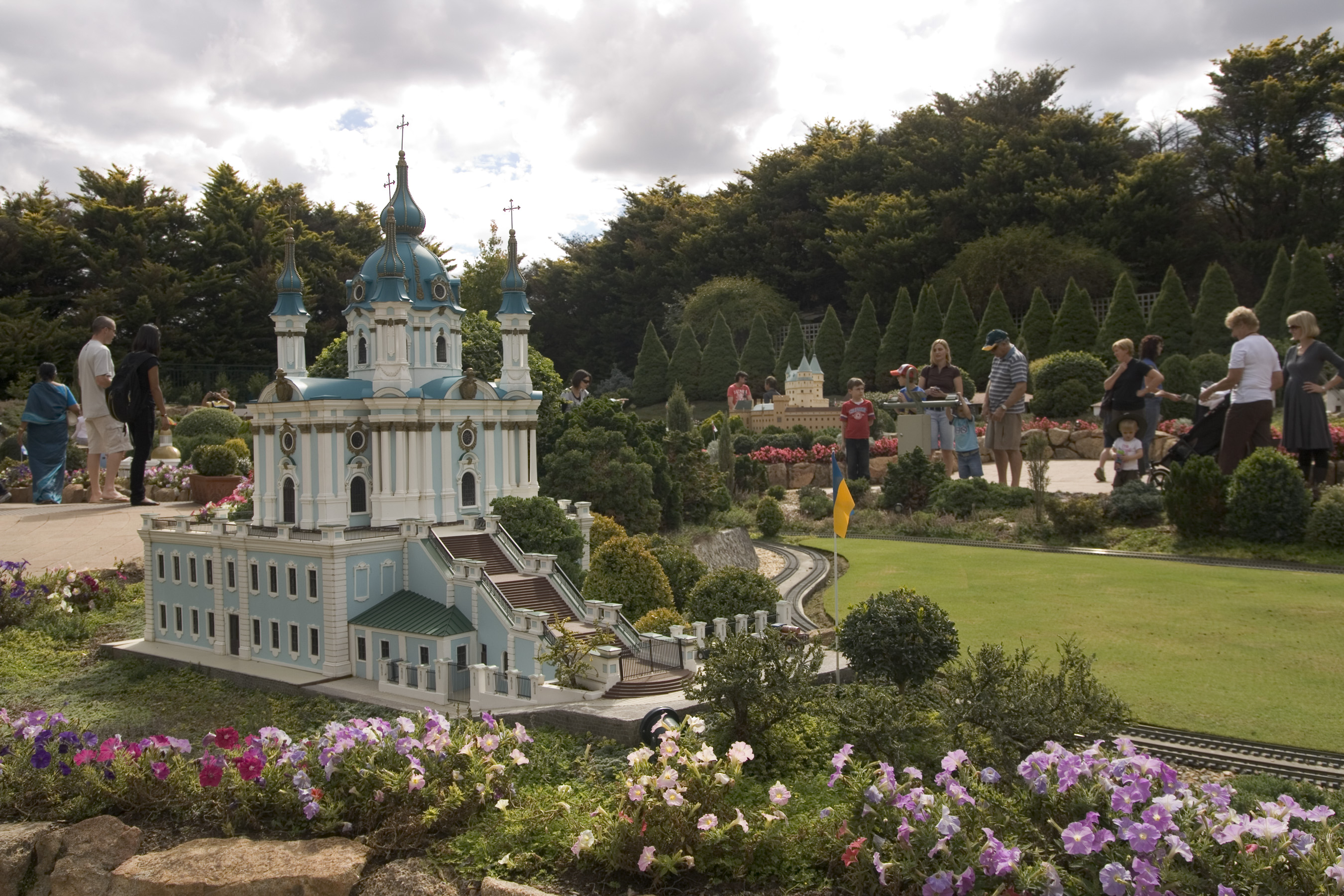
- Interactive map of Cockington Green Gardens
- Location: Canberra, Australia, Gold Creek Village
- Coordinates: 35°11′30.62″S 149°5′13.01″E
- Opened: 1979
- Website: www.cockingtongreen.com.au

Cockington Green Gardens is a park of miniatures, situated in Nicholls, Australian Capital Territory. Doug and Brenda Sarah had the idea to create a miniature village in 1972, and Cockington Green was opened on 3 November 1979.

The business is family owned and operated, incorporating over four generations.

On 28 September 2023, four people were injured when a miniature train derailed due to excessive speed.

== Gallery ==
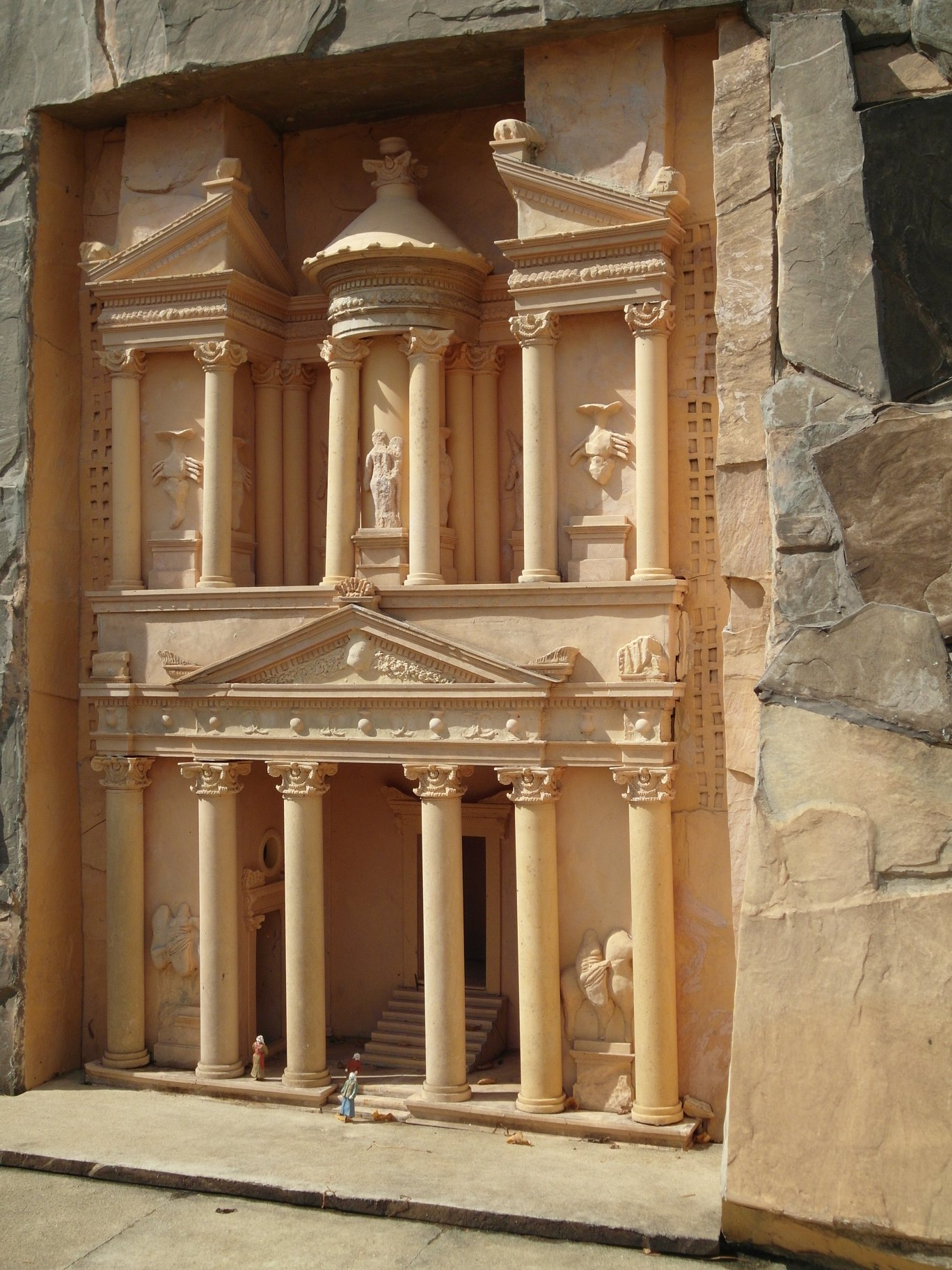
Al-Khazneh in miniature

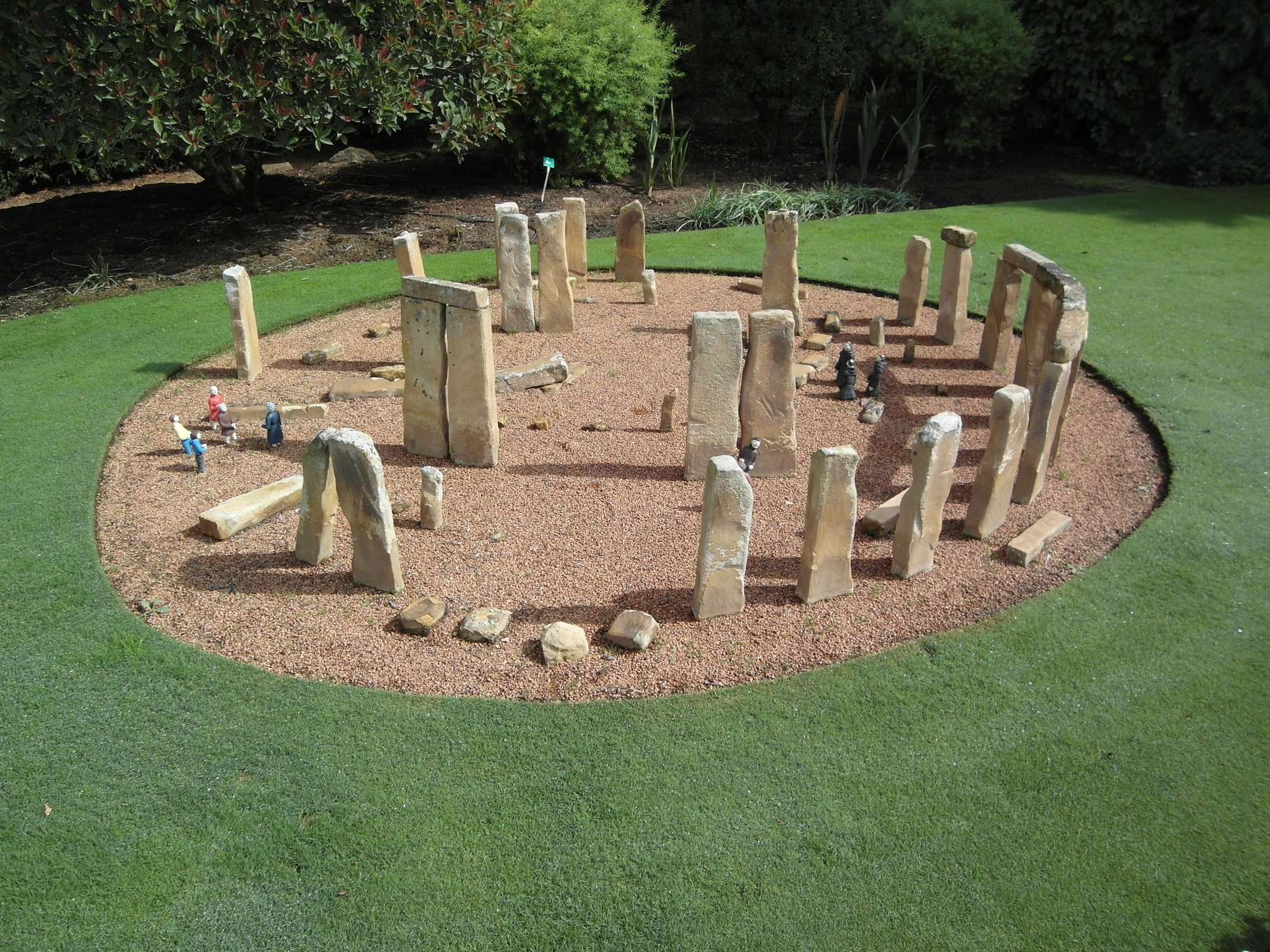
Stonehenge miniature

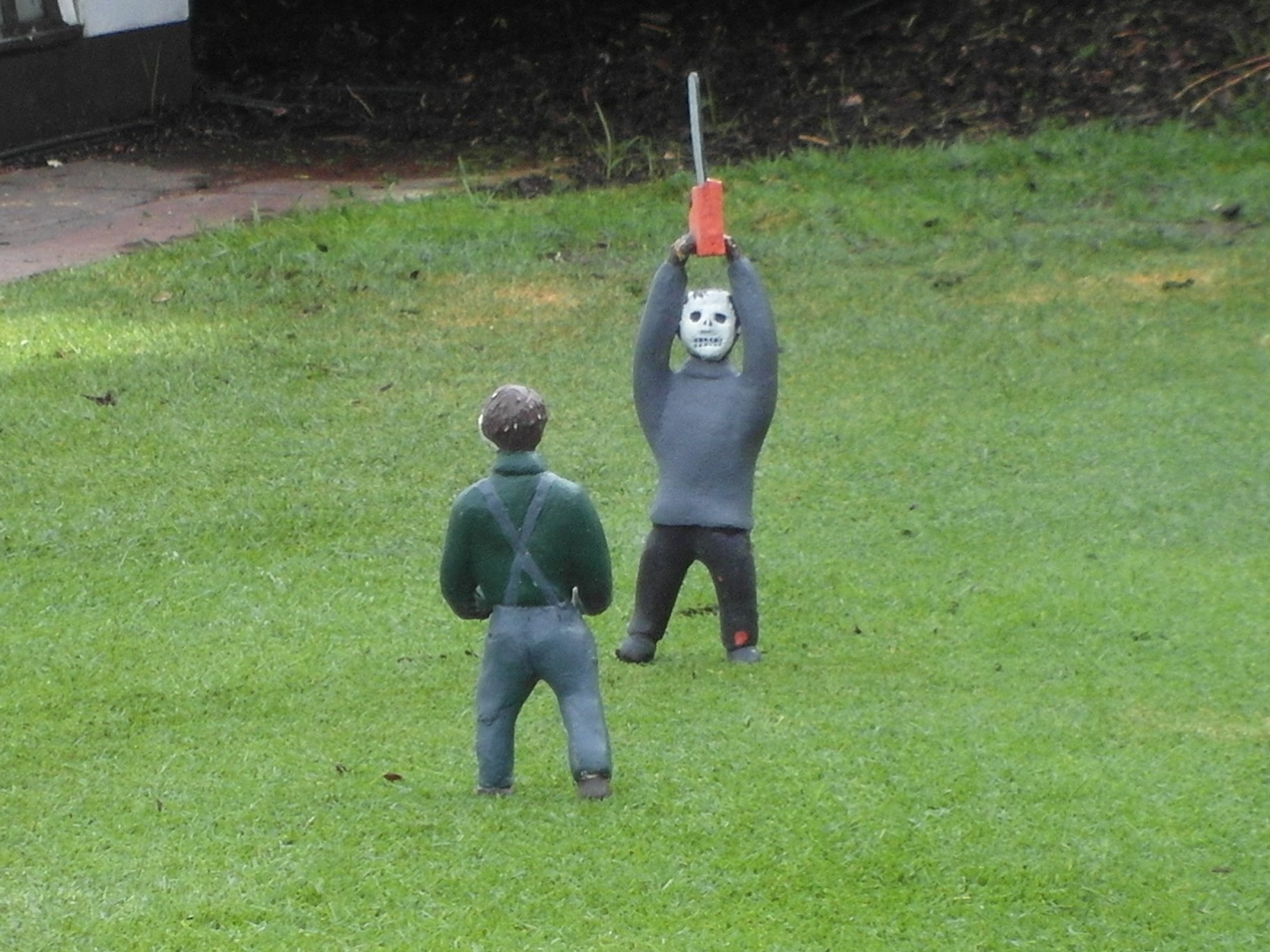
Jason Voorhees with chainsaw, from the Friday the 13th films

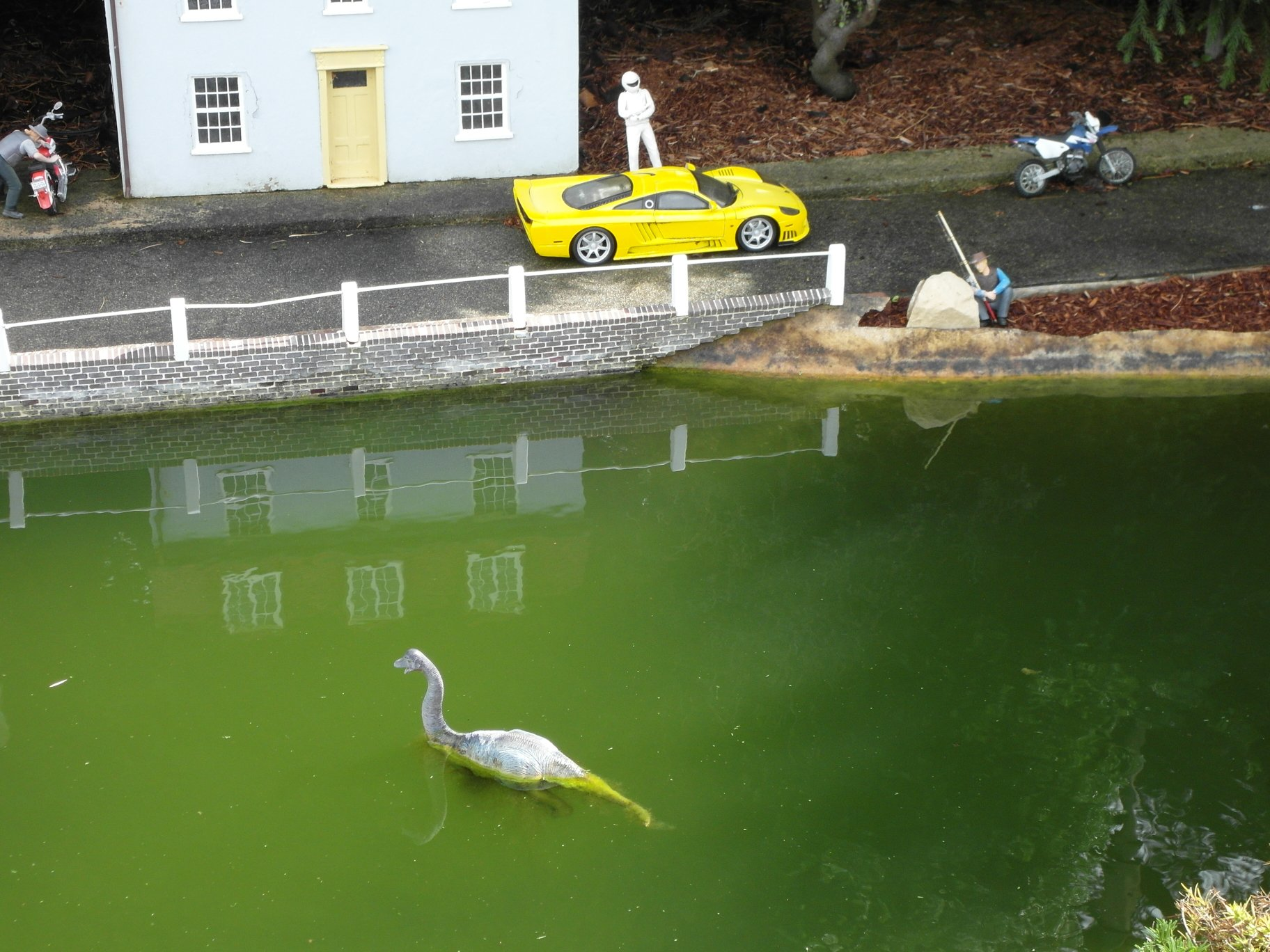
The Stig and the Loch Ness Monster
