= Thomas H. Shepherd =

English painter

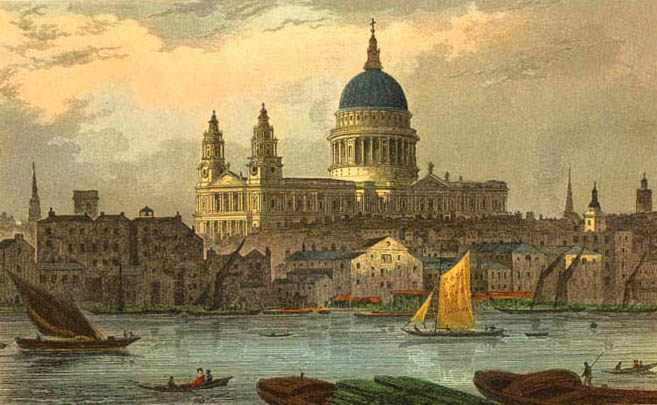
St Paul's Cathedral

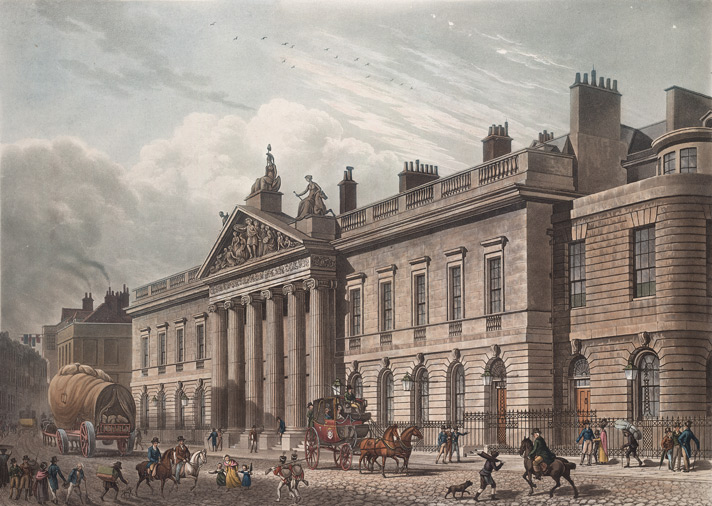
View of East India House

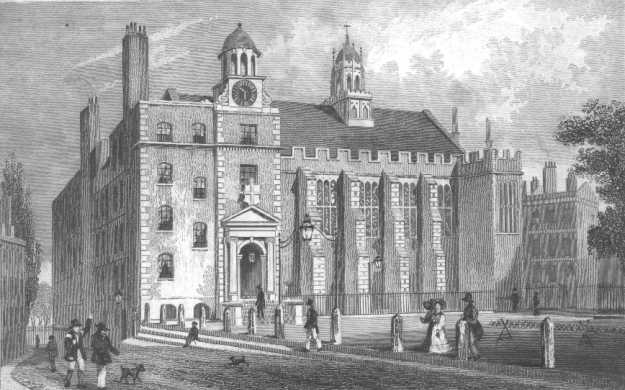
Middle Temple Hall 1830.

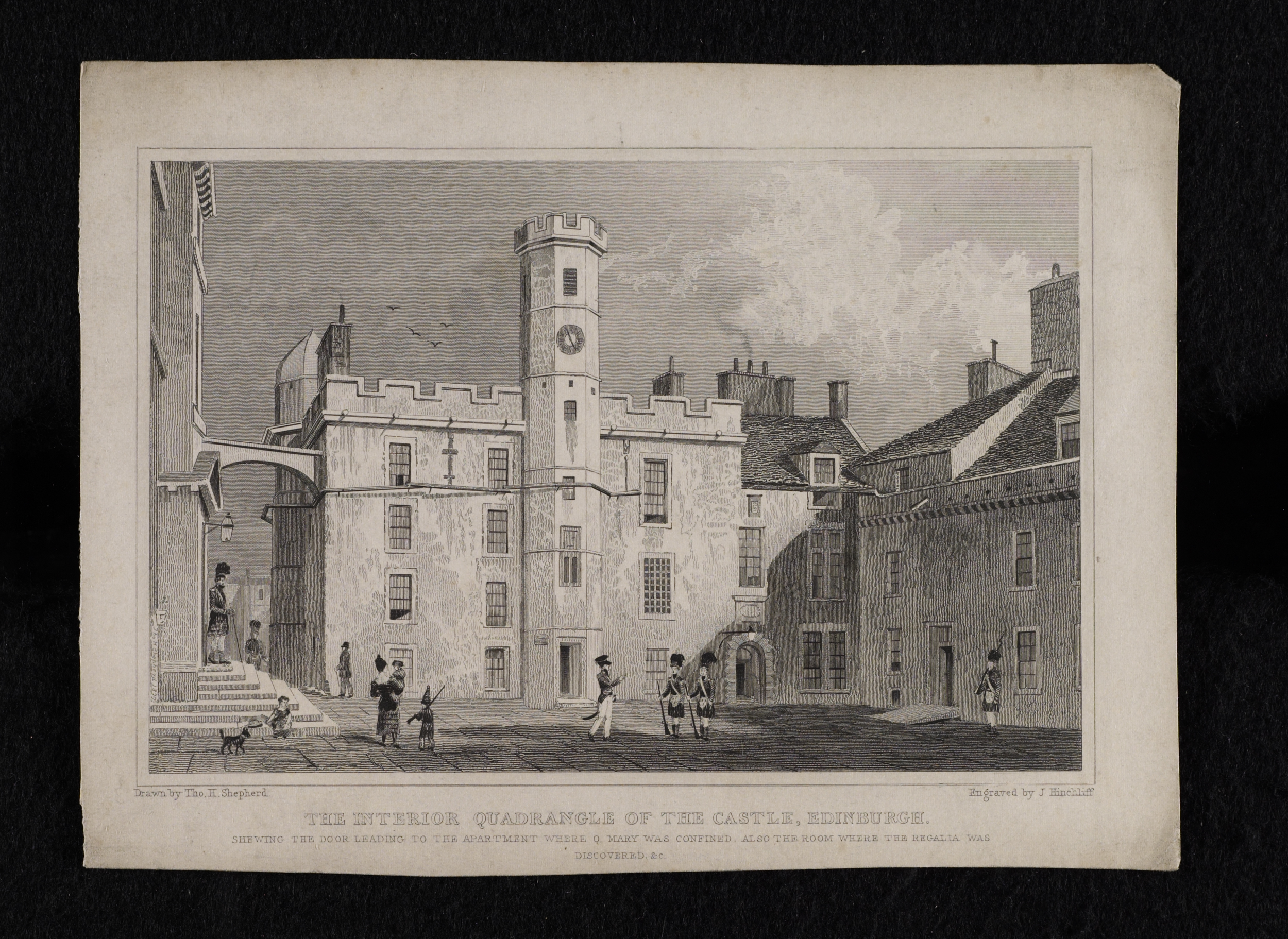
Historic view of The Royal Palace in Crown Square at Edinburgh Castle

Thomas Hosmer Shepherd (16 January 1793, France – 1864) was a British topographical watercolour artist well known for his architectural paintings.

== Life and work ==
Thomas was the brother of topographical artist George "Sidney" Shepherd, Thomas was employed to illustrate architecture in London and later Edinburgh, Bath and Bristol. His paintings were the basis for steel engravings in many books (see bibliography).

Shepherd's work, mostly topographical, is characterized by an attention to detail, along with lifelike scenes that contain people, carriages, and horses. His first acclaim came with Metropolitan Improvements, a publication of modern London architecture commissioned by the publisher Jones & Co. He worked mostly for Frederick Crace, who employed him to paint old London buildings prior to their demolition, with much of the work surviving in the Crace collection at the British Museum.

Shepherd lived on Batchelor Street Islington, North London. His residency is marked by a commemorative plaque.

== Selected bibliography ==
- T. H. Shepherd & James Elmes. Metropolitan improvements: London in the nineteenth century (London: Jones & Co. 1827).
- John Britton & T. H. Shepherd. Modern Athens displayed in a series of views or Edinburgh in the 19th century (Jones & Co., 1829).
- T. H. Shepherd & James Elmes. London and its Environs in the Nineteenth Century (London: Jones & Co. 1831).
- John Britton & T. H. Shepherd. Bath and Bristol, with the counties of Somerset and Gloucester, displayed in a series of views, including the modern improvements, picturesque scenery, antiquities, etc. (London, W. Evans, 1831?).
- T. H. Shepherd. London Interiors (London: D. Omer Smith, 1841?)
- J. F. C. Phillips. Shepherd's London: Four Artists and Their View of the Metropolis, 1800-1860 (Cassell & Co., 1976)
