= Crace, Australian Capital Territory =

Crace
- Suburb
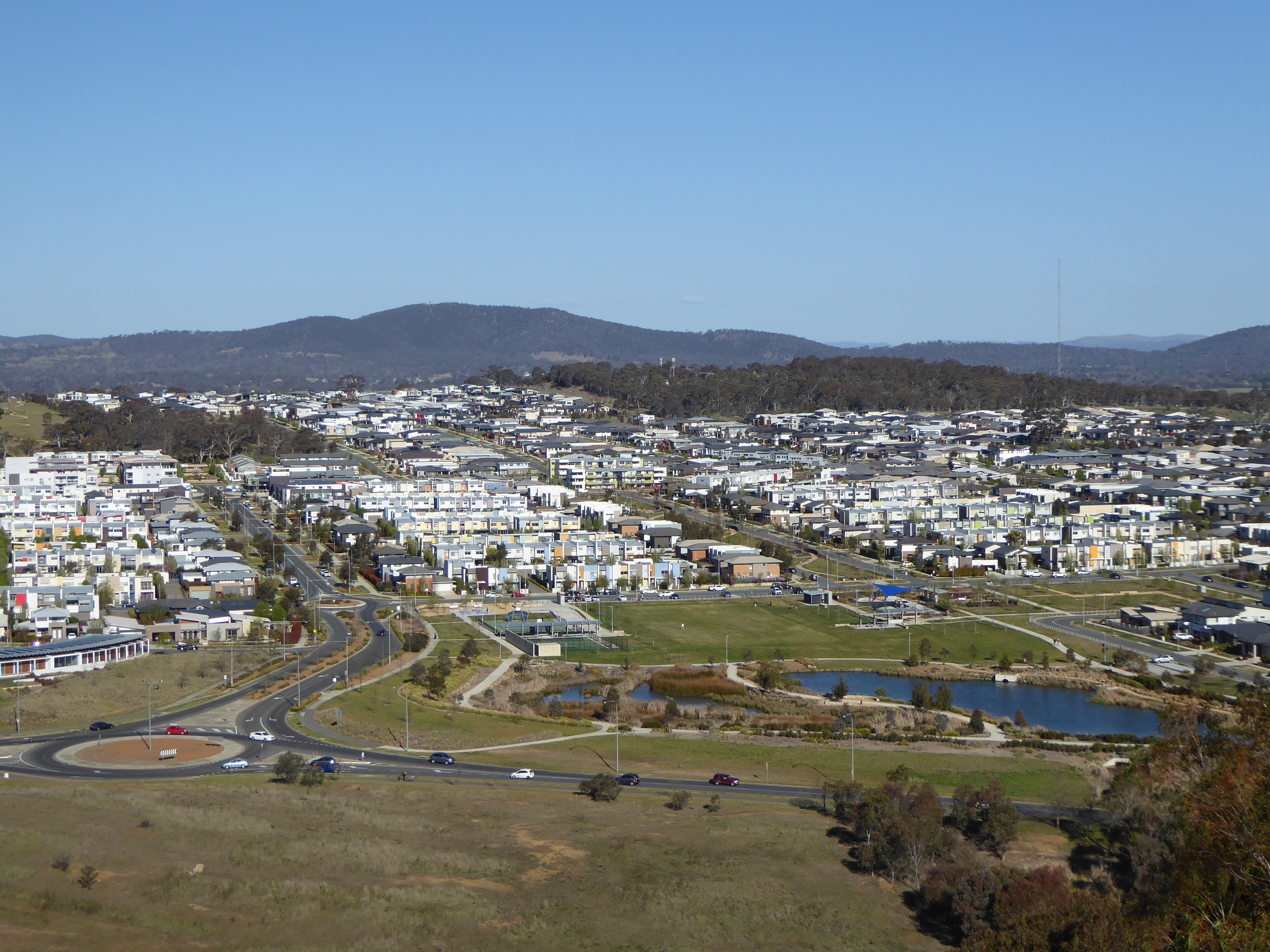

- Coordinates: 35°12′08″S 149°06′23″E
- Country: Australia
- State: Australian Capital Territory
- City: Canberra
- District: Gungahlin
- Location: 12 km (7.5 mi) NNW of Canberra CBD; 28 km (17 mi) NW of Queanbeyan; 92 km (57 mi) SW of Goulburn; 289 km (180 mi) SW of Sydney
- Established: 2010

Government
  - Territory electorate: Yerrabi
  - Federal division: Fenner

Area
  - Total: 1.7 km^{2} (0.66 sq mi)
- Elevation: 611 m (2,005 ft)

Population
  - Total: 4,800 (SAL 2021)
- Postcode: 2911
Suburbs around Crace
Nicholls	Palmerston	Franklin
Percival Hill Canberra Nature Park	Crace	Canberra Nature Park
Kaleen	Giralang	Mitchell

Crace (/kreɪs/) is a suburb of Canberra, Australia in the district of Gungahlin. It was named after Edward Kendall Crace an original settler in the Gungahlin area. Streets in Crace are named after parishes and land divisions from colonial times. It is bounded by the Barton Highway, Gundaroo Drive, Nudurr Drive and Gungahlin Drive. Located in the suburb is the Canberra Nature Park of Gungaderra Grasslands nature reserve. At the 2016 census, it had a population of 4,459.

== Development ==
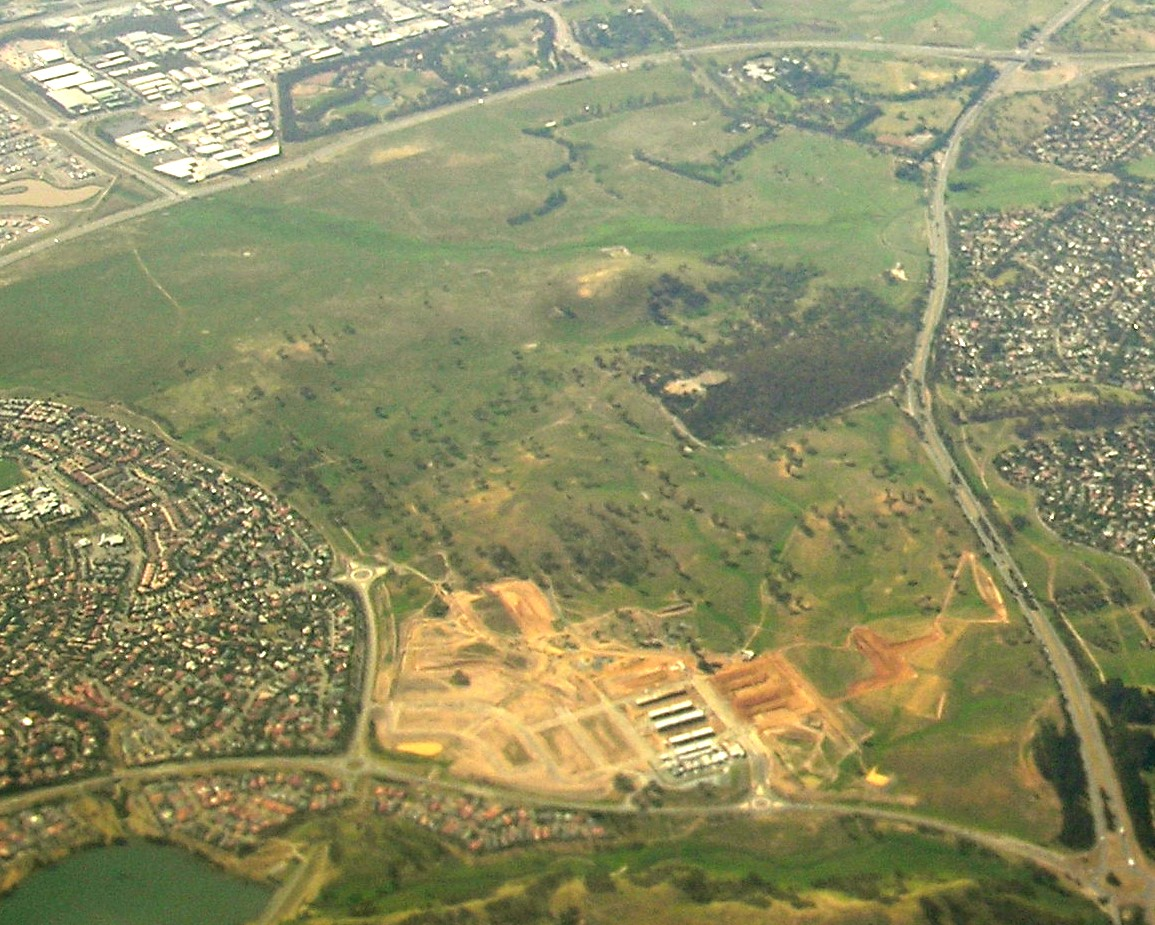
End 2009 aerial view of Crace from the west

The suburb has finished development and construction.

- Road construction commenced in July 2008.
- The construction of 21 display homes was completed in May 2009.
- By July 2012 more than half of the houses were complete.
- The majority of homes were complete by 2015.

The ACT government selected developers for the area as Defence Housing Australia and Canberra Investment Corporation. The developers were expected to make $60,000,000 but had to share half with the government. Some very small blocks were released for low cost housing with 85% released for high cost housing. 1,500 houses were planned for the 140 hectares, however more than 1,600 dwellings were built.

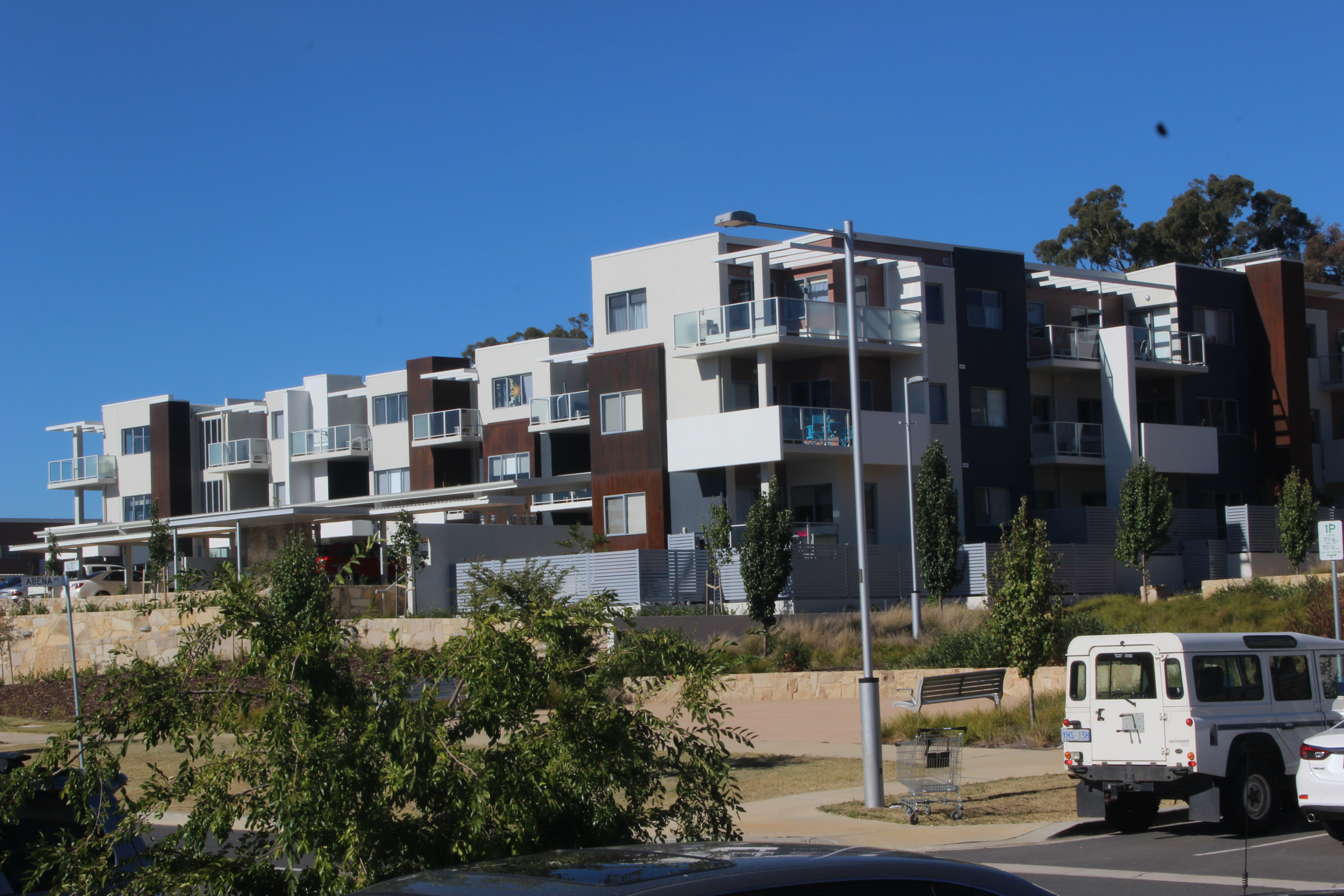
Crace in 2015

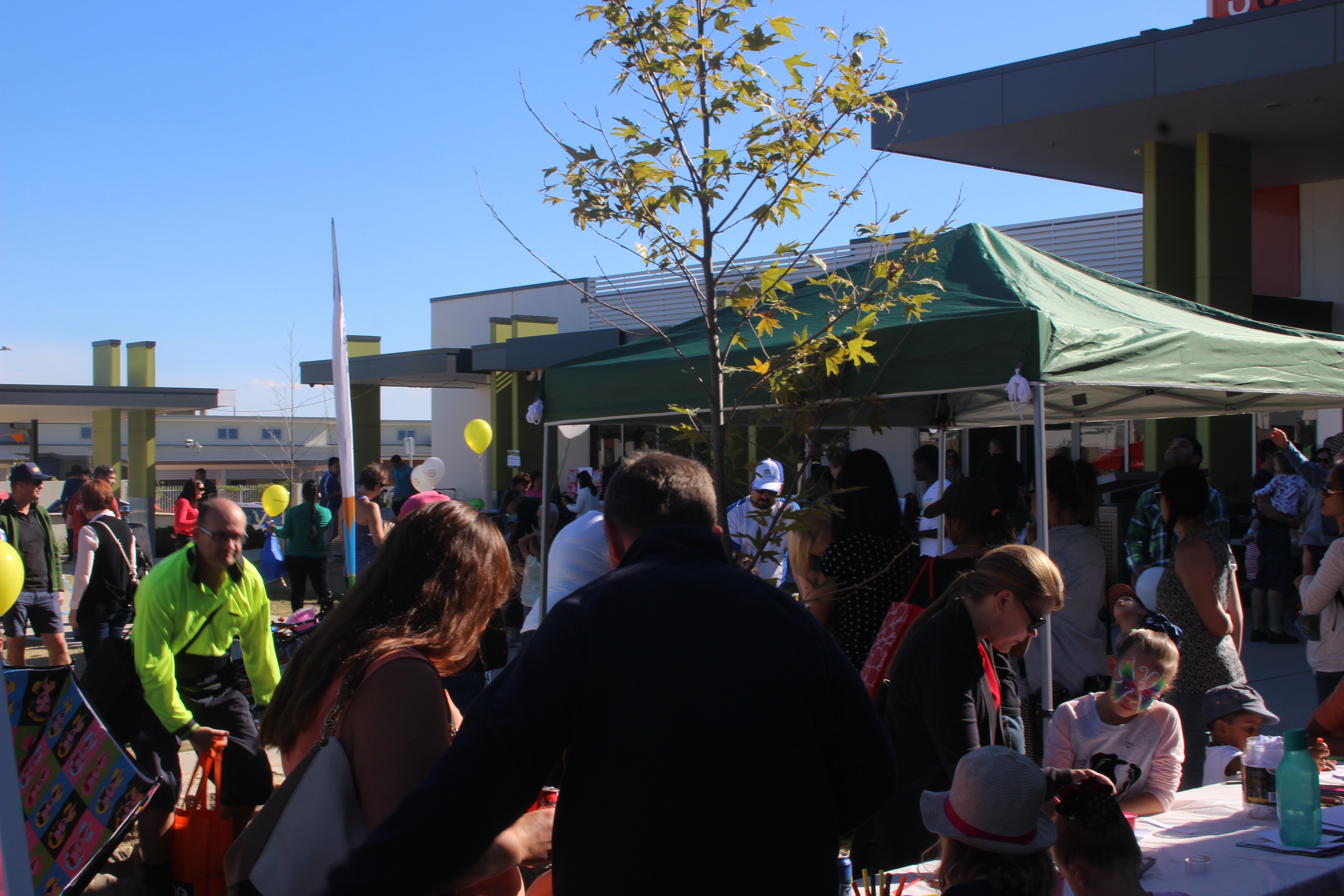
Crace shops

== Existing facilities ==
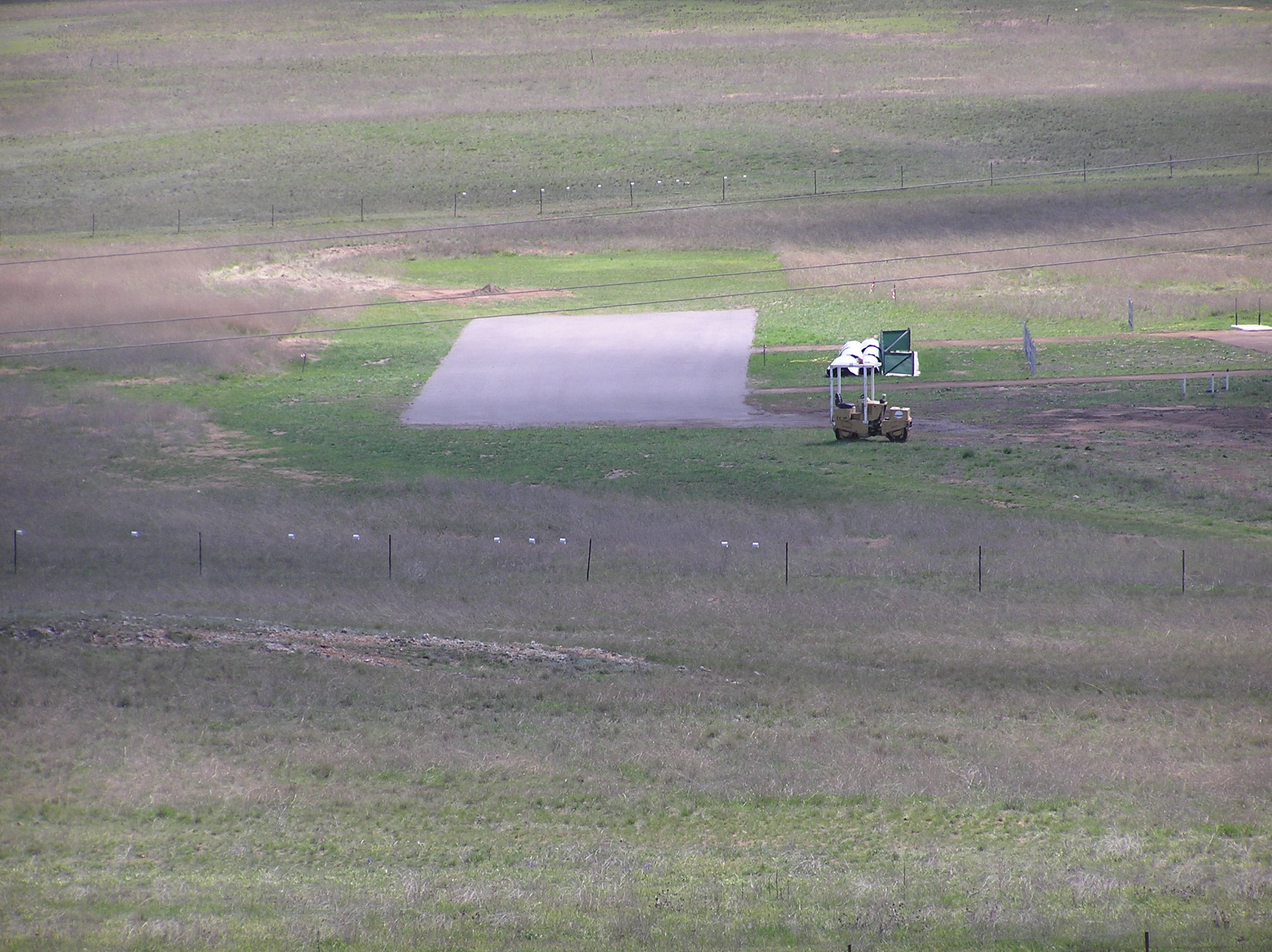
Crace Grassland Flying Field operated by the Belconnen Model Aero Club

The suburb also encompasses Gungahlin Hill, which hosts the transmission facilities for the following radio stations:

- ABC Radio National
- 666 ABC Canberra
- 1RPH
- Mix 106.3
- 1053 2CA
- 1206 2CC
- Hit 104.7

Like the majority of new Canberra suburbs, Crace is a cat containment area: all cats have to be kept inside the cat owner's property and within an enclosure if outside.

== Geography ==
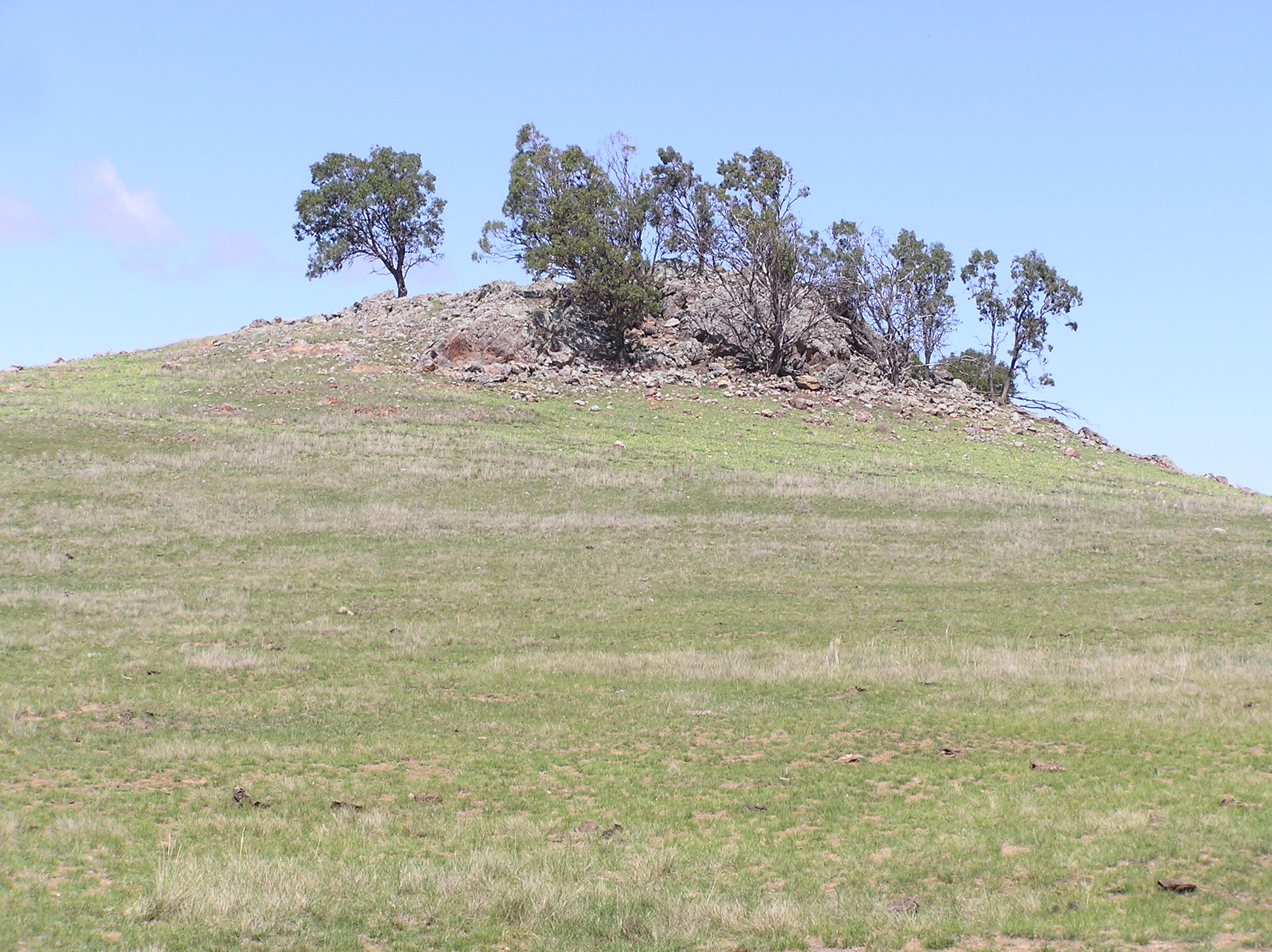
Crace Hill

Crace Grasslands Nature Reserve and Crace Hill are not completely located in Crace despite the name; their southern parts are located in the adjacent suburb of Lyneham. It also has a CSIRO Sustainable Ecosystems area.

=== Geology ===
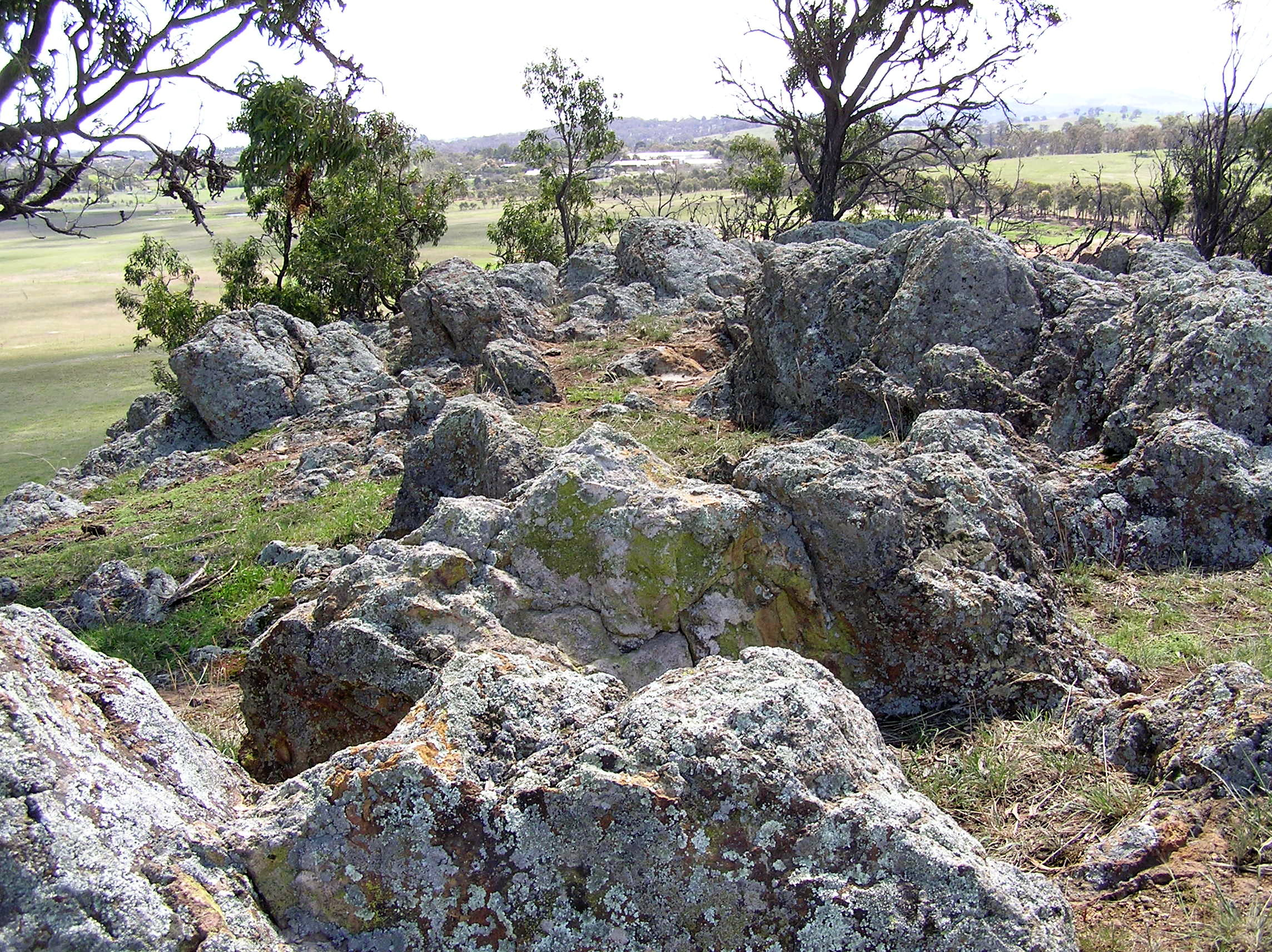
Vesicular Dacite on top of Crace Hill

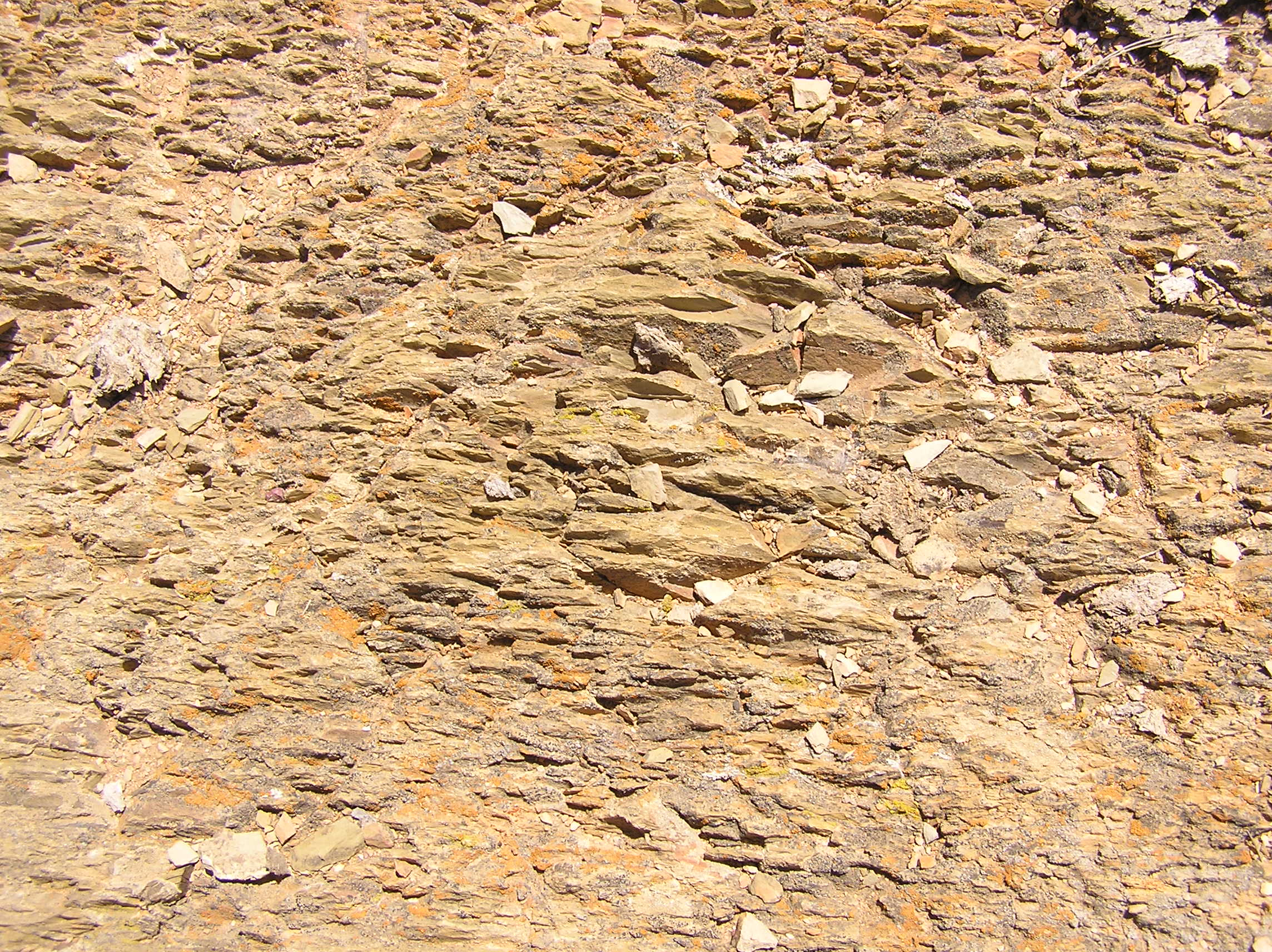
Canberra Formation siltstone found in east end of Crace

On the North west side of Crace the rock is middle Silurian age Canberra Formation slaty shale and mudstone. In the mid west is siltstone. Towards Gungahlin Hill there is some sandstone at the base of the siltstone deposit, then over an unconformity to lower Silurian age State Circle Shale, and then mudstone. On Gungahlin Hill the rocks are from the Ordovician age Pittman Formation with greywacke and bands of the Acton Shale Member. The east side of Crace also has Silurian Canberra Formation with the top of Crace Hill having vesicular Dacite overlying mudstone. Crace Hill has been designated as a geological monument. The Gungahlin Fault curves around the south east side of Gungahlin Hill, and heads north north east out of Crace. The Winslade Fault comes into the south of Crace over the top of Gungahlin Hill and curves north into Palmerston.
