= Palmerston, Australian Capital Territory =

Palmerston
- Suburb
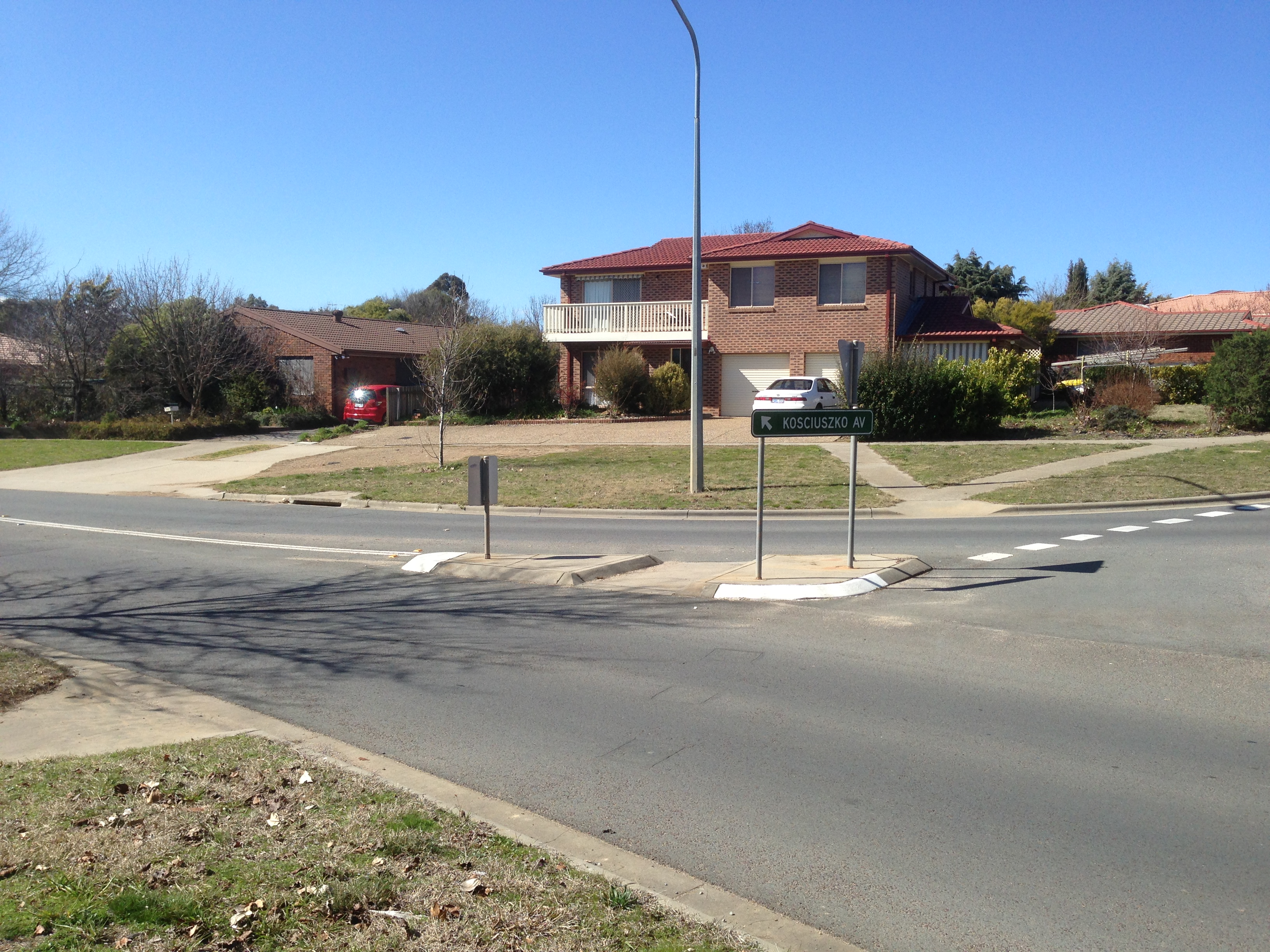
- Kosciusko Avenue

- Coordinates: 35°11′40″S 149°06′50″E
- Country: Australia
- State: Australian Capital Territory
- City: Canberra
- District: Gungahlin
- Location: 13 km (8.1 mi) NNW of Canberra CBD; 29 km (18 mi) NNW of Queanbeyan; 88 km (55 mi) SW of Goulburn; 285 km (177 mi) SW of Sydney
- Established: 1994

Government
  - Territory electorate: Yerrabi
  - Federal division: Fenner

Area
  - Total: 1.9 km^{2} (0.73 sq mi)
- Elevation: 622 m (2,041 ft)

Population
  - Total: 5,579 (SAL 2021)
- Postcode: 2913
Suburbs around Palmerston
Ngunnawal	Gungahlin	Gungahlin
Nicholls	Palmerston	Canberra Nature Park
Canberra Nature Park	Crace	Canberra Nature Park

Palmerston (/ˈpɑːmərstən/) is a suburb in the Canberra, Australia district of Gungahlin. The suburb is named after George Thomas Palmer (1784–1854) who established a settlement in the Canberra region in 1826 called Palmerville, which was later renamed Ginninderra. It was gazetted on 20 March 1991. Streets are named after mountains and mountain ranges of Australia, with the main street called Kosciuszko Avenue. It is next to the suburbs of Nicholls, Gungahlin, Crace and Franklin. It was the second suburb to be developed in the Gungahlin district, after the industrial suburb of Mitchell. It is bounded by Gungahlin drive and Gundaroo drive.

== Urban environment ==
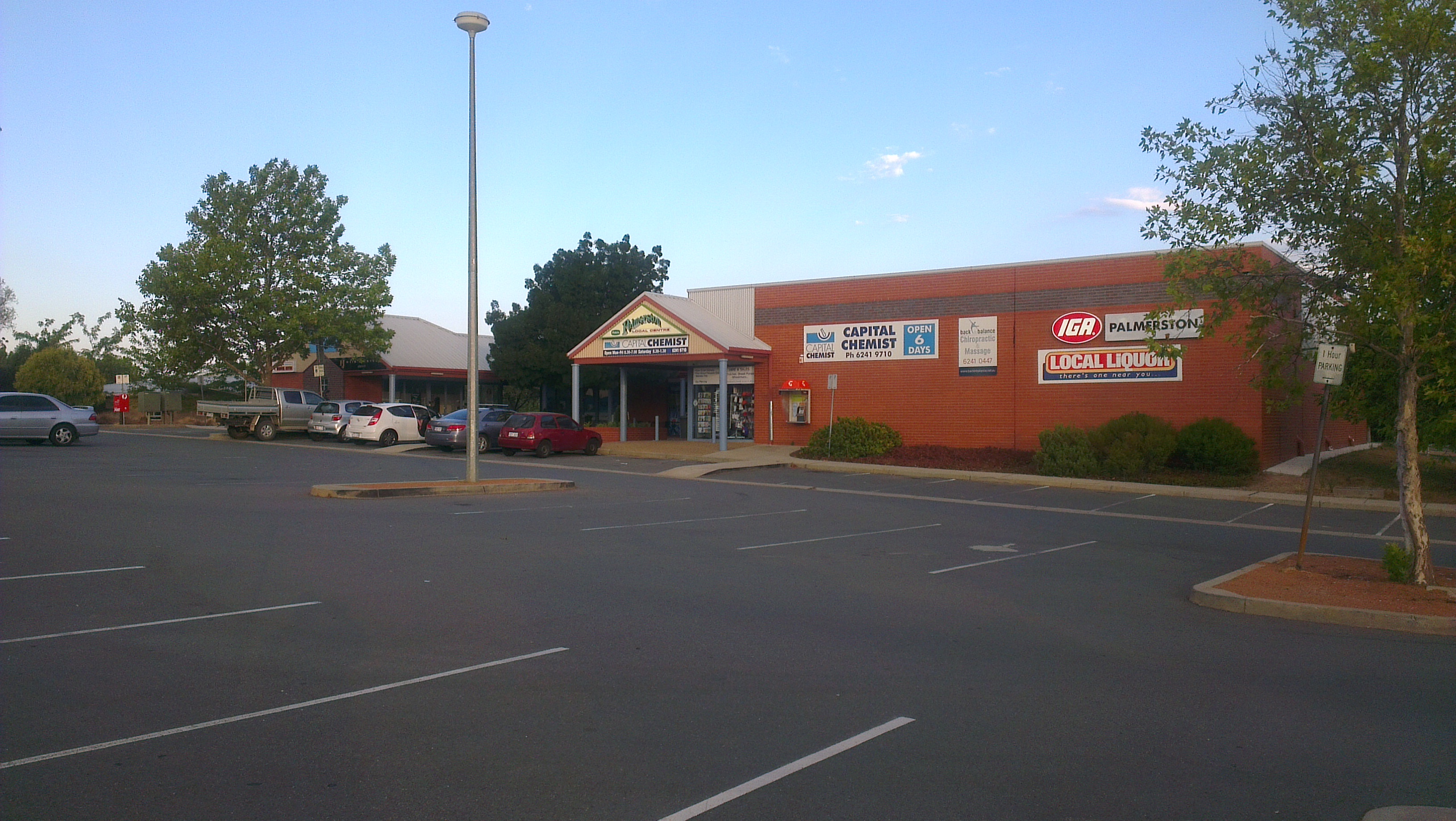
Local shopping centre in Palmerston

Palmerston is mainly a residential area with a mix of single homes and duplexes. At the centre of the suburb there are small medical, shopping and community centres. Palmerston District Primary School opened in 1995 and a large neighbourhood oval is adjacent to the school. A number of cyclepaths cross the suburb, with pedestrian and cycle underpasses at several road crossings. Fruit trees, including plums and apples are scattered along the public thoroughfares of Palmerston. ACTION bus routes 21 and 22 traverse Kosciuszko Avenue, as well as 23 and the 24 bus routes going through half of Palmerston, connecting Palmerston with Gungahlin Town Centre, Franklin and Nicholls.

== Geology ==
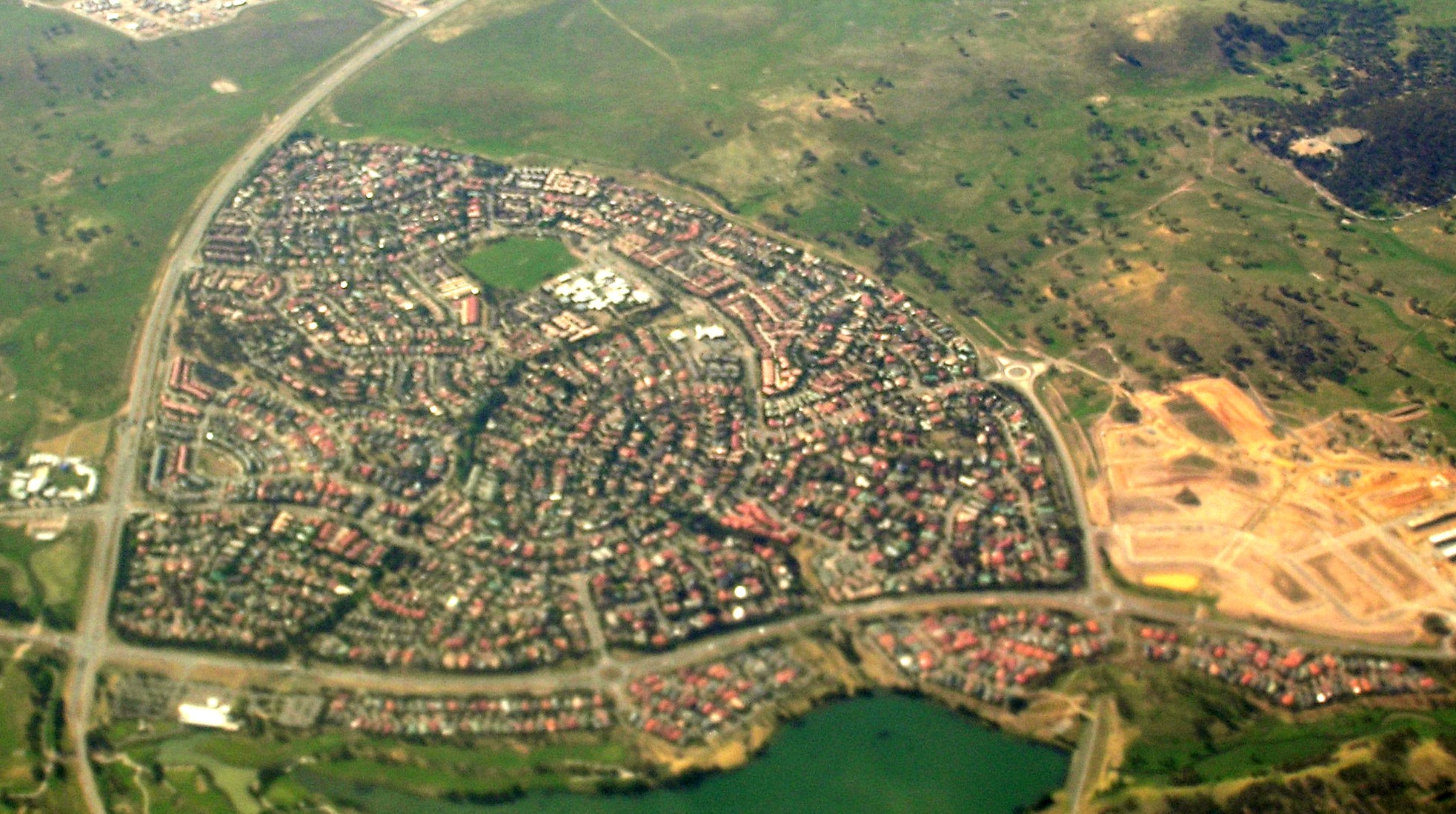
Aerial view from north west

Palmerston is underlaid by the Canberra Formation from the late middle Silurian age. The area was studied in more detail than many other parts of Canberra by J P Ceplecha from the ANU in 1971.

Mostly the Canberra Formation is slaty shale and mudstone. A layer of ashstone has been folded to form 75 metre wide exposures on the surface. These are in the shape of an ear of corn with the major axis pointing north north east. The major axis is determined by an anticline. A syncline determines the western side of the ashstone, with an anticline further to the west. A triangle of siltstone has been lifted up by faults into the western corner of Palmerston. A long fault aligned with the folds follows along the east side of Ginninderra Creek. The Winslade Fault comes in from the south heads north and joins up with the above long fault. The Gungahlin fault also parallels the folds and cuts through the east side of Palmerston. It forms the eastern limit of the ashstone.
