= Frederick Crace =

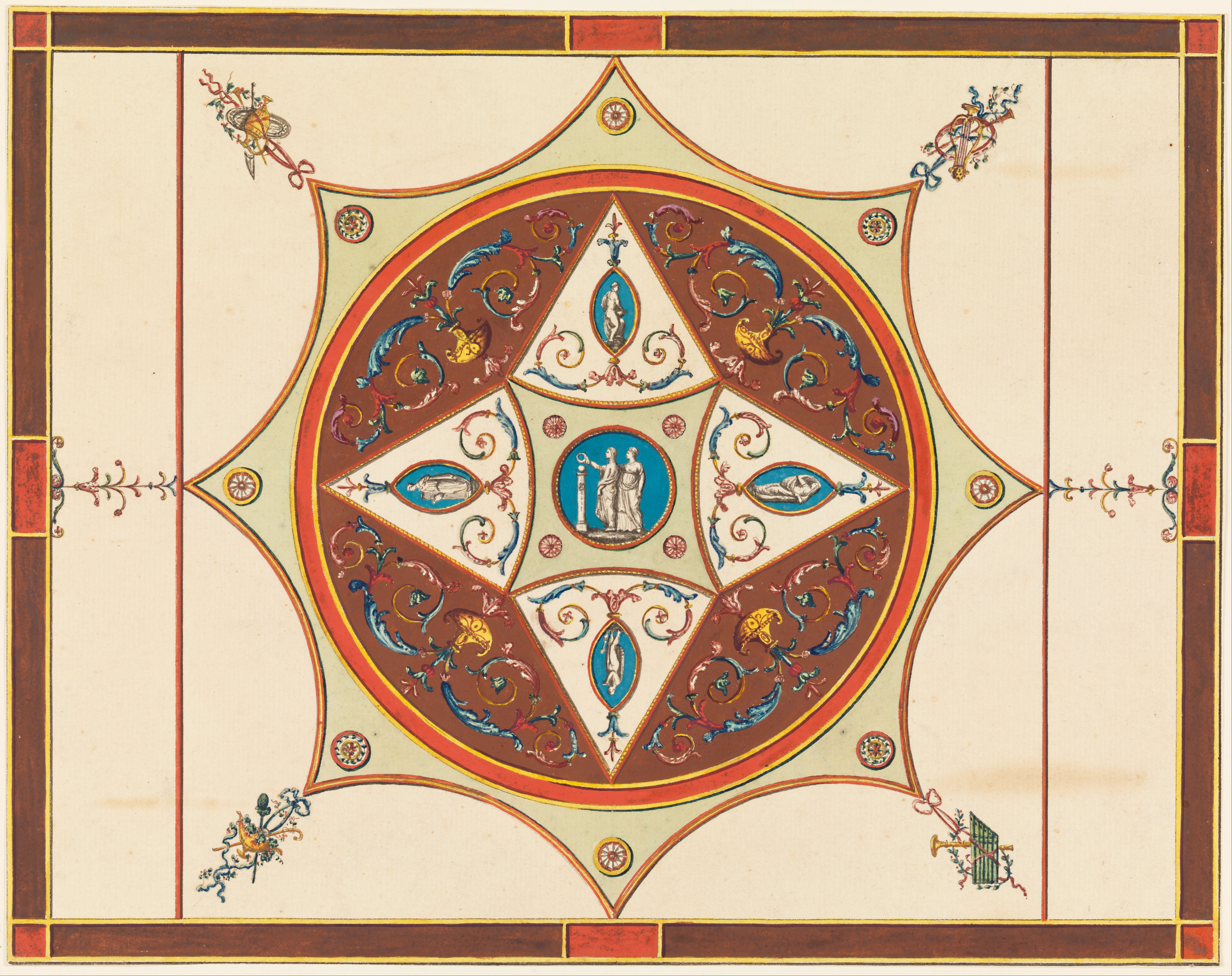
Design for a Painted Ceiling by Frederick Crace, 1815–22, at the Cooper-Hewitt, National Design Museum

Frederick Crace (3 June 1779 – 18 September 1859) was an English interior decorator who worked for George IV when Prince of Wales, for whom he created the chinoiserie interiors of the Brighton Pavilion. Crace was also a collector of maps, topographical prints, and drawings, now at the British Library.

Frederick was the son of the prominent London decorator John C. Crace (1754–1819), who had been hired in 1788 to provide Chinese works of art for the Royal Pavilion.

Beside his familiar interiors at the Marine Pavilion in Brighton, Crace provided interiors at Windsor Castle and Buckingham Palace, in which he was assisted by his son, John Gregory Crace.

Frederick married Augusta Harrop Gregory, the daughter of John Gregory, a London magistrate and treasurer of the Whig Club. In 1830, his son John Gregory became a full partner in the family business, thereafter known as Frederick Crace & Son, on inheriting property and capital from his mother, who died in 1827. Crace & Son designed the St James's Theatre, London (1835), and the younger Crace developed into a well-regarded designer of theatres on his own.

For Crace's collection of topographical prints and drawings, Thomas H. Shepherd was employed to paint old London buildings prior to their demolition to provide a historical record.

He died at his home in Hammersmith on 18 September 1859, aged 80. He was buried at West Norwood Cemetery. His extensive collection of British topography was purchased for the British Museum by his son in 1880.
