= Kinlyside =

- Suburb
- Coordinates: 35.175°S 149.082°E
- Country: Australia
- State: Australian Capital Territory
- City: Canberra
- District: Gungahlin
- Location: 15 km (9.3 mi) NW of Canberra CBD; 29 km (18 mi) NW of Queanbeyan; 94 km (58 mi) SW of Goulburn; 291 km (181 mi) SW of Sydney
- Established: 1991

Government
  - Territory electorate: Yerrabi
  - Federal division: Fenner
- Elevation: 666 m (2,185 ft)
- Postcode: 2913
Suburbs around Kinlyside
		Taylor
Hall	Kinlyside	Casey
		Nicholls

Kinlyside is a rural locality in the Australian Capital Territory. It was gazetted in 1991 as a planned outer suburb of Gungahlin. It was never released for development, and the governing Labor Party campaigned at the 2004 election and 2008 election on the policy of making Kinlyside a nature reserve instead. In 2013, it was set aside as a protected area that would remain undeveloped under an environmental offsets plan associated with increased development in Gungahlin. As of 2019, it remains a gazetted locality in the Territory Plan.

According to the ACT's Planning and Land Authority, the locality is named after George Kendall Kinlyside.

From a well known pioneer family in the Ginninderra-Hall area; followed in his father's footsteps as wheelwright, coachbuilder and blacksmith at Hall; in 1907 he built a hall which served the Hall community for many years; active in local affairs and joint secretary of the Hall Progress Association when established in 1906.

Kinlyside is bounded by the village of Hall to the west, Nicholls to the south east, by Casey to the east and Clarrie Hermes Drive to the south. The suburb's other boundaries have been surveyed but not yet established.

== Geology ==
Underneath Kinlyside are acid volcanic rocks from the middle Silurian period. These are from the Hawkins Volcanics. The hills in the west of the locality are mostly green grey dacite, and the valley bottom is mostly purple andesite covered in part by alluvium.

== See also ==
- Canberra District wine region
