= Edward Kendall Crace =

Australian pastoralist

Edward Kendall Crace (c. 1844–1892) was an Australian pastoralist who owned extensive land holdings around Canberra.

Crace was the son of the English interior designer John Gregory Crace (1809–1889) and his wife, Sarah Jane Hine Langley.

Crace owned the properties of Ginninderra and Gungahlin and added Charnwood to his holdings in 1880. He arrived in Australia in 1865 on the Duncan Dunbar after being shipwrecked. In 1871 he married Kate Marion who had also been on the Duncan Dunbar and they had six daughters and two sons. One son, Everard Crace founded a farmers union to promote more scientific farming methods, and his other son, also named John Gregory Crace became a commander in the Royal Australian Navy. Edward Crace and his coachman died when trying to cross a flooded Ginninderra Creek in 1892.

The suburb of Crace is named after him, as is Crace Street in Weetangera.
