= John Gregory Crace (designer) =

British interior decorator and author

- Crace, seated, with his son and grandson
- Born: 26 May 1809
- Died: 13 August 1889 (aged 80)
- Education: Frederick Crace
- Known for: Interior decoration
- Notable work: Interiors of Houses of Parliament; Great Exhibition
- Spouse: Sarah Jane Hine Langley
- Children: 12, including John Dibblee Crace & Edward Kendall Crace
- Patrons: King George IV

John Gregory Crace (26 May 1809 – 13 August 1889) was a British interior decorator and author.

== Early life and education ==
The Crace family had been prominent London interior decorators since Edward Crace (1725–1799), later keeper of the royal pictures to George III, established a business in 1768. John Gregory Crace, Edward Crace's great-grandson, was the elder of two surviving sons of Frederick Crace (1779–1859), interior decorator to the then Prince Regent and a collector of maps and prints. His mother, Augusta Harrop Gregory, was the daughter of John Gregory, a London magistrate and treasurer of the Whig Club.

Born at 34 Curzon Street in London, Crace was educated at the schools of Dr Crombie in Greenwich and Mr Pollard in South Kensington.

== Career ==
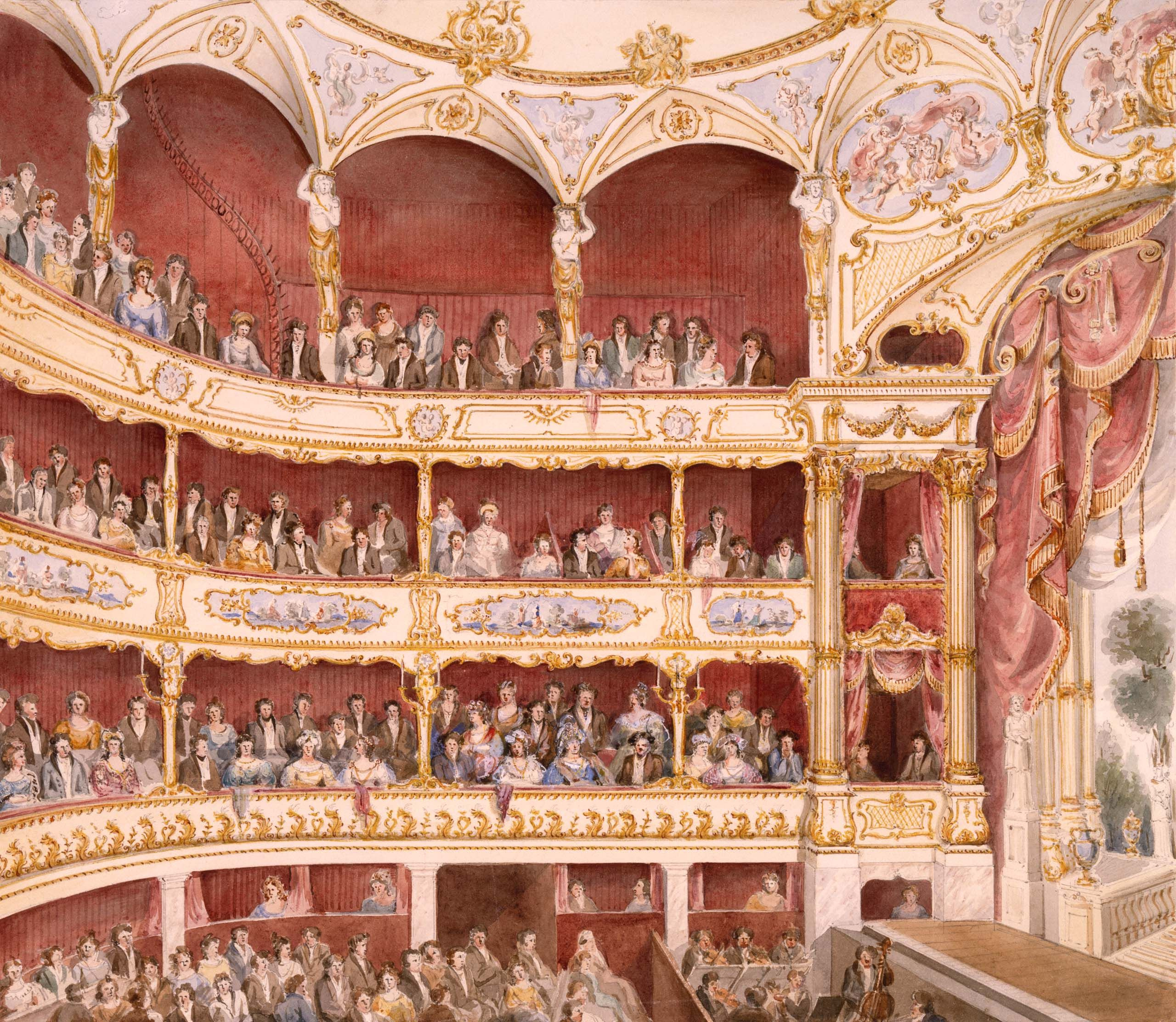
Illustration by John Gregory Crace of the interior of St. James's Theatre, decorated by the Frederick Crace Company

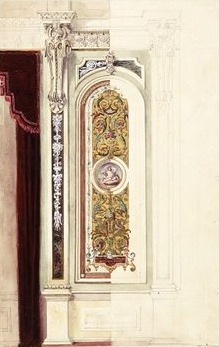
Drawing of a Crace wall decoration, sketched by Frederick Smallfield

Crace commenced work as an assistant to his father in 1825, assisting on commissions from George IV on Windsor Castle and Buckingham Palace. In 1830, at age 21, he became a full partner in the family business (thereafter known as Frederick Crace & Son), on inheriting property and capital from his mother, who had died in 1827.

He visited the Continent several times between 1825 and 1830, including an extended study tour of France and Germany in 1829, and became influenced by 18th-century French decorative arts. He witnessed fighting in the streets of Paris during the July Revolution of 1830.

Sir Charles Barry selected Augustus Pugin and Crace to decorate the interiors of the new Houses of Parliament. Maintaining his collaboration with Pugin, they worked together in the decoration of the Medieval Court in the Great Exhibition of 1851, and Crace later became the Superintendent of Decoration for the Great Exhibition building in 1862. He was also commissioned to decorate the Waterloo Chamber at Windsor Castle in 1861-2.

== Personal life ==
On 26 January 1833, he married Sarah Jane Hine Langley (1815–1894), daughter of John Inwood Langley, a civil servant at the Royal Naval Hospital, Greenwich. The couple had twelve children, of whom eleven survived infancy. His eldest son, John Dibblee Crace (1838–1919), followed him into the family business, taking on the responsibility of managing the firm when Crace's health broke down in 1854–5; the two retained a close working relationship. Another son, Everard Crace, became a silk weaver. A third son, Edward Kendall Crace, became an Australian pastoralist.

He died at his home in Half Moon Lane, Herne Hill on 13 August 1889 and was buried at the Gothic-inspired West Norwood Cemetery under a slate-faced monument.

== Bibliography ==
- Rosemary Hill. God's Architect: Pugin and the Building of Romantic Britain. Allen Lane, 2007. ISBN 978-0-7139-9499-5
