= John Dibblee Crace =

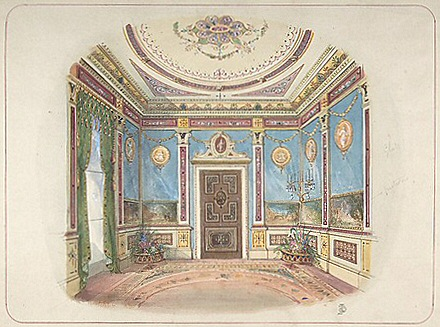
Design for a room by John Dibblee Crace. Watercolour, pen and brown ink over graphite. Metropolitan Museum of Art

John Dibblee Crace (1838 – 18 November 1919) was a distinguished British interior designer who provided decorative schemes for the British Museum, the National Gallery, the Royal Academy, Tyntesfield and Longleat among many other notable buildings.

== Life and work ==
Crace was the eldest of eleven surviving children of John Gregory Crace (1809–1889), interior decorator and author, and his wife, Sarah Jane Hine Langley (1815–1894), the daughter of John Inwood Langley (1790–1874) of Greenwich, a civil servant at the Royal Naval Hospital. His father was renowned as a decorator who was in partnership for eight years with A.W.N. Pugin, the eminent Gothic revival architect, and was head of a decorating firm founded in 1768 by his great-great-grandfather Edward Crace, a coach-decorator and keeper of the king's pictures. Edward and his son Frederick were responsible for the decoration of Brighton Pavilion and other Royal palaces.

Crace came to fame with his Victorian Gothic and Renaissance-style furniture which he exhibited at the International Exhibition in 1862.

Crace decorated the interior of Two Temple Place, William Waldorf Astor's London estate office, in the style of French Renaissance from about 1892 to 1895. For Astor, he also designed furniture and decorated the home in Cliveden. He similarly redecorated Longleat for John Thynne, 4th Marquess of Bath.

Considered the acme of 'High Victorianism', he designed decorative schemes for the main entrance of the National Gallery.

Crace decorated the Royal Academy's Fine Rooms, but a painting by William Kent lies beneath his work.

He is buried with others of the Crace dynasty at West Norwood Cemetery.

== Works in museums and galleries ==
- Metropolitan Museum of Art: Watercolour designs by John Dibblee Crace (23 works)
- Victoria and Albert Museum: Designs by John Dibblee Crace (132 works, 14 illustrated)

== Sources ==
- Megan Aldrich, 'Crace, John Dibblee (1838–1919)', Oxford Dictionary of National Biography, Oxford University Press, 2004.
