= Moncrieff, Australian Capital Territory =

Moncrieff
- Suburb
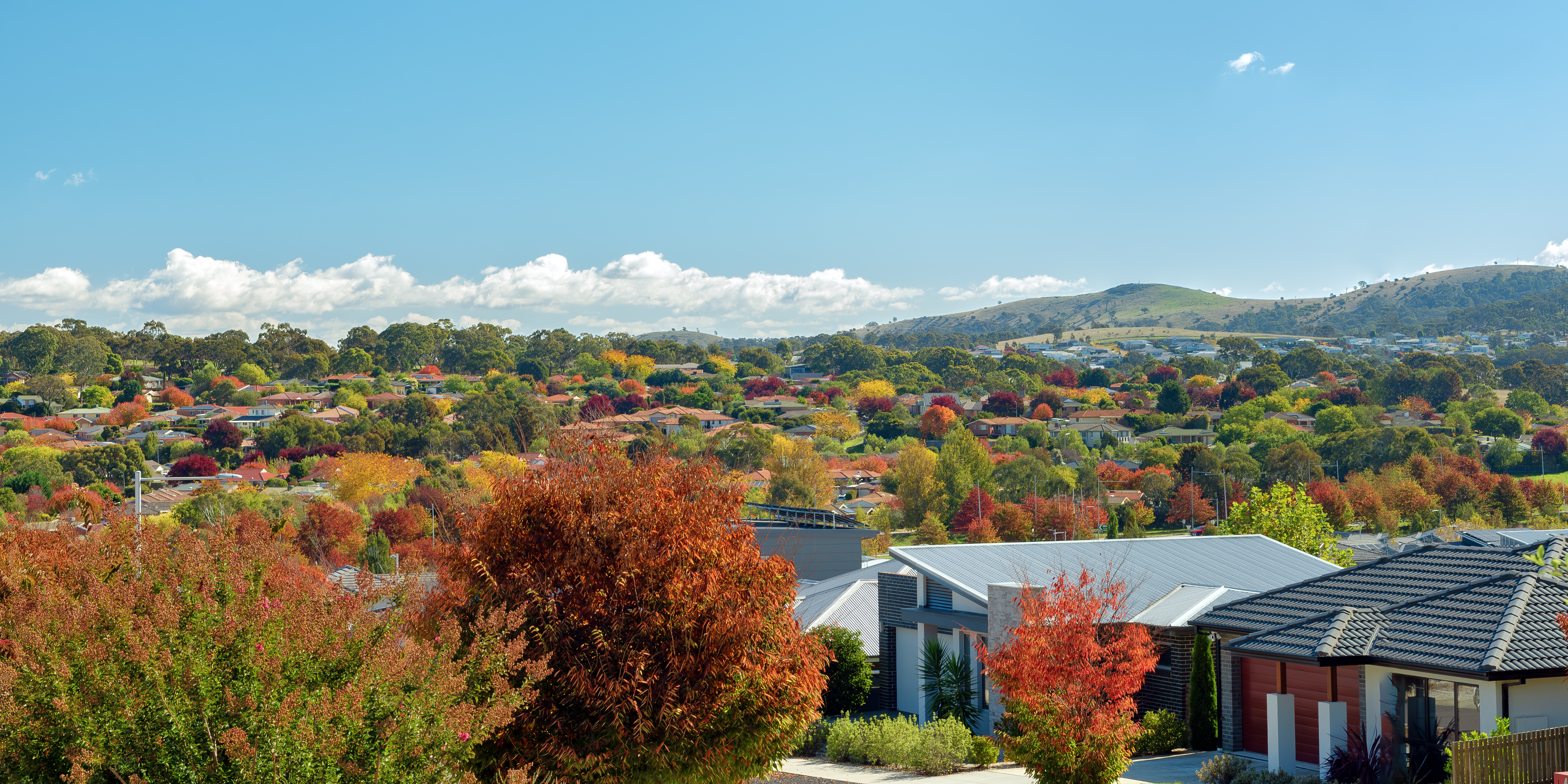

- Coordinates: 35°09′19″S 149°06′50″E
- Country: Australia
- State: Australian Capital Territory
- City: Canberra
- District: Gungahlin
- Location: 16 km (9.9 mi) N of Canberra CBD; 31 km (19 mi) NNW of Queanbeyan; 89 km (55 mi) SW of Goulburn; 286 km (178 mi) SW of Sydney
- Established: 2014

Government
  - Territory electorate: Yerrabi
  - Federal division: Fenner
- Elevation: 640 m (2,100 ft)

Population
  - Total: 5,310 (SAL 2021)
- Postcode: 2914
Suburbs around Moncrieff
Taylor	Jacka	Bonner
Taylor	Moncrieff
	Ngunnawal	Amaroo

Moncrieff is a suburb in the Gungahlin district of Canberra, the National Capital of Australia. The name was gazetted in April 1991, with initial land releases becoming available to developers in June 2014. It is named after Gladys Moncrieff, an Australian singer of the 1920-1930s musical era who was dubbed 'Australia's Queen of Song'. The suburb is in north Gungahlin, adjacent to the suburbs of Ngunnawal, Amaroo, Taylor and Jacka. The suburb is located approximately 4 km from the Gungahlin Town Centre and 16 km from the centre of Canberra, and is bounded by Mirrabei Drive and Horse Park Drive. It is home to the Moncrieff Community Recreation Park, which was voted the ACT's favourite playground in 2021.

Like most new Canberra suburbs, it is a cat containment area: all cats have to be kept inside the cat owner's property and within an enclosure if outside.

== Geography ==
The suburb has an area of approximately 200 ha, less than that of other suburbs in Gungahlin. Three hills dominate the area, the highest which is 674 metres above sea level. The green belt is characterised by grassland, yellow box–red gum woodland and lowland woodland.

=== Geology ===
The rock under Moncrieff consists of Canberra Formation of middle Silurian age. It consists of shale, slate, and mudstone.
