= Marketplace Gungahlin =

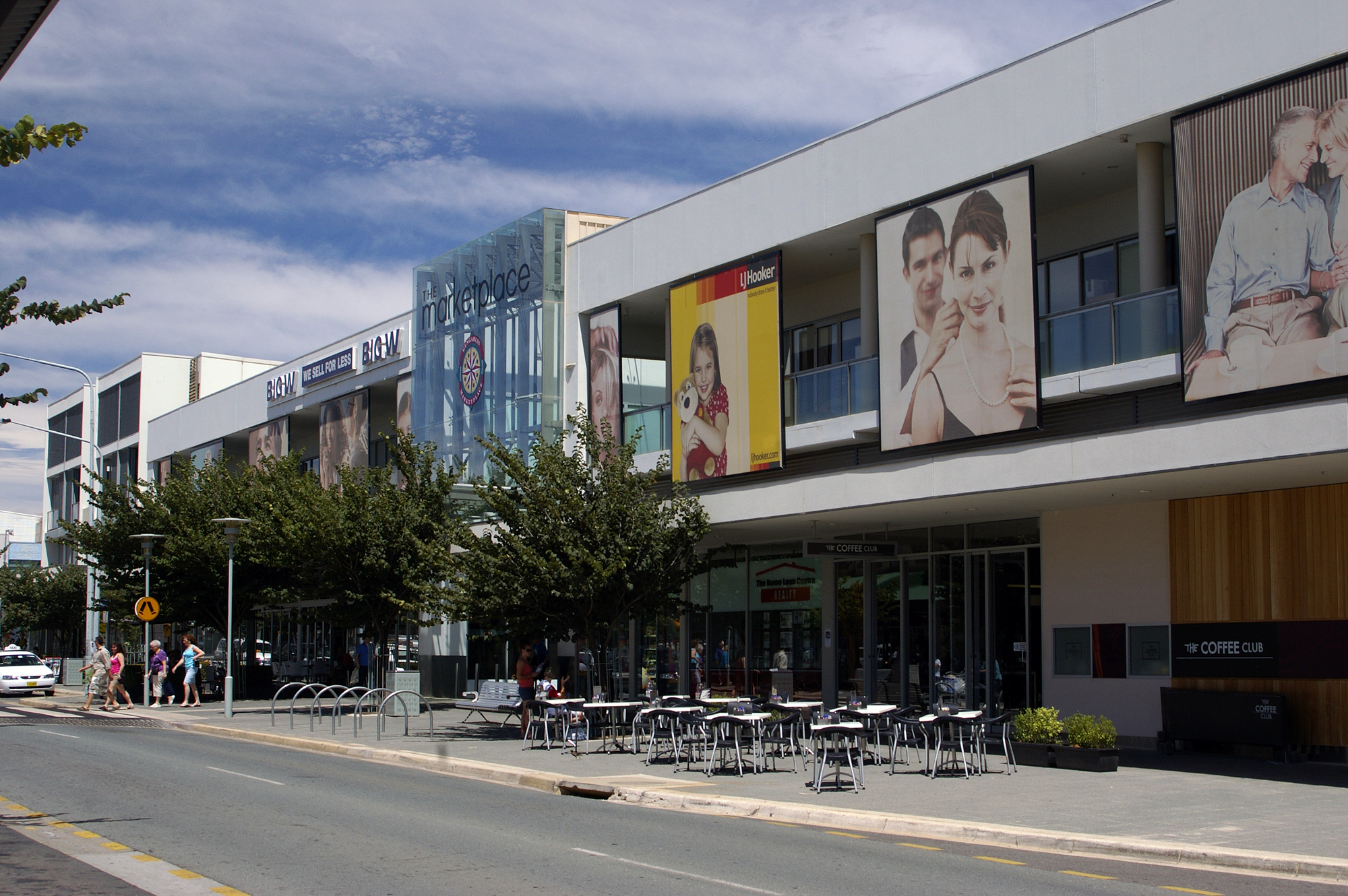
- Marketplace Gungahlin in January 2010
- Location: Gungahlin, Australian Capital Territory, Australia
- Coordinates: 35.184872°S 149.133774°E
- Address: Hibberson St
- Opened: 9 August 1998
- Owner: The Marketplace Group
- Num. of stores: 84
- Num. of anchor tenants: 3
- Floor area: 80,057 m^{2} (861,730 sq ft)
- Floors: 2
- Parking: 750+/-
- Website: marketplacegungahlin.com.au

Marketplace Gungahlin is a regional shopping centre located in the Gungahlin Town Centre of the Australian Capital Territory, Australia. The Centre is one of the leading shopping centres in the area, featuring a total of 84 stores and other facilities. Since its opening in 1998, the Centre has expanded dramatically to accommodate to the rapidly-growing Gungahlin region.

== History ==
On 9 August 1998, the then-Chief Minister, Trevor Kaine, opened unveiled and opened Gungahlin Marketplace. At this point in time, the Centre was a lone building among paddocks which would later become the Gungahlin Town Centre. It featured around 30 retailers and services, including a Woolworths as its only major retailer.

After the success of the Centre, and the growth rate of Gungahlin, the then-Chief Minister, Jon Stanhope, opened Stage Two of Marketplace Gungahlin. This development introduced an entirely new building, situated across the road from what was existing, and featured Big W, more specialty stores, and a range of car parks. It would also see a third building, housing the Gungahlin Raiders Club, be opened in a separate area.

In the spring of 2015, announcements were made that the third phase of Marketplace Gungahlin had been drafted and will commence construction for an opening date of mid-2016. These expansions would see the existing outdoor carpark be converted into a multi-storey undercover carpark, connected to what had been built under the Stage Two building, and the new space to house a new wing to the Centre which would feature Kmart as a new major retailer. It would also see the logo and facade of the Centre to undergo a refresh; as recognition of Gungahlin meaning "little rocky hill", they have incorporated this meaning into their new logo in the form of three stones. On 24 November 2016, the third phase of Marketplace Gungahlin was opened to public.

As announced in mid-2019, a fourth phase to the Centre's development had been drafted and approved. Expected additions are to include a new floor above the Stage Three areas, including a Target store as another major retailer, a new Aldi store to replace the existing one in the neighbouring Gungahlin Village shopping centre, a kids' playground, and a range of specialty stores.
