= Gungahlin =

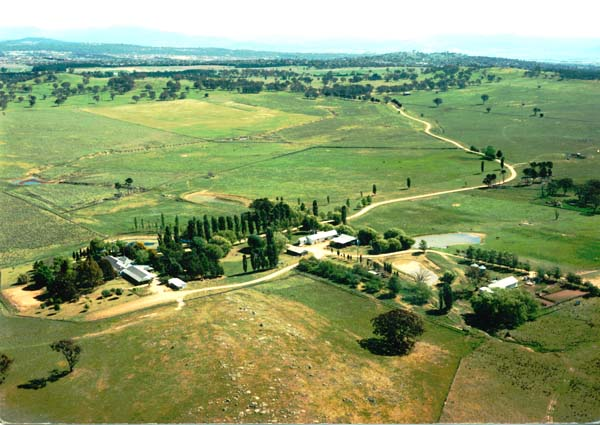
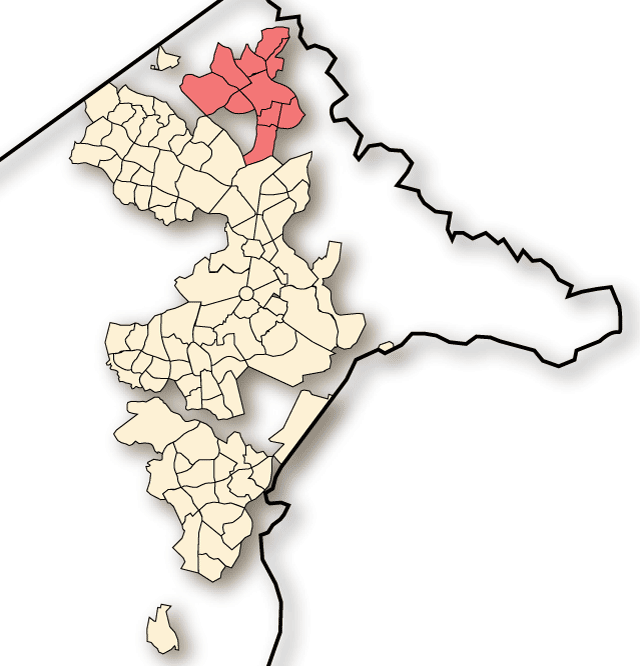
- Gold Creek was typical of the sheep properties of the Gungahlin region prior to development. Location of Gungahlin in the Australian Capital Territory

- Interactive map of Gungahlin
- Coordinates: 35.1831°S 149.133°E
- Country: Australia
- State: Australian Capital Territory
- Location: 10 km (6.2 mi) N of Canberra

Government
  - Territory electorate: Yerrabi
  - Federal division: Fenner

Area
  - Total: 90.6 km^{2} (35.0 sq mi)

Population
  - Total: 87,682 (2021 census)
  - Density: 967.8/km^{2} (2,506.6/sq mi)
- Gazetted: 12 May 1966
Localities around Gungahlin
Hall	Springrange	Sutton
Belconnen	Gungahlin	Sutton
Belconnen	North Canberra	Majura

Gungahlin (/ɡʌŋˈɡɑːlɪn/) is a district in the Australian Capital Territory and one of the fastest growing regions in Australia. The district is subdivided into suburbs, sections and blocks. Gungahlin is an Aboriginal word meaning either "white man's house" or "little rocky hill".

As of 2022 Gungahlin comprised sixteen suburbs, including several under construction and a further suburb planned. The town of Gungahlin was part of the original 1957 plan for development in the ACT and in 1991 was officially launched as the fourth 'town' by the ACT Chief Minister. At the time, the population of Gungahlin was just 389 residents. At the 2021 census, the population of the district was 87,682.

Within the district is the northern-most town centre of the ACT, situated 10 kilometres (6 mi) north of Canberra City ("Civic" in the local parlance); one of five satellite cities of the ACT, with Woden, Tuggeranong, Weston Creek and Belconnen.

== History ==
The traditional custodians of the district are the indigenous people of the Ngunnawal tribe.

Following the transfer of land from the Government of New South Wales to the Commonwealth Government in 1911, the district was established in 1966 by the Commonwealth via the gazettal of the Districts Ordinance 1966 (Cth) which, after the enactment of the Australian Capital Territory (Self-Government) Act 1988, became the Districts Act 1966. This Act was subsequently repealed by the ACT Government and the district is now administered subject to the Districts Act 2002.

During colonial times and up until the late 1960s, present-day Gungahlin was part of the former farmlands of Ginninderra. Ginninderra Village and later still the village of Hall serviced the needs of the local farming community. Free settlers included farming families such as the Rolfe, Shumack, Gillespie and Gribble families. These settlers established wheat and sheep properties such as 'Weetangara', 'Gold Creek', 'The Valley', 'Horse Park' and 'Tea Gardens'. Much of the local produce supplied the large workforce at goldfields at Braidwood and Major's Creek in New South Wales.

Construction of the industrial suburb of Mitchell commenced in 1977. Planning of Gungahlin's suburban areas commenced in 1987 and the start of construction was announced by the Chief Minister, Rosemary Follett, in October 1991.

== Location and urban structure ==
Gungahlin is the first district encountered when travelling to Canberra from Melbourne or Sydney via the Barton Highway.

The district is a set of contiguous residential and industrial suburbs that surround a town centre, together with undeveloped pastoral leases that border with the state of New South Wales to the north, north-east and east. The main industrial suburb of the district is Mitchell.

The district is separated by open country from the adjacent districts of Belconnen to the west and south-west, Canberra Central to the south, Majura to the south-east, and the town of Hall to the north-west.

== Demographics ==
At the 2021 census, there were 87,682 people in the Gungahlin district, of these 49.8 percent were male and 50.2 percent were female. Aboriginal and Torres Strait Islander people made up 1.6 percent of the population, which was lower than the national and territory averages. The median age of people in the Gungahlin district was 32 years, which was significantly lower than the national median of 38 years. Children aged 0 – 14 years made up 23.0 percent of the population and people aged 65 years and over made up 7.2 percent of the population. Of people in the area aged 15 years and over, 54.0 percent were married and 8.9 percent were either divorced or separated.

Population growth in the Gungahlin district was 35.6 percent between the 2001 census and the 2006 census, another 50.0 percent to 2011, 50.4 percent to 2016 and another 23.2 percent to 2021. Population growth in Gungahlin district was significantly higher than the national population growth for the same periods, which amounted to 5.8%, 8.3%, 8.8% and 8.6% respectively. The median weekly income for residents within the Gungahlin district in 2021 was 48.6 percent above the national average, but slightly lower than the territory average.

In 2021, compared to the national average, households in the Gungahlin district had a significantly higher than average proportion (41.3 percent) where a non-English language was used (national average was 24.8 percent); and a significantly lower proportion (58.0 per cent) where English only was spoken at home (national average was 72.0 percent).

Selected historical census data for the Gungahlin district (including Hall)
Census year		2001	2006	2011	2016	2021
Population	Estimated residents on census night	23,466	31,656	47,303	71,142	87,682
Population	District rank in terms of size within the Australian Capital Territory	5th	5th	▲4th	4th	4th
Population	Percentage of the Australian Capital Territory population	7.64%	9.82%	13.15%	19.92%	22.06%
Population	Percentage of the Australian population	0.12%	▲0.16%	▲0.22%	▲0.30%	▲0.35%
Cultural and language diversity						
Ancestry, top responses	Australian			25.6%	21.2%	27.0%
Ancestry, top responses	English			21.1%	20.4%	24.6%
Ancestry, top responses	Chinese			5.2%	6.7%	8.8%
Ancestry, top responses	Indian			n/a	n/a	8.4%
Ancestry, top responses	Irish			7.1%	7.2%	7.6%
Ancestry, top responses	Scottish			5.6%	5.7%	n/a
Language, top responses (other than English)	Mandarin	1.2%	▲1.6%	▲3.3%	▲5.3%	▲5.6%
Language, top responses (other than English)	Punjabi	n/a	n/a	n/a	n/a	▲2.7%
Language, top responses (other than English)	Hindi	n/a	n/a	▲1.5%	▲2.0%	▲2.1%
Language, top responses (other than English)	Urdu	n/a	n/a	n/a	n/a	▲2.0%
Language, top responses (other than English)	Nepali	n/a	n/a	n/a	n/a	▲1.9%
Language, top responses (other than English)	Vietnamese	2.1%	▼1.9%	▲2.0%	▼1.7%	n/a
Language, top responses (other than English)	Cantonese	1.7%	1.7%	▲1.8%	▼1.7%	n/a
Language, top responses (other than English)	Croatian	3.0%	▼2.2%	▼1.6%	n/a	n/a
Language, top responses (other than English)	Korean	n/a	n/a	n/a	▲1.5%	n/a
Religious affiliation						
Religious affiliation, top responses	No Religion	16.0%	▲19.1%	▲24.7%	▲32.1%	▲36.6%
Religious affiliation, top responses	Catholic	33.0%	▼30.8%	▼27.1%	▼21.9%	▼18.3%
Religious affiliation, top responses	Hinduism	n/a	n/a	▲4.0%	▲5.7%	▲9.0%
Religious affiliation, top responses	Anglican	17.1%	▼16.5%	▼13.8%	▼9.6%	▼7.0%
Religious affiliation, top responses	Islam	n/a	n/a	n/a	n/a	▲6.1%
Religious affiliation, top responses	Buddhism	3.5%	3.5%	▲4.2%	n/a	n/a
Median weekly incomes						
Personal income	Median weekly personal income		A$813	A$1,019	A$1,052	A$1,198
Personal income	Percentage of Australian median income		174.5%	▲176.6%	▼158.9%	▼148.8%
Family income	Median weekly family income		A$1,836	A$2,355	A$2,453	A$2,829
Family income	Percentage of Australian median income		156.8%	▲159.0%	▼141.5%	▼133.4%
Household income	Median weekly household income		A$1,676	A$2,176	A$2,247	A$2,537
Household income	Percentage of Australian median income		163.2%	▲176.3%	▼156.3%	▼145.3%

== List of suburbs ==
- Amaroo
- Bonner
- Casey
- Crace
- Forde
- Franklin
- Gungahlin
- Harrison
- Jacka
- Kenny *
- Mitchell
- Moncrieff
- Ngunnawal
- Nicholls
- Palmerston
- Taylor
- Throsby

Asterisk indicates undeveloped suburbs as of 2022.

== Transport ==
View of Hibberson Street in 2009, prior to construction of the light rail.

The primary mode of transport within the district is the private car. Despite continued discussion about the need for sustainable public transport, especially light rail, Gungahlin's development is still based on a reliance on private personal transport and an extensive road network.

=== Public transport ===
==== Bus ====
The ACTION bus service provides public transport throughout Canberra. Services from the suburbs and other town centres connect with the interchange at Gungahlin Place (35.1854°S 149.1351°E) in the town centre. Nearby is the terminus for the light rail service which runs direct to Civic.

==== Light rail ====
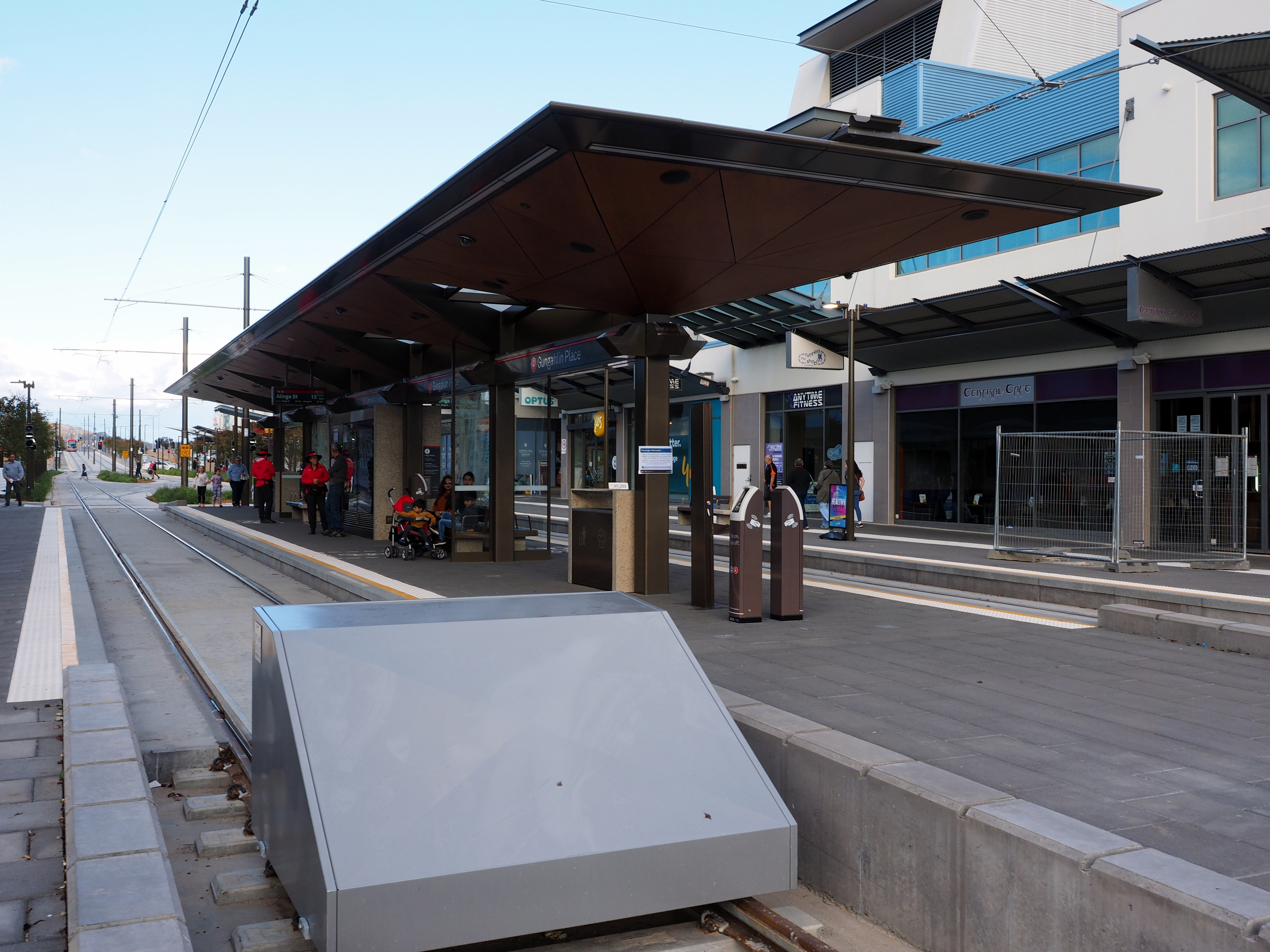
Light rail terminus, Hibberson Street

A light rail network linking the Gungahlin Town Centre to Civic opened in April 2019. It was intended to lessen peak-hour congestion on Northbourne Avenue by encouraging public transport use. The terminus is located on Hibberson Street (35.1856°S 149.1352°E) near the bus interchange.

=== Private transport ===
Private transport is the dominant mode of transport for Gungahlin residents. The major arterial roads to North Canberra and the city centre are Northbourne Avenue via the Barton Highway, Horse Park Drive and Flemington Road. Gundaroo Drive is the main connection to the district of Belconnen. With the completion of the Gungahlin Drive Extension in 2008, Gungahlin motorists can bypass the city centre to reach city's southern suburbs via Gungahlin Drive and onto William Hovell Drive and the Tuggeranong Parkway.

A number of projects have improved road access to the Gungahlin district, including:

- Duplication of the remaining single lane sections of the Gungahlin Drive Extension (completed 2011).
- Clarrie Hermes Drive extension to the Barton Highway (completed May 2012).
- Flemington Road was upgraded to a dual carriage way between Gungahlin Town Centre and Well Station Drive in 2010. As part of the light rail construction project, the remaining section from Well Station Drive to the Federal Highway was also duplicated, completed in 2019.

== Public facilities ==
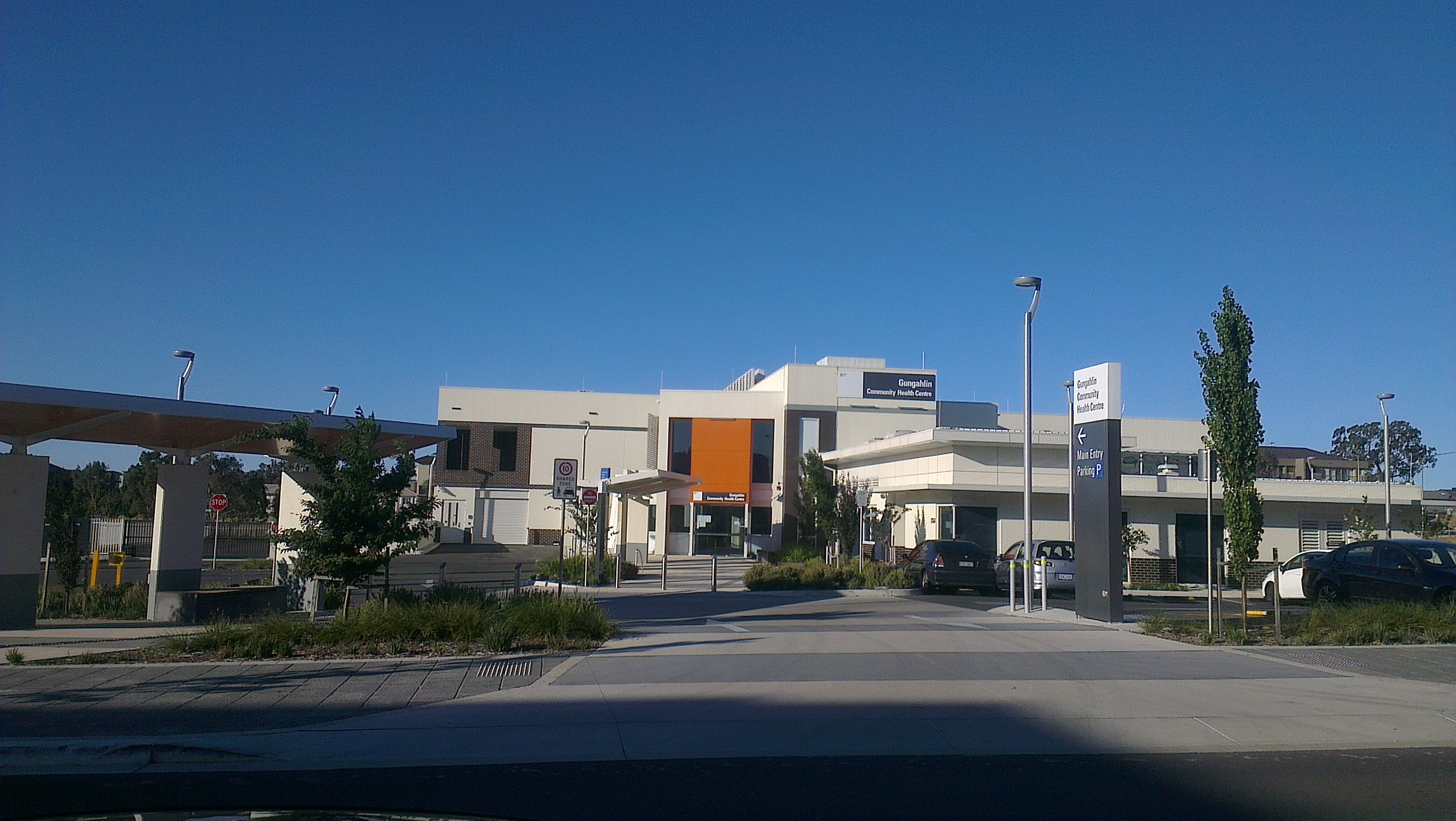
The Gungahlin Community Health Centre, opened in 2012

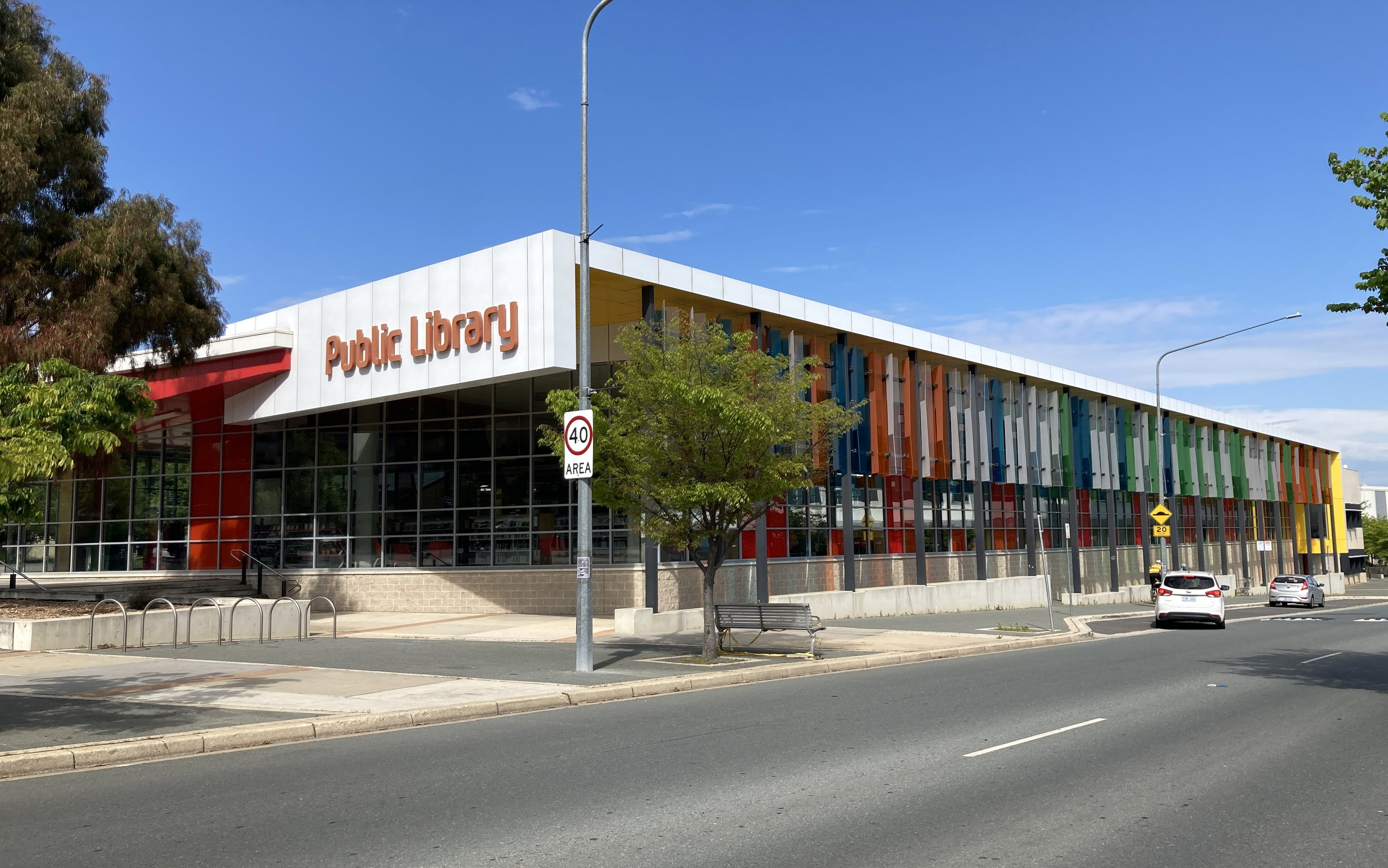
Gungahlin public library

While the Gungahlin district is serviced by North Canberra Hospital and The Canberra Hospital for emergency treatment, a number of private medical practices have established in the town centre and surrounding suburbs. The ACT Government Health Directorate also operates a Community Health Centre, providing access to allied health and outpatient services including mental health services, children's dental and nutrition, diabetes clinic, pathology collection and drug and alcohol counseling services. The clinic opened on 3 September 2012.

The Australian Capital Territory Emergency Services Agency operates the Gungahlin Joint Emergency Services Centre which provides the Gungahlin district with a local operations centre for Ambulance and Police as well as ACT Fire and Rescue and the Rural Fire Service.

== Community and sports organisations ==
The Gungahlin Community Council is the peak community representative organisation for the district.

Gungahlin local sport teams include the Gungahlin Eagles (rugby union), the Gungahlin Bulls (rugby league), Gungahlin United (association football) and the Gungahlin Jets (Australian rules football). All four clubs play matches at Gungahlin Enclosed Oval. Gungahlin is also represented in the ACT Cricket Association by the North Canberra Gungahlin Cricket Club.

== Schools ==
- John Paul College
- Gold Creek School
- Holy Spirit Primary School
- Good Shepherd Primary School
- Palmerston Primary School
- Amaroo School
- Burgmann Anglican School
- Ngunnawal Primary School
- Harrison School
- Gungahlin College
- Mother Teresa School
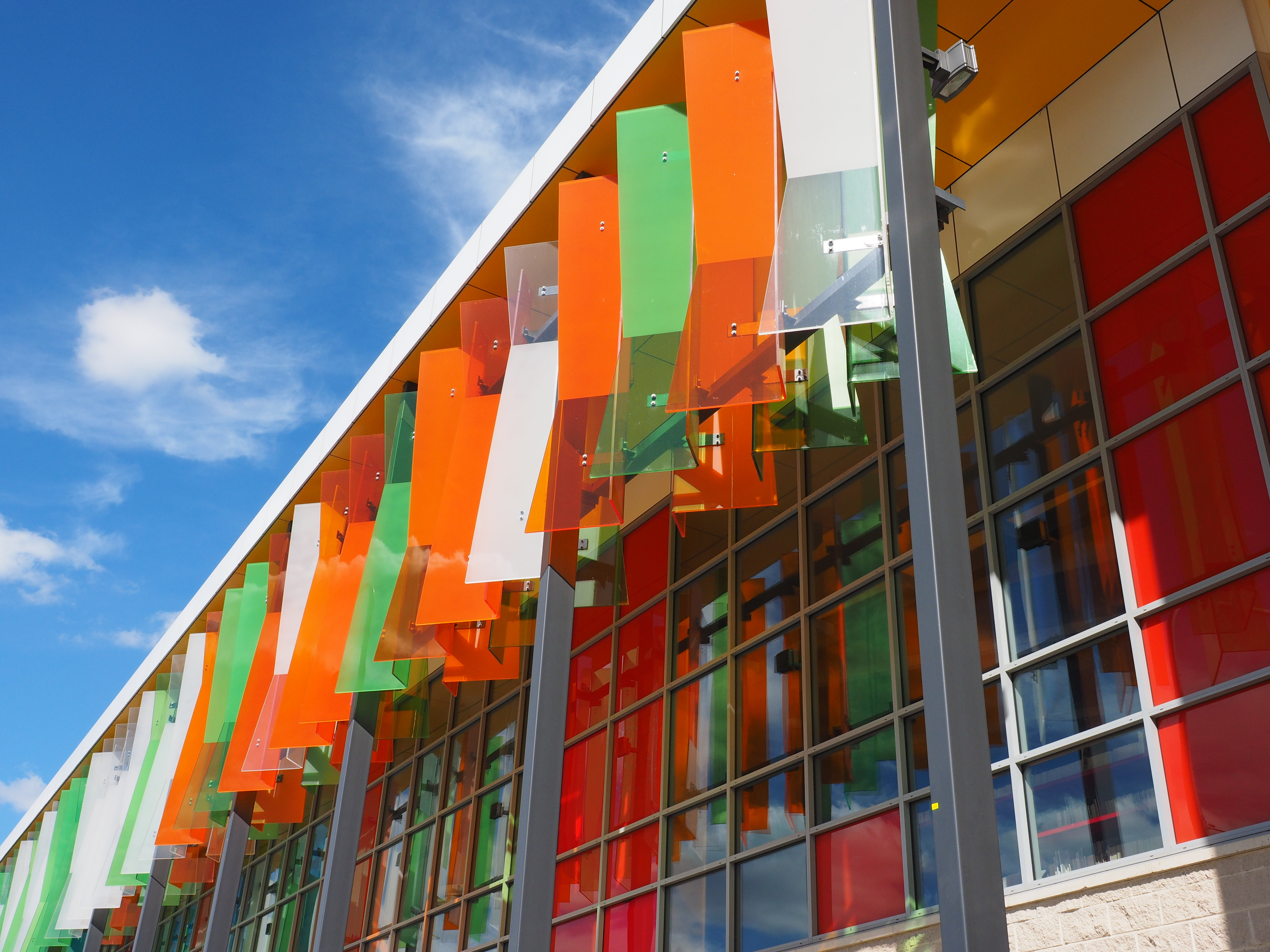
Exterior, public library

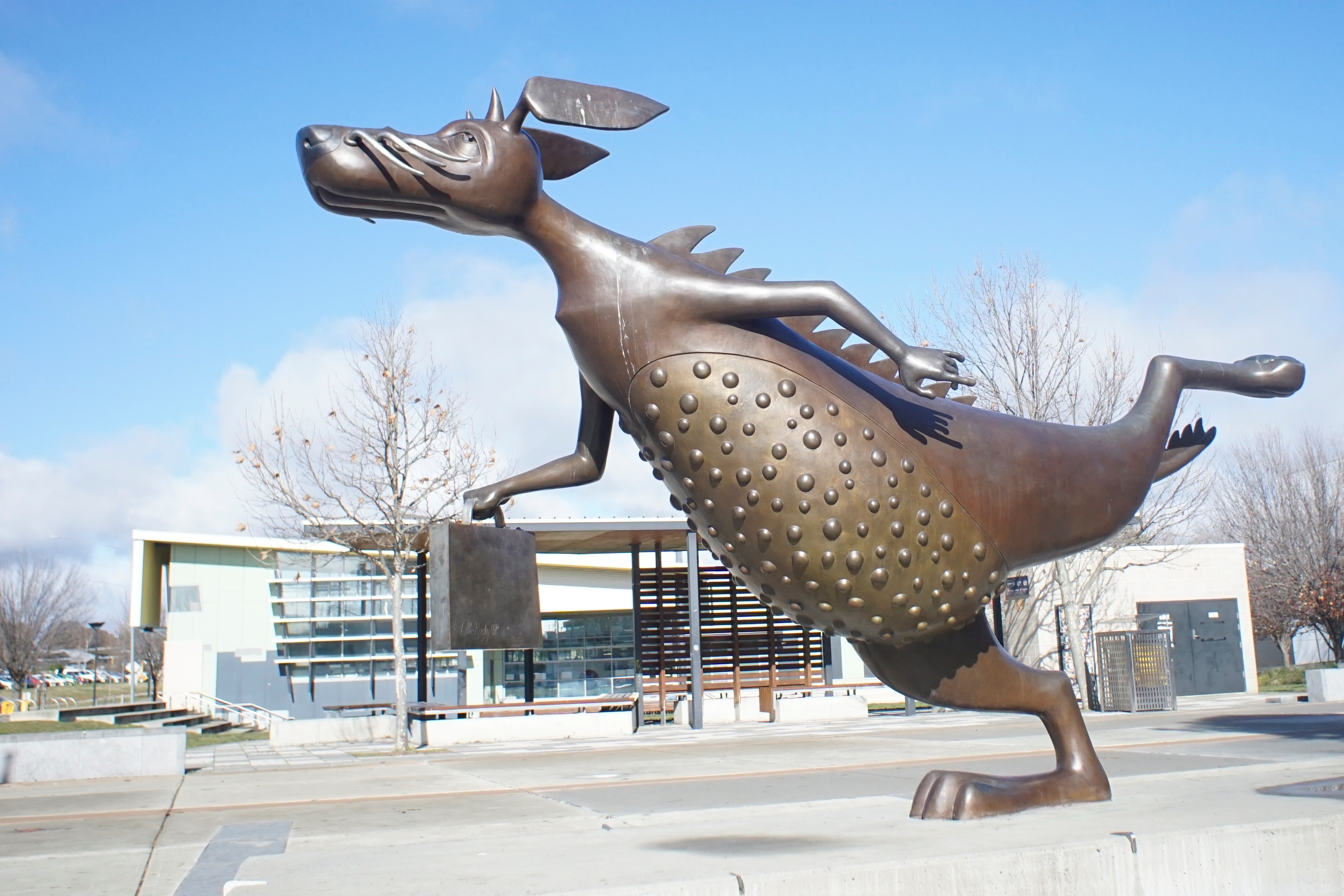
Alexander Bunyip — The Monster that Ate Canberra
