= Ngunnawal, Australian Capital Territory =

Ngunnawal
- Suburb
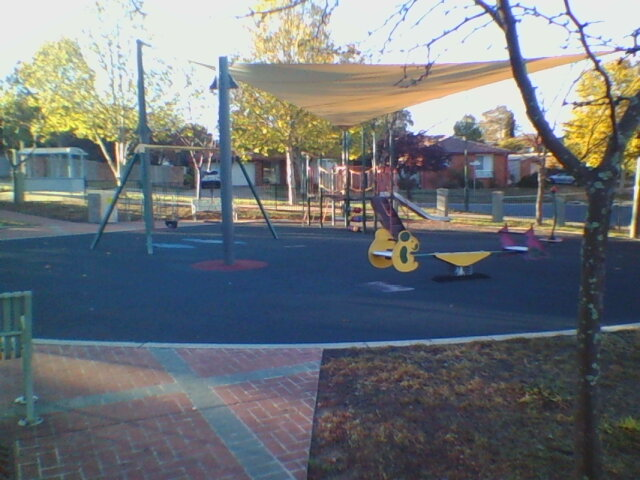
- Playground in Ngunnawal

- Interactive map of Ngunnawal
- Coordinates: 35°10′33″S 149°06′33″E
- Country: Australia
- State: Australian Capital Territory
- City: Canberra
- District: Gungahlin
- Location: 14 km (8.7 mi) NNW of Canberra; 31 km (19 mi) NNW of Queanbeyan; 86 km (53 mi) SW of Goulburn; 283 km (176 mi) SW of Sydney
- Established: 24 April 1992

Government
  - Territory electorate: Yerrabi
  - Federal division: Fenner

Area
  - Total: 4.2 km^{2} (1.6 sq mi)
- Elevation: 629 m (2,064 ft)

Population
  - Total: 10,957 (SAL 2021)
- Postcode: 2913
Suburbs around Ngunnawal
| Taylor | Moncrieff | Amaroo |
| Casey | Ngunnawal | Gungahlin |
| Nicholls | Nicholls | Palmerston |

Ngunnawal (/ŋʌnəwəl/) is a suburb in the district of Gungahlin in Canberra, Australia. The suburb is named in tribute to the Ngunnawal people, the original inhabitants of the area. The suburb was gazetted on 24 April 1992. Ngunnawal is adjacent to the suburbs of Nicholls, Casey, Moncrieff, Amaroo and Gungahlin. It is bounded by Gungahlin Drive, Horse Park Drive, Gundaroo Drive and Mirrabei Drive. Ginninderra Creek is situated near Ngunnawal's eastern boundary. The suburb is located approximately 4 km from the Gungahlin Town Centre and about 13 km from the centre of Canberra.

== Place names ==
Ngunnawal's place names relate to indigenous Australian culture. For example:

- Violet's Park on Marungul Avenue was named after Ngunnawal elder Josephine Violet Bulger in 1993. A commemorative artwork titled Meeting Place was installed in 2017 in honour of Violet's life and community contributions.
- Wanganeen Ave is named after Ken Wanganeen, a prominent Aboriginal Affairs activist.
- Jabanungga Avenue, one of the suburb's connector roads, bears the name of Robert Jabanungga, a local Aboriginal dancer and musician.
- Yerra Court is named after the Ngunnawal language word for "swim"
- Bural Court is named after the Ngunnawal language word for "day"
- Mundawari Circuit is named after the Ngunnawal language word for "bandicoot"
- Bargang Crescent is named after the Ngunnawal language word for "yellow box gum"
- Galmarra Street was named after Jackey Jackey (c. 1833–1854), Aboriginal name Galmahra (or Galmarra), the Aboriginal Australian guide and companion to explorer Edmund Kennedy

== Community facilities ==
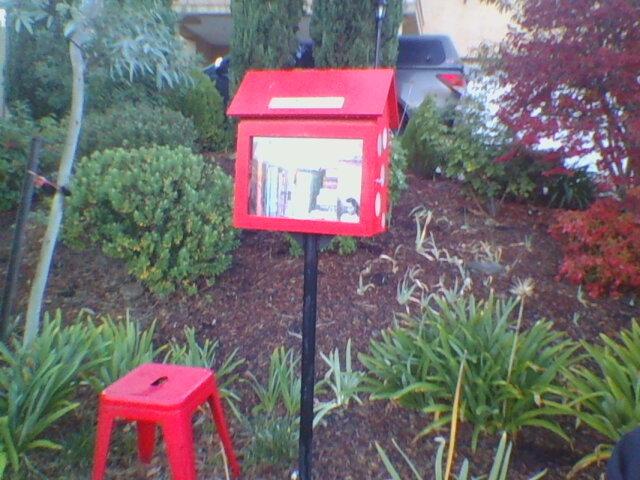
The Street Library from Arabanoo Crescent

=== Education ===
The following educational facilities are in Ngunnawal:

- Ngunnawal Preschool
- Ngunnawal Primary School (which also hosts a Koori preschool)

=== Libraries ===
The Arabanoo Street Library is located in Ngunnawal.

=== Housing ===
Ngunnawal primarily consists of residential property. A housing estate called "Broadview Estate" is located in the northwestern edge of Ngunnawal. There is a retirement village called "The Grove" in Ngunnawal.

=== Attractions ===
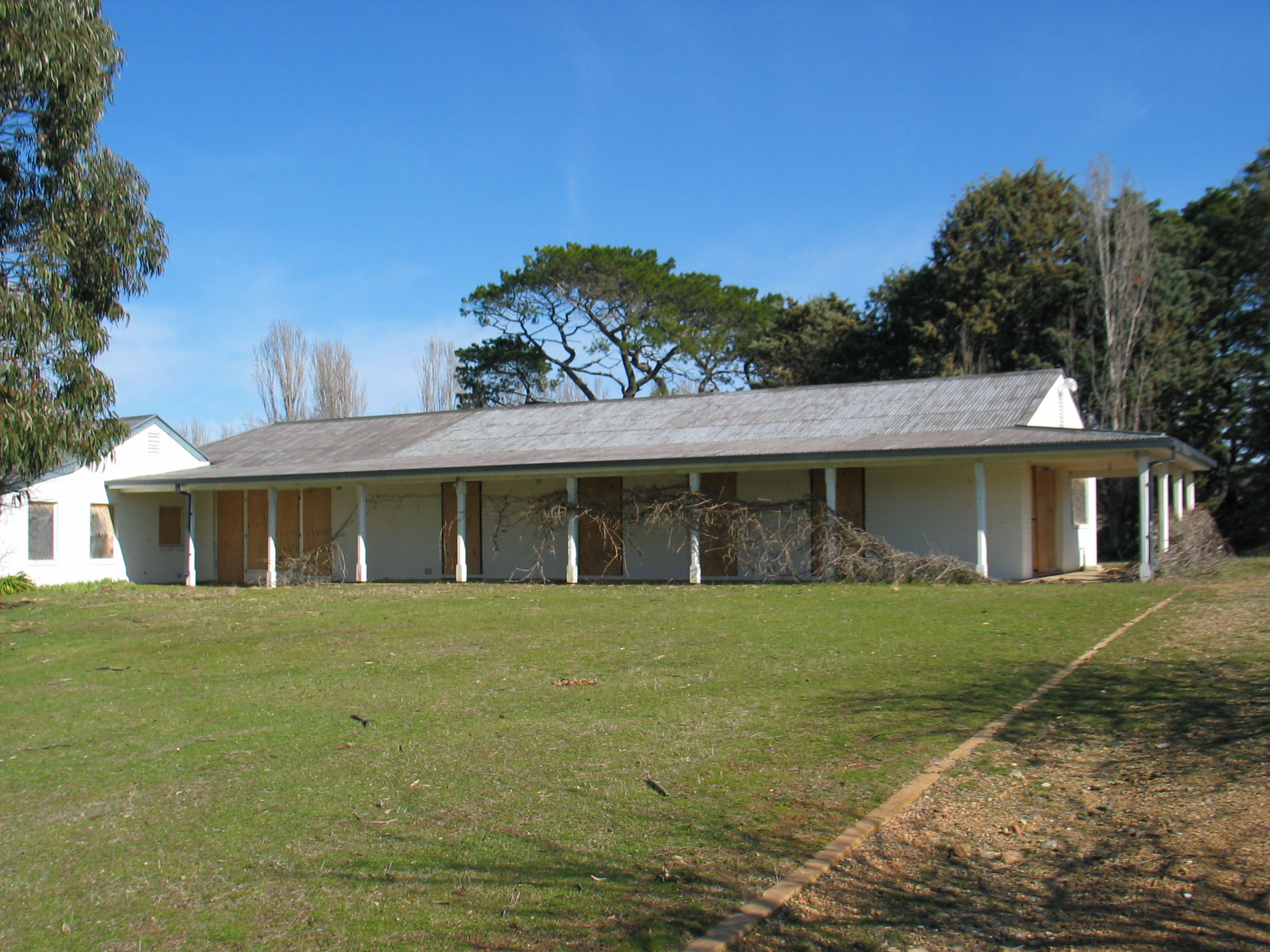
Gold Creek Homestead

The Gold Creek Homestead is located in Ngunnawal.

== Churches and schools ==
New Life Presbyterian Church is located on 107 Wanganeen Avenue.

Ngunnawal Primary School is located on Unaipon Avenue (named after David Unaipon in 1992).

== Geology ==
The Ngunnawal suburb is sited on the Canberra Formation and bedrock laided down during the late middle Silurian age. The area was studied in more detail than many other parts of Canberra by J P Ceplecha from the ANU in 1971.

Most of Ngunnawal is based on slaty shale and mudstone. In the North West corner is found dacite and quartz andesite. A layer of tuff is formed into a V-shaped surface exposure in the western half of the suburb. A smaller N-shaped outcrop of tuff is found in the east corner. A crook-shaped outcrop of ashstone is exposed just to the east of the Vee.

The structure of the rock has been determined by folding. The folds are aligned north-north east and plunge to the south south west. An anticline determines the point of the Vee pointing south south west. Another anticline determines the end of the crook shape. A syncline determines the top of the crook. The Deakin Fault runs roughly parallel to the fold axes on the south east side along Ginninderra Creek.

View of Ngunnawal and Gungahlin beyond Note Mount Majura, Mount Ainslie and Black Mountain from left to right
