= Forde, Australian Capital Territory =

Forde
- Suburb
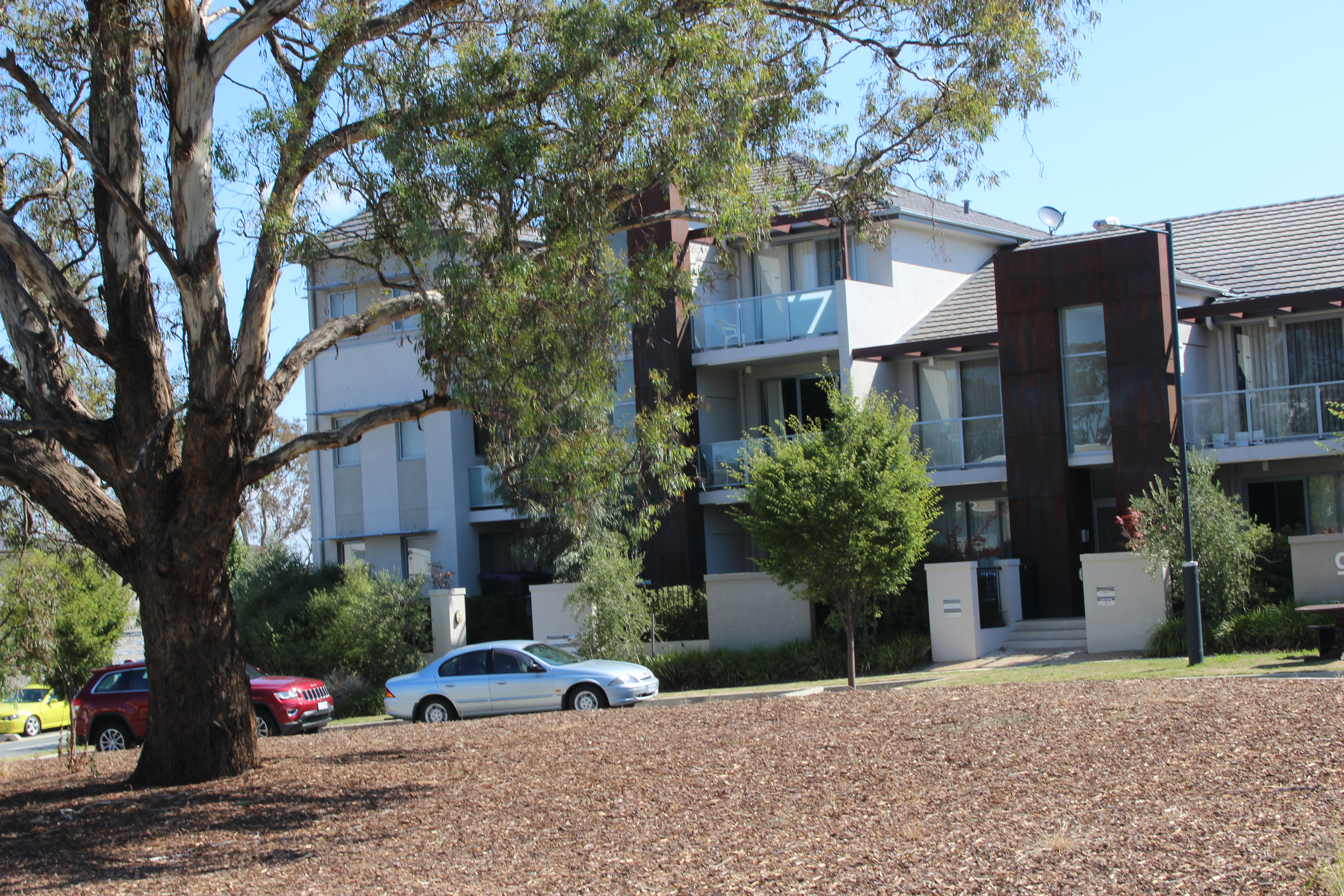
- Flats in Forde

- Coordinates: 35°9′59″S 149°08′35″E
- Country: Australia
- State: Australian Capital Territory
- City: Canberra
- District: Gungahlin
- Location: 15 km (9.3 mi) N of Canberra CBD; 28 km (17 mi) NNW of Queanbeyan; 86 km (53 mi) SW of Goulburn; 283 km (176 mi) SW of Sydney

Government
  - Territory electorate: Yerrabi
  - Federal division: Fenner

Area
  - Total: 1.9 km^{2} (0.73 sq mi)
- Elevation: 630 m (2,070 ft)

Population
  - Total: 4,435 (SAL 2021)
- Postcode: 2914
Suburbs around Forde
Bonner	Bonner
Amaroo	Forde
	Gungahlin	Throsby

Forde is an affluent northern suburb of the Canberra, Australia district of Gungahlin. It is named in honour of Frank Forde, who served as Prime Minister of Australia for a week in 1945 following the death of John Curtin. The suburb abuts the Mulligans Flat Woodland Sanctuary and is adjacent to the suburbs of Amaroo, Throsby and Bonner. The suburb is bound to the south and west respectively by Horse Park Drive and Gundaroo Road. Settlement of the suburb began in 2008 and it had an estimated population of 4,308 at the 2016 census.

== History ==
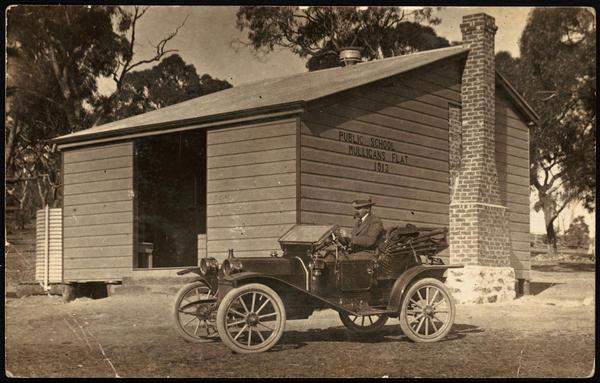
Mulligans Flat Public School c. 1913

Europeans first settled Canberra and surrounding region during the 1830s which was known as Ginninderra. A road between Murrumbateman and Bungendore passed through nearby Mulligans Flat. A row of mature trees mark the alignment of the coach route to Bungendore. The remains of the historic site of the Mulligans Flat schools as well as hut sites, old fences, drays, sheep shearing sheds and farm machinery area are also scattered across the area. Three farms namely Stray Leaf, East View and Mulligans Flat predate the founding of the suburb.

== Recreation ==
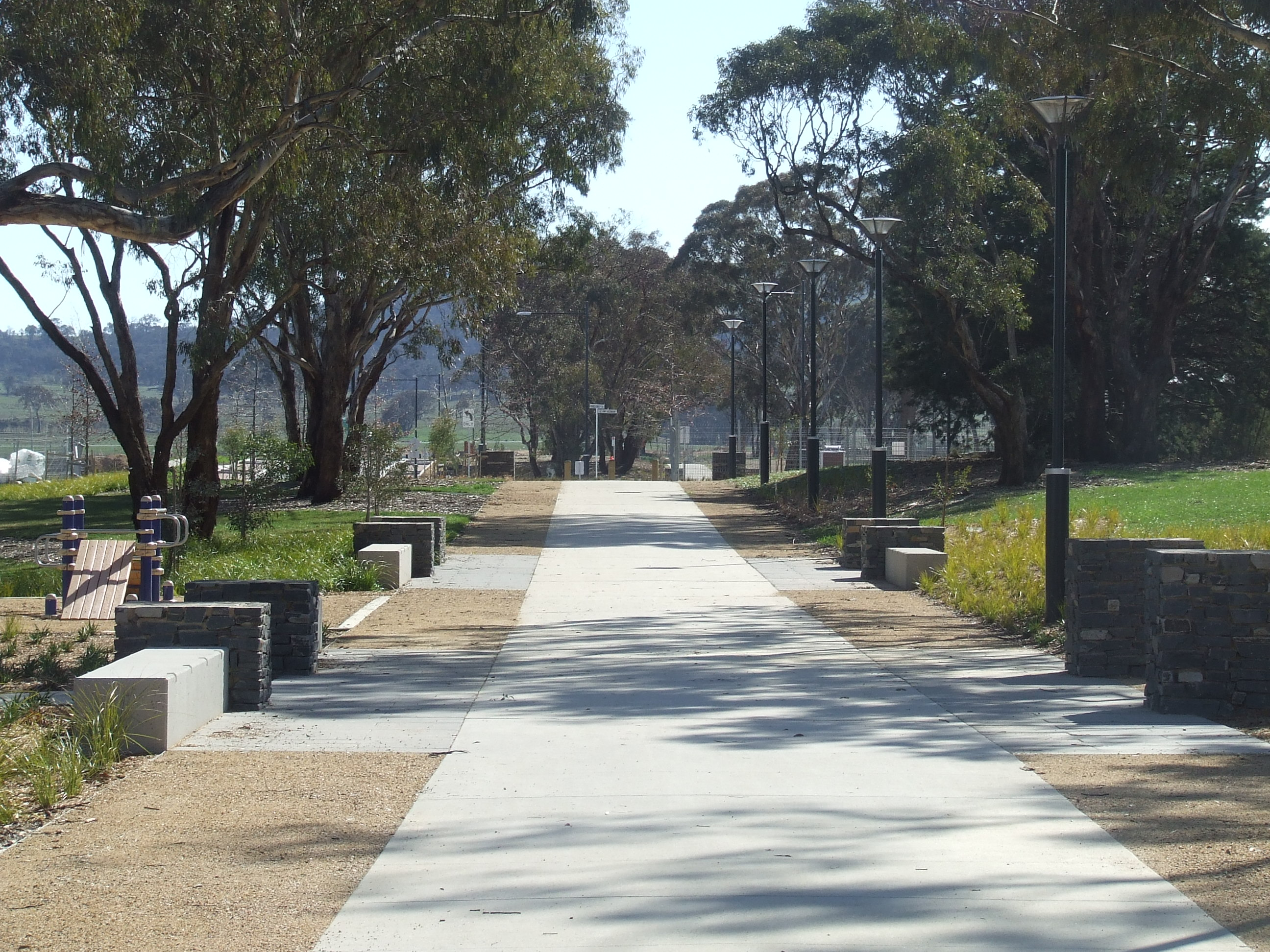
Heritage pathway through Forde

Twenty-nine percent of the suburb is devoted to green space. The suburb includes 11 main parks and 39 hectares of wetlands and nature reserves with trails designed for eco-activity. As a consequence every home situated within 200 metres of a landscaped park, wetland or nature reserve.

Mulligans Flat Nature Reserve compasses natural habitat, rich Indigenous history and reflects a colourful European heritage. The reserves is also one of the best bird-watching sites in the ACT, and home to the rare regent honeyeater and Forde's own superb fairy wren. The nature reserves at Mulligans Flat and nearby Goorooyarroo, include four native bird species and populations of rare shingleback lizard, echidna, frog and reptile species. In 2005, the ACT Government passed the Domestic Animals (Cat Containment) Amendment Act into law which requires residents in Forde and nearby Bonner to keep any cats indoors or in an outdoor enclosure 24 hours per day.

== Geology ==
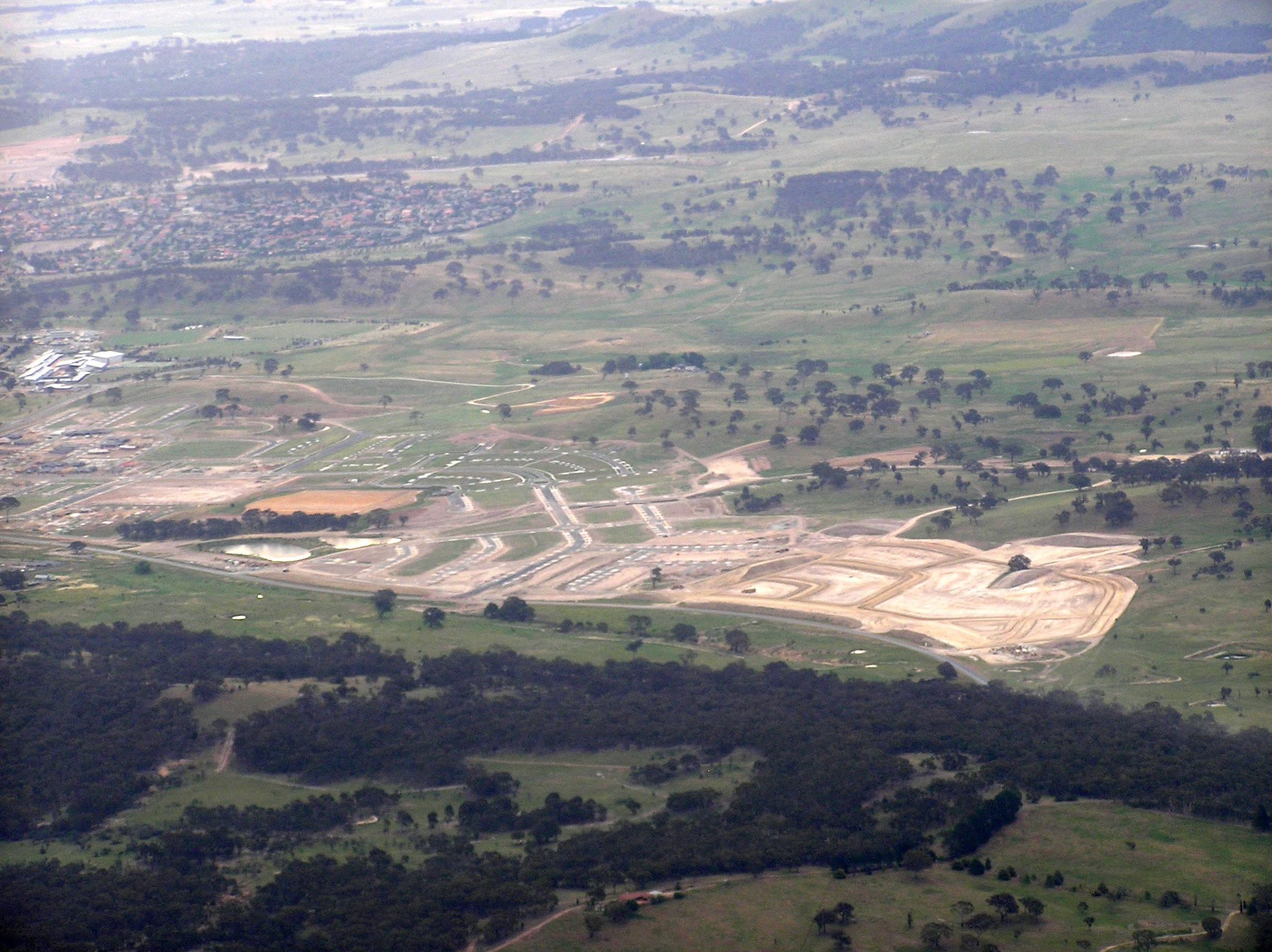
Aerial view from the east with Forde in the foreground late 2009

The headwaters of Ginninderra Creek rise in the northern end of the suburb. The low point is 614 metres, and the highest point is 654 metres on Gundaroo Road at the northernmost point of Forde. The rock under Forde consists of Canberra Formation of middle Silurian age. It consists of shale, slate, and mudstone. A fault follows Ginninderra Creek, marked with quartz. Folds have distorted the rock with structure in the north east direction, parallel to the fault.
