= Taylor, Australian Capital Territory =

Taylor
- Suburb
- Coordinates: 35.149°S 149.102°E
- Country: Australia
- State: Australian Capital Territory
- City: Canberra
- District: Gungahlin
- Location: 17 km (11 mi) N of Canberra CBD; 32 km (20 mi) NNW of Queanbeyan; 90 km (56 mi) SW of Goulburn; 287 km (178 mi) SW of Sydney
- Established: 1991

Government
  - Territory electorate: Yerrabi
  - Federal division: Fenner
- Elevation: 667 m (2,188 ft)

Population
  - Total: 2,220 (SAL 2021)
- Postcode: 2913
Suburbs around Taylor
	Taylor	Jacka
Casey	Ngunnawal	Moncrieff

Taylor is a suburb in Gungahlin, Canberra, Australia. Development of the suburb began in 2017. It is named after magazine publisher Florence Mary Taylor, who was editor of and writer for several Australian building industry journals including the influential Building magazine. The suburb is approximately 4 km from the Gungahlin Town Centre and 16 km from the centre of Canberra and bounded to the south by Horse Park Drive. One Tree Hill lies to the northwest on the border with New South Wales. The suburb is located in north Gungahlin adjacent to the suburbs of Moncrieff, Casey, Jacka and Ngunnawal.

== History ==
Until 1991, the suburb Taylor was part of the former 'Gold Creek' a 1,594–hectare rural property with the Gold Creek Homestead at its centre.

== Local facilities ==
A public primary school, Margaret Hendry School, opened in 2019 opposite the Lachlan Kennedy Memorial Park and has capacity for 600 students. It caters to preschool through to year 6 students from the North Gungahlin suburbs of Taylor, Jacka, Moncrieff and Casey (a shared priority enrolment area for Gold Creek School).

Taylor District Playing Fields has 2 rectangle playing fields and is located directly adjacent to Margaret Hendry School.

== Geology ==
The rocks in Taylor are from the late middle Silurian period. Hawkins volcanics green grey dacite and quartz andesite are in the west. The Canberra Formation is separated by a fault in the east side. It consists of slatey shale and mudstone, with north east trending bands of acid volcanics (dacite and andesite).

== See also ==
- Canberra District wine region
