= Amaroo, Australian Capital Territory =

Amaroo
- Suburb
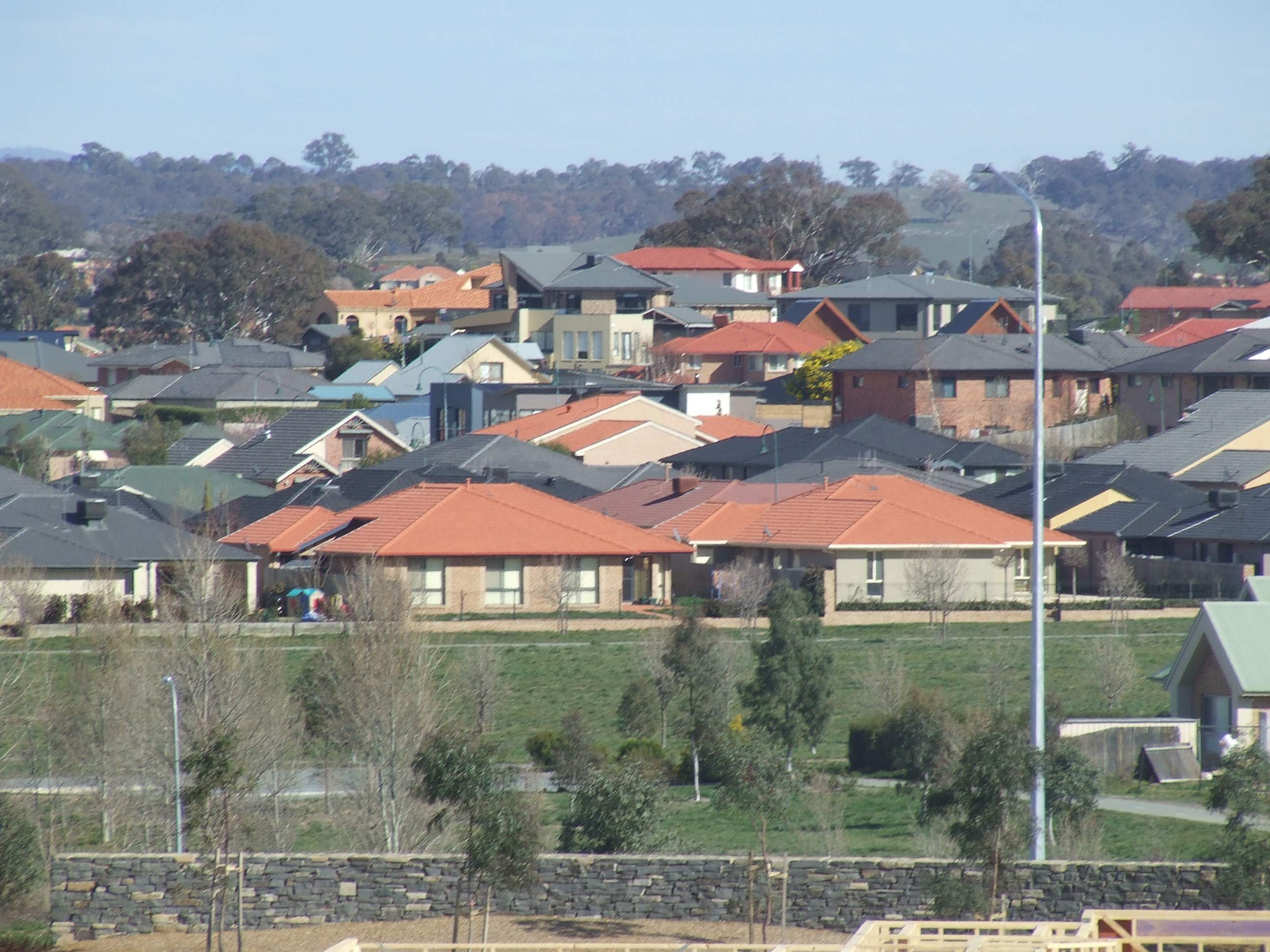

- Coordinates: 35°10′17″S 149°7′44″E
- Country: Australia
- State: Australian Capital Territory
- City: Canberra
- District: Gungahlin
- Location: 15 km (9.3 mi) N of Canberra CBD; 31 km (19 mi) NNW of Queanbeyan; 87 km (54 mi) SW of Goulburn; 284 km (176 mi) SW of Sydney
- Established: 1994

Government
  - Territory electorate: Yerrabi
  - Federal division: Fenner

Area
  - Total: 2.6 km^{2} (1.0 sq mi)
- Elevation: 638 m (2,093 ft)

Population
  - Total: 6,129 (SAL 2021)
- Postcode: 2914
Suburbs around Amaroo
Jacka	Bonner	Forde
Moncrieff	Amaroo	Gungahlin
Ngunnawal	Ngunnawal	Gungahlin

Amaroo (/ˈæməruː/) is a suburb in the Canberra, Australia district of Gungahlin and was gazetted on 18 October 1991. Amaroo means 'a beautiful place' in Nyoongar. Place names in Amaroo such as Shoalhaven Avenue are named after Australian rivers and lakes. Amaroo is adjacent to the suburbs of Ngunnawal, Gungahlin, Moncrieff, Forde, Bonner and Jacka. The suburb is bounded by Mirrabei Drive and Horse Park Drive and Gundaroo Drive. The suburb is located approximately 1.4 km from the Gungahlin Town Centre and 15 km from the centre of Canberra.

== History ==
Although the suburb of Amaroo is newly established, the history of the land upon which the suburb is situated stretches back at least one hundred and fifty years. Amongst the historic remnants from Amaroo's colonial past is Crinigan's stone cottage located in Wanderer Court Amaroo.

John and Maria (née Mansfield) Crinigan lived in a stone cottage at this site from about 1842 until 1863. John was a native of Westmeath, Ireland and at 19 years of age was sentenced to transportation for life for "assaulting habitation". He arrived in the colony of New South Wales in 1836 and was assigned to work for George Thomas Palmer on his property Palmerville (the remains of the homestead are now under the Heritage Park in Belconnen).

They settled here in the stone cottage and in 1849 John was pardoned. The site of this cottage was well selected as it is near a pool of water on Ginninderra Creek.

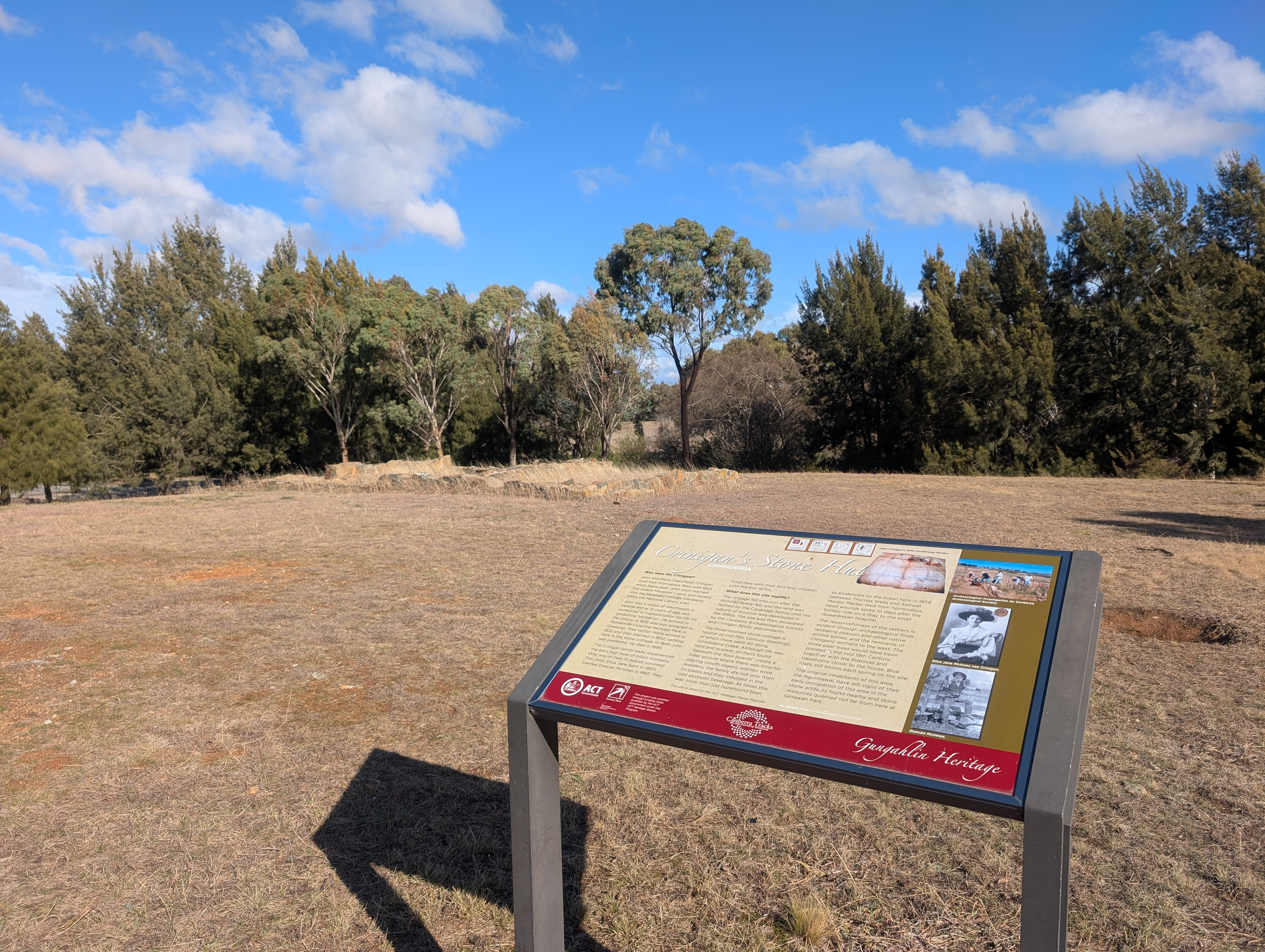
Site of Crinigan's Stone Cottage

== Demographics ==
In the 2021 Census, there were 6,129 people in Amaroo. 71.5% of people were born in Australia. The next most common countries of birth were India 4.0%, England 2.3% and China 1.8%. 73.0% of people spoke only English at home. Other languages spoken at home included Mandarin at 2.4%. The most common responses for religion were No Religion 38.5%, Catholic 23.3% and Anglican 10.2%.

== Community facilities ==
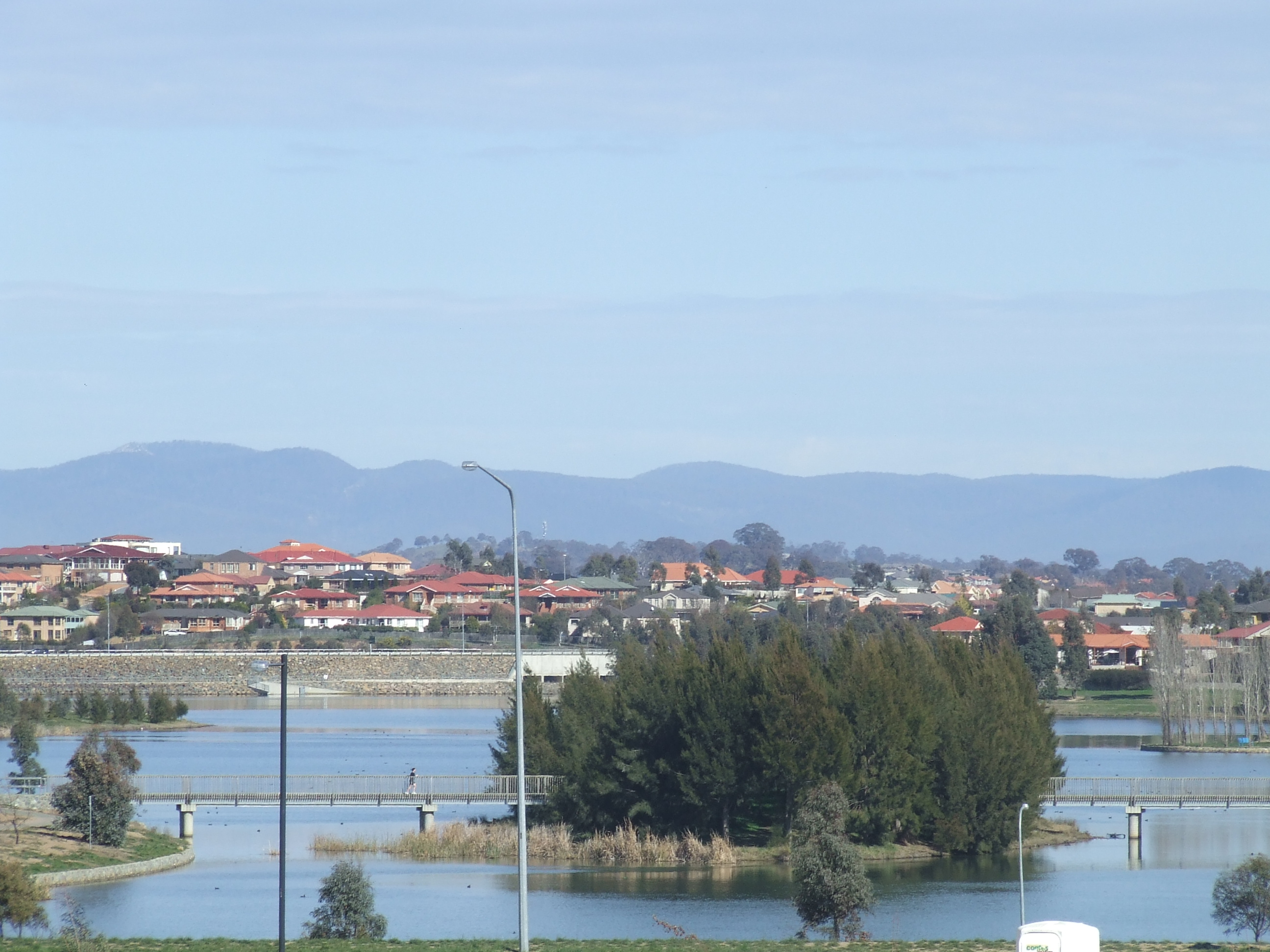
Yerrabi Pond looking west

The suburb has two schools next to each other, Good Shepherd Catholic Primary School Amaroo School (picture) complex accommodates children from Preschool to Year 10 and is the first purpose-built government Middle School in the ACT. It was completed in three stages.

== Churches and schools ==
There are two churches located in the suburb of Amaroo. Holy Spirit Catholic Church is located at 93 Burdekin Avenue. It is the second largest Catholic Parish in the whole Canberra-Goulburn Diocese. Northpointe Baptist Church is located inside Amaroo School.

Amaroo School has various buildings include the Preschool, the Primary School classroom block, and the two-storey Middle and High School classroom block, together with shared Administration, Library, Hall/Canteen, Gymnasium, outdoor tennis, netball and basketball courts, numerous ovals and play areas. A combined Technology, Arts and Science block is located within the Middle and High School.

Amaroo was the first suburb in the ACT to receive the 100 Mbs NBN internet and amongst the first places in Australia (outside of the pilot program). The roll-out of the NBN in Amaroo commenced in 2011 and was completed in 2013.

== Shopping ==
Construction commenced on an Amaroo shopping precinct in 2012. This borders on Horsepark Drive and is nearby Amaroo School. Currently there is a petrol station and shop located adjacent to this new shopping precinct. The shopping centre is now fully functional with a Coles supermarket, Wok it Up and Aldi, among others. Large shopping centres nearby include the Gungahlin Marketplace and Gungahlin Village.

== Geology ==
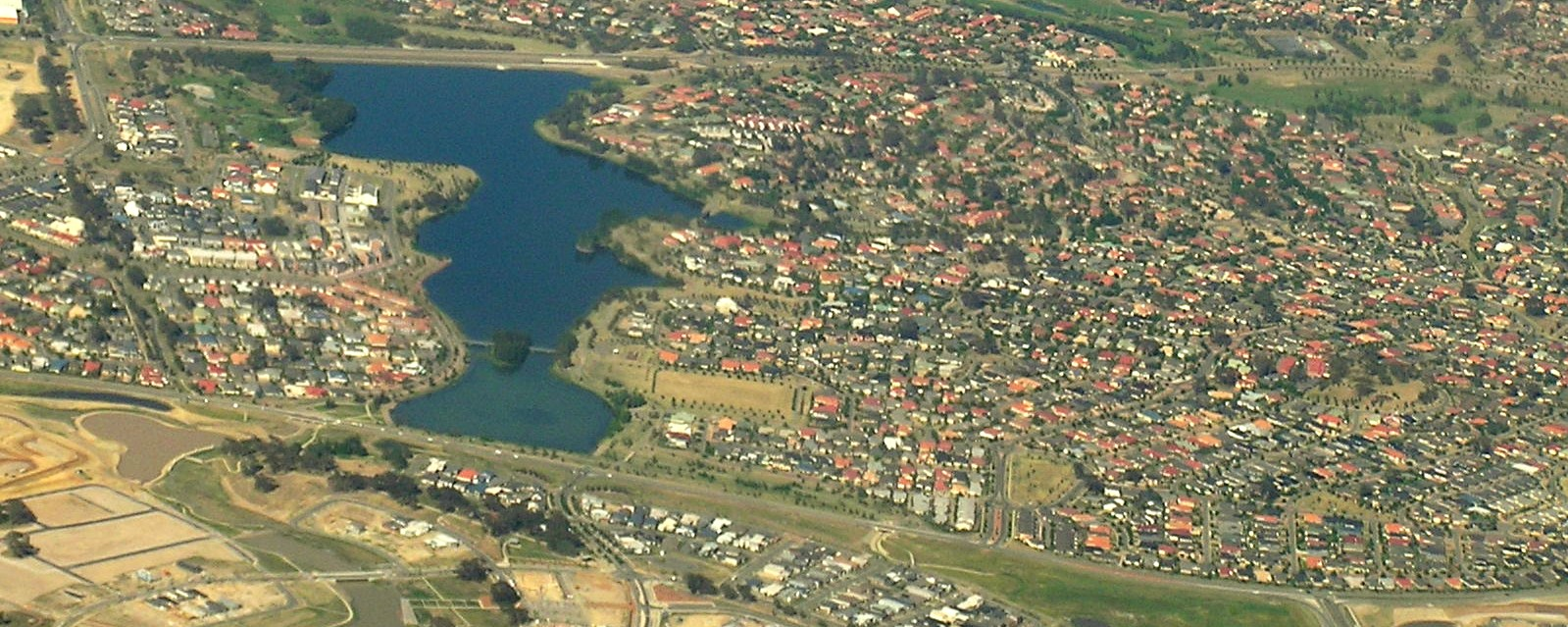
Aerial view from north

Amaroo is underlaid by the Canberra Formation from the late middle Silurian age. The area was studied in more detail than many other parts of Canberra by J P Ceplecha from the ANU in 1971. Most of Amaroo is based on slaty shale and mudstone. A 125m wide band oriented north north east of dacite and quartz andesite is in the centre. A patch of tuff is under the south west corner.

The structure of the rock has been determined by folding. The folds are aligned north-north east and plunge to the south south west. There are two short faults in the mid south that are marked on the surface by quartz. A long fault runs parallel with the folding axis along the south east side along Ginninderra Creek determining its orientation.
