= Jacka, Australian Capital Territory =

Jacka
- Suburb
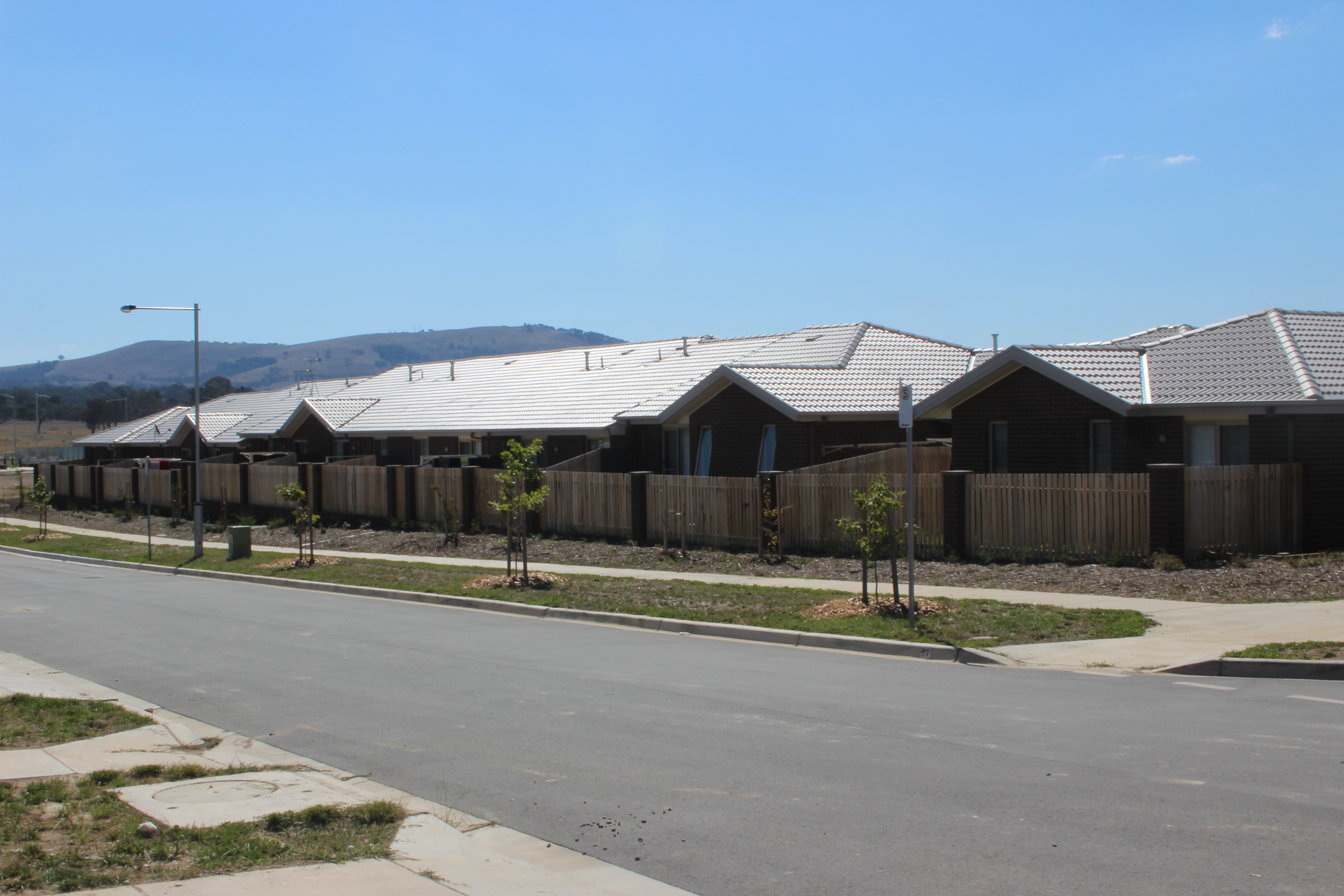
- Some of the first houses in Jacka

- Coordinates: 35°09′07″S 149°07′41″E
- Country: Australia
- State: Australian Capital Territory
- City: Canberra
- District: Gungahlin
- Location: 17 km (11 mi) N of Canberra CBD; 31 km (19 mi) NNW of Queanbeyan; 88 km (55 mi) SW of Goulburn; 285 km (177 mi) SW of Sydney
- Established: 2001

Government
  - Territory electorate: Yerrabi
  - Federal division: Fenner
- Elevation: 646 m (2,119 ft)

Population
  - Total: 712 (SAL 2021)
- Postcode: 2914
Suburbs around Jacka
Taylor	Jacka	Bonner
Moncrieff	Amaroo	Bonner

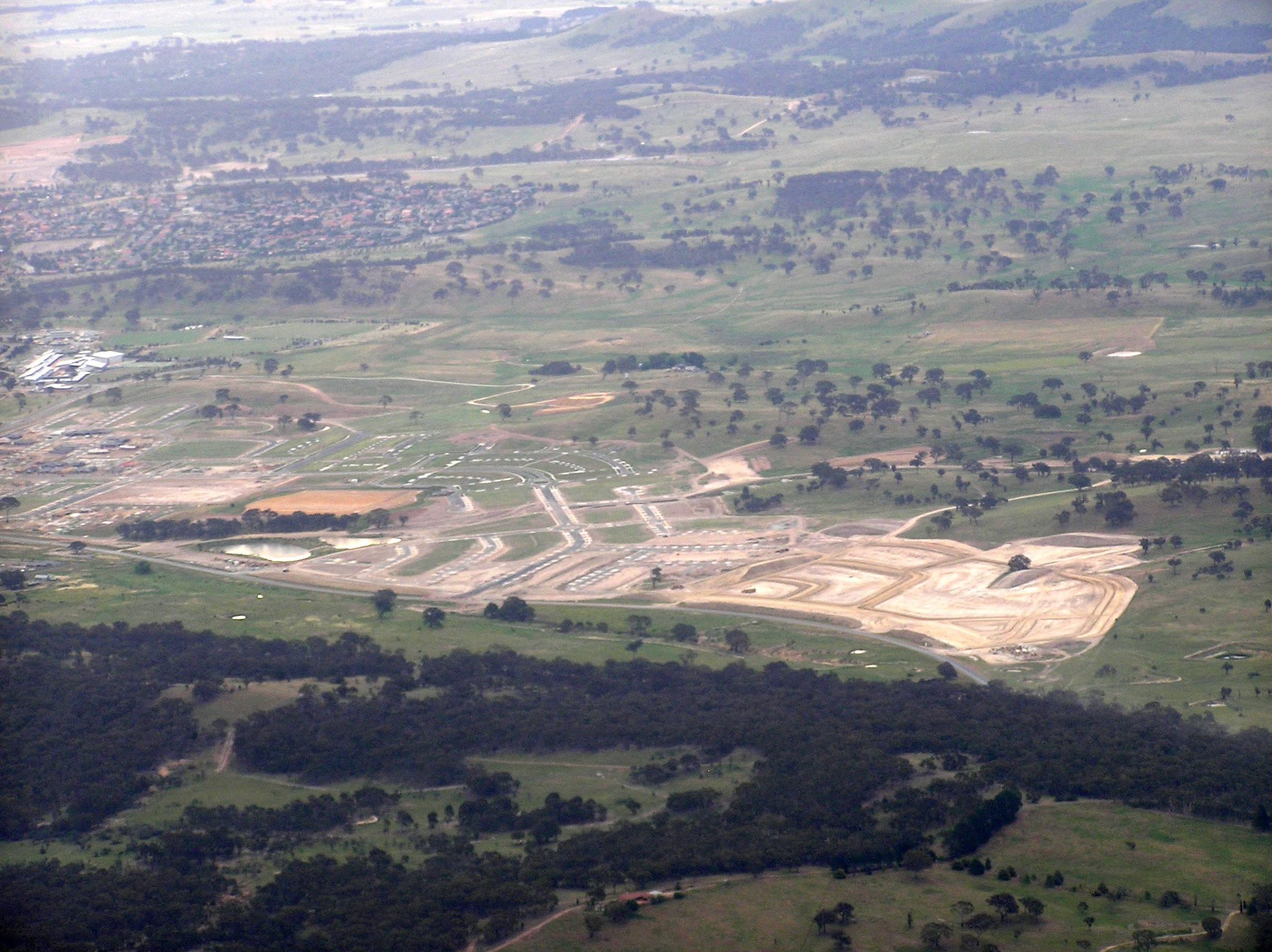
Jacka is towards the back as a green patch in this aerial photo from the east

Jacka is a suburb of Gungahlin, Canberra, the National Capital of Australia. The suburb was gazetted on 25 April 2001 and development began in 2013. It had some residents at the beginning of 2014. The suburb is named after Albert Jacka, the first Australian to be decorated with the Victoria Cross during the First World War, receiving the medal for his actions during the Gallipoli Campaign. Jacka is located in north Gungahlin adjacent to the suburbs of Amaroo, Taylor, Bonner and Moncrieff. The suburb is located approximately 4 km from the Gungahlin Town Centre and 16 km from the centre of Canberra.

== Development ==
The suburb when finished is expected to accommodate approximately 1500 blocks and contain a variety in housing types including:

- Standard residential;
- Medium and higher density residential;
- Compact block housing in the locations identified in the Compact Block Housing for New Estates; and
- "Affordable housing" in accordance with the Affordable Housing Action Plan.

== Heritage ==
An important feature within the suburb is the Horse Park Wetlands located in the southern central part of the central valley. The Wetlands along with the 'Horse Park Homestead Complex, Sedgeland and Surrounds' are now listed on the Register of the National Estate. The Wetland is an important habitat for Latham's snipe Gallinargo hardwickii, a small bird that migrates annually from South East Australia to north half a semi-sphere away to the climes of Japan and China. The Wetlands and Homestead have also been nominated for inclusion on the ACT Heritage Register.

== Geography ==
Jacka's concept plan specifies green buffers along creeklines, and the inclusion of bushland parks. Jacka's southern boundary where two creeks drain the suburb into Amaroo is its lowest point 628 metres. The suburb rises 80 metres to 708 metres on its eastern boundary. Mostly the suburb covers a valley floor with a line of three hills in a north west line in the western side.

=== Geology ===
The rocks of the area are late middle Silurian period. They are called Canberra Formation and consist of slate, shale, and mudstone with a patch each of dacite, ashstone and tuff.

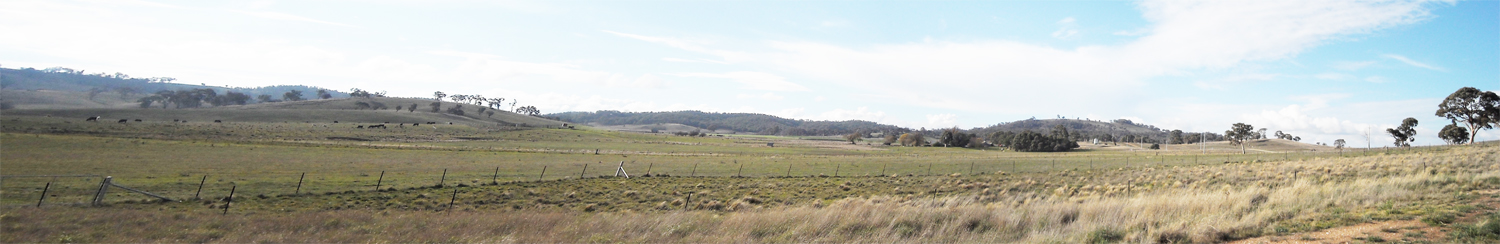
Future site of Jacka suburb with Horse Park Homestead to right, photographed from Horse Park Drive

== See also ==
- Canberra District wine region
