= Robert Jabanungga =

Australian musician (1946–1985)

Robert "Bobby" Mellors Granites Jabanungga, a.k.a. Robert Kantilla, Robert Japanangka, Robert Japananga, and Robert Jabanunga Kantilla (1952–1985), was an Australian TV actor, Aboriginal dancer and musician best known for playing the didgeridoo at many Canberra festivals as well as national and international events. Jabanungga Avenue in the Canberra suburb of Ngunnawal is named in his honour. The word Jabanungga is a skin name.

== Early life ==
Jabanungga was born in 1952 in Yuendumu, a settlement established by the Federal government to deliver rations and welfare services to the Walpiri people. Raised as a Walpiri by foster parents Charlie Driver Jabarula and Emily Driver Nabananga, he had eight brothers and eight sisters and lived in a humpy and hunted kangaroos, goannas, lizards and snakes. He received a traditional Aboriginal education including bush craft, tribal rites and ceremonies.

The Yuendumu community operated within the bounds of a native affairs policies of forced assimilation. His cousins were members of the (Aboriginal) lost generation, in that the authorities forcibly removed them from their tribe and placed them into foster care in a white community.

Jabanungga's tribal group was moved to Mt Doreen Cattle Station, west of Yuendumu and later still to Warrabri, another settlement, where he received the western education alongside his native one.

He was eventually placed with the Mellor family who lived in Alice Springs. Here he finished his schooling and started a butchers apprenticeship. He worked for three years in a local butchers shop. He adopted their family name for a time. During the late 1960s he spent a few years in Adelaide. He relocated to Melbourne in the early 1970s where he worked as a teacher aide at the newly established Debney Meadows Primary School. The school had just introduced a performing arts program integrated with its Australian history syllabus where Jabanungga taught students about aboriginal cultural studies including the corroboree.

Aboriginal actors were in demand for Australia's expanding television industry. He found sporadic work in particular in the ABC-TV series Bellbird and Channel 7's Cash and Company (Tandarra) . Through the 1970s, Jabanungga travelled to Malaysia, Hong Kong and other parts of Asia playing didgeridoo and dancing. He worked as an Aboriginal Culture Advisor for the Victorian Department of Education and Special Services. During the 1980s Jabanungga worked at Aboriginal Studies at "Birrigai", one of Australia's foremost Indigenous Outdoor Education Centres situated in the Brindabella Range, south west of Canberra. Jabanungga died at the age of 33 in 1985.

Jabanungga also performed with the band Goanna in the 1980s. He played the didgeridoo and performed in the video clip of the same name.

== Commentator ==
Robert like many of his generation experienced the culture wars between the indigenous and white communities. He witnessed the brutal regime at Mt Doreen station where the station owner treated "the blacks" as slaves. Aboriginal writer and activist Kevin Gilbert interviewed Jabanungga for the award-winning book Living Black: Blacks Talk to Kevin Gilbert.

Suffering is that the white people class them as the lowest person on earth. Modern Aboriginals are victims of this chain of historical events. I believe that Aborigines should come to view their background a bit more realistically on the surface and with a bit less shame underneath. Aboriginal people were forced to work, if they didn’t, the station owners called the police in. I always thought Australia was different to America, but we had slavery here, too. The people might not have been sold on the blocks like the American Negroes were, but they were owned, just the same.

== Acting credits ==
- Cash and Company (credited as Jabanunga Kantilla) 1975
- Bellbird
