= Hall (district) =

District of the Australian Capital Territory

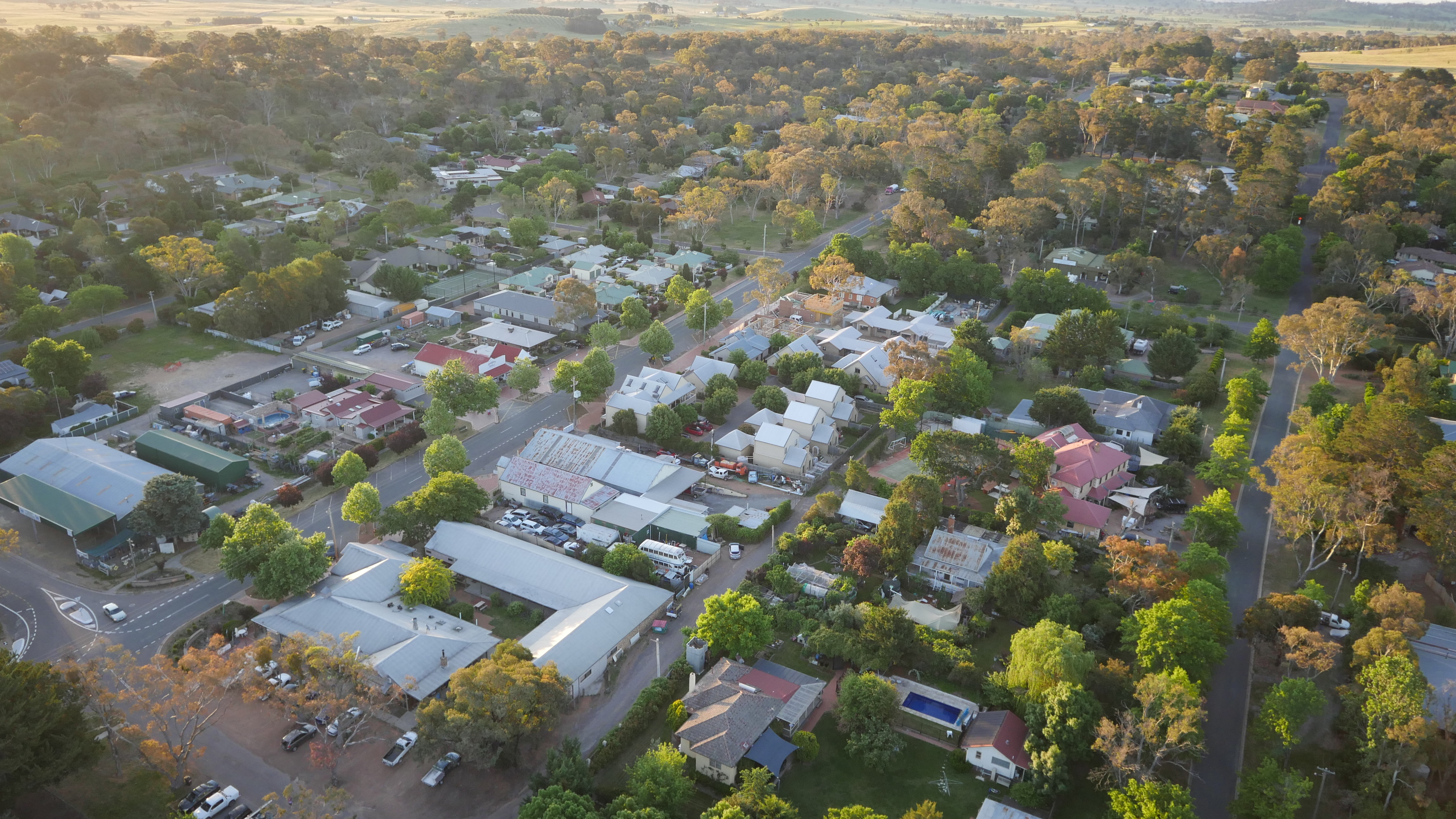
- Partial view of Hall

- Interactive map of Hall
- Coordinates: 35°10′09″S 149°04′09″E
- Country: Australia
- State: Australian Capital Territory

Government
  - Territory electorate: Yerrabi
  - Federal division: Fenner
- Gazetted: 12 May 1966

Hall is a district in the Australian Capital Territory in Australia. Hall is the smallest district in terms of area in the ACT.

== Localities ==
- Hall
