= Bonner, Australian Capital Territory =

Bonner
- Suburb
- Coordinates: 35.16413°S 149.13322°E
- Country: Australia
- State: Australian Capital Territory
- City: Canberra
- District: Gungahlin
- Location: 17 km (11 mi) N of Canberra CBD; 30 km (19 mi) NNW of Queanbeyan; 87 km (54 mi) SW of Goulburn; 284 km (176 mi) SW of Sydney

Government
  - Territory electorate: Yerrabi
  - Federal division: Fenner

Area
  - Total: 2.8 km^{2} (1.1 sq mi)
- Elevation: 633 m (2,077 ft)

Population
  - Total: 7,339 (SAL 2021)
- Postcode: 2914
Suburbs around Bonner
Jacka	Bonner
Amaroo		Forde

Bonner is a suburb in the district of Gungahlin in Canberra in the Australian Capital Territory, Australia.

It is bounded by Horse Park Drive, Mulligans Flat Road, and Roden Cutler Drive and is approximately 4 km (2.5 mi) from the Gungahlin Town Centre and 16 km (9.9 mi) from the centre of Canberra. It is adjacent to the suburbs of Jacka, Amaroo and Forde.

Settlement of the suburb began in 2010, and it had an estimated population of 6,730 at the 2016 census.

== History ==
Bonner is situated on the former paddocks of "Horse Park", a sheep property established in 1853 by Irish immigrants John and Ann Gillespie. From these humble beginnings, the Gillespies increased their pastoral holdings through the judicious acquisitions of neighbouring properties such as "Elm Grove" (situated in present-day Forde).

Their son James Gillespie was instrumental in establishing the Mulligans Flat Public School. The remnants of the school are located in the nearby Mulligans Flat Reserve. Gillespie was a regular contributor to the Goulburn Evening Penny Post under the pseudonym "The Wizard". "Horse Park" homestead which has been nominated for the ACT Heritage Register is situated a kilometre west in the suburb of Jacka.

The suburb is named after Senator Neville Bonner, Australia's first Indigenous parliamentarian, who served the people of Queensland during the years 1971–1984.

In 2008 most of the streets were named. In 2009 three more streets were named after important figures from local Aboriginal communities, including Lamilami, Mondalmi. Settlement of the suburb began in 2010.

The area now known as Bonner lies on the traditional lands of the Ngunnawal people, who have inhabited the region for thousands of years.

== Demographics ==
In the 2016 Census, there were 6,730 people in Bonner. 57.5% of people were born in Australia. The next most common countries of birth were India 9.5%, Sri Lanka 2.3%, Pakistan 2.3%, China 2.3% and Philippines 2.2%. 52.9% of people spoke only English at home. Other languages spoken at home included Hindi 3.3%, Urdu 3.3%, Punjabi 3.0%, Mandarin 2.6% and Telugu 2.5%. The most common responses for religion in Bonner (State Suburbs) were no religion, so described 24.7%, Catholic 20.6%, Hinduism 10.4% and Islam 8.5%.

According to the 2021 Census, Bonner had a population of 7,336 people, with a median age of 32 years.

== Religious organisations ==
The Sisters of Our Lady of Peace have a presence in the local community. The order celebrates the Feast Day of the Presentation of Our Lord on 2 February each year.

== Local facilities ==
A local shopping centre is positioned at the geographical centre of the suburb close to the areas designated for medium-density housing. The local Primary School is at the centre of its catchment, which comprises Bonner, Forde and the southern portion of Jacka. It adjoins the Local Centre and playing fields. Taken together, these facilities create a social nucleus for the new suburb. A local primary school site is located at the centre of Bonner to also serve Forde, to the east, and Jacka to the west. The school is close to the local centre, community facilities, and playing fields. The Mulligans Flat Nature Reserve is situated on the north-eastern edge of the suburb.

== Geography ==
Bonner occupies 283 hectares and at its highest point is situated is 715 metres above sea level (ASL) while its lowest point on the southernmost reach is 624 metres. The suburb slopes southward towards Ginninderra Creek. Oak Hill dominates the northern horizon which is 800 metres above sea level and situated on the north-west boundary of the Australian Capital Territory.

=== Geology ===
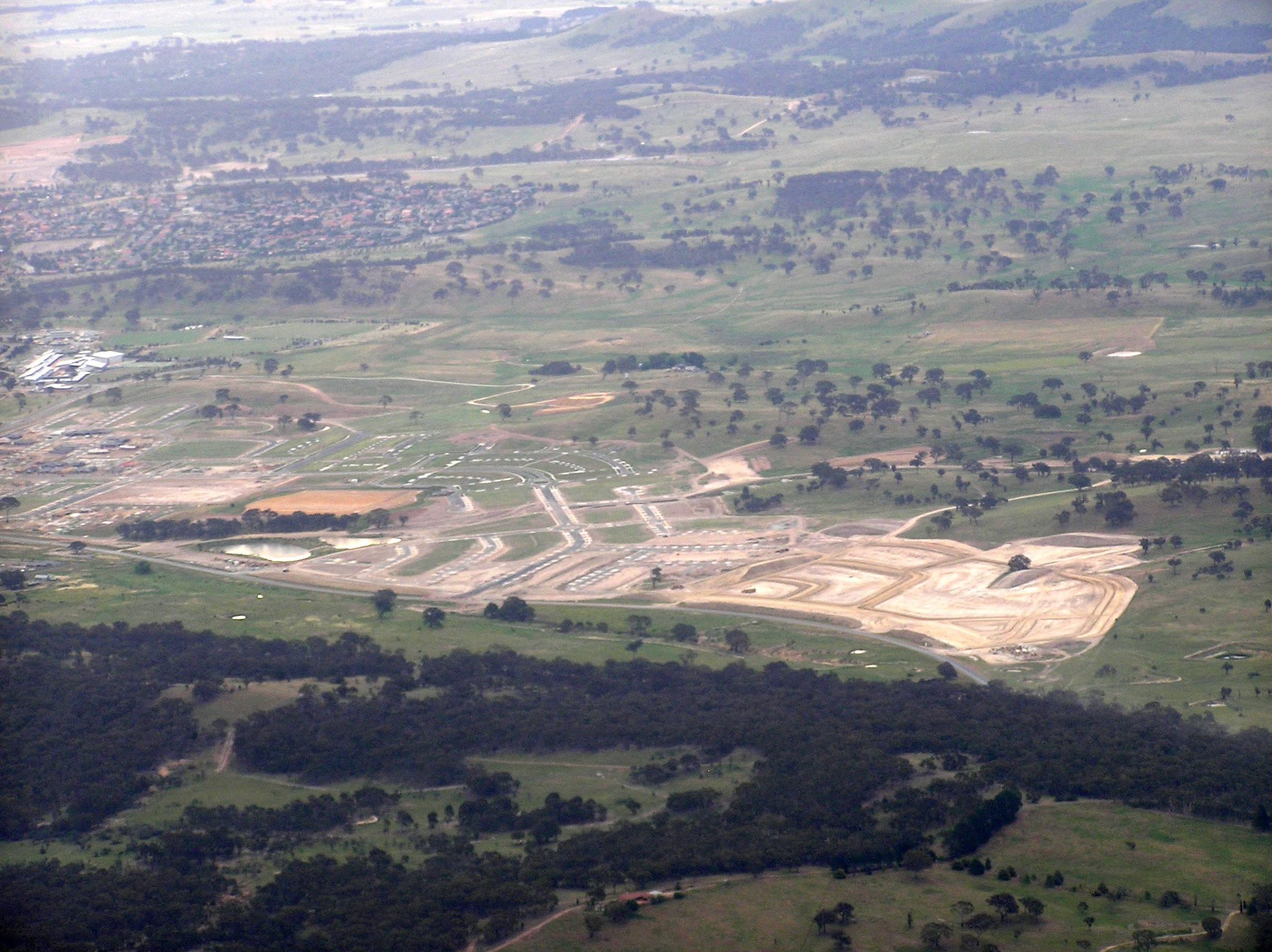
Bonner as seen when under development

Rocks in Bonner are from the late middle Silurian period and are called Canberra Formation. They are mostly slatey shale and mudstone. A band of dacite follows a ridge in the north east direction in the western third. Also ashstone occurs on a hill top in the north west corner of Bonner.

== See also ==
- Canberra District wine region

== Footnotes ==
- "Bonner Community Gathers For Mary Queen of Peace Feast Day".
