= Gungahlin, Australian Capital Territory =

Gungahlin
- Suburb
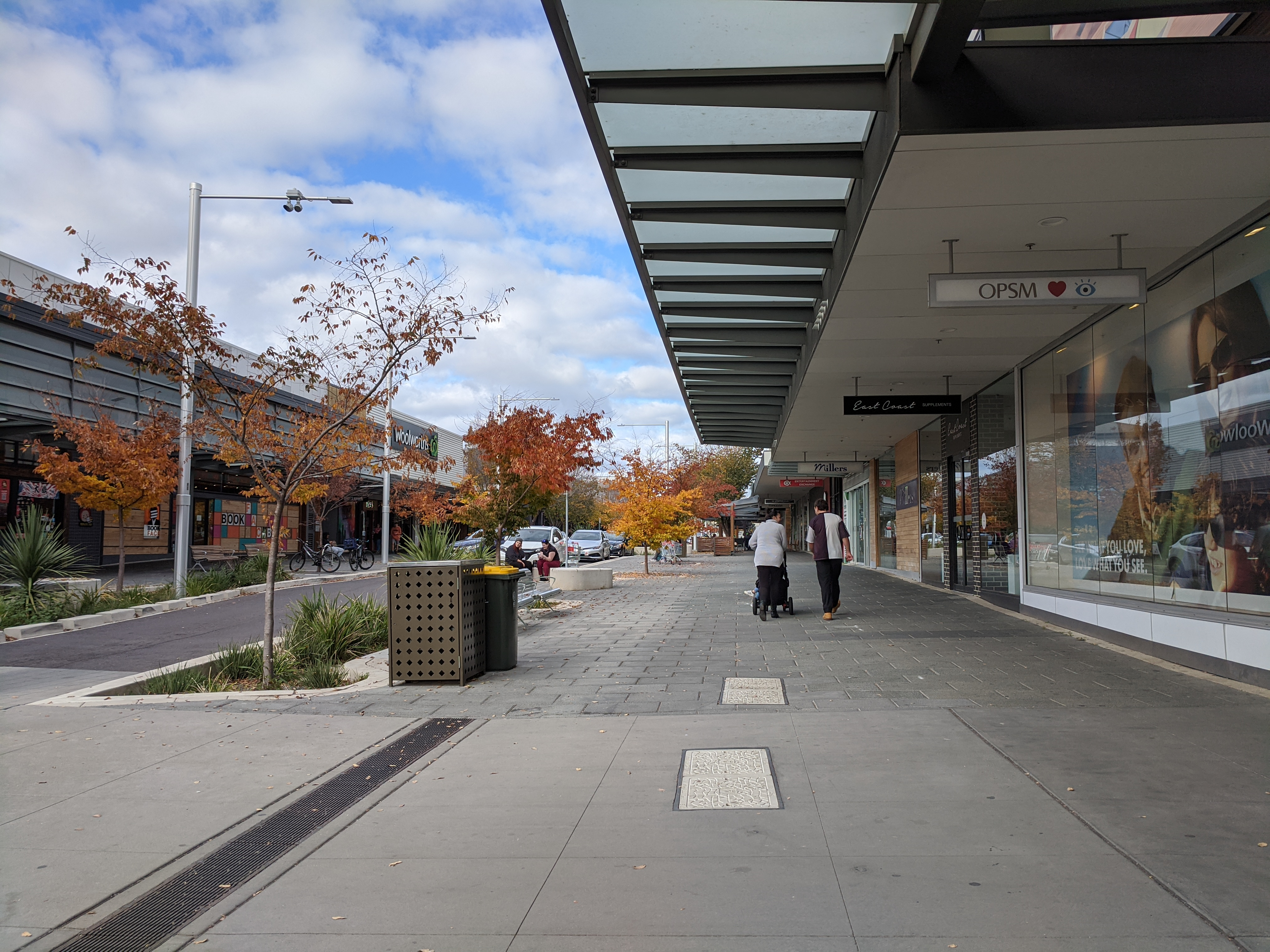
- Hibberson Street in May 2020

- Coordinates: 35°11′00″S 149°07′55″E
- Country: Australia
- State: Australian Capital Territory
- City: Canberra
- District: Gungahlin
- Location: 13 km (8.1 mi) N of Canberra CBD; 30 km (19 mi) NNW of Queanbeyan; 86 km (53 mi) SW of Goulburn; 283 km (176 mi) SW of Sydney
- Established: 1998

Government
  - Territory electorate: Yerrabi
  - Federal division: Fenner

Area
  - Total: 4.6 km^{2} (1.8 sq mi)
- Elevation: 627 m (2,057 ft)

Population
  - Total: 8,586 (SAL 2021)
- Postcode: 2912, 2914, 2913
Suburbs around Gungahlin
Ngunnawal	Amaroo	Forde
Nicholls	Gungahlin	Harrison
Palmerston	Franklin	Harrison

Gungahlin is a suburb of Canberra, Australia. It encompasses the Town Centre for the district of the same name. The postcode is 2912. The name is taken from the homestead of Crace family, who owned the land from 1877 until it was resumed by the Commonwealth with the establishment of the Federal Capital Territory. It is one of the most densely populated suburbs in Canberra

== Gungahlin Town Centre ==
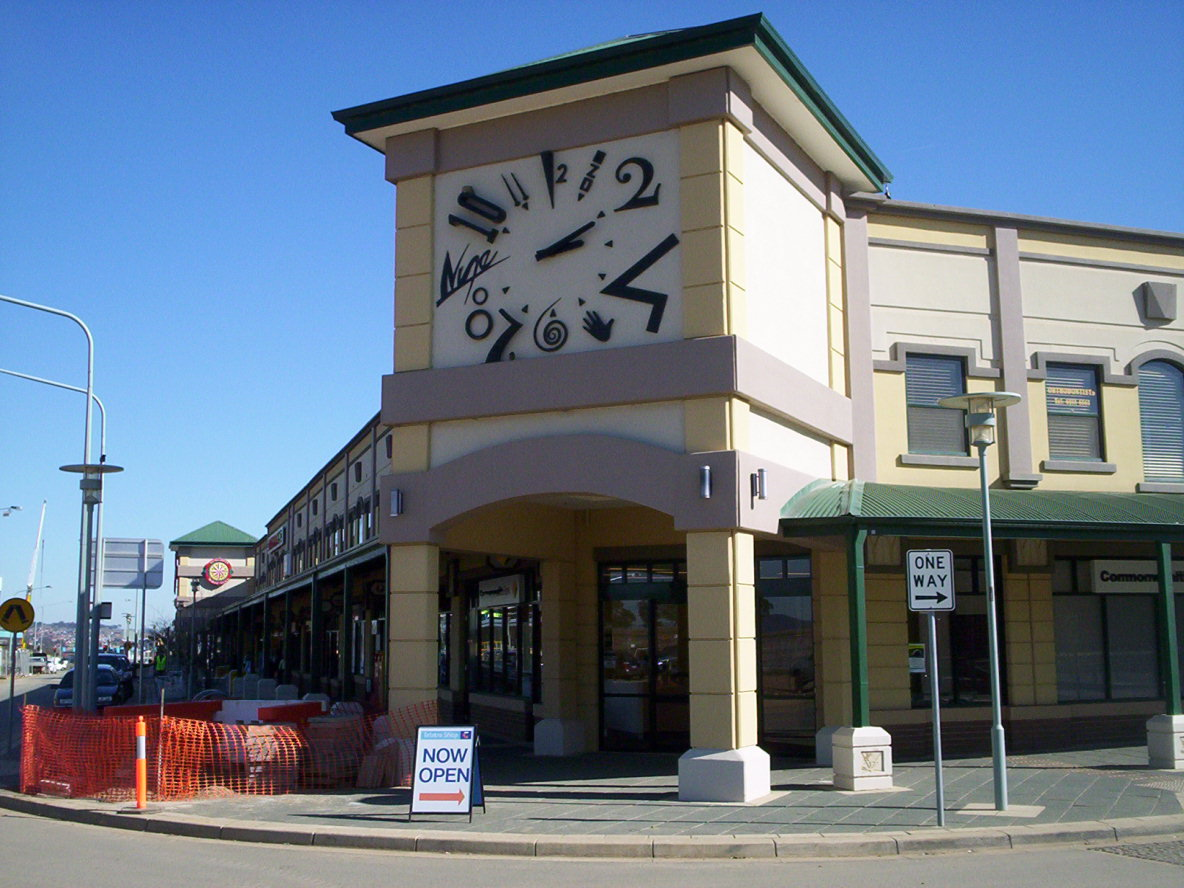
Gungahlin Shopping Centre

Gungahlin Town Centre viewed from above, in 2026

The commercial heart of the Gungahlin Town Centre is Hibberson St, the centre's main street, though the boundary of commercial activities in Anthony Rolfe Avenue, Gundaroo Drive and Gozzard Street. Rather than a single enclosed shopping centre, retail anchor stores developed along Hibberson street in separate developments. There are two licensed clubs in the Town Centre: the Raiders Club located at the intersection of Hibberson and Gozzard Streets; and Eastlake Gungahlin Club located at the intersection of Hinder and Efkarpidis Streets. The Gungahlin Public Library officially opened in June 2011, and adjoining senior high school opened later that year. Burgmann College is located in the suburb of Gungahlin.

== Transport ==
Gungahlin Town Centre is one endpoint of stage 1 of Canberra's Light Rail network. Stage 1 runs from Gungahlin Town Centre to Civic.

== Demographics ==
At the 2021 census, the population of Gungahlin was 8,586, an increase from 5,617 in 2011 and 3,857 in 2006, including 153 (1.8%) Indigenous persons and 4,157 (48.4%) Australian-born persons. The next most common countries of birth were China (8.7%), India (7.5%), Nepal (4.9%), South Korea (3.0%) and Vietnam (1.9%). 48.5% of people spoke only English at home. Other languages spoken at home included Mandarin (9.8%), Nepali (4.7%), Korean (3.2%) and Vietnamese (2.2%). The most common responses for religion were No Religion (39.5%) and Catholic (14.4%). 35.5% of dwellings were separate houses, 17.4% were semi-detached, row or terrace houses or townhouses and 46.5% of were flats or apartments.

== Geology ==
The Gungahlin suburb is underlain by the middle Silurian age Canberra Formation. Most of this is slaty shale and mudstone. But there are also a couple of bands of ashstone in the south and north west. The structure of the rock has been folded by anticlines and a syncline with a north east direction. The Gungahlin Fault is parallel to the folds and passes through the east of the town centre. To the south it passes through Crace, Kaleen, Bruce and Aranda where it stops at the Deakin Fault. The Gungahlin Fault is also parallel to the Winslade Fault and is no doubt connected with it. In the north east direction it passes out of the ACT northern end and ends near the Sullivans Fault.

== Footnotes ==
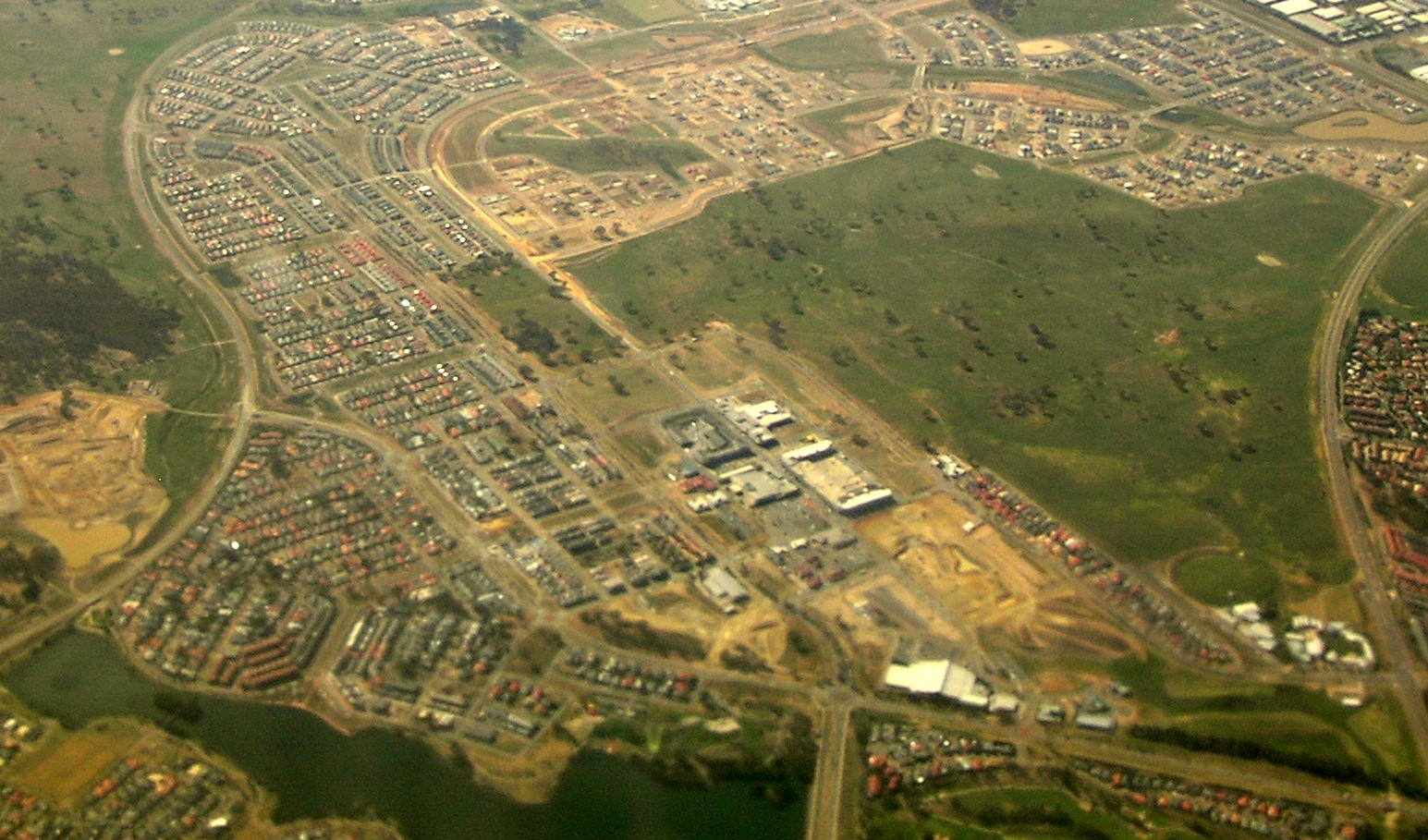
Aerial view from north west
