= Yerrabi electorate =

Yerrabi Australian Capital Territory—Legislative Assembly
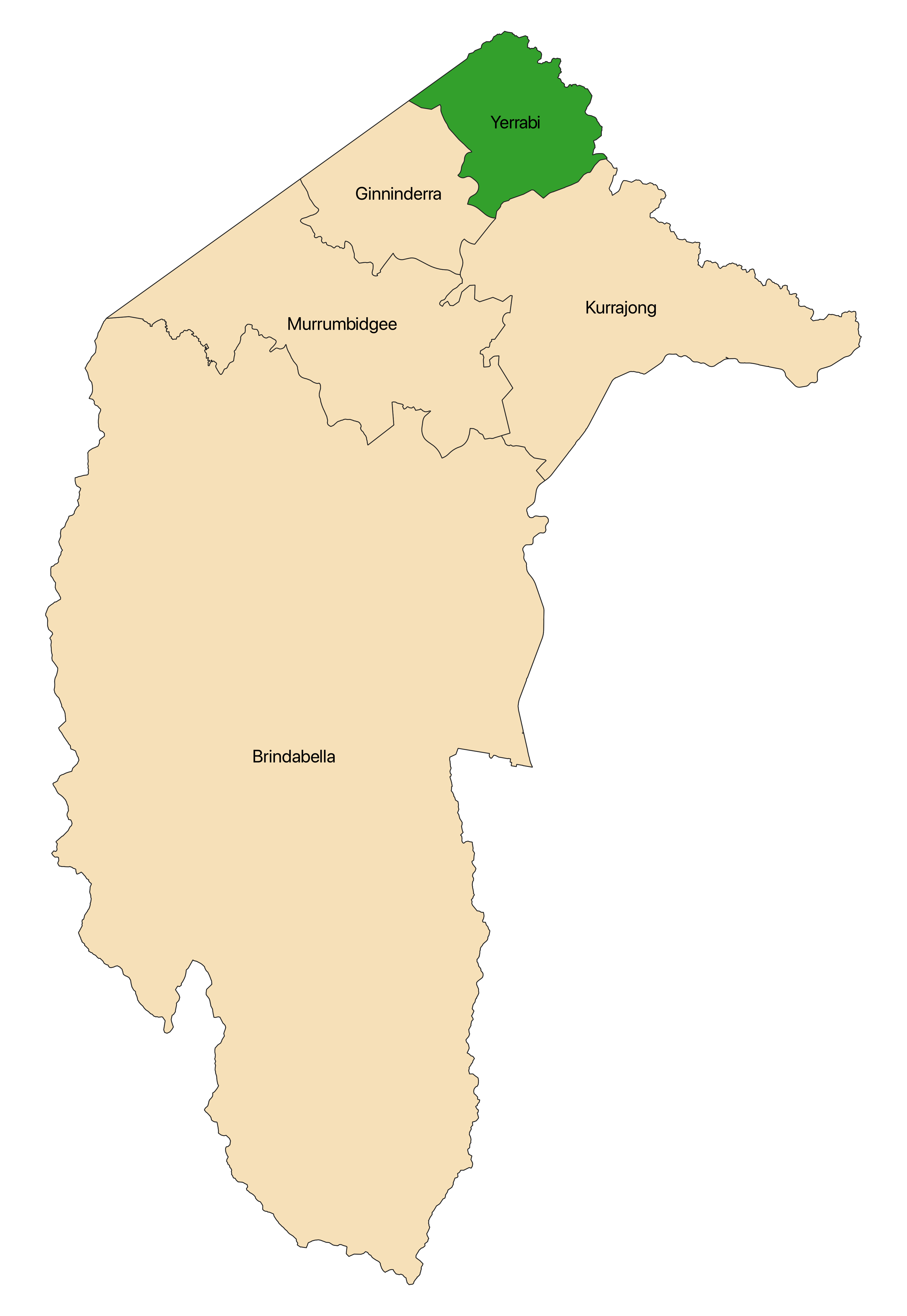
- Territory: Australian Capital Territory
- Created: 2016
- Electors: 59,892 (2020)
- Area: 99 km^{2} (38.2 sq mi)
- Federal electorate: Fenner
- Coordinates: 35°10′55″S 149°7′44″E
Electorates around Yerrabi:
Goulburn (NSW)	Goulburn (NSW)	Goulburn (NSW)
Ginninderra	Yerrabi	Goulburn (NSW)
Ginninderra	Kurrajong	Kurrajong

The Yerrabi electorate is one of the five electorates for the unicameral 25-member Australian Capital Territory Legislative Assembly. It elected five members at the 2016 ACT election.

== History ==
Yerrabi was created in 2016, when the five-electorate, 25-member Hare-Clark electoral system was first introduced for the Australian Capital Territory (ACT) Legislative Assembly, replacing the previous three-electorate, 17-member system. The word "Yerrabi" is derived from a word in the Ngunnawal language meaning "go", "walk" or "to leave", and shares its name with Yerrabi Pond in Amaroo which is one of the main water features in the Gungahlin district.

== Location ==
The Yerrabi electorate comprises the entire district of Gungahlin, including the suburbs of Amaroo, Bonner, Casey, Crace, Forde, Franklin, Gungahlin, Harrison, Jacka, Moncrieff, Ngunnawal, Nicholls, Palmerston, Taylor, Throsby, the Belconnen district suburbs of Giralang and Kaleen and the Township of Hall.

When created in 2016 the Yerrabi electorate additionally included the Belconnen suburbs of Evatt, Lawson and McKellar, however following the 2019 electoral redistribution, these suburbs were transferred to the Ginninderra electorate for the 2020 ACT election, making Yerrabi the smallest ACT electorate with an area of 99 km^{2}.

== Members ==
Year	Member	Party	Member	Party	Member	Party	Member	Party	Member	Party
2016	Michael Pettersson	Labor	Suzanne Orr	Labor	Meegan Fitzharris	Labor	James Milligan	Liberal	Alistair Coe	Liberal
2019^{1}	Michael Pettersson	Labor	Suzanne Orr	Labor	Deepak-Raj Gupta	Labor	James Milligan	Liberal	Alistair Coe	Liberal
2020	Michael Pettersson	Labor	Suzanne Orr	Labor	Andrew Braddock	Greens	Leanne Castley	Liberal	Alistair Coe	Liberal
2021^{2}	Michael Pettersson	Labor	Suzanne Orr	Labor	Andrew Braddock	Greens	Leanne Castley	Liberal	James Milligan	Liberal
2024	Michael Pettersson	Labor	Suzanne Orr	Labor	Andrew Braddock	Greens	Leanne Castley	Liberal	James Milligan	Liberal
2026^{3}	Michael Pettersson	Labor	Suzanne Orr	Labor	Andrew Braddock	Greens	Leanne Castley	Independent	James Milligan	Liberal

^{1}Meegan Fitzharris (Labor) resigned on 8 July 2019. Deepak-Raj Gupta (Labor) was elected as her replacement on countback on 23 July 2019
^{2}Alistair Coe (Liberal) resigned on 12 March 2021. James Milligan (Liberal) was elected as his replacement on countback on 26 March 2021
^{<3>}Leanne Castley (Independent) resigned from the Liberal Party on 3 June 2026.

== Election results ==
2024 Australian Capital Territory election: Yerrabi
Party	Candidate	Votes	%	±%
Quota		9,160		
Liberal	Leanne Castley (elected 3)	6,745	12.3	+3.7
Liberal	James Milligan (elected 4)	5,681	10.3	+3.1
Liberal	John Mikita	4,032	7.3	+7.3
Liberal	Krishna Nadimpalli	2,721	5.0	+1.4
Liberal	Ralitsa Dimitrova	1,110	2.0	+2.0
Labor	Michael Pettersson (elected 1)	6,495	11.8	+2.3
Labor	Suzanne Orr (elected 2)	4,906	8.9	+0.8
Labor	Mallika Raj	2,689	4.9	+4.9
Labor	Pradeep Sornaraj	1,679	3.1	+3.1
Labor	Ravinder Sahni	1,073	2.0	+2.0
Greens	Andrew Braddock (elected 5)	3,308	6.0	−0.4
Greens	Soelily Consen-Lynch	1,853	3.4	+3.4
Greens	Alex Gias	1,232	2.2	+2.2
Independents for Canberra	David Pollard	2,769	5.0	+2.4
Independents for Canberra	Sneha KC	1,642	3.0	+3.0
Independents for Canberra	Trent Pollard	460	0.8	+0.8
Independents for Canberra	Vikram Kulkarni	449	0.8	+0.8
First Nation	Cooper Pike	969	1.8	+1.8
First Nation	Lisa Barnes	191	0.3	+0.3
First Nation	Michael Duncan	142	0.3	+0.3
First Nation	Tyson Powell	127	0.2	+0.2
First Nation	Kye Moggridge	88	0.2	+0.2
Democratic Labour	Michael Hanna	821	1.5	+1.5
Democratic Labour	Colin Jory	493	0.9	+0.9
Family First	Greg Amos	706	1.3	+1.3
Family First	Henry Kivimaki	410	0.7	+0.7
Belco	Jason Taylor	584	1.1	+1.1
Belco	Gregory Burke	304	0.6	+0.6
Independent	Fuxin Li	502	0.9	−0.3
Animal Justice	Joanne McKinley	402	0.7	+0.7
Independent	Mohammad Munir Hussain	371	0.7	+0.5
Total formal votes		54,954	98.0	−0.5
Informal votes		1,095	2.0	+0.5
Turnout		56,049	87.6	−2.0
Party total votes
Liberal		20,289	36.9	−3.7
Labor		16,842	30.6	−3.5
Greens		6,393	11.6	+1.5
Independents for Canberra		5,320	9.7	+9.7
First Nation		1,517	2.8	+2.8
Democratic Labour		1,314	2.4	−2.3
Family First		1,116	2.0	+2.0
Belco		888	1.6	+1.6
Independent	Fuxin Li	502	0.9	−0.3
Animal Justice		402	0.7	−0.6
Independent	Mohammad Munir Hussain	371	0.7	+0.5
Liberal hold		Swing	+3.7	
Liberal hold		Swing	+3.1	
Labor hold		Swing	+2.3	
Labor hold		Swing	+0.8	
Greens hold		Swing	−0.4	

== See also ==
- Australian Capital Territory Electoral Commission
- Australian Capital Territory Legislative Assembly
