= Division of Fenner =

Australian federal electoral division

Coordinates: 35.236°S 149.111°E

Fenner Australian House of Representatives Division
- Interactive map of boundaries since the 2019 federal election (excluding the Jervis Bay Territory)
- Created: 2016
- MP: Andrew Leigh
- Party: Labor
- Namesake: Frank Fenner
- Electors: 105,447 (2025)
- Area: 238 km^{2} (91.9 sq mi)
- Demographic: Inner metropolitan
- Territory electorate: Ginninderra: Yerrabi
Electorates around Fenner:
Gilmore (From; Jervis Bay exclave); Riverina (NSW)	Riverina (NSW)	Riverina (NSW)
Riverina (NSW)	Fenner	Canberra
Riverina (NSW)	Bean	Canberra

The Division of Fenner is an Australian Electoral Division in the Australian Capital Territory and the Jervis Bay Territory. It includes Gungahlin, north-western Belconnen and the Jervis Bay Territory. It is named for distinguished virologist Frank Fenner. It is currently held by Andrew Leigh of the Labor Party.

== Geography ==
Federal electoral division boundaries in Australia are determined at redistributions by a redistribution committee appointed by the Australian Electoral Commission. Redistributions occur for the boundaries of divisions in a particular state or territory, and they occur every seven years, or sooner if a state or territory's representation entitlement changes or when divisions of a state or territory are malapportioned.

Fenner is a non-contiguous division, with the bulk of the seat encompassing the north eastern portion of the Australian Capital Territory, and another covering the Jervis Bay Territory. As of the 2019 federal election, Fenner includes the districts of Gungahlin and Hall, and the part of Belconnen north of Belconnen Way and west of Eastern Valley Way, Aikman Drive and William Slim Drive, in addition to the entirety of the Jervis Bay Territory.

== History ==
Fenner replaced the abolished Division of Fraser from 2016. Fraser was always a safe seat for the Australian Labor Party.

The Australian Electoral Commission decided that, with effect from the 2016 election, the former Division of Fraser would be changed to the Division of Fenner, to honour scientist Frank Fenner. The name change was due to plans by the AEC to name a seat in Victoria after former prime minister Malcolm Fraser. The proposed name change met with opposition from a number of ACT residents. For instance, former ACT Chief Minister Jon Stanhope said that the name change "traduces" the legacy of Jim Fraser, the MP for Division of Australian Capital Territory from 1951 to 1970 and a man "close to the heart of Canberrans." He also claimed that Fenner himself would have objected to the proposal.

Fenner originally included the land in the ACT north of the Molonglo River and Lake Burley Griffin, including the districts of Belconnen, Gungahlin, North Canberra, except Civic, Acton, Turner south of Haig Park and east of Sullivans Creek, Braddon south of Haig Park, Reid, Campbell and Pialligo.

At the 2018 redistribution, it lost all of its territory in North Canberra, the rural districts of Majura and Kowen and the Belconnen suburbs of Aranda, Bruce, Cook, Giralang, Hawker, Kaleen, Lawson, Macquarie and Weetangera to Canberra.

== Members ==
Image	Member	Party	Term	Notes
	Andrew Leigh (1972–)	Labor	2 July 2016 – present	Previously held the Division of Fraser. Incumbent

== Election results ==
2025 Australian federal election: Fenner
Party	Candidate	Votes	%	±%
Labor	Andrew Leigh	50,819	53.80	+5.49
Liberal	Bola Olatunbosun	20,723	21.94	−5.90
Greens	Dani Hunterford	15,492	16.40	−0.35
Family First	Elizabeth Kikkert	7,426	7.86	+7.86
Total formal votes		94,460	97.38	+0.08
Informal votes		2,540	2.62	−0.08
Turnout		97,000	92.01	+0.50
Two-party-preferred result
Labor	Andrew Leigh	68,088	72.08	+6.39
Liberal	Bola Olatunbosun	26,372	27.92	−6.39
Labor hold		Swing	+6.39	
