= Farrer Memorial Trust =

Memorial trust in Australia

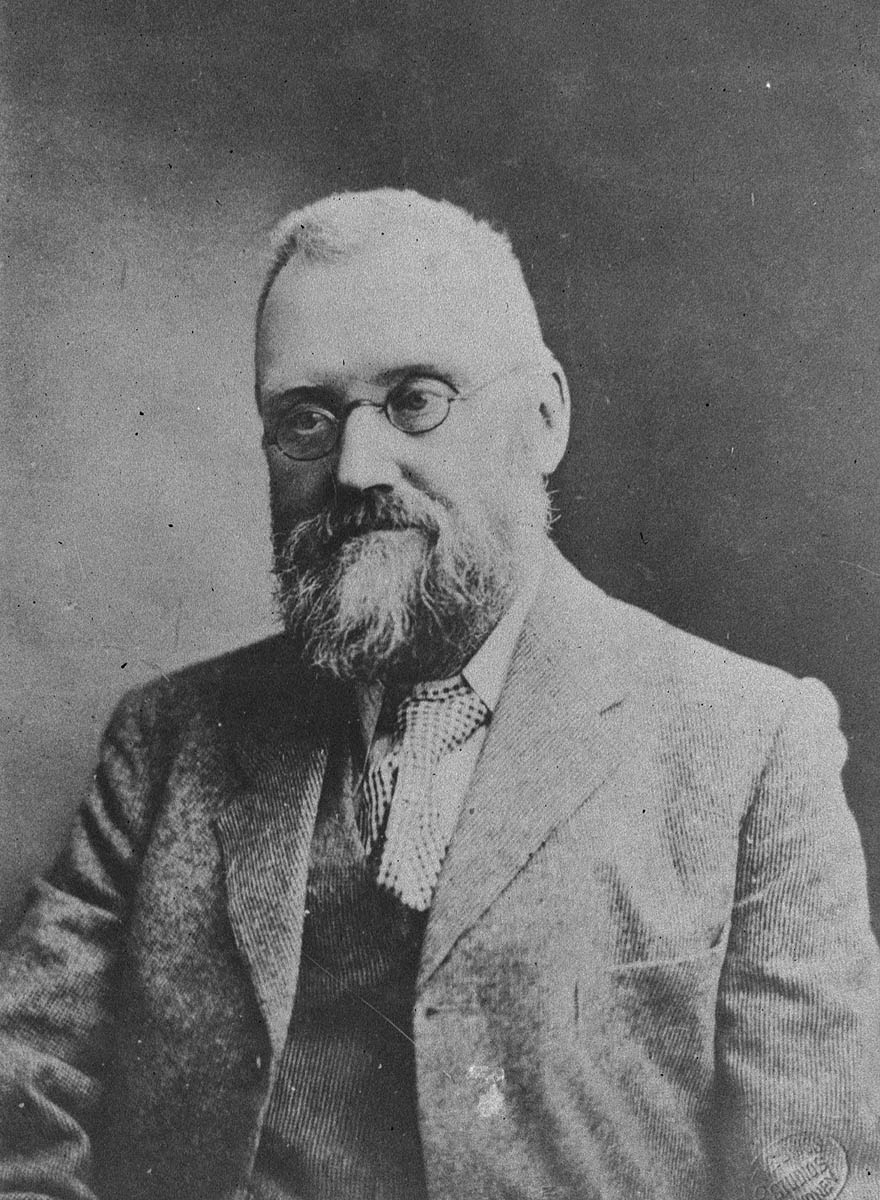
William Farrer

The Farrer Memorial Trust was established in 1911 in Australia in memory of William Farrer. Initially established to provide study scholarships to Agricultural Scientists, the Trust became responsible in 1941 for the annual presentation of the Farrer Memorial Oration and awarding the Farrer Medal.

== William Farrer and the Farrer Memorial Trust ==
William Farrer was a surveyor who turned his hand to farming in 1886 near where Canberra now stands. Initially he planted grape vines but the conditions were not suitable, so he then decided to plant wheat. Due to weather conditions his first two harvests where damaged by rust, which spurred Farrer to develop strains that were resistant to rust. In 1900, he was successful with a variety he named Federation after the imminent Federation of Australia. When Farrer died suddenly in 1906 a committee was created to raise funds needed to establish a Memorial Trust. On 16 October 1911, the Trust received the funds with a set of instructions, enabling it to provide research grants and scholarships to further agricultural science in Australia.

== Farrer Medal ==
In 1935, Frank Gallagher formed a committee to create the Farrer Memorial Oration, to be given by a person with an agricultural background. The first oration was by Tasmanian farmer and Australian Prime Minister Joseph Lyons at the Star Theatre, Queanbeyan on 3 April 1936, the birthday of William Farrer. At the end of the oration children from the Queanbeyan Intermediate High School presented Lyons with a silver medallion, which is now on display at Adolph Basser Library, Canberra. In 1941, Gallagher handed over the organisation of the Farrer Memorial Oration to the Farrer Memorial Trust.

=== Recipients ===
Source: NSW Department of Primary Industries

- 1936 – J.A. Lyons
- 1937 – G.L. Sutton
- 1938 – W.L. Waterhouse
- 1939 – not awarded
- 1940 – not awarded
- 1941 – not awarded
- 1942 – not awarded
- 1943 – S.L. Macindoe
- 1944 – John Theodore Pridham
- 1945 – not awarded
- 1946 – H. Wenholz
- 1947 – Samuel MacMahon Wadham
- 1948 – J.A. Prescott
- 1949 – W.L. Waterhouse
- 1950 – Robert Dickie Watt
- 1951 – Laurence J.H. Teakle
- 1952 – Bertram Thomas Dickson
- 1953 – A.T. Pugsley
- 1954 – Allan Robert Callaghan
- 1955 – E.A. Southee
- 1956 – A.F. Bell
- 1957 – J.G. Crawford
- 1958 – I.A. Watson
- 1959 – R.J. Noble
- 1960 – H.J. Geddes
- 1961 – Howard Carlyle Forster
- 1962 – O.H. Frankel
- 1963 – R. N. Robertson
- 1964 – Prof C.M. Donald
- 1965 – J.R.A. McMillan
- 1966 – G. Edgar
- 1967 – E.J. Underwood
- 1968 – E.M. Hutton
- 1969 – C.S. Christian
- 1970 – J. Melville
- 1971 – E.E. Bond
- 1972 – J.M. Vincent
- 1973 – D.F. Waterhouse
- 1974 – Helen Newton Turner
- 1975 – John S. Gladstones
- 1976 – R.A. McIntosh
- 1977 – D.J. McDonald
- 1978 – Walter Ives
- 1979 – L.T. Evans
- 1980 – R.H. Martin
- 1981 – N.F. Derera
- 1982 – J.P. Quirk
- 1983 – J.R. Syme
- 1984 – W.V. Single
- 1985 – C.M. Francis
- 1986 – D.E. Byth
- 1987 – J.L. Dillon
- 1988 – A.N. Smith
- 1989 – M.H. Campbell
- 1990 – D.H.B. Sparrow
- 1991 – John W. Longworth
- 1992 – E.F. Henzell
- 1993 – D.E. Smiles
- 1994 – B.S. Fisher
- 1995 – E.N. Fitzpatrick
- 1996 – C.D. Blake
- 1997 – T.J. Flugge
- 1998 – M.N. Kinsella
- 1999 – W.J. Peacock
- 2000 – W.A. Vertigan
- 2001 – R.A. Hare
- 2002 – Gil Hollamby
- 2003 – L. Lewin
- 2004 – R.J. Clements
- 2005 – John Williams
- 2006 – John A.G. Irwin
- 2007 – T. Fischer AM
- 2008 – Philip Cocks
- 2009 – R.J. Mailer
- 2010 – M.L. Poole
- 2011 – C.R. Wellings
- 2012 – Graeme Hammer
- 2013 – Andrew Inglis AM
- 2014 – Liz Dennis
- 2015 – Joe Panozzo
- 2016 – Ted Knights
- 2017 – John Kirkegaard
- 2019 – Tim Reeves
- 2020 – Lindsay O’Brien
- 2021 – Rudi Appels
- 2022 – Richard Trethowan
- 2023 – Kevin Moore
- 2024 – Andrew Barr
- 2025 – Robert Park

== See also ==
- List of agriculture awards
- List of prizes named after people
