= George Lowe Sutton =

Australian agricultural scientist and breeder of wheat

George Lowe Sutton (23 October 1872 – 11 January 1964) was an Australian agricultural scientist and breeder of wheat. In 2005 he was elected to the Royal Agricultural Society of Western Australia Hall of Fame.

Sutton was born in Lancashire, England. In 1882 his widowed mother took him to New South Wales, where he studied at Sydney Boys High School. After dairy-farming and working in Queensland, he was appointed experimentalist at Hawkesbury Agricultural College, later becoming a lecturer. There he became a friend of William Farrer.

Sutton opened an experimental farm at Cowra, New South Wales doing wheat-breeding work for the Department of Agriculture. After Farrer died in 1906, Sutton was head of wheat-breeding in New South Wales.

In 1911, Sutton was appointed agricultural commissioner for the Western Australian Wheatbelt. Drought affected wheat yields in the years after Sutton's appointment, and he cross-bred varieties to produce the wheat leaf rust-resistant variety Nabawa. From 1 July 1921 to 31 October 1937, Sutton was Director of Agriculture in Western Australia – the first to hold this role. Sutton produced a new standard for wheat, 'W.A. Standard White', which went further than the previous 'Fair Average Quality' standard which had been in use in Australia.

In 1937, Sutton was awarded the Farrer Memorial Medal. He died in Mount Lawley on 11 January 1964, and was buried in Karrakatta Cemetery.
