= Albert Pugsley =

- Born: 11 March 1910; Mildura, Victoria, Australia
- Died: 6 November 2002 (aged 92)
- Education: Bachelor of Agricultural Science, University of Melbourne; Doctor of Science degree, University of Adelaide
- Known for: Agricultural Scientist

Albert Tonkin Pugsley AM (11 March 1910 – 6 November 2002) was an Australian agricultural scientist and wheat breeder.

== Early life ==
Pugsley was born in Mildura, Victoria and educated at Scotch College, followed by the University of Melbourne where he graduated in 1931 with a Bachelor of Agricultural Science degree. Pugsley later studied at the University of Adelaide, where he was awarded a Doctor of Science degree in 1954 for his research on disease resistance in plants.

== Career ==
Pugsley was a plant pathologist at the Victorian Department of Agriculture (1931–1939) and plant geneticist at the University of Adelaide's Waite Agricultural Institute, South Australia (1939–1953).

In 1953, Pugsley was appointed founding Director of the Agricultural Research Institute in Wagga Wagga, New South Wales, serving in that role until 1975. Now part of the Wagga Wagga campus of Charles Sturt University, the road leading to the original research institute building - now the Graham Centre for Agricultural Innovation - was renamed 'Albert Pugsley Place' in his honour in 2005.

== Legacy ==
Pugsley was awarded the William Farrer Medal in 1953 for his services to agriculture. He was made a Member of the Order of Australia in the 1981 Australia Day Honours. From 1978 to 1986 he served as an honorary Senior Associate in Plant Sciences at the University of Melbourne, and was a granted an honorary Doctorate of Agricultural Science by the university in 1981.

The wheat variety "Pugsley" was named in his honour.
