= 1981 Australia Day Honours =

The 1981 Australia Day Honours were announced on 26 January 1981 by the Governor General of Australia, Sir Zelman Cowen.

The Australia Day Honours are the first of the two major annual honours lists, announced on Australia Day (26 January), with the other being the Queen's Birthday Honours which are announced on the second Monday in June.

== Order of Australia ==
Order of Australia (Civil) ribbon

Order of Australia (Military) ribbon

=== Companion of the Order of Australia (AC) ===
Recipient	Citation	Notes
Emeritus Professor Alec Derwent Hope OBE	For service to literature.	
Sir William (John) Kilpatrick KBE	For community service.	
Sir Charles (Gullan) McGrath OBE	For service to industry.	

=== Officer of the Order of Australia (AO) ===
==== General Division ====
Recipient	Citation	Notes
Dr Neville Coleman Davis	For service to medicine, particularly in the field of melanoma research.	
Professor Lance Aubrey Endersbee	For service to engineering.	
Gordon Peter Fitzgerald	For service to the retailing industry and to the community.	
John McKenzie Hillard	For service to the accounting profession.	
Dr Jacques Francis Albert Pierre Miller	For service to medical research.	
His Excellency John Russell Rowland	For public service as a diplomatic representative.	
The Honourable, Justice John Bernard Sweeney	For service to the Law.	
Roy Woodall	For service to the mining industry.	
Emeritus Professor Hill Wesley Wonder	For public service in the field of metallurgy and industrial technology.	

==== Military Division ====
Branch	Recipient	Citation	Notes
Air Force	Air Vice Marshal Selwyn David Evans DSO, AFC	For service to the Royal Australian Air Force, particularly as Chief of Air Force Operations.	
Air Force	Air Vice Marshal Michael Manifold Helsham DFC, QC	For service as Judge-Advocate of the Royal Australian Air Force.	

=== Member of the Order of Australia (AM) ===
==== General Division ====
Recipient	Citation	Notes
Dr Joan Winifred Allsop	For service to adult education.	
Reverend Brother Angelus (Donald Xavier McKinley)	For service to education.	
Harold John Baily	For service to art.	
Dr Maxwell Robert Banks	For service to science and the community.	
Graham Gordon Blackwood	For service to the sport of yachting.	
Joyce Blaiklock	For community service.	
Nancy Roslyn Bundle	For service to nursing.	
Dr Arthur William Burnell	For service to medicine, particularly in the field of domiciliary care.	
Colonel William Ramsay Cairns	For community service with the Salvation Army.	
Robert Elliot Champion	For service to local government and the community.	
John Richard James Clark	For service to the theatre.	
Dr John LLewellyn Colvin	For service to medicine, particularly in the field of ophthalmology.	
Alexander Robert Connel	For service to the community.	
Professor Lloyd Woodrow Cox	For service to the community.	
Ellen Dymphna Cusack	For service to literature.	
Beatrice Deloitte Davis	For service to literature.	
John Noel Whitefoord Elliston	For service to the mining industry.	
Dr Samuel Islwyn Evans	For service to education.	
Peter Leonard Faiman	For service to the media, particularly in the field of television production.	
Vincent James Forde	For service to the Royal Life Saving Society of Australia.	
Harold Wesley Gillard	For community service.	
Dewar Wilson Goode	For service to conservation.	
Isador Goodman	For service to music.	
Major General Roy Russell Gordon CBE, DSO, ED	For community service.	
James Murray Gosper OBE	For service to the building industry and to the community.	
Guy Edward Grey-Smith	For service to art.	
Professor Alfred Gordon Hammer	For service to education in the field of psychology.	
Reginald Harris	For community service.	
Dr Marshall Davidson Hatch	For public service in the field of plant metabolism.	
Crawford Irving Hayes	For service in the field of industrial relations.	
Francis Daniel Hayes	For service in the field of social welfare.	
John William Houston	For parliamentary and community service.	
Dr Herbert Leslie Hughes	For service to medicine, particularly in the field of ophthalmology.	
Tom Morven Jeffrey	For service to the film and television industry.	
Malcolm George King	For service to industry.	
John Frederick Lavis	For service to the dental industry.	
William Morris Lawry	For service to the sport of cricket.	
Jack Lindsay	For service to literature.	
Dr Ian Reay Mackay	For service to medical research.	
William Allan Marshall OBE	For service to literature.	
John Joseph McGuire	For service to the dairy industry.	
Dr George Rex Meyer	For service to education.	
Clive Harlie Monk	For service to engineering.	
Dr Max Clifford Moore	For service to medicine, particularly in the field of ophthalmology.	
Emeritus Professor Charles Edmund Moorehouse	For service to education.	
Nathaniel Albert Alfred Myers	For service to medicine, particularly in the field of paediatrics.	
Bruce Waddell Fieldew Pratt	For service to the publishing industry.	
Dr Albert Tonkin Pugsley	For service to agriculture, particularly in the field of wheat research.	
Eric Gordon Pullen	For service to the fertilizer industry.	
Alexander Leslie Rigby ED	For service to the building industry and to the community.	
Eric Richard Risstrom	For service to commerce and to the community.	
John Justin Roche	For service to local government and town planning.	
Dr Terese Royse-Smith	For service to the dental industry.	
John Louis Rundle	For service to the community.	
George Smith	For community service, particularly in the field of social welfare.	
Ivan Francis Southall DFC	For service to literature.	
Selby Kingston Steele	For service to hospital administration.	
Evonne Rita Sullivan	For community service.	
Newton Stanley Tiver	For service to agriculture, particularly in the field of pasture research.	
Colonel Reno Vardanega	For public service.	
The Honourable Geoffrey Thomas Virgo	For parliamentary and community service.	
Jack Hayward Watson ISO, CStJ	For public and community service.	
The Honourable John Alexander Weir	For service to trade unionism.	
Garth de Burgh Welch	For service to ballet.	
John Oswald Wicking	For service to the welfare of handicapped persons.	
Foster Neil Williams	For service to the sport of Australian football.	
Brooks Christian Wilson	For community service.	
Malcolm Leslie Wright	For service to the accounting profession and to the community.	

==== Military Division ====
Branch	Recipient	Citation	Notes
Navy	Captain Henry Alfred Josephs	For service to the Royal Australian Navy, particularly as Australian Naval Attache, Jakarta.	
Navy	Captain Anthony Rockley Horton	For service to the Royal Australian Navy, particularly as Commanding Officer of HMAS Hobart.	
Navy	Commander Gordon Lewis Sheridan	For service as Supply Officer of HMAS Nirimba.	
Army	Lieutenant Colonel Edmond Ross Brown ED	For service in the Army Reserve.	
Army	Lieutenant Colonel Edward Peter Constantine	For service to the Royal Australian Survey Corps.	
Army	Colonel Brian George Florence MC	For service to the Australian Army, particularly as Commandant of Officer Cadet School, Portsea, Vic.	
Army	Colonel David Walter Hanlin	For service to the Australian Army in the field of Army construction.	
Army	Colonel Paul Desmond Lipscombe	For service to the Australian Army Aviation Corps.	
Army	Colonel John Nelson Stein	For service to the Australian Army, particularly in the field of logistics and organisational development.	
Air Force	Group Captain John Maxwell Chesterfield	For service as Commandant of the Royal Australian Air Force Staff College.	
Air Force	Group Captain Marcus De Laune Faunce OBE	For service as a Medical Officer and consultant physician to the Director-General of Air Force Health Services, Royal Australian Air Force.	
Air Force	Wing Commander Robert George Sharp	For service as a staff officer in the Directorate of Air Force Plans, Department of Defence (Air Force).	
Air Force	Wing Commander Allan Jeffrey Pappin	For service as Commanding Officer of Number 34 Squadron, Royal Australian Air Force.	

=== Medal of the Order of Australia (OAM) ===
==== General Division ====
Recipient	Citation	Notes
Edna Parker Adkins	For community service.	
Arthur Reginald Lancelot Alterator	For service to the sport of cricket.	
Franca Antonello	For service in the field of migrant welfare.	
Ronald George Appleyard	For service to art.	
Ronald Haddington Nichols Badger	For community service.	
Thomas John Bastow	For service to the community and to the welfare of ex-servicemen and women.	
The Reverend Dennis Rupert Bazely	For community service.	
Doris Jane Booth	For community service.	
Lewis Boyd	For community service.	
John Stanislaus Brady	For service to local government.	
Laurence Bryan	For service in the field of aboriginal welfare.	
Billie Jeanette Burke	For public service.	
Mona Dora Byrnes	For service to art.	
Sydnor Olive Campbell	For community service.	
Alan Alwyn Carlyle	For service to local government and to the community.	
Neville Richmond Cawthorne	For service to the welfare of ex-service personnel.	
Louis Censky	For service to trade unionism and in the field of migrant welfare.	
John Charlton	For public service.	
Daniel Joseph Clarke	For service to the tourist industry.	
Harry Clifford Clegg	For service to local government.	
Mervyn Douglas Creswell	For service to the community and to the transport industry.	
Audrey Joan Daley	For public service.	
Alice May Davies	For community service.	
Llewella Hope Davies	For community service.	
Alfred James Dickson	For public service and for service to the community.	
Java Joseph Dix	For community service and for service to local industry.	
Gildon Wilson Donnar	For service in the field of industrial relations.	
Henry Arthur Douglas Dowling	For service to the tourist industry.	
Keith Ralph Doyle	For community service.	
Ellen May Dransfield	For community service.	
Edith Dubsky	For service to music.	
Basil Frederick Easther	For service to junior football.	
Douglas Slater Ellice	For public service.	
Cedric Raymond Emanuel	For service to art.	
Lieutenant Colonel Lindsay Keith Farquhar	For service to the Scout Association of Australia.	
Russell Glen Ferguson	For community service.	
Giuesppe Fin	For community service.	
Alfred Stephen Finney	For service to the welfare of ex-service personnel.	
Gwenyth Joyce Fisher	For service to the welfare of handicapped persons.	
Amy Ritchie Forwood	For community service.	
Charles Raymond Foskey	For community service.	
Keith Gaisford	For service to the sport of archery.	
Lita Marjorie Garrard	For community service.	
Cecil Kenneth William Gerrity	For service to the community and to trade unionism.	
Eric Peter Gianakos	For service to the community and to conservation.	
Claude Vincent Gillard	For service to the sport of parachuting.	
Florence Edna Goggins	For community service.	
Alice May Gold	For service to the sport of bowls.	
Graham Lindsay Gordon	For service to the sport of rugby football.	
Roy Lanchester Gowing	For community service.	
(Jessie) Iris Graham	For service to the community and to the arts.	
Thomas Robertson Grimson	For service to the sport of soccer.	
Maxwell Edward Hams	For service to local government.	
Ruby Nance Hansen	For community service.	
James Ross Harbison	For community service.	
Dean Lawrence Harvey	For community service.	
The Reverend Howard Ralph Heaton	For community service.	
Luke William Robert Heffernan	For service to trade unionism.	
Lloyd France Heylan	For service to tennis and football.	
Jessie Fraser Horton	For community service.	
Irene Doris Hoy	For community service.	
Arthur Robert Moore Jackson	For service to the welfare of ex-service personnel.	
Timothy Jacobs	For service to education and to the community.	
Donald Goldberg Jacquier	For community service.	
Stanley Kelly	For service to the community and to conservation.	
Doris Kate Kemp	For service to the welfare of handicapped persons.	
Desmond Francis Kennedy	For service to sport, particularly the promotion of country football.	
Harry David Krantz	For service to trade unionism.	
Andrew Lambros	For service in the field of migrant welfare.	
The Reverend Father John Edward Lander	For service to religion.	
Frederick William Lean	For community service.	
Raymond Mitchell Lentfer	For community service.	
James Hewitt Main	For community service.	
Eric Stanley Marshall	For service in the entertainment industry.	
Donald Sidney Stuart May	For community service.	
Duncan John McColl	For community service.	
John Hector McDonald	For service to the welfare of ex-service personnel.	
Kevin McDonald	For service to the welfare of handicapped children.	
Lionel Stanley McDonald	For service to the sport of surf life saving.	
Sister Carmel McEwan	For service to education.	
Shaun Dudley McIlraith	For service in the field of journalism.	
Hazel Joan McKellar	For service to the community and to nursing.	
Frank Edward McKenzie	For service to education and to the community.	
Robert John McKinney	For service to sport.	
James Archibald McKinnon	For community service.	
Beatrice Dorothy McLean	For community service.	
John Maxwell McLean	For community service.	
Robert Alan McLoughlin	For community service.	
William John Menz	For service to education.	
Arthur Russell Milway	For community service.	
Henry Frederick Minifie	For service to the welfare of handicapped persons.	
Alfred Charles Morris	For service to the sport of casting.	
Millicent May Nethery	For community service.	
Louis Albert Norrak	For community service.	
Lieutenant Commander Arthur Frederick Parry VRD	For service to the welfare of ex-service personnel.	
Olive Kari Parry	For service to the community and to conservation.	
Percy Joseph Parry	For service to the community and to conservation.	
Theodore Michael Pasiczynskyj	For service in the field of migrant welfare.	
Dawn Trezise Grayson Paton MBE	For community service.	
George Perrin	For service in the field of ethnic affairs.	
Joan Perrott	For service in the field of social welfare.	
Edwin Alexander Pound	For community service.	
Susannah Caroline Proctor	For community service.	
Gregory Thomas Prouse	For service to nursing.	
Harold Lindsay Ralph	For service to the sport of athletics.	
The Reverend Father John Christopher Relihan	For service to religion.	
Daphne Mabel Roemermann	For service to education, particularly in the field of speech and drama.	
Frank Charles Rossack	For service to the welfare of mentally handicapped persons.	
Dorothy Rose Sales	For service to the community through the administration of credit union facilities.	
Elsie May Scholes	For community service.	
Reginald Francis Scott	For service to dentistry, particularly in the field of dental prosthetics.	
George Ephraim Sheumack	For service to sport and to the community.	
William Francis Simm	For service to band music.	
Richard Baxter Stuart Sinclair	For community service.	
Elsie Eileen Smith	For community service.	
Lawrence Mervin Smith	For service to the welfare of ex-service personnel.	
William Richard Smith	For service to music and to the community.	
Yvonne Flora Mackinnon Smith	For service to local government and to the community.	
Judith Margaret Sorensen	For service in the field of child welfare.	
Dorothy Maida Stilwell	For community service.	
Alan George Storm	For service in education and to the community.	
Ronald Aubrey Sutton	For service to the welfare of ex-service personnel.	
Carmel Phyllis Taheny	For public service.	
Jeanette Campbell Telford	For service in the field of choral music.	
Mabel Adeline Terry RD	For community service.	
John William Thompson	For service to the sport of horse racing.	
Harold Thomas Edward Tidemann	For service to the arts.	
Mary Grace Tripp	For community service.	
Ella Underwood	For community service.	
Edna Josephine Vincent MBE	For community service.	
Ernest Edward Vine	For community service.	
Arthur William Percival Walker	For community service.	
Alfred Ernest Ward	For service to the sport of tennis.	
Wallace Ainsworth Ward	For service to the community and to the welfare of ex-service personnel.	
Jack Andrew Warren	For public service.	
George Ralph Weslake	For community service.	
Mildred May Whitfield	For community service.	
The Reverend Arthur Latimer Wilkins	For service to the welfare of visually handicapped persons.	
Cornelius Edward Wilson	For service to the welfare of aged persons.	
Mary Helen Campbell Withers	For community service.	
Alexander Penn Wood	For service in the field of choral music and to the community.	
Bevil Edgar Stanley Theodore Bob Philp Woosley	For community service.	
Jean Wright	For community service.	

==== Military Division ====
Branch	Recipient	Citation	Notes
Navy	Warrant Officer Trevor John Gibbs	For service as Air Engineering Officer of HC 723 Squadron.	
Navy	Warrant Officer William Arthur O'Day	For service to the Marine Engineering School.	
Navy	Warrant Officer Edward Joseph Shaw	For service as officer in charge of the Electronic Warfare School, HMAS Watson.	
Army	Warrant Officer Class Two Maxwell John Beck	For service to the Army Reserve.	
Army	Captain John Edward Cotton	For service as an Engineer Works Warrant Officer in the Southern Highlands Province of Papua New Guinea.	
Army	Warrant Officer Class Two Trevor Edward Gilliver	For service in the field of Army Reserve training.	
Army	Warrant Officer Class One Niels Ole Jensen	For service in the maintenance of armoured vehicles.	
Army	Warrant Officer Class One Robert John May	For service as Regimental Sergeant Major of the 1st Battalion, Royal Australian Regiment.	
Army	Warrant Officer Class One Thomas Emmanuel Webster	For service to the Royal Australian Corps of Military Police.	
Air Force	Warrant Officer Ronald John Harbinson	For service as a Warrant Officer, Mess Supervisor, Royal Australian Air Force.	
Air Force	Warrant Officer Trevor Alexander McIntosh	For service as a Warrant Officer Armament Fitter at Number 492 Squadron, Edinburgh, South Australia.	
