= Cuppacumbalong Homestead =

Historic homestead in the Australian Capital Territory

Coordinates: 35°30′48.65″S 149°04′16.27″E

Cuppacumbalong is an historic homestead located near the southern outskirts of Canberra in the Australian Capital Territory. It is also the name of a former 4,000-acre (16 km^{2}) sheep and cattle grazing property that surrounded the homestead near the junction of the Murrumbidgee and Gudgenby rivers. The word Cuppacumbalong is Aboriginal in origin and means 'meeting of the waters'. One of the property's early owners Leopold Fane De Salis made a noteworthy contribution to political life during colonial times and furthermore, Cuppacumbalong has strong connections to the life of William Farrer, the father of the Australian wheat industry.

== James Wright ==
Englishmen James Wright and a friend John Hamilton Mortimer Lanyon migrated to Australia during the early 1830s. In 1833 they were amongst the first squatters to established sheep runs in the Queanbeyan region, building the Lanyon Homestead. In 1835 they acquired several adjoining blocks on the Murrumbidgee River. Wright established Cuppacumbalong located on the southern side of the Murrumbidgee River in 1839. At the time this region was situated outside the Nineteen Counties of New South Wales and despite the uncertainty of land tenure, many squatters ran large numbers of sheep and cattle beyond the boundaries. By one current-day account 'Cuppacumbalong' stretched 30 miles (48 km) southward to presentday Bredbo. In 1848 financial difficulties forced Wright to sell Lanyon to Andrew Cunningham and shift his operations to Cuppacumbalong. Wright sold 'Cuppacumbalong' to the de Salis family in 1855.

== De Salis family ==
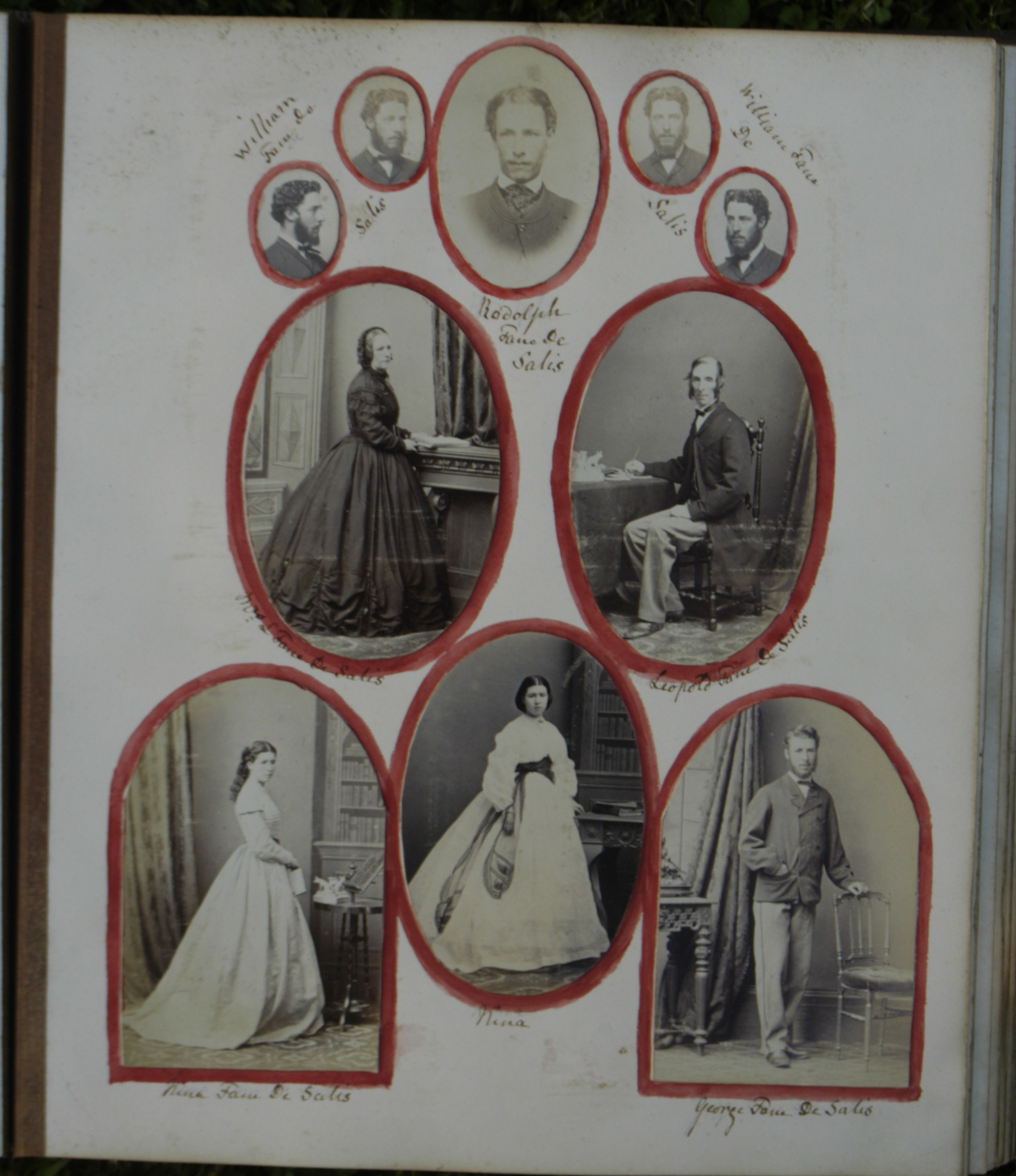
Count Leopold, his wife and children, circa 1870.

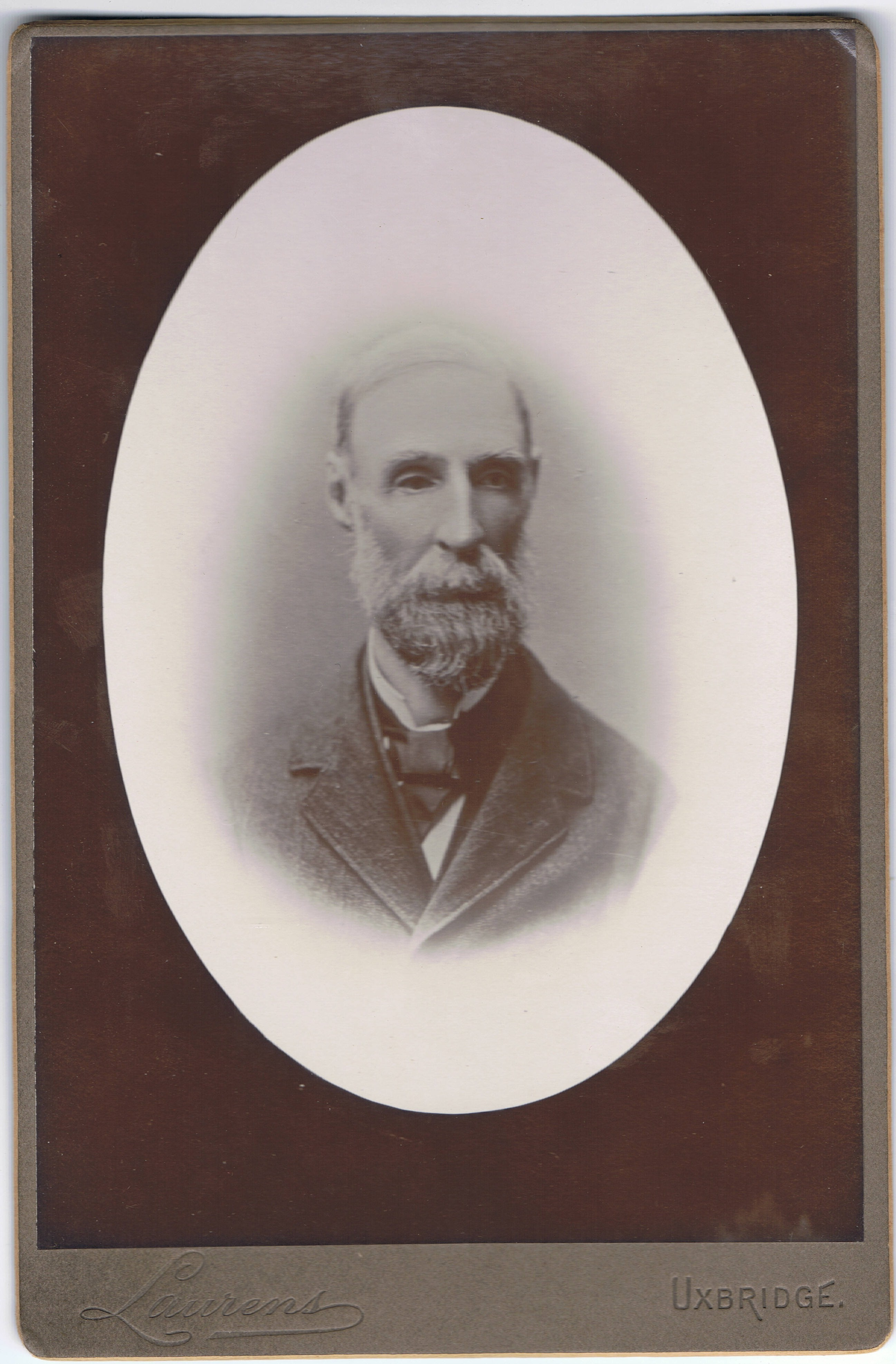
_{Count Leopold, aged c77. Photograph taken in Uxbridge, 1893.}

Leopold Fabius Dietegen Fane de Salis (1816–1898), pastoralist and politician, was born on 26 April 1816 in Florence, Italy, the fourth son of Jerome Fane, fourth Count de Salis, the third son by his third wife Henrietta, a daughter of William Foster (bishop). Sir William Foster Stawell, later the Chief Justice of the Supreme Court of the colony of Victoria was his first cousin.

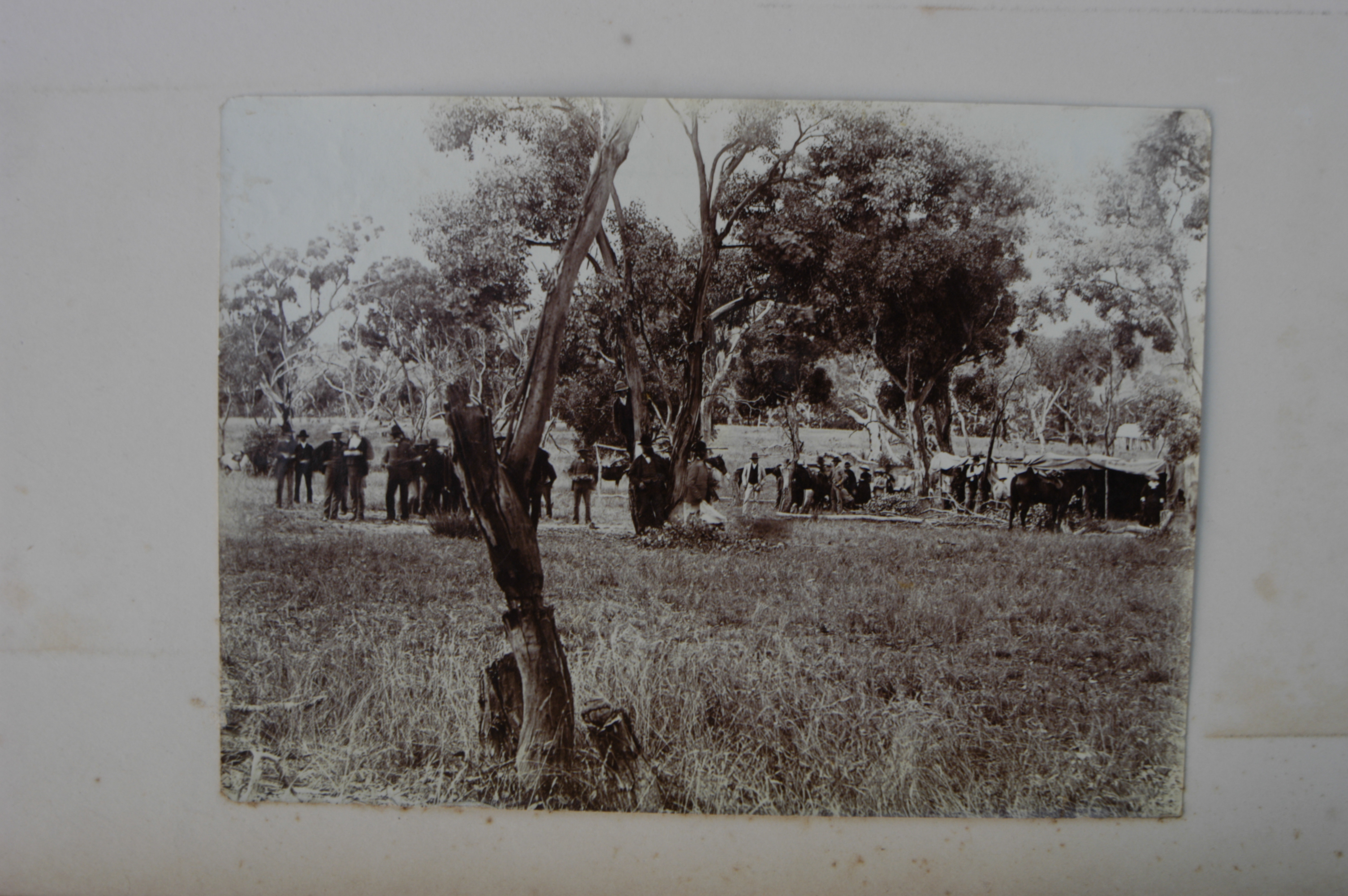
Gum trees and staffage, a De Salis photo, circa 1880.

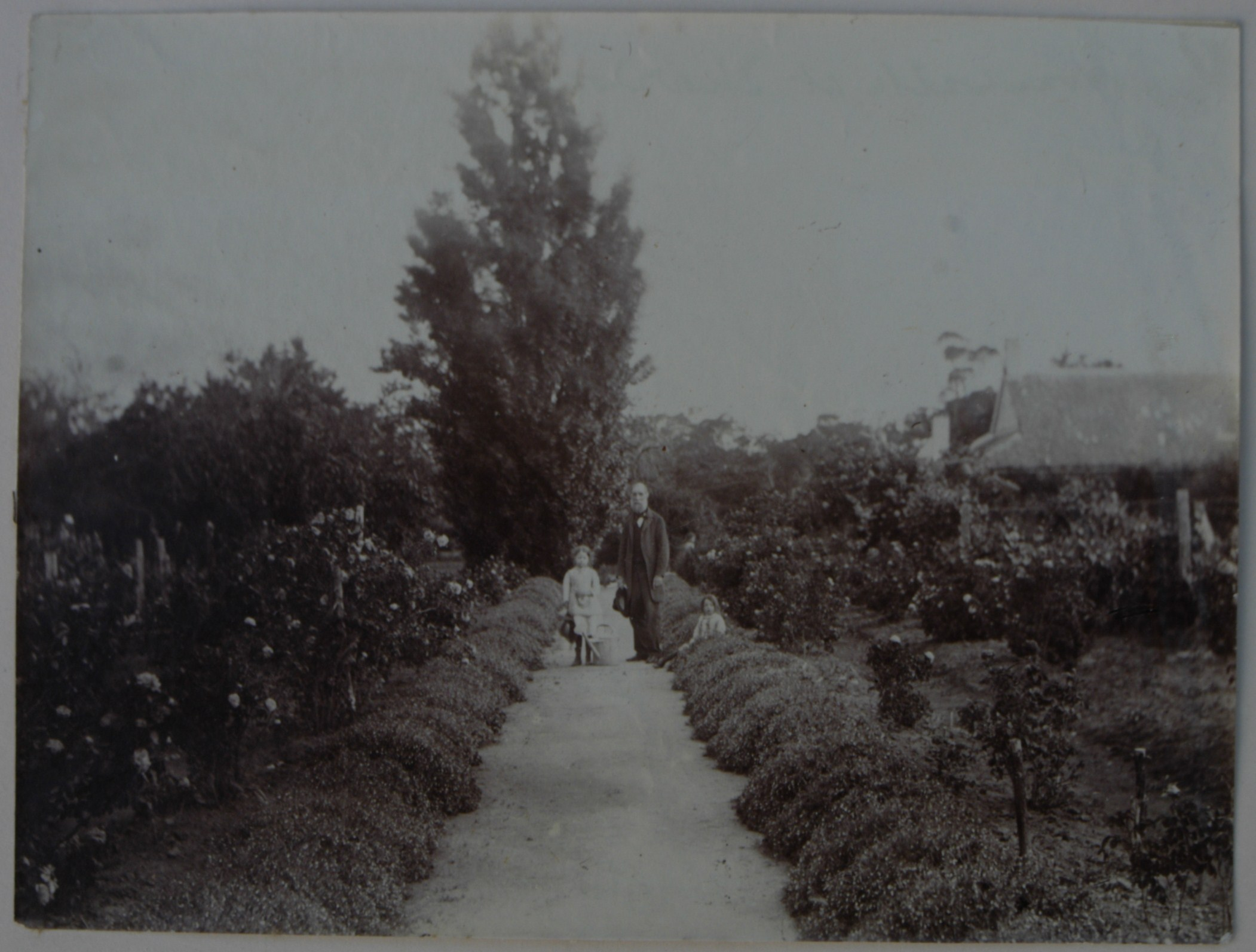
Count Leopold de Salis in an Australian garden, Cuppacumbalong or Lambrigg (?), circa 1890.

De Salis was educated at the English public school Eton College, before completing further studies in sheep farming near Jedburgh, in Scotland. In 1840 at the age of 24, De Salis emigrated to New South Wales where he acquired with a partner the 'Darbalara Station' located on the Murrumbidgee River near Yass. In 1845 he established a run he called Jewnee pastoral station in the Riverina district as well as two others over an 8-year period. As a principal squatter, he was instrumental in opening up to the area to agriculture. After he disposed of these interests, the village (later the township) of Junee was established on this site. He married Charlotte MacDonald in 1844 with whom he had five children; Leopold William (1845–1930), Rodolph (1841–1876), George Arthur Charles, Henry Gubert (1858–1931) and Henrietta Nina (1848-1929). In 1855 the de Salis family bought and relocated to 'Cuppacumbalong' Station situated on the Murrumbidgee River.

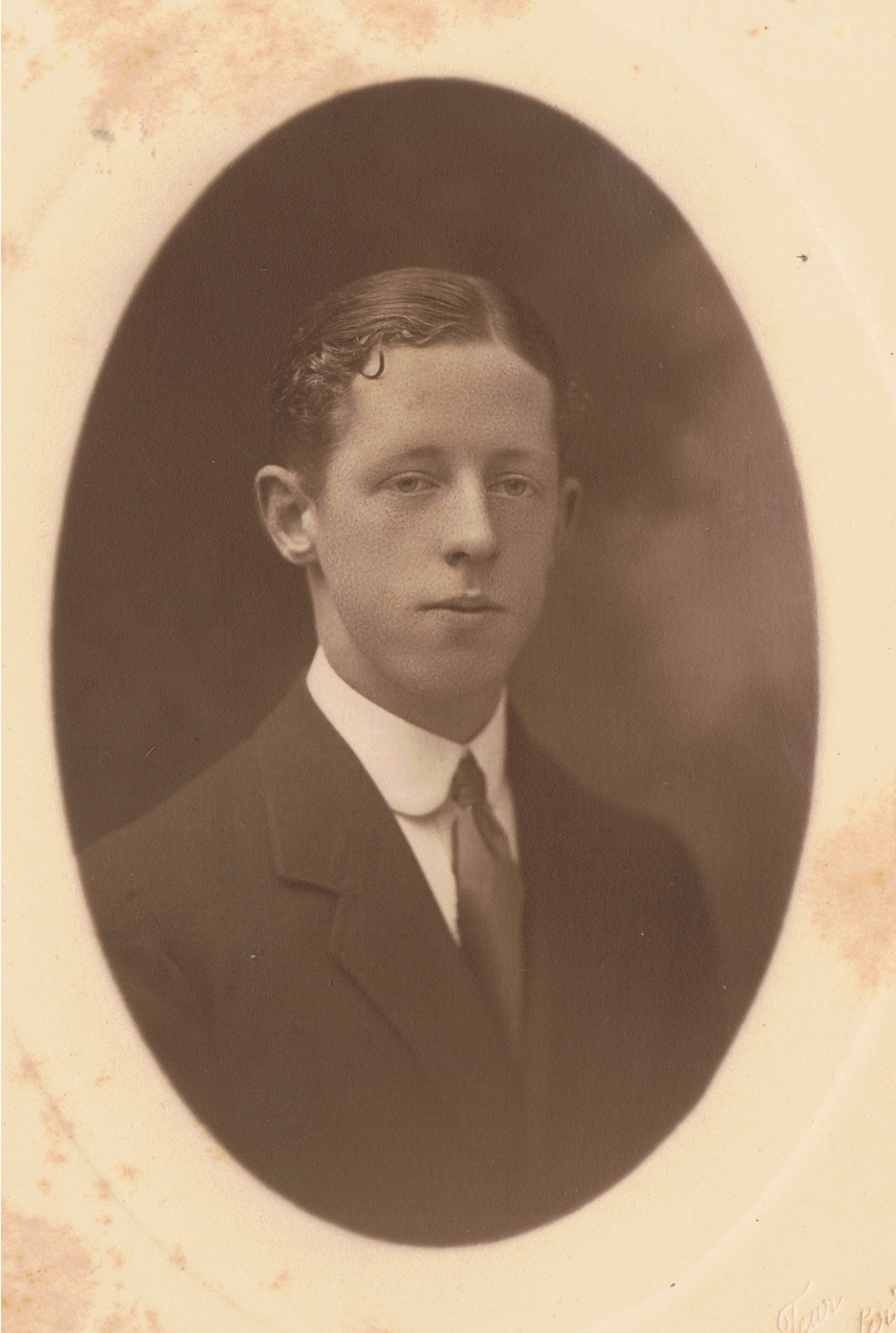
_{John Peter Fabius Fane de Salis (NSW 1897-22.1.1917). Educated: King's School, Parramatta, NSW; Lancing College, UK; Lt. 3rd Batt. Seaforth Highlanders (Ross-shire Buffs, The Duke of Albany's) attached to 2nd Batt. Killed by a shell in a wood near trenches at Bouchavesnes-Bergen, during Operations on the Ancre. Buried (CWGC) Péronne Communal Cemetery Plot V Row P Grave 17, Somme, Picardie. Younger son of Leopold William Jerome, who moved from NSW to Laleham, Staines, 1910.}

Cuppacumbalong was noted for its especially fine wool and magnificent draught horses. De Salis undertook a number of property improvements such as crop irrigation and was a local pioneer in the use of stock dams. The homestead was situated low to the river and was subsequently inundated on a number of occasions by flood waters during de Salis' time.

Within six years of the family's arrival in the Queanbeyan district the Robertson Land Acts was passed into law in New South Wales. These measures were designed to wrest control of land away from the squatocracy and encourage the takeup of land by smaller more productive landholders (selectors). De Salis quickly registered several parcels of land under the names of various family members and dummies to retain ownership of 'the flats', the river flats that backed onto the Murrumbidgee River. In doing so he eventually consolidated his family's land holding and 'converted' his squatter run into a de facto 'freehold estate'.

Leopold's only daughter Nina married scientist William Farrer in 1882. De Salis gave the newly-weds 97 hectares of his property, which the Farrers later named Lambrigg.

In 1869 the De Salis family acquired the Nass; and Nass Valley squatting runs located in Upper Murrumbidgee area and later still purchased the Coolemon run high in the Brindabella Ranges. Later in the 1870s his sons acquired stations in Queensland, most notably Strathmore, located near the township of Bowen. Leopold's immediate elder brother William Fane De Salis, who visited New South Wales in 1842, 1844 and 1848, was an important collaborator, and held a number of prominent positions including the chairmanship of the London Chartered Bank of Australia and P&O. William used his financial connections to help his brother finance these pastoral operations.

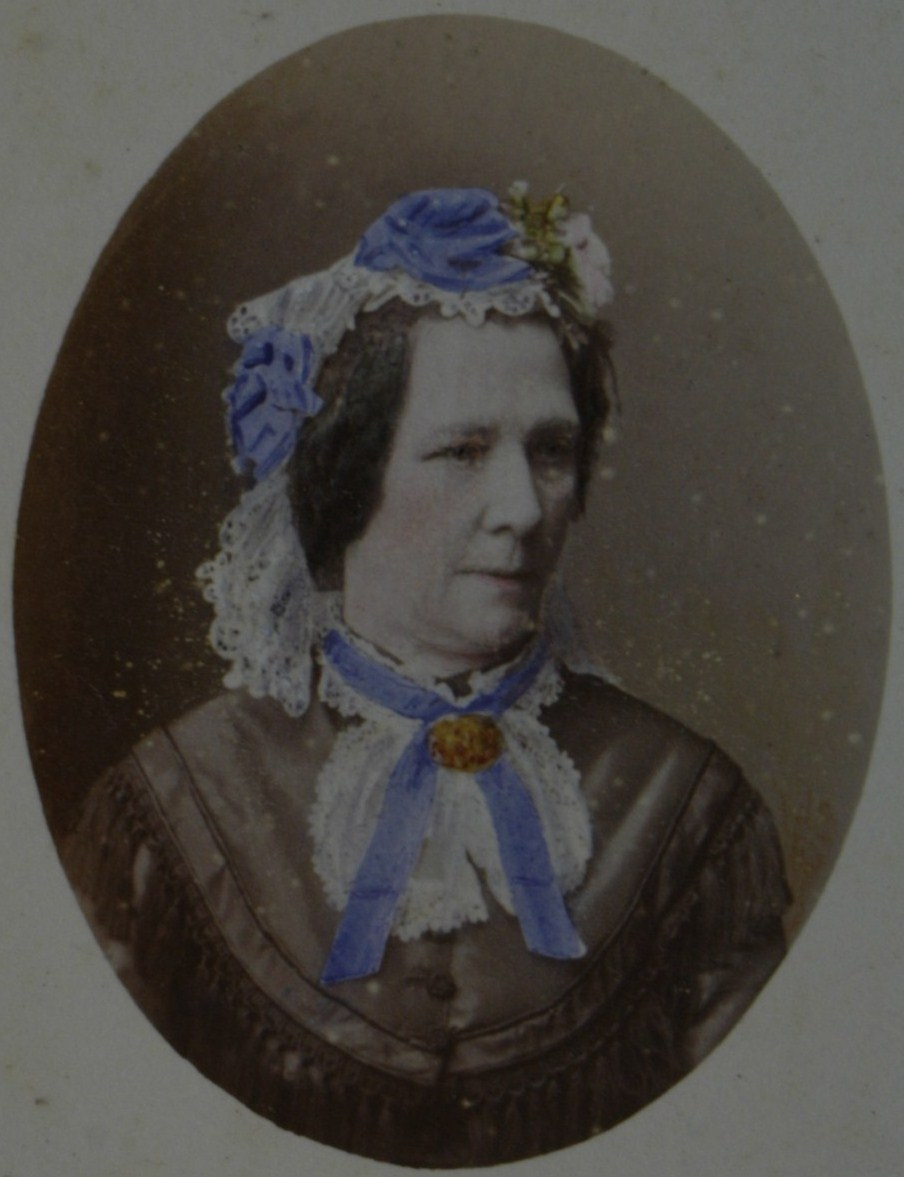
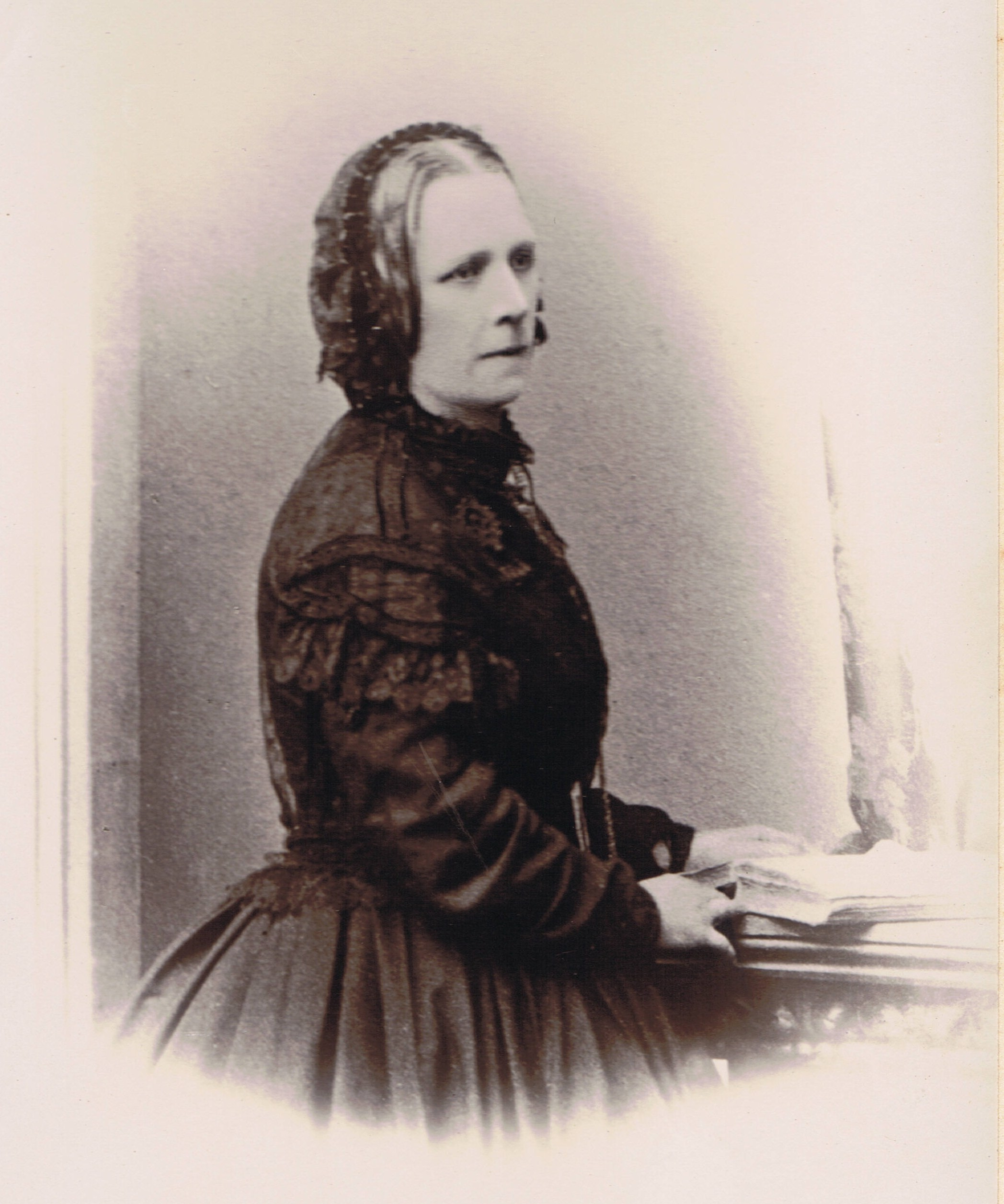
_{Mrs Leopold Fane De Salis.}

Leopold de Salis was elected the Local Member for Queanbeyan in the New South Wales Legislative Assembly where he served local constituents from 1864–69. Then in July 1874 he was appointed to the New South Wales Legislative Council. In a political career spanning 24 years, De Salis pursued taxation reform, specifically income tax, that required labourers contribute 'as an insurance against misfortune or improvidence'.

The De Salis family later fell victim to the financial crisis of the 1890s and the Union Bank of Australia foreclosed on the family's Queensland land holdings in 1892. Leopold visited England in 1893, when the accompanying photograph was taken. The De Salis family remained at Cuppacumbalong until 1894. Leopold was declared insolvent four years later with a debt of £100,000 shortly before his death.

De Salis Street located in the Canberra suburb of Weetangera is named in honour of Leopold de Salis.

== Various owners ==
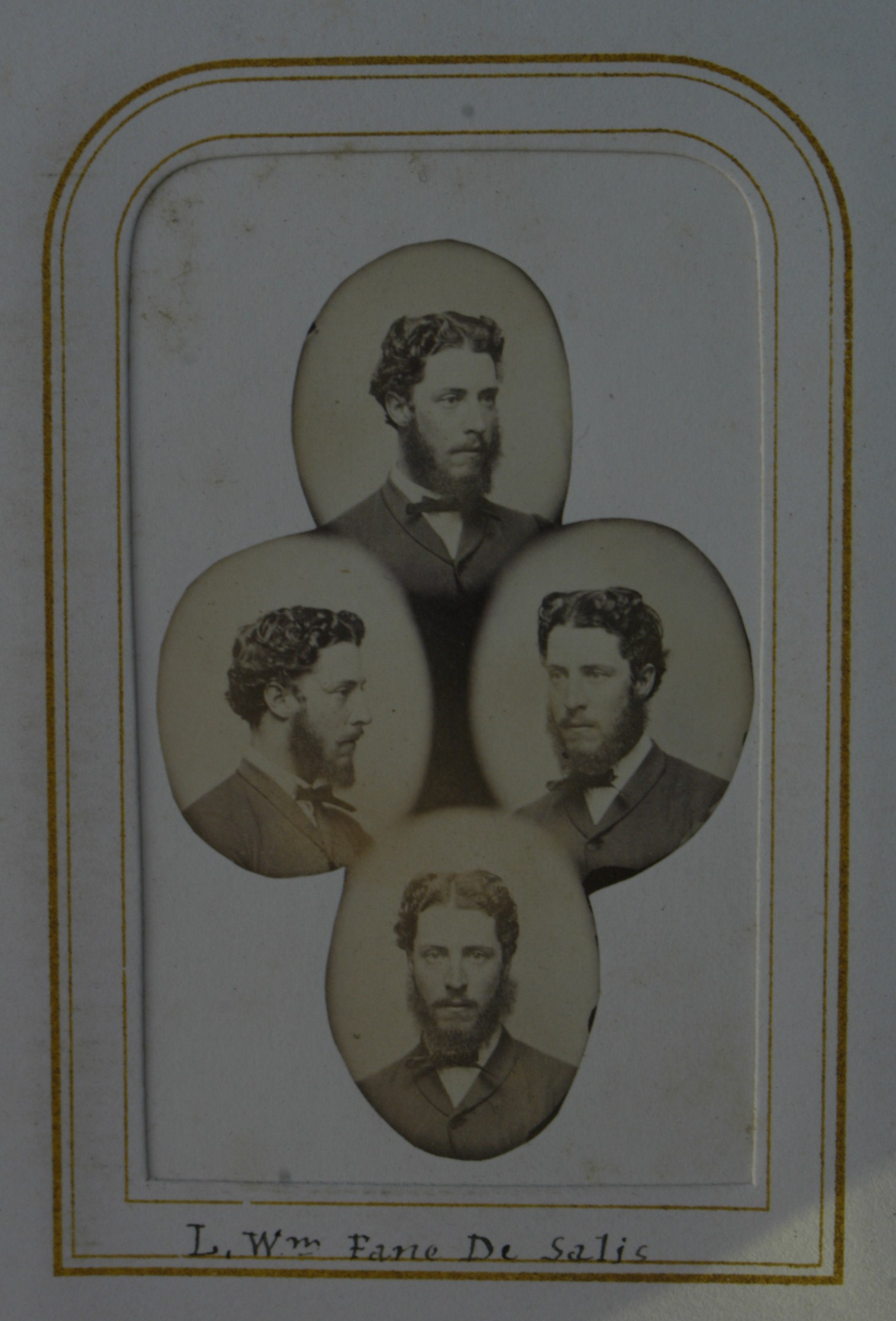
One of the De Salis Bros., Leopold William Jerome Fane de Salis (1845-1930).

Cuppacumbalong passed through the hands of two sets of owners during the first two decades of the 20th century. Fred Campbell and Colonel Selwyn Campbell were in partnership with George Circuitt who was married to a daughter of Mr Crace of Gungahleen of the Ginninderra district. Campbell and co lived there for 13 years until August 1911, having sold the 20,939-acre (84.74 km^{2}) estate to A.G. McKeahnie of Queanbeyan. A new owner Alan Thomson acquired the property after this time. Thomson built a new homestead at a point high above the Murrumbidgee River flood plain overlooking the old homestead which he later demolished .

== Snow family ==
Frank Snow who originated from Ballarat in central Victoria acquired Cuppacumbalong in the early 1920s. He completed extensive additions to the Thomson homestead. This modern bungalow offered beautiful views of the surrounding country side from the terraces where frilly petunias cascaded over the walls and brightly coloured parrots amongst the hawthorns and the giant arbutus.

The Snow family played host to a number of international guests most notably the then UK Opposition Leader and future Prime Minister Anthony Eden and later still Princess Elizabeth and Prince Philip, Duke of Edinburgh during their 1952 Australian Royal tour.

The Snow family continued with the wool tradition running about 7,000 head of Merino sheep and 300 head of Hereford cattle. In addition they operated a small Romney Marsh sheep stud. At 7,700 acres (31 km^{2}) in size Cuppacumbalong was one of the largest remaining freehold rural properties in the late 1960s.

== Commercial uses ==
In the early to mid-1970s the Federal Governments under Prime Ministers William McMahon and Gough Whitlam withdrew the rural leases for Lanyon, Cuppacumbalong Homestead and Gold Creek Homestead. In 1975, Karen O’Clery leased Cuppacumbalong Homestead from the Department of the Capital Territory and established the Cuppacumbalong Craft Centre, with a cafe, exhibition rooms, two permanent studios (later extended to three). Later still a shop was opened displaying studio output and other craft work.

With a change of lease in 1999, the Cuppacumbalong Homestead became a restaurant and wedding reception centre. A separate cottage gallery continued to exhibit and sell Australian craftwork. Then one year after the disastrous 2003 Canberra bush fires, business was dealt a fatal blow. The Tharwa Bridge was closed, both Cuppacumbalong businesses suspended operations. In 2007, the current lessees planned to convert the homestead to a private residence and to build a separate gallery and bakery cafe. By 2016, the bridge had reopened and the buildings were available for short-term rent to tourists.

== Heritage site ==
All three Cuppacumbalong homesteads, including the ones constructed by James Wright, the de Salis and Snow families are included on the Australian Capital Territory Heritage Register.

The citation of the Heritage Register states that:

the remains of the first (Wright) homestead and the second (De Salis) homestead are important archaeological sites associated with the first settlement of the area. The current homestead which dates from 1923 is a good, relatively rare and reasonably intact example of the Inter-War California Bungalow style in the ACT. It is one of only a few known examples of this style in the ACT.

The de Salis family grave is also sited at Cuppacumbalong and about 16 people associated with to the de Salis family including the count, his wife, their second son and station staff are buried there.

The de Salis family planted stands of Lombardy poplars alongside the riverfront at Tharwa.
