= Helen Alma Newton Turner =

Australian geneticist (1908–1995)

Helen A. Newton Turner AO, OBE
- Newton Turner in 1973
- Born: 15 May 1908; Sydney, New South Wales, Australia
- Died: 26 November 1995 (aged 87); Chatswood, Sydney
- Education: University of Sydney
- Known for: Research into sheep genetics
- Awards: Farrer Memorial Medal
- Scientific career
- Fields: Genetics, statistics
- Workplaces: Commonwealth Scientific and Industrial Research Organisation

Helen Alma Newton Turner AO OBE (15 May 1908 – 26 November 1995) was an Australian geneticist and statistician. She was a leading authority on sheep genetics and worked at the Commonwealth Scientific and Industrial Research Organisation (CSIRO) for 40 years.

== Biography ==
Helen Alma Newton Turner was born in Sydney, New South Wales, Australia on 15 May 1908. She received her BArch in 1930, graduating with honors from the University of Sydney. She worked briefly in an architect's office before taking a position as Ian Clunies Ross' secretary at the McMaster Animal Health Laboratory of the Council for Scientific and Industrial Research in 1931. She developed an interest in statistics and Ross arranged for her to train in the United Kingdom with statisticians Frank Yates and Ronald Fisher. She returned to CSIRO in 1939 as a consulting statistician to the agency's Division of Animal Health and Production. Newton Turner formed the University Women's Land Army with marine biologist Isobel Bennett in 1940. She was a statistician for the Department of Home Security in Canberra in 1942 and for the Department of Manpower in Sydney from 1943 to 1944. She worked as a statistician until about 1945 and in 1946 became a technical officer at the Division of Animal Health and Production.

In 1956, Newton Turner was made senior principal research scientist of CSIRO's Division of Animal Genetics and led sheep breeding research. She received her DSc from the University of Sydney in 1970 and continued at the Division of Animal Genetics in 1976. Newton Turner introduced objective, measurement-based approaches to sheep breeding and utilised quantitative genetics to improve wool quality and output from Merino sheep. From the late 1960s until the late 1980s, she travelled, assessing sheep development programs around the world.

The Association for the Advancement of Animal Breeding and Genetics established the Helen Newton Turner Medal in 1993. She died on 26 November 1995 in Sydney.

== Awards ==
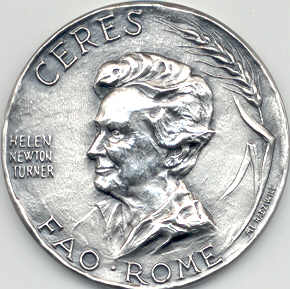
FAO CERES2 Turner Silver Obverse

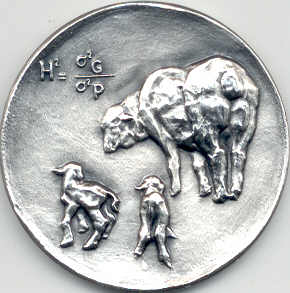
FAO CERES2 Turner Silver Reverse

- 1953 – Queen Elizabeth II Coronation Medal
- 1974 – Farrer Memorial Medal
- 1977 – Officer of the Order of the British Empire (OBE)
- 1980 – FAO Ceres Medal
- 1985 – Rotary Medal for Vocational Excellence
- 1987 – Officer of the Order of Australia (AO)

== Further reading and listening ==
- Allen, Nessy (June 1992). "Helen Newton Turner and the wool industry". Journal of Australian Studies. 16 (33): 56–62. doi:10.1080/14443059209387099.
- "Pioneering Women – Helen Newton Turner". The Random Sample (Podcast). Australian Data Science Network. 2018.
