= Lambrigg, Tharwa =

Historical property in the Australian Capital Territory

Coordinates: 35.4590°S 149.0536°E

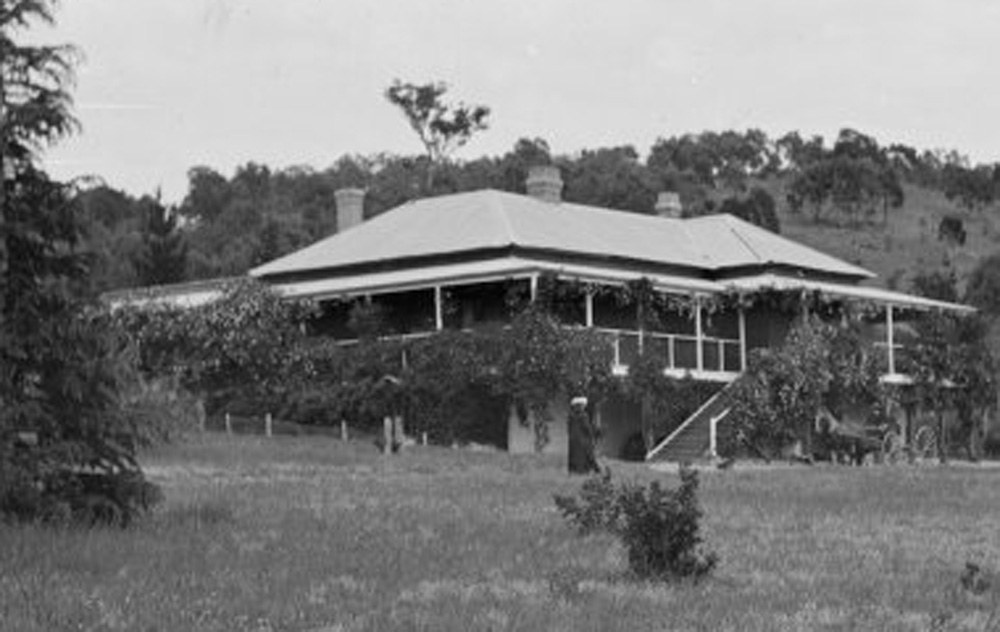
Lambrigg, Tharwa, Australian Capital Territory, circa 1900.

Lambrigg is an historical property close to Tharwa in the Australian Capital Territory which is listed by the ACT Heritage Council as a place of historical significance. It was the residence of William James Farrer who made a major contribution to the wheat industry by developing a strain of wheat that was resistant to wheat rust. Lambrigg was the site where Farrer conducted his work on genetic selection for his wheat varieties.

== William and Nina Farrer ==
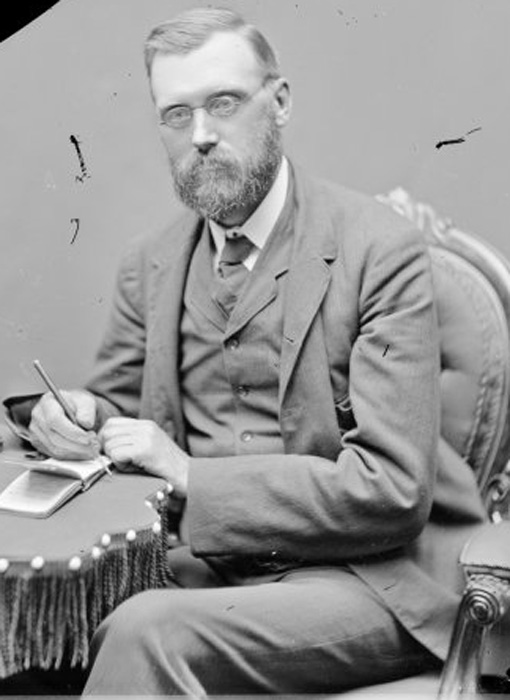
William James Farrer, circa 1890.

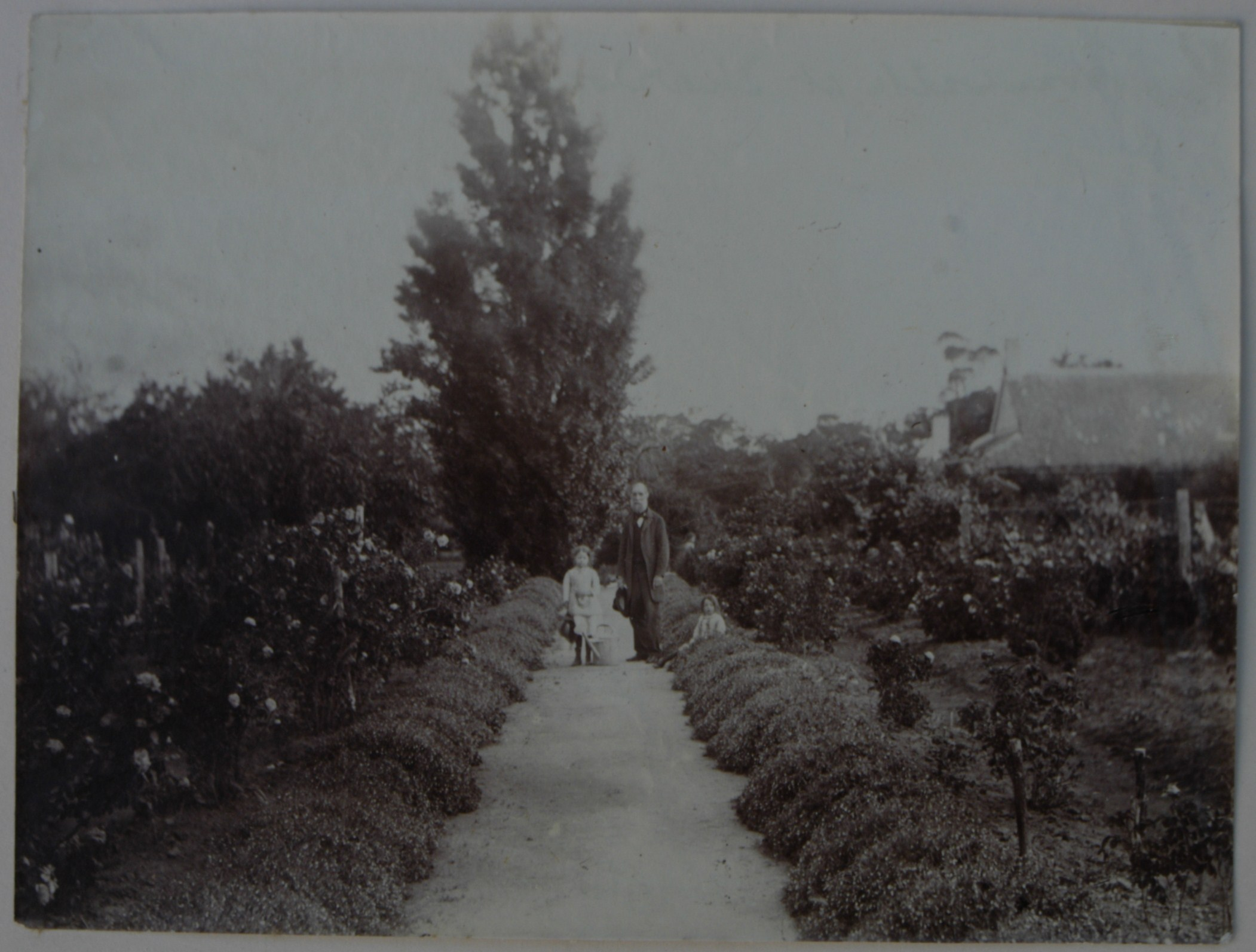
Nina Farrer's father, Leopold Fane De Salis (1816-98), in an Australian garden, possibly Cuppacumbalong.

William Farrer was born in 1845 in Westmorland England. His parents, who were farmers, were Thomas Farrer and Sarah Brunskill. He was academically very advanced and won scholarships and medals which took him eventually to Cambridge University where he obtained his Bachelor of Arts Degree in 1868. Soon after he contracted tuberculosis and, for health reasons, migrated to Australia in 1870 at the age of 25.

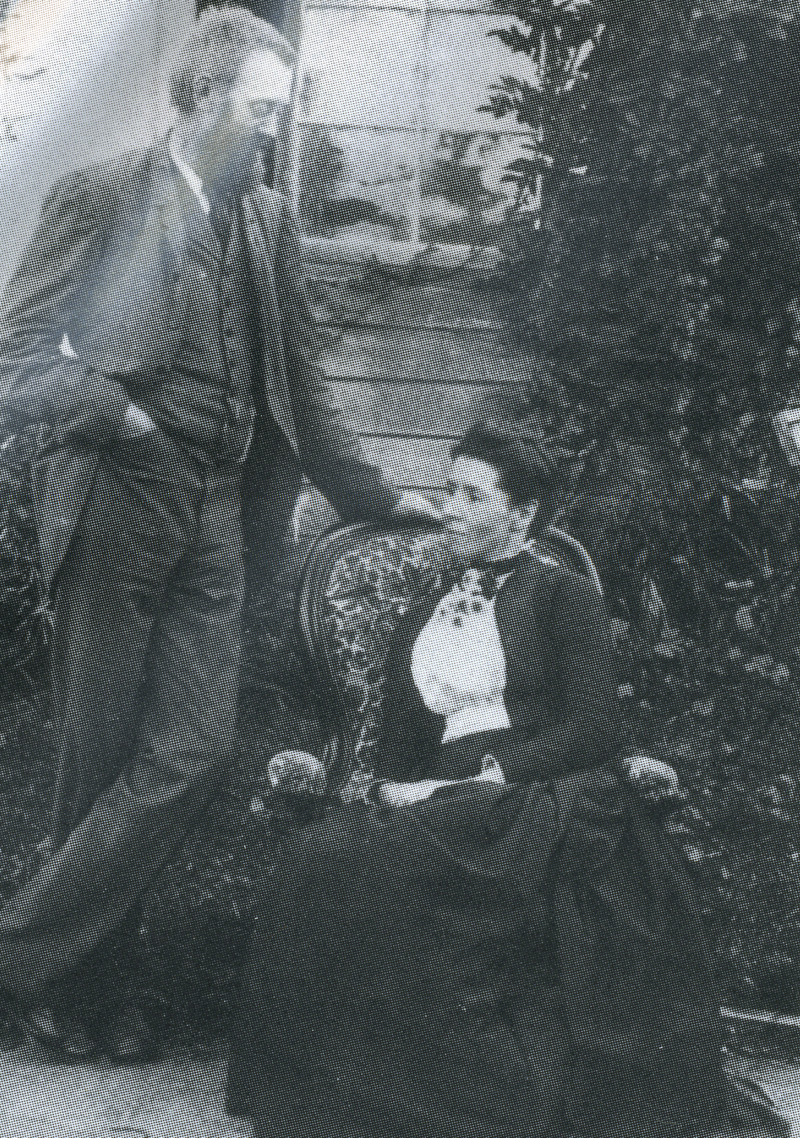
William and Nina Farrer circa 1880

Not long after he arrived, he became a tutor at Duntroon in Canberra. He intended to buy a sheep station but because of financial problems he was unable to do this. He qualified as a surveyor in 1875 and for the next eleven years worked with the New South Wales Department of Lands.

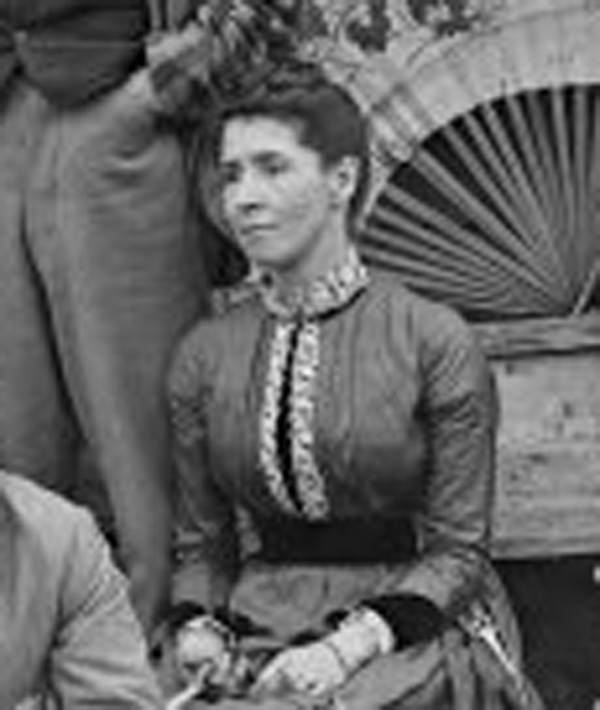
Nina Farrer circa 1890

In 1882 he married Nina De Salis at St Philip’s Anglican Church in Sydney. Nina was the daughter of Leopold Fane De Salis and Charlotte Macdonald. She was born in 1848 and when she met William she was living on one of her father’s properties near Canberra called Cuppacumbalong. As a wedding present, Nina’s father, Leopold, gave her some land close to Cuppacumbalong. William Farrer called the property Lambrigg which was the name of the English village where his ancestors lived.

The Farrers did not live at Lambrigg after their marriage but remained at Cuppacumbalong. Lambrigg, which was only a short ride from Cuppacumbalong, was established as a domestic farm by William Farrer. Charlotte De Salis, his niece, describes how he erected a large orchard at the southern end of the property, a vineyard that ran next to it along the Murrumbidgee River and a large dam. He also planted a rose garden and some weeping willows near the river. There were also horses and sheep, cattle, goats, pigs, turkeys and fowls which came under Nina’s special care. At about this time Farrer began to plant his wheat for experimental purposes.

The first building at Lambrigg was a homestead erected mainly for the farm worker and his family to live in. This was a six-room house built of pise (mud). One room and a bedroom was reserved for William should he need to stay overnight. This building has been demolished and only the footings remain. However, there is a photo taken by the De Salis family in about 1900 which shows the homestead. (see photo below).

The building of the main Lambrigg Homestead did not commence until after 1890 and was completed by 1894. Farrer decided that the setting of the house was to be facing the river and the north with the view from the front balcony being the winding Murrumbidgee and the surrounding blue hills. His laboratory for his wheat experiments which still stands today was built in 1898. It is a three roomed building made of pise with flagstone floors. It contains a small bedroom which was for Farrer’s laboratory assistant. A photo of this building was taken by the De Salis family shortly after it was built (see at bottom of page).

The financial depression that struck rural Australia in 1890 ruined the De Salis family and they lost all their properties and were forced to sell Cuppacumbalong in 1894. George and Henry De Salis, Nina's brothers, were working on the properties and were severely affected. Lambrigg had been gifted to Nina and therefore was not affected by the De Salis foreclosure. After the completion of Lambrigg in 1894 all the families moved there. At this time there was William and Nina, Leopold De Salis, George and Mary De Salis and their seven children and Henry and Charlotte De Salis and their five children lived there. A photo of the adult residents is shown below.

William Farrer continued with his wheat research work using his own resources until 1898 when he was employed by the Department of Agriculture as a wheat experimentalist. He developed strains of wheat which were disease-resistant and substantially improved the wheat industry. He died at Lambrigg of heart disease in 1906 and was buried on the property (see photo of his grave after his burial at bottom of page). Nina continued living at Lambrigg until her death in 1929 and was buried next to William. In 1939 a memorial was erected in honour of the Farrers and both their graves were included in the memorial enclosure (see photo at bottom of page).

After Nina's death the McMurtrie family bought Lambrigg Homestead and lived there until 1941. The Merrivale family obtained the house after them and lived there for eight years.

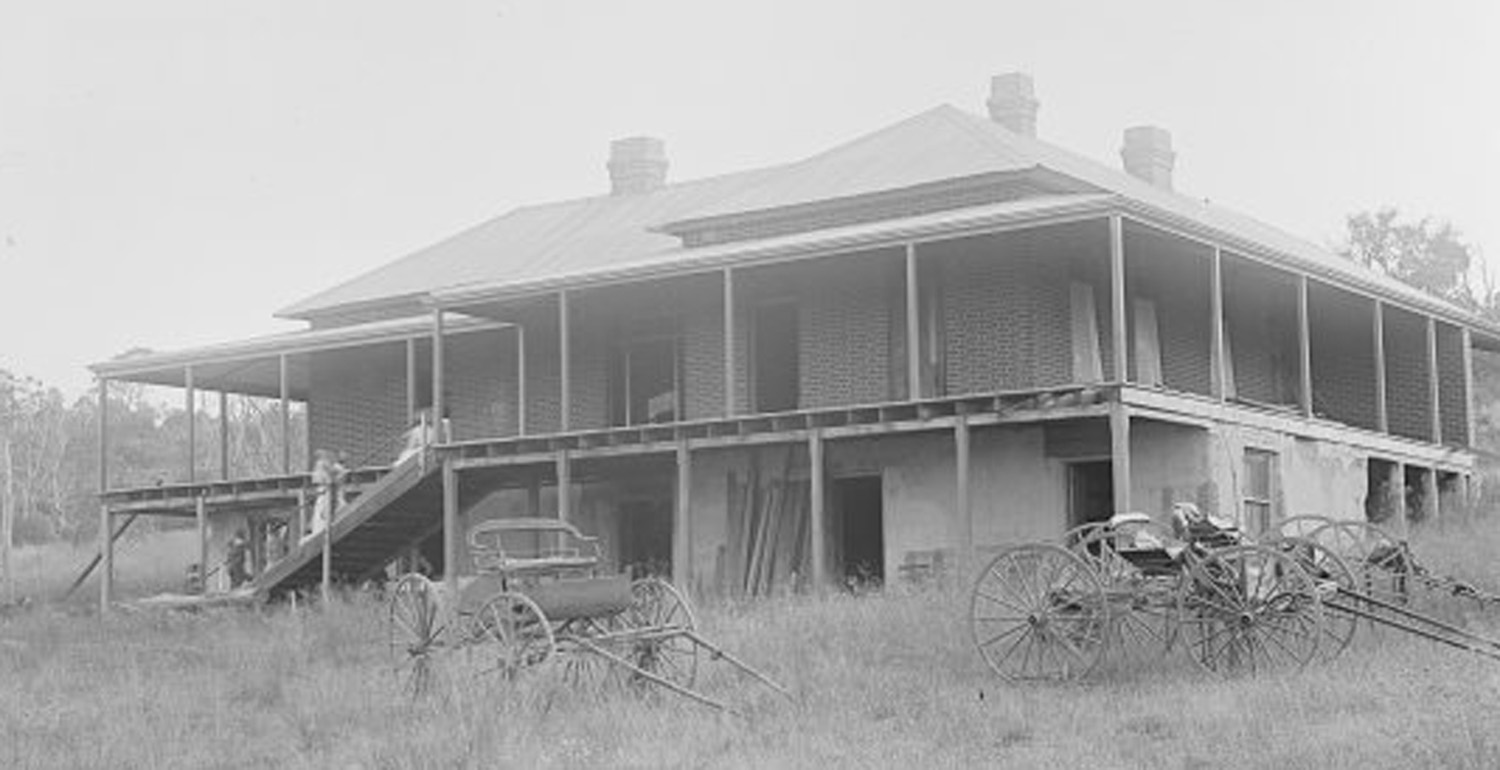
Present Homestead under construction at Lambrigg in 1894. The verandah is incomplete and the railings have not been built.

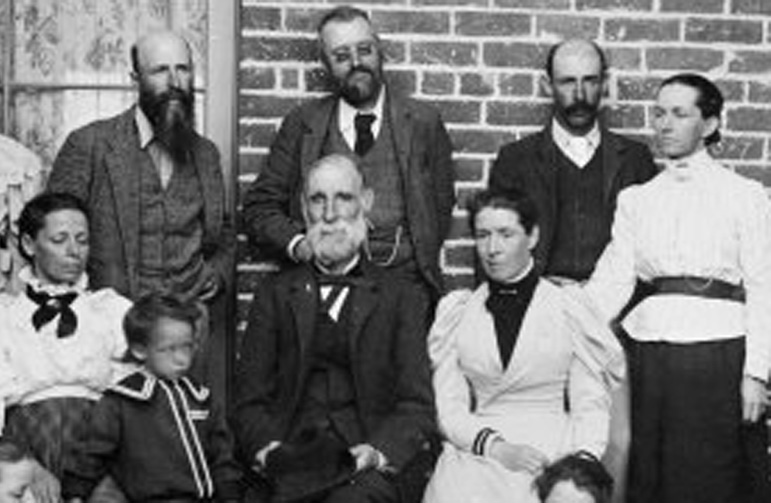
The residents of Lambrigg from 1894. Top row - George De Salis, William Farrer, Henry De Salis, Charlotte De Salis (Henry's wife). Bottom row - Mary De Salis (George's wife), Leopold De Salis, Nina Farrer.

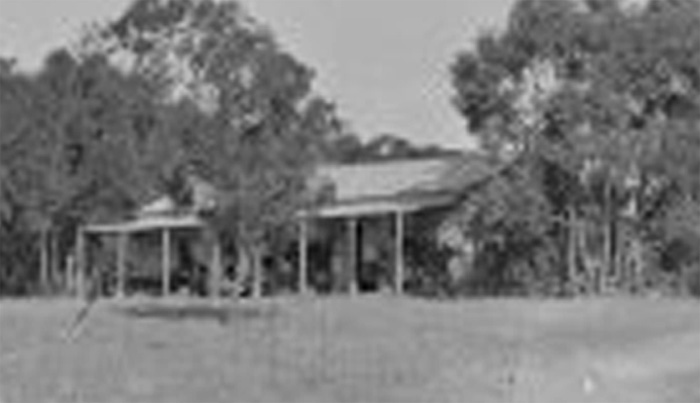
Photo of the old homestead at Lambrigg taken by the De Salis family circa 1900.

== Jo and Ruth Gullett ==
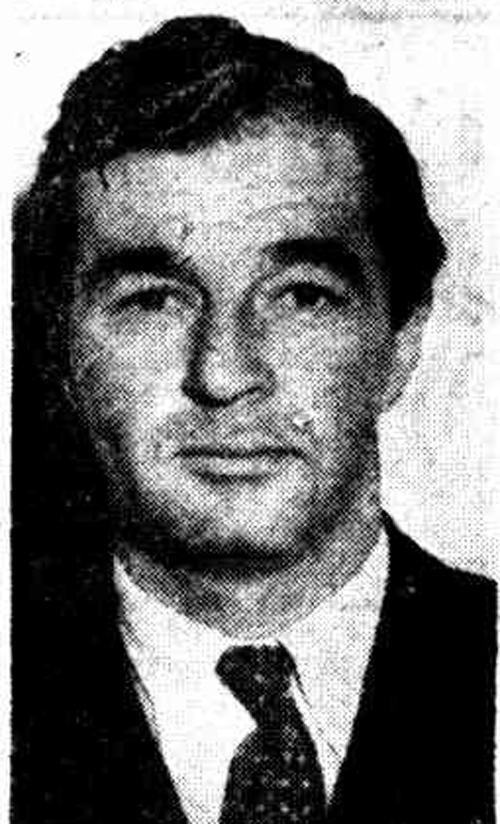
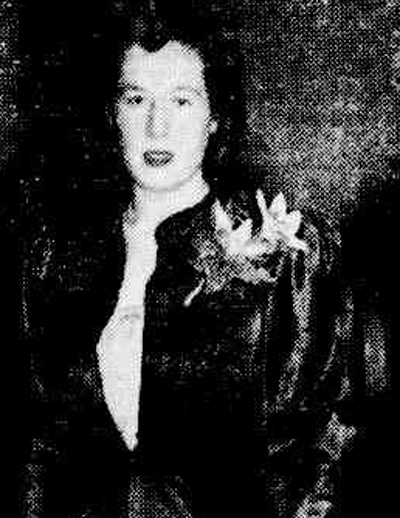
Jo and Ruth Gullett who owned Lambrigg for forty years and developed the garden, 1946

Henry Baynton 'Jo' Gullett was born in 1914. He was the son of Sir Henry Somer Gullett (1878-1940) and Elizabeth Penelope Frater. He spent most of his childhood in Melbourne and at the age of 18 in 1932 went to Oxford University where he obtained his Bachelor of Arts Degree. When he returned to Melbourne three years later he was employed as a journalist.

In 1939 at the outbreak of World War II, he enlisted in the armed forces and served in the Middle East, Greece and New Guinea and was in a battalion that invaded Normandy on D Day. In 1943 he was awarded the Military Cross. An account of his war experiences is given in his book called "Not as a Duty Only".

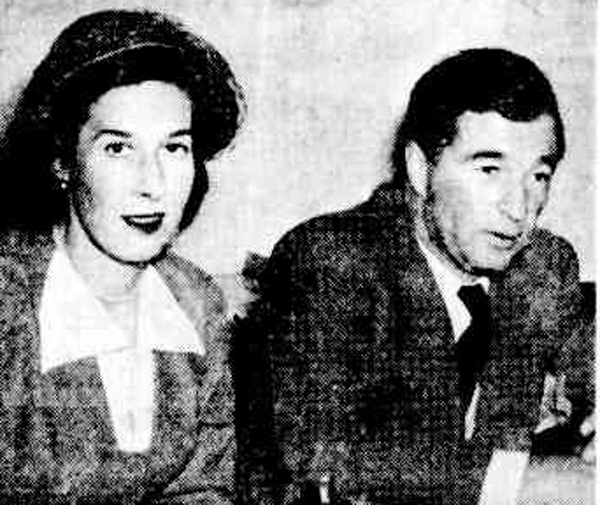
Ruth and Jo Gullett, 1953

In 1946 he married Ruth Mary Colman who was the daughter of Sir George Stanley Colman and Marion Dalrymple. At this time Jo was the Federal Member for Henty a seat which he had won the previous year. During his parliamentary career he was a member of the Standing Committee for Public Works and from 1950 to 1956 was the Government Whip. He resigned from Parliament in 1956 but in 1965 he was appointed as Ambassador to Greece for three years.

In 1949 Jo and Ruth bought Lambrigg. Both of them had a particular interest in gardening but when they came to Lambrigg there was very little of the Farrer's garden remaining because of neglect. However, there were still some almond trees, radiata pines, elms, poplars, a cedar, a hedge, some climbing roses, a flowering apricot and some daffodils The couple developed the garden over the next forty years and it is now one of the showpiece gardens in Canberra. Ruth was also interested in historic houses and was for some years President of the National Trust. She was awarded an MBE in 1982 for her services to the National Estate.

== Lambrigg today ==
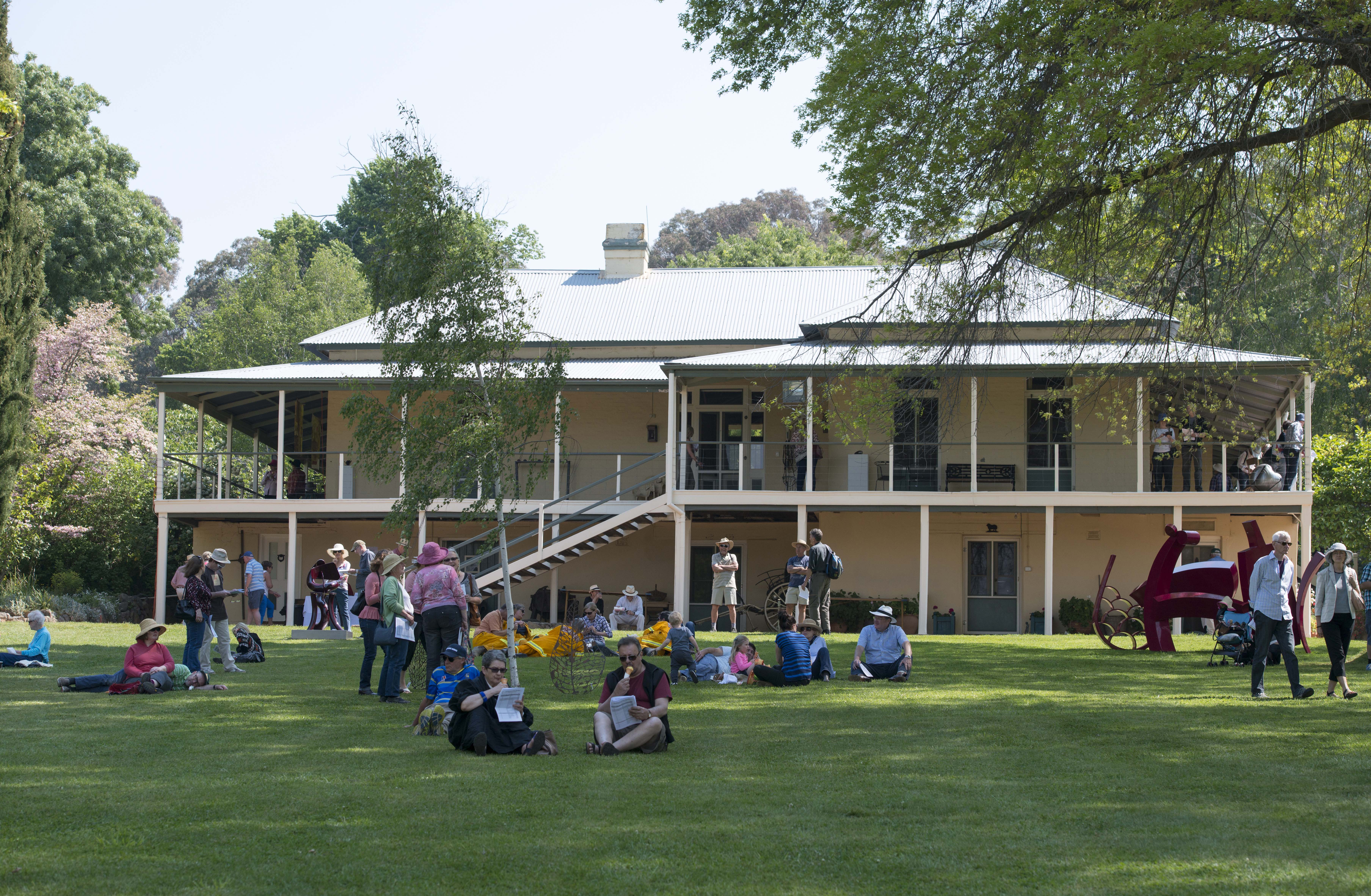
Lambrigg today.

Today Lambrigg is in the Open Garden Scheme and is open to the public occasionally
