= James Arthur Prescott =

Australian scientist (1890–1987)

James Arthur Prescott CBE FRS (7 October 1890 – 6 February 1987) was an agricultural scientist.

== Early life and education ==
James Arthur Prescott was born on 7 October 1890 at Bolton, Lancashire, England, the first of seven children of Joseph Arthur Prescott and his wife, Mary Alice, née Garsden.

Prescott was educated at the University of Manchester, achieving Bachelor of Science with First Class Honours in 1911. The following year he was awarded the first postgraduate scholarship in agricultural science taken at Rothamsted Experimental Station at Harpenden.

== Career ==
Prescott worked as an agricultural scientist.

From 1916 to 1924, Prescott worked for Sultanic Agricultural Society of Egypt. There he produced 13 scientific papers, including four on the study of nitrogen in the soil, and alkalinity of Egyptian soils.

In 1919 he was awarded a Master of Science by the University of Manchester based on a thesis of his phosphate studies while at Rothamsted.

From 1924 until his death Prescott worked in Australia, initially as chair of agricultural chemistry at the University of Adelaide. He published in CSIR bulletin 52 "The Soils of Australia in Relation to Vegetation and Climate". This paper was the basis of his submission to the University of Adelaide, for which he was awarded the degree of Doctor of Science in 1932.

Prescott produced "Atmospheric Saturation Deficit in Australia" in 1931, and with H.G. Poole, "The relationships between Sticky Point, Moisture Equivalent and Mechanical Analysis in some Australian Soils" in 1934.

== Other roles ==
Prescott was chairman of the CSIR Oenological Research Committee from 1938 to 1955, and a member of the Council of the Australian Wine Research Institute 1955 to 1970.

== Honours ==
In 1925 Prescott was elected a Fellow of the Royal Society (FRS).

In 1954 he became a foundation fellow of the Australian Academy of Science.

Other honours and awards included:

- 1931 H. G. Smith Memorial Award of the Royal Australian Chemical Institute
- 1938 Verco Medal of the Royal Society of South Australia
- 1947 Companion of the Order of the British Empire
- 1948 John Lewis Medal of the Royal Geographical Society of South Australia
- 1948 Farrer Medal of the Farrer Memorial Trust of New South Wales
- 1950 Australian Medal of Agricultural Science of the Australian Institute of Agricultural Science
- 1954 Mueller Medal of the Australian and New Zealand Association for the Advancement of Science
- 1956 Honorary degree of Doctor of Agricultural Science, University of Melbourne

The Australian Society of Soil Science established the J.A. Prescott Medal in 1971 to be awarded for outstanding contributions to soil science and climatology.

In 1980 the Waite Institute and the CSIRO Division of Soils held a two-day symposium in his honour, on his 90th birthday.
