= Ian Reay Mackay =

Australian immunologist (1922–2020)

- Born: 22 March 1922
- Died: 24 March 2020 (aged 98)
- Known for: autoimmune diseases
- Scientific career
- Fields: immunology

Ian Mackay AM FAA (22 March 1922 – 24 March 2020) was an Australian immunologist. He is noted for his work on autoimmune diseases and is considered to have made major contributions to this field. Mackay was a professor at Monash University and wrote a new edition of his textbook on autoimmune disease. His book Intolerant Bodies: A Short History of Autoimmunity (written with Warwick Anderson) won the General History Prize, New South Wales Premier's History Awards 2015.

Mackay was appointed a Member of the Order of Australia in the 1981 Australia Day Honours for service to medical research. He was elected a Fellow of the Australian Academy of Science in 1991.
