= Eric Underwood =

Australian scientist

Eric John Underwood AO, CBE (7 September 1905 – 19 August 1980) was an Australian scientist who pioneered research into sheep nutrition and wool production.

== Personal life ==
Underwood was born in Harlington, Middlesex, England on 7 September 1905, the youngest of three children to James and Elizabeth Underwood. When Elizabeth died in 1907, Underwood and his siblings were placed in the care of family while James migrated to Western Australia and established himself at Mount Barker. After a long period of correspondence James convinced a friend Kate Taysom to accompany the children to Fremantle in 1913. James and Kate were married the day after their arrival.

On 23 June 1934 Eric Underwood married school teacher Erica Chandler at St Andrews Church, Perth, and they had two daughters and two sons. Underwood died in Royal Perth Hospital on 19 August 1980.

== Education ==
The family stayed in Mount Barker until 1920 when James took up a 1,850 acres (7.5 km^{2}) property near Coorow in Western Australia's Mid West region. Underwood boarded in Perth for schooling, going to North Perth State and Perth Modern School, and returning to the Coorow property during school holidays. In 1924 Underwood commenced a cadetship with the Department of Agriculture and studied Agriculture at The University of Western Australia, gaining his bachelor of science in 1928, which he graduated with honours. His thesis, A botanical and chemical study of Western Australian pastures, was published in 1929. Underwood the took up the Hackett research studentship to study at Gonville and Caius College, Cambridge obtaining his Doctorate of Science in 1931 and returning to Western Australia.

In June 1936 Underwood undertook a two-year fellowship funded by the Commonwealth at the University of Wisconsin–Madison. When he returned to Western Australia, he was invited to work with The University of Western Australia's Institute of Agriculture.

== Research ==
On his return to Western Australia, Underwood returned to the Department of Agriculture. In 1933 he was appointed Animal Nutrition Officer. One of the first research studies he undertook was on Denmark wasting disease in sheep, as there was speculation that the disease was caused by iron deficiency. At the same time Hedley Marston was researching the disease in South Australia, and in January 1935, Marston published his findings concluding that the cause was a deficiency in the trace element cobalt, Underwood published his findings in March 1935 with similar conclusions. Years later the findings were confirmed with cobalt-containing Vitamin B12 shown as the key to the disease and the factor in haematopoiesis. Nowadays sheep receive B12 supplements in the poor-pasture areas of the south coastal strip to manage cobalt and selenium deficiencies.

Underwood's next research project was the beginning of a 30-year association with Avondale Agricultural Research Station, this study was into the effect of sulfur on wool growth. This was followed investigations with botulism in sheep, results of which were published in the Journal of Agriculture. During the 1940s he studied the nutritional value of hay and pasture for sheep, the ongoing results from these Studies in Cereal Hay production in Western Australia were published in the Journal of Agriculture.

== Teaching ==
In 1946 Underwood was appointed Dean of faculty and director of The University of Western Australia's Institute of Agriculture. Under Underwood, the Institute's teaching and research activities outstripped available resources, and he obtained support from CSIRO's Wool research fund. Underwood also presented a paper New Deal for Agriculture which secured additional funding from the University administration. This funding enabled additional staffing, and an increase in postgraduate studies. As a lecturer, Underwood's logical presentation made the most complex information easy to understand.

== Other activities ==
In 1940, Underwood published the review Nutrition Abstracts and Reviews which was later expanded and published as the book Trace Elements in Human and Animal Nutrition. He revised and republished the book in 1962, 1971 and 1977. In 1966, he also published the book The Mineral Nutrition of Livestock. From 1946 to 1959, Underwood was chairman of Tuberculosis Association of Western Australia, and from 1956-1958 he was also federal president of National Association for the Prevention of Tuberculosis. Underwood joined the executive of CSIRO in 1966, writing many papers and giving lectures. Retiring from The University of Western Australia in 1970, Underwood continued on the executive of CSIRO until 1975.

== Recognition ==
- 1954 Fellow of Australian Academy of Science
- 1958 Fellow of Australian Institute of Agricultural Science
- 1962 Underwood Avenue, Shenton Park, Western Australia was named in his honor.
- 1963 Commander of the Order of the British Empire
- 1967 awarded the Farrer Medal
- 1967 Honorary Degree Rural Science from University of New England
- 1969 Honorary Degree Science (Agriculture) University of Western Australia
- 1970 Fellow of Australian Society of Animal Production
- 1973 Macfarlane Burnet Medal and Lecture of the Australian Academy of Science
- 1976 Officer of the Order of Australia
- 1980 Honorary Degree Science from the University of Wisconsin
