= Graeme Hammer =

Australian crop scientist

- Citizenship: Australian
- Education: University of Melbourne; University of Queensland; Kansas State University
- Scientific career
- Fields: Crop science; crop modelling
- Institutions: The University of Queensland

Graeme Hammer is an Australian crop scientist and distinguished professor at the Queensland Alliance for Agriculture and Food Innovation (QAAFI) at the University of Queensland (UQ). His research has focused on crop physiology and modelling, climate risk applications in agriculture, and systems approaches to plant breeding. He has held leadership roles in establishing research centres and collaborative initiatives in Australia.

== Early life and education ==
Hammer earned a Bachelor of Science in Forestry (Honours) from the University of Melbourne in 1973, a Bachelor of Arts in mathematics and statistics from the University of Queensland in 1978, and a Master of Science in forest growth and modelling from the University of Melbourne in 1983. He completed a PhD in crop physiology and modelling at Kansas State University in 1987.

== Career ==
Hammer's early career included roles as a Forestry Officer with the Northern Territory Forest Service (1973–1976) and Lecturer in Plant Ecology at the Queensland Institute of Technology (1976–1977). He then joined the Queensland Department of Primary Industries (QDPI), serving as Research Scientist and Senior Research Scientist (1977–1992), Principal Research Scientist (1993–1997) and Senior Principal Research Scientist (1997–2001).

He joined UQ in 2001 as Professor in Crop Science (School of Land, Crop and Food Sciences) and was involved in the establishment of QAAFI as a research institute at UQ with engagement with QDPI. He became Professor and Director of the Centre for Plant Science in QAAFI (2011–2018), and from 2018 has been Professor in Crop Science in the Centre for Crop Science (CCS), QAAFI. Following the growth of the Centre for Plant Science, he led its division into the Centres for Crop Science and Horticultural Science in 2018 and remained CCS Director until February 2019.

Hammer was instrumental in establishing and leading the Agricultural Production Systems Research Unit (APSRU), a joint venture of CSIRO, the Queensland Government and UQ, and co-led development of the Agricultural Production Systems Simulator (APSIM).

== Research and contributions ==
Hammer's research has addressed soil–crop–management–environment interactions and the development of predictive system models for crop improvement and management. He contributed to the development of crop modelling in Australia in the early 1980s and has applied simulation models with growers and agribusiness to inform decision-making.

His work on crop adaptation and climate risks linked seasonal climate prediction, particularly based on the El Niño–Southern Oscillation to crop simulation to explore risk management strategies. He edited the volume Applications of Seasonal Climate Forecasting in Agricultural and Natural Ecosystems – The Australian Experience (Kluwer, 2000).

Hammer has also worked on integrated systems approaches to plant breeding, using models to characterise environments, analyse physiological bases of trait variation, and examine genotype–management–environment interactions. He co-edited Plant Adaptation and Crop Improvement (CAB International, 1996), collaborated with public sorghum breeding in Australia and with Pioneer Hi-Bred's maize program in the United States, and has held Chief Investigator roles in Australian Research Council (ARC) Centres of Excellence.

== Publications ==
Hammer has published over 230 refereed journal articles, more than 20 book chapters, and over 130 major conference papers, and has served as lead editor of two books and on editorial boards of scientific journals. His work has an h-index of 106.

=== Selected works ===
- Plant Adaptation and Crop Improvement (co-editor). CAB International, 1996.
- Applications of Seasonal Climate Forecasting in Agricultural and Natural Ecosystems – The Australian Experience (editor). Kluwer Academic, 2000.
- Hammer, G. et al. (2009). Crop Science 49: 299–312. (Thomson ISI Fast Breaking Paper award).
- ORCID: 0000-0002-1180-7374

== Grants and leadership ==
Hammer has been Chief or Partner Investigator on projects funded by agencies including the Australian Research Council, Grains Research and Development Corporation, the Bill & Melinda Gates Foundation, and the Australian Centre for International Agricultural Research, supporting multidisciplinary teams across UQ and the Queensland Department of Agriculture and Fisheries; external funding has typically exceeded A$1 million per annum.

He has chaired and served on committees and advisory boards, including leadership roles for the InterDrought conference series, the APSIM Initiative Steering Committee (UQ Research Leader), and the International Research Institute for Climate and Society Scientific Advisory Committee (2000–2010).

== Honours and awards ==
- Farrer Memorial Medal (2012)
- Australian Medal for Agricultural Science, Ag Institute Australia (2012)
- Soil Science Society of America – Agricultural Systems Modelling Award (2012)
- Thomson ISI Highly Cited Researcher in agricultural science (2006–2014; 2018)
- Queensland Primary Industries Research Achievement Award (2002)
