= William Farrer =

Australian agronomist (1845–1906)

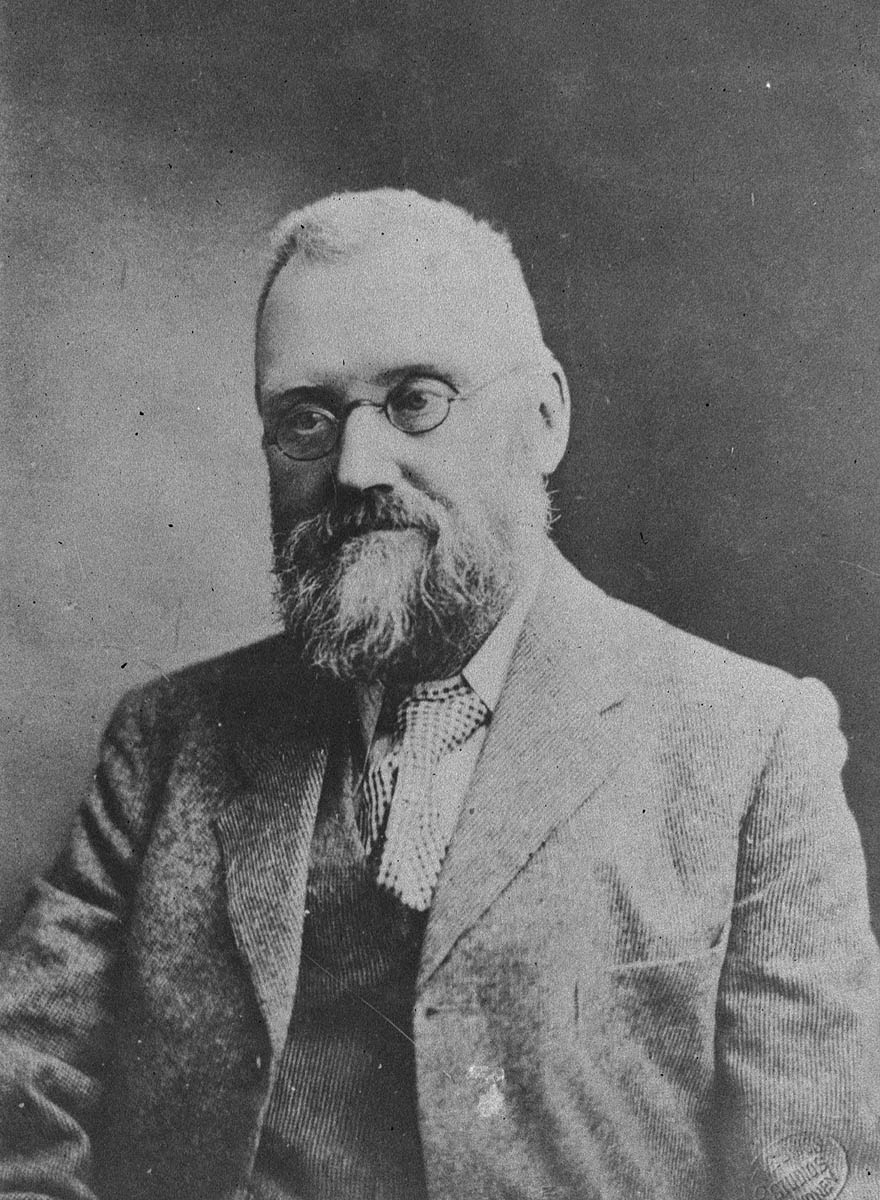
- Born: William James Farrer; 3 April 1845; Docker, Westmorland, England
- Died: 16 April 1906 (aged 61); Tharwa, New South Wales, Australia
- Education: Cambridge University
- Occupations: Agriculturist, scientist
- Known for: Wheat breeding
- Scientific career
- Fields: Agronomy

William James Farrer (3 April 1845 – 16 April 1906) was a leading English Australian agronomist and plant breeder. Farrer is best remembered as the originator of the 'Federation' strain (variety) of wheat, distributed in 1903. His work resulted in significant improvements in both the quality and crop yields of Australia's national wheat harvest, a contribution for which he earned the title "father of the Australian wheat industry".

== Early years ==
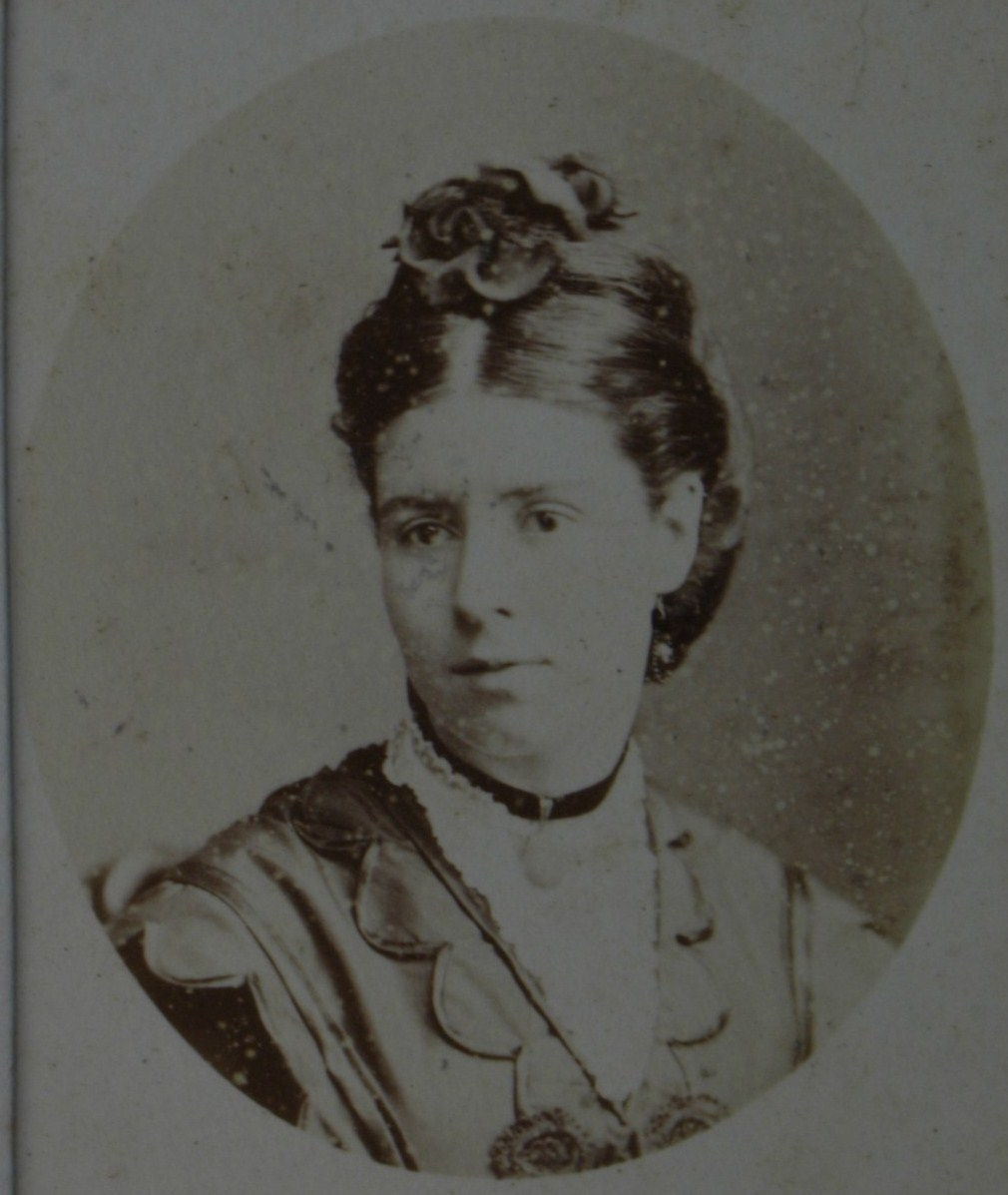
Nina Farrer (1848–1929).

Farrer was born on 3 April 1845 in the town of Docker, Westmorland, in the English north west (now Cumbria). The son of Thomas Farrer, a tenant farmer, and his wife Sarah William, William Farrer was selected for a scholarship at Christ's Hospital, London, where he was awarded a gold and silver medal for mathematics and soon earned a scholarship to Pembroke College, where after earning a bachelor of arts degree at Pembroke College, Cambridge, in 1868, Farrer emigrated to Australia in 1870. A sufferer of tuberculosis, Farrer hoped to find Australia's drier, warmer climate more agreeable to his then-delicate medical condition.

Initially, Farrer lived with friends at Parramatta, but was later employed as a tutor in Duntroon, then in regional New South Wales (NSW, now part of the Australian Capital Territory - ACT). In 1873, he published Grass and Sheep-farming A Paper: Speculative and Suggestive. After working as a tutor on George Campbell's sheep station at Duntroon, he qualified as a surveyor in 1875. Farrer worked for the Department of Lands in wheat-growing districts of NSW from 1875 to 1886.

In 1882, Farrer married Henrietta Nina, the only daughter of Leopold Fane de Salis, the then-Member of Parliament for Queanbeyan, NSW. Four years later, De Salis gave to Nina alone, 97 hectares of land. A farm rather than a station, Lambrigg (named for Farrer's home district), formerly part of Cuppacumbalong, was located on the Murrumbidgee River, near Tharwa in the present-day ACT. Farrer's initial attempts at establishing a vineyard were thwarted, as the soil proved unsuitable and he turned his attention to wheat cultivation. His goal was to produce a good loaf of bread. He would hane considered himself a scientific gardener.

== Lambrigg experiments ==
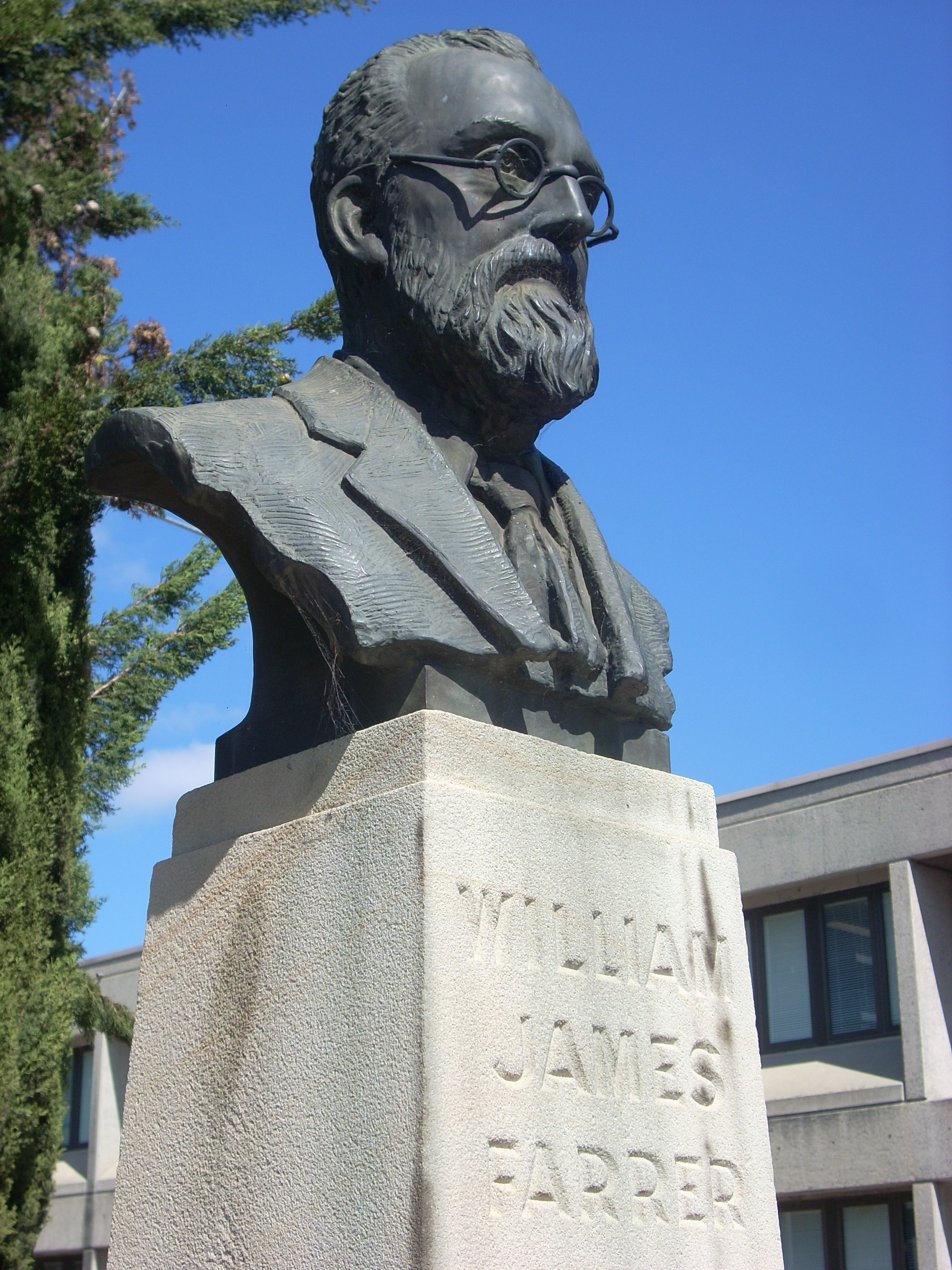
William Farrer is remembered in a Queanbeyan bust sculpture by Rayner Hoff.

Wheat leaf rust disease had a major impact on both the quality and yields of wheat harvests throughout the colonies. Farrer applied his scientific knowledge to developing wheat hybrids, initially applying cross-pollination techniques to create rust-immune strains of wheat. He readily improvised using hairpins to transfer pollen until he could obtain forceps. His scientific experiments continued over 20 years and consisted of long days of planting and developing wheat strains. He used Gregor Mendel's methods in his work. Frederick Bickell Guthrie developed small-scale procedures that emulated a flourmill and bakehouse; Farrer used these to assess the yield from the wheat strains. The results of his experiments are recorded in handwritten notebooks. To add to his knowledge of other breeders' work, he corresponded all over the world. He kept up a connection with a French wheat breeder, Henri Vilmorin, who was breeding wheat for dry areas. He also corresponded with plant breeders working in India.

Concurrently, Farrer worked on developing a strain of wheat that could resist bunt or smut-ball, another devastating enemy of wheat.

By selective breeding of varieties such as 'Professor Blount's Hybrid No.38, Gypsum', 'Canadian Fife', 'Etawah', and 'Purple Straw', Farrer aimed to produce a wheat cultivar that had the best qualities of each. Success in developing a rust-resistant, high-yielding strain greeted him in 1900, when a satisfactory series of wheat was finally obtained – the 'Federation' strain, named after the imminent Federation of Australia. He then developed a series of other strains such as 'Canberra', 'Firbank', 'Cleveland', 'Pearlie White' (named after a child in the neighbourhood who was very interested in his work), and 'Florence' (resistant to flag smut). His successes led Farrer to become a wheat experimentalist with the NSW Department of Agriculture in 1898.

These wheat strains led to a major improvement to Australia's wheat industry within a few years. 'Federation' was released to Australian farmers in 1903 and resulted in a trebling of Australia's wheat harvest over a period of 20 years. Wheat export was to become a world-class enterprise.

== Death and legacy ==
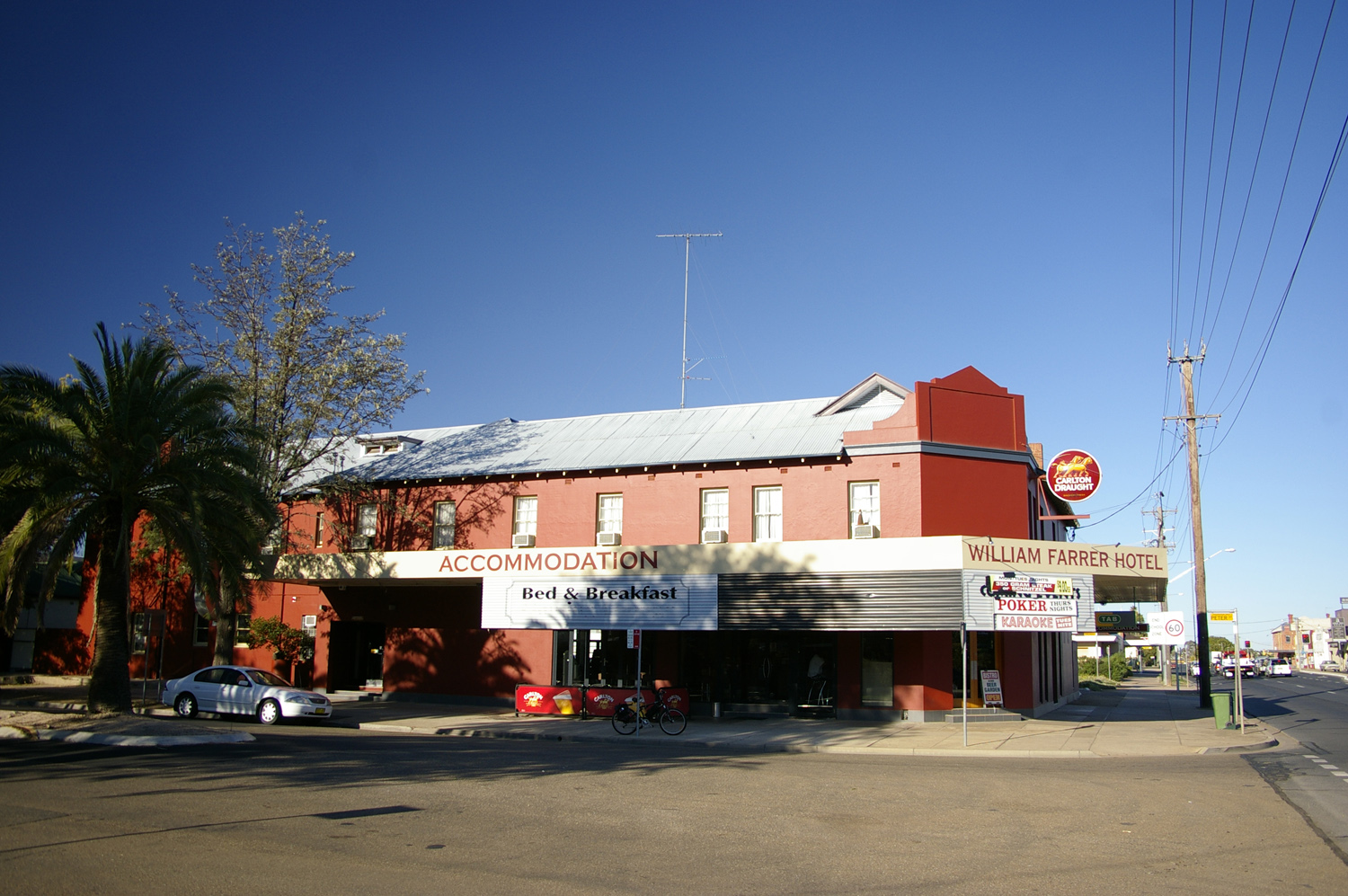
William Farrer Hotel in Wagga Wagga

Farrer died at his home Lambrigg near Tharwa, Australian Capital Territory, on 16 April 1906, after suffering a major heart attack, and was buried on his property at dusk the next day.

In 1911, the Farrer Memorial Trust was established in his memory, initially providing scholarships for agricultural studies. In 1936, the trust commenced awarding a medal for outstanding service to agricultural science. The first recipient of the medal was then-Prime Minister of Australia and Tasmanian farmer Joseph Lyons. A statue of Farrer was erected in Queanbeyan by the federal government in 1935 and another at Lambrigg in 1938.

A suburb and a primary school in Canberra have been named in his honour. The school's logo is a wheat sheaf, and the sports houses are named after his most famous types of wheat. An Australian electoral division has been named after him, and Farrer was also remembered on the reverse of the Australian two-dollar banknote issued in 1966 (now withdrawn). The Australian $2 banknote was officially replaced by a gold-coloured coin on 20 June 1988. A specialist agricultural high school (Farrer Memorial Agricultural High School, Tamworth NSW) was named in his honour and continues to provide specialist agricultural education. A hall of residence at Monash University also is named in his honour.

William Farrer is also remembered in Wagga Wagga with the Farrer Hotel and the Farrer Football League (Australian rules football).
