= Roger Kirk Johnson =

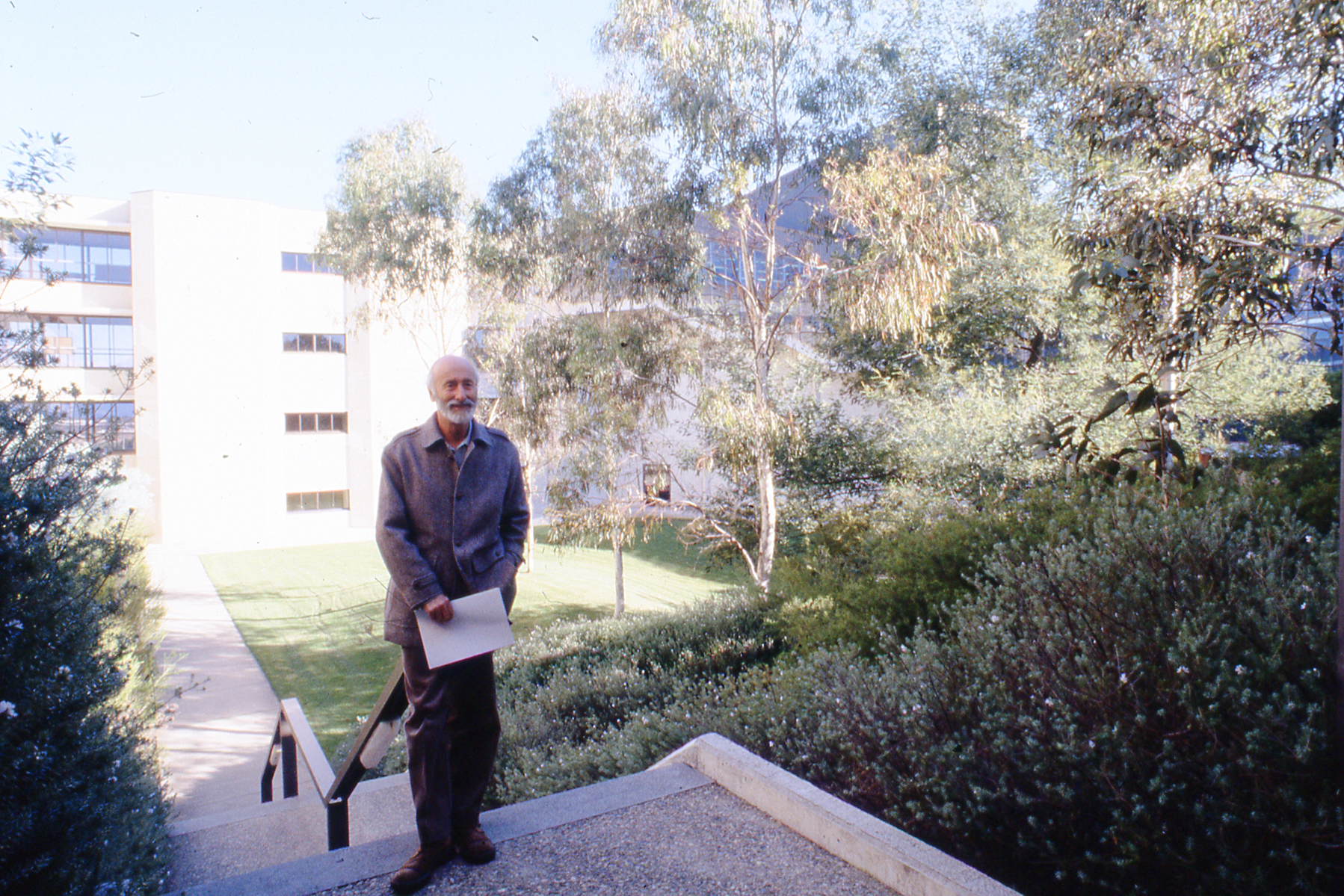
Roger Johnson in the courtyard for the School of Environmental Design (~1983)

Roger Kirk Hayes Johnson (28 December 1922 – 1991) was an architect, planner, potter, painter, sculptor, writer and educator. He graduated in Architecture with Honours from the University of Liverpool in July 1949, following an interruption in his studies caused by the Second World War. Post war he practised architecture and teaching in Kenya, South Africa, Burma, England and finally Australia where he emigrated with his family in 1960. Among his contributions to Australian architecture and architectural education were the innovative plans for Griffith University Nathan campus in Brisbane Queensland, setting the university in a natural setting with minimum disruption to the bushland.

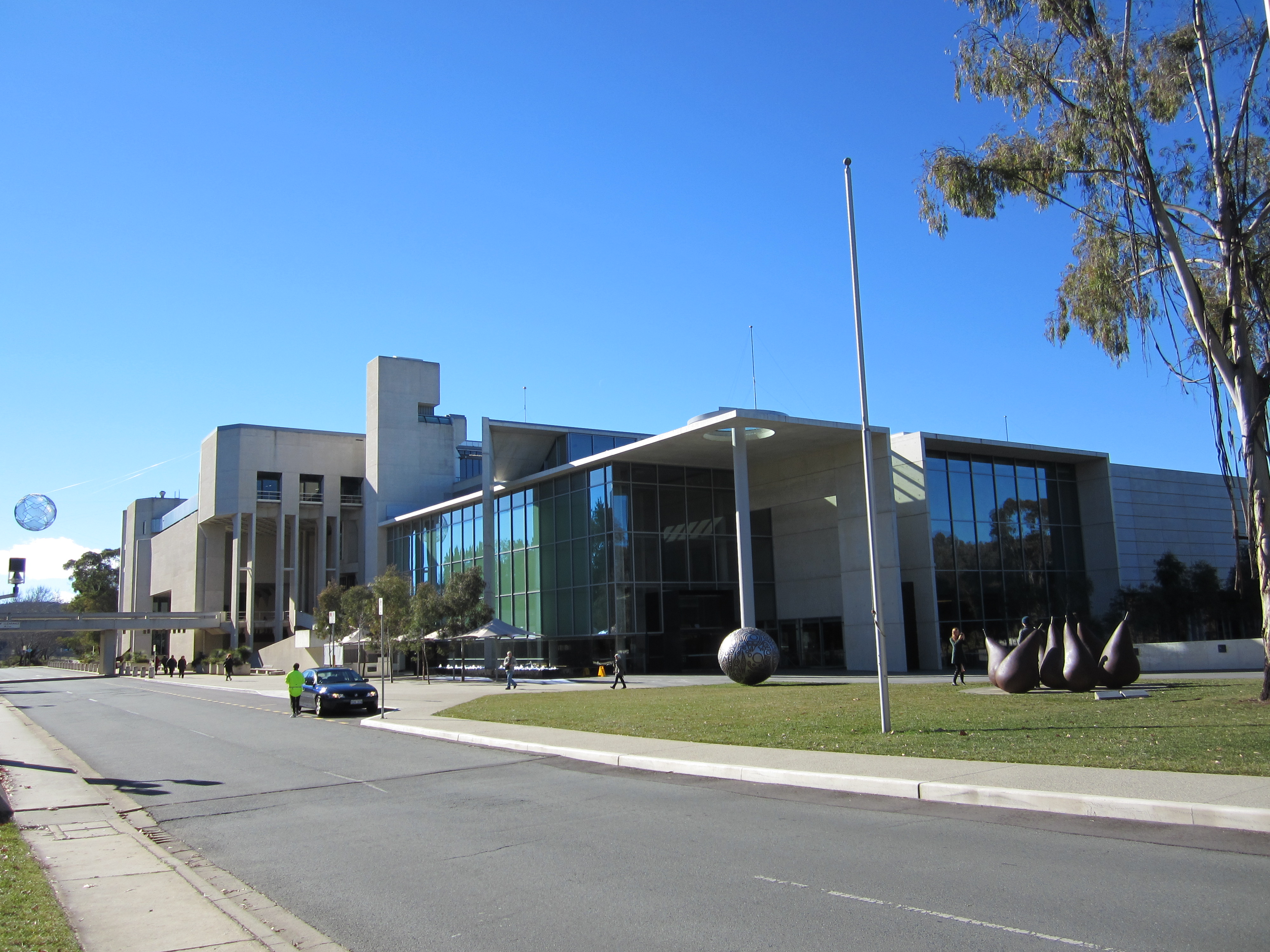
National Gallery of Australia

Johnson was the First Assistant Commissioner (Architecture) of the National Capital Development Commission, 1968–1971. Several key Canberra landmark buildings including the National Gallery of Australia and the School of Music begun construction during Johnson's time at the commission.

== Biography ==
Roger Johnson was born 28 December 1922 at Whitehaven, England. One of two sons of William Henry Johnson, mining engineer, and his wife Mary Stewart Sharpe, née Hayes. Roger's father, a talented amateur painter, was a strong creative influence and encouraged his appreciation of the natural environment. Educated at St Bees School, Cumbria, he studied at the University of Liverpool (BArch 1949, Dip. Civic Design 1951) under the town planner and architect Gordon Stephenson.

He served as a lieutenant in the Royal Naval Volunteer Reserve (1942–46). He was flying an Avenger with the 855 Squadron on 23 July 1944 when he was shot down off Dieppe while attacking a convoy of German E-boats. His crew did not survive, and he paddled in his inflatable dinghy against the wind for nearly 24 hours before being picked up by another E-boat. Johnson was transferred to Stalag Luft III in Poland where he remained a prisoner of war until 20 May 1945 when the Russians released him. He has left an illustrated diary of his time in the camp that can be accessed online through the University of Queensland.

On 9 July 1949 at St Stephen’s Church of England, Prenton, Birkenhead, he married a managerial trainee, Patricia Noel Bellis. Roger Johnson died 25 May 1991 at Bungendore, New South Wales, Australia.

== Career ==
=== Early years in Africa and Burma ===
Johnson's first significant employment was with Gordon Stephenson who had been commissioned in 1950 with the development of a housing estate in Wrexham of 1000 low-cost house on the Radburn principle s^{3}. He then applied for a position with the great Modernist Ernst May who had a practice in Kenya. Under May's tutelage Johnson was responsible for the design of the Oceanic Hotel and the palace of the Aga Khan in Dar es Salaam^{3}. He was happy working under May, but his pay was scarcely adequate for his new family of boys, Jeffrey and Nicholas, born in Kenya. They lived in a native 'banda' for sometime, and Patricia found work in offices and farms to supplement their income. He had also maintained his love of flying and also flew surveillance patrols with the Kenya Police Air Wing against the Mau-Mau insurgents. When May decided to return to Germany from his exile of many years, he gave them money to return to England. Instead Johnson found work as a temporary studio-master in Cape Town ^{3}.

In 1957 after a short spell as Deputy Director of the Department of Tropical Architecture of the Architectural Association under Otto Königsberger, during which time he did some work assisting William Holford, Roger Johnson was appointed to a Colombo Plan position to establish a School of Architecture in Rangoon. Although the numbers of students were small, and the Rector of the University Hla Myint was not in favour of architecture in a developing country, which he described as "cream puff" and which led to the absorption of the school into the Faculty of Engineering, Johnson had a fulfilling experience teaching, exploring traditional Burmese and Pagan architecture and the classical architecture of Japan where he made a side-trip. They returned to the UK in 1960 ^{3}.

=== Australia ===
In 1961 Gordon Stephenson, who had been appointed Consultant Architect to the University of Western Australia in Perth, asked Johnson to join him in its development. Under his direction the Arts, Library, Economics buildings and the New Fortune and Octagon Theatres were built. These buildings brought him into contact with Tyrone Guthrie and John Gielgud ^{3}. In 1967 he was awarded the Royal Australian Institute Home of the Year Award for a cliff house with an integrated landscape garden overlooking the Swan River.

In 1968 Roger Johnson joined the National Capital Development Commission under Sir John Overall, which was tasked with the development of Canberra and in particular the National Area, the central administrative and executive area. Following a world tour of important galleries and parliamentary centres visiting architects, town planners and artists such as Barbara Hepworth and Henry Moore, from whom he bought sculpture for Canberra, he commenced work as First Assistant Commissioner in charge of Architecture and Civic Design. In this role he prepared plans for the National Area, Belconnen Town Centre, the CSIRO headquarters and handled to construction the Australian National Gallery designed by Colin Madigan and the High Court of Australia. In addition he oversaw the development of the Cameron Offices in Belconnen and the Campbell Park, Trade and Benjamin offices. In retrospect he described the four years he spent there as one of the most productive of the NCDC's existence ^{3}. Johnson was not a supporter of the siting of Parliament House on the Capitol Hill, however, and also frustrated at the time taken and inconstancy of politicians in their decision making ^{3}. In 1972 he took up the position of University Planner for the virgin site of Griffith University, now the Nathan campus.

The Nathan campus was planned around a spine road designed for minimum disruption of the natural bush environment. Buildings were situated along the spine running gently downhill to create spaces that were "eddies and pools off the main stream". This concept was inspired by the layout of Italian hillside villages Prematurely, an opportunity arose for him to start the School of Environmental Design in the Canberra College of Advanced Education, now the University of Canberra, as he was appointed Head of School in 1972, to begin in 1973. Johnson remained, however, as consultant planner for the future development of the Nathan campus. The School of Environmental Design adopted a multidisciplinary focus and initially offered courses in architecture, environmental design and industrial design.

Among his contributions to architectural education and design is the book "The Green City" published in 1979, written as the result of a Fulbright Scholarship, that laid out in simple format and many illustrations a vision for urban development that reflected his love of the natural environment. The Green City inspired a range of projects in the 1980s in Auckland, Melbourne (The Age's "Give the Yarra a Go" campaign) and Newcastle.

Roger Johnson retired as Head of School in 1987 but continued to design and produce paintings and pottery until his death on 25 May 1991 from a heart condition. His ashes were strewn on the Rannerdale Knotts in the Lake District where he was born and had grown up.
