= Florey, Australian Capital Territory =

Florey
- Suburb
- Coordinates: 35°13′33″S 149°02′58″E
- Country: Australia
- State: Australian Capital Territory
- City: Canberra
- District: Belconnen
- Established: 1980

Government
  - Territory electorate: Ginninderra
  - Federal division: Fenner

Area
  - Total: 2.8 km^{2} (1.1 sq mi)

Population
  - Total: 4,781 (SAL 2021)
- Postcode: 2615
Suburbs around Florey
Flynn	Melba	Evatt
Latham	Florey	Belconnen
Higgins	Scullin, Page	Belconnen

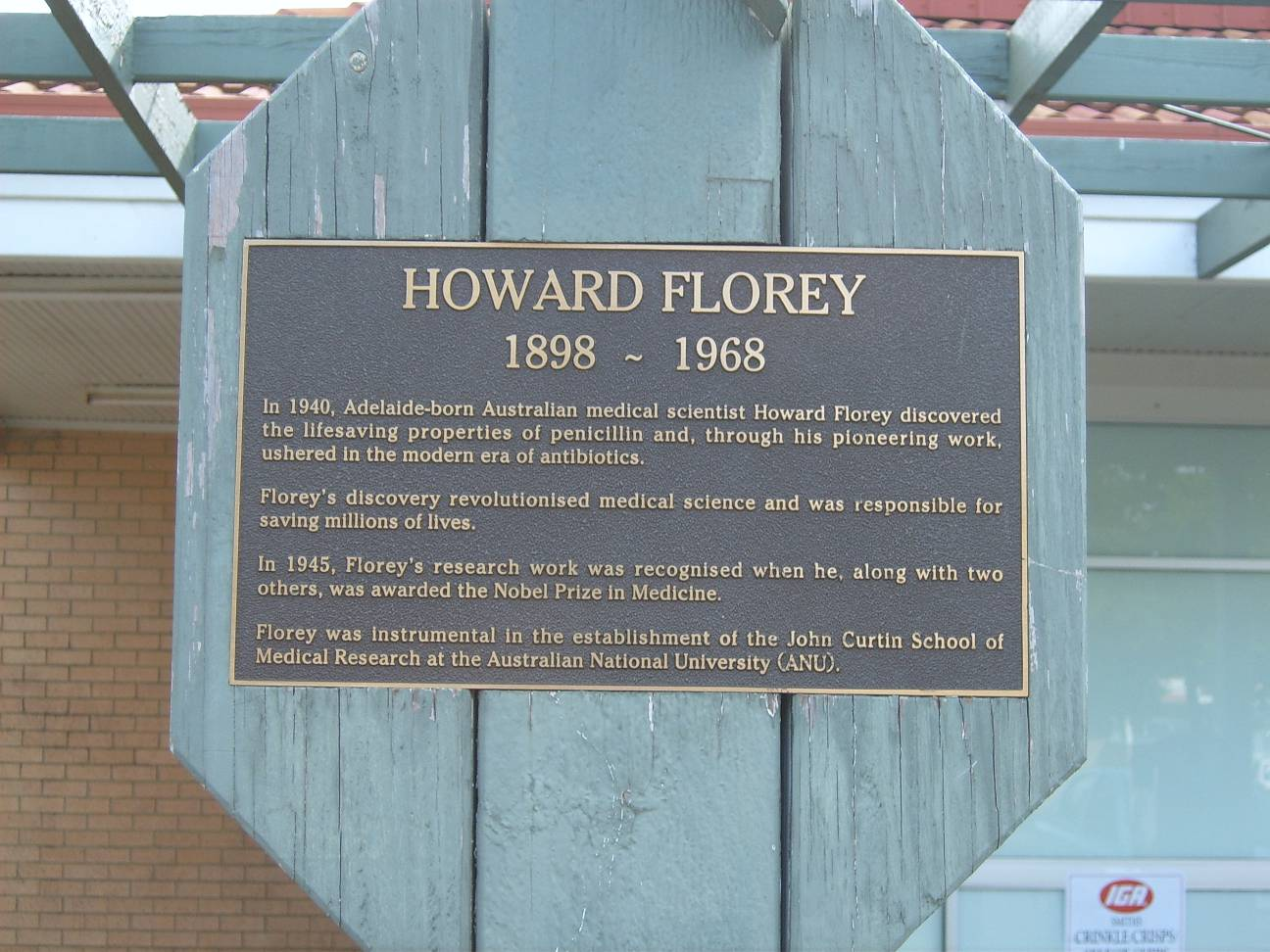
A plaque displayed at the Florey shops

Florey (/ˈflɔːri/) is a residential suburb of the Belconnen district of Canberra, located within the Australian Capital Territory, Australia. Florey was gazetted on 5 August 1975 and most houses were constructed in the mid-1980s.

The suburb itself is named after Howard Florey, Baron Florey, who shared the Nobel Prize in Physiology or Medicine in 1945 for his role in the extraction of penicillin. The streets of Florey are named after Australian scientists.

== Location ==
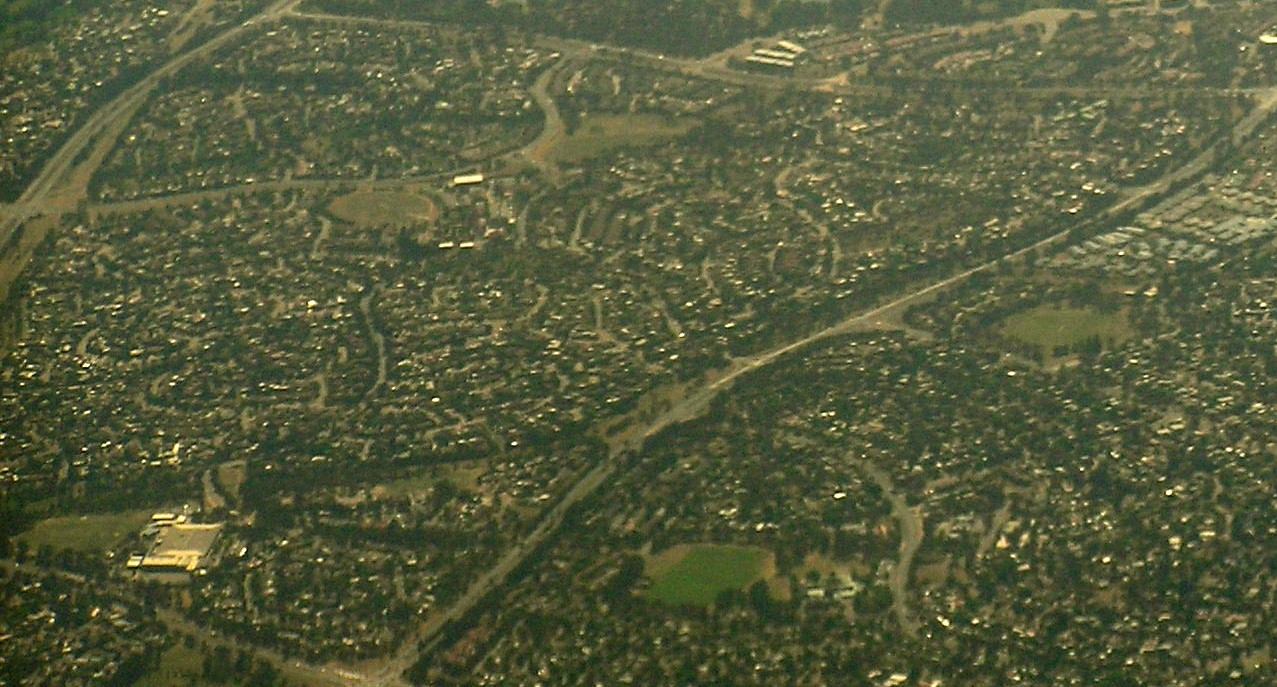
Aerial view of Florey, from the south west.

Florey is one of the closest suburb to the Belconnen Town Centre (other than the suburb of Belconnen itself), and has its own shopping centre, on the corner of Kesteven Street and Ratcliffe Crescent. The shopping centre displays a bronze plaque explaining the significance of Lord Florey's life and work.

== Original Land Use ==
Before housing commenced, Florey was approximately 250 hectares of undulating open paddocks with very few trees. Much of the area was used for sheep agistment. The area drains into and faces Ginninderra Creek to the north. At time of housing development, there was pine plantation in the north-east corner and a line of eucalypts in the south-east corner.

== Housing ==
It was proposed that Florey would have predominantly medium density housing.The first section of housing was in the south-west area and completed in 1979. In 1984, construction started on 571 sites in Florey, 120 were proposed be set aside for construction workers coming to work in Canberra and another 130 sites would be for first-homebuyers and low-income earners. The majority of housing was completed by end of 1987. Government housing is located throughout the suburb including two small developments for older residents.

== Environment ==
In 2018, the ACT Healthy Waterways Project, a joint initiative of the Commonwealth and ACT governments as part of the Murray-Darling Basin Plan, undertook waterway restoration work along Tattersall Cres that resulted in parts of a concrete drainage channel in returned to a more natural creek-like state, helping to slow and clean stormwater that flows into Ginninderra Creek.

== Education ==
The suburb supports three schools, the Catholic St. Francis Xavier College (7-12) and St John the Apostle Primary (K-6), and Florey Primary School (K-6).

St Francis Xavier High School located on Barnard Circuit was founded in 1976 and operated in the Florey building at Girls High School Braddon, now Merici College until 1977 when it moved to its permanent site in Florey. The Foundation principal was Mr Jim Smythe and it was the first lay-run Catholic High School in Canberra. In 1997, it was renamed St Francis Xavier College after it decided accept taking Years 11 and 12 students.

St John the Apostle Primary School located on Pawsey Circuit was opened in 1979. The school was blessed by Roman Catholic Archbishop of Canberra and Goulburn, the Most Reverend Edward Clancy, with Father Pat Power in 1979.

Florey Primary School, Preschool and Child Health Clinic plan was developed by Ken Maher & Partners in 1987. The design plan was based on 'school as village' concept that was at the time used for Chisholm Primary School. The school was opened in January 1989 with Narelle Hargreaves as the founding principal. The classrooms were" grouped into four separate cottages, each with four open-plan classrooms, a wet area for art and craft, a reading recovery room and a staff room.The school hall is kid-sized, with a glass tower which cries out for a school bell. Small courtyards connect the buildings and add to the village atmosphere". A new multi-purpose building was constructed as part of Rudd Government's Building the Education Revolution and its design was awarded Australian Institute of Architects – Public Architecture Commendation. There is an oval adjacent to the school and in 2020 it is not used by sporting groups due to lack of regular maintenance.

== Health Services ==
Florey Medical Centre located in Kestevan Street was opened in March 1988 and was Canberra's first private medical centre to open 24 hours a day. The centre was the brainchild of Mr Robertson and Dr George Szmcrler, a medical practitioner at the government-run Scullin Health Centre. When it was opened it had an "elegant foyer is decorated with marble, mirrors, leather lounge chairs and restful pink/peach colours". The Centre no longer operates 24 hours a day but is open seven days a week.

== Transport ==
In 2020, three ACTION bus routes are connected to Florey – Route 2, Route 3 and Route 40.

== Hindu Temple and Cultural Centre ==
The Hindu Temple and Cultural Centre (HTCC) is located on Ratcliffe Crescent, Florey Canberra. It is one of the first temples built in Canberra and was first opened to the public in 1999. It is a public tourist site.

== Community organisations ==
Florey Neighbourhood Watch has operated at times during the suburb's existence and was reactivated in March 2018. It holds regular community forums and has organised several Clean Up Days and Fabulous Florey Community Fair in 2019.

== Governance ==
For the purposes of Australian federal elections for the House of Representatives, Florey is in the Division of Fenner.

For the purposes of Australian Capital Territory elections for the ACT Legislative Assembly, Florey is in the Ginninderra electorate.

== Geology ==
Going from the north east corner to the south west, bands of the following rocks, all of Silurian age, make up the geology of Florey:

- Green grey dacite and quartz andesite of the Hawkins Volcanics
- The Deakin Fault
- Calcareous shale from the Yass Subgroup
- green grey and purple rhyodacite
- purple rhyodacite
- pink rhyolite
- purple-pink rhyolite
