= Belconnen =

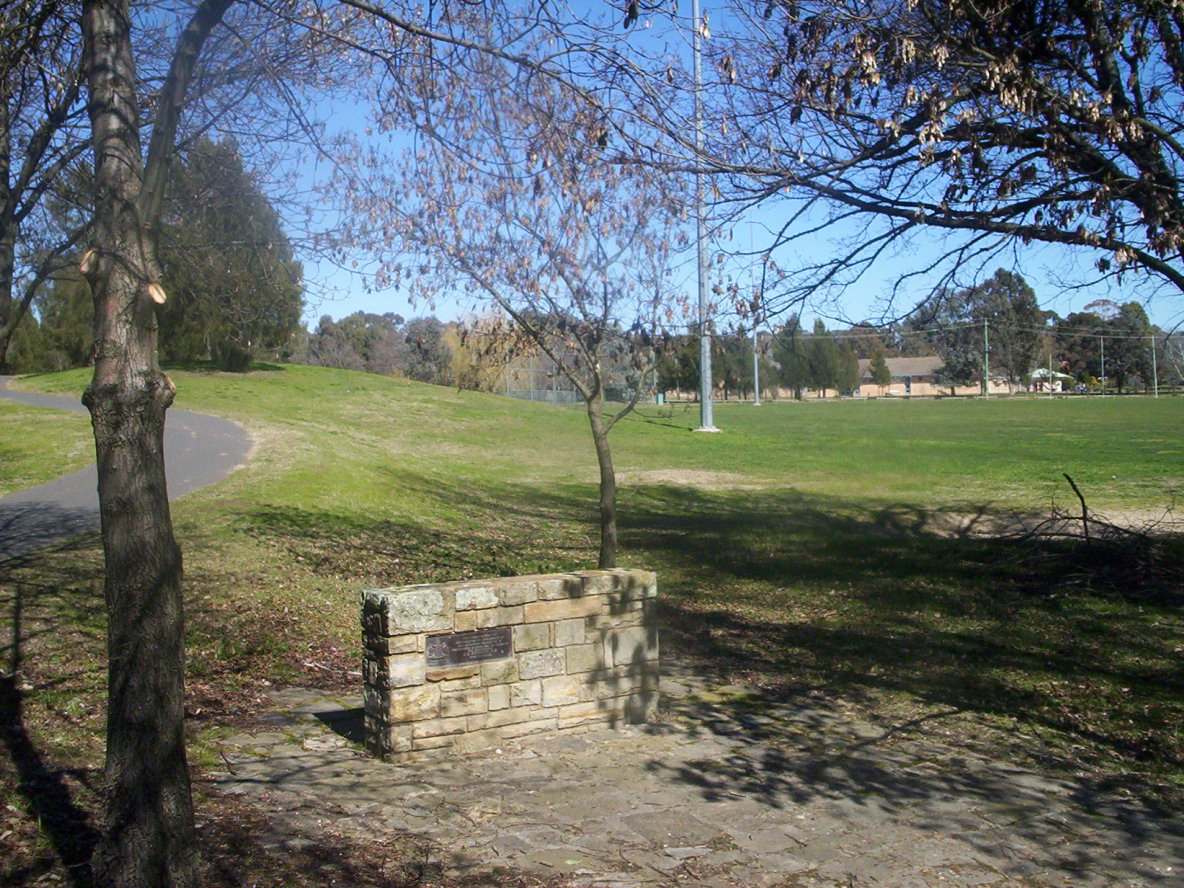
- Tablet at Aranda playing fields marks the beginning of the development of Belconnen in 1966.

- Interactive map of Belconnen
- Coordinates: 35.2386°S 149.0661°E
- Country: Australia
- State: Australian Capital Territory
- Location: 7 km (4.3 mi) NW of Canberra

Government
  - Territory electorates: Ginninderra; Yerrabi
  - Federal divisions: Fenner; Canberra

Area
  - Total: 77 km^{2} (30 sq mi)

Population
  - Total: 106,061 (2021 census)
  - Density: 1,377/km^{2} (3,567/sq mi)
- Postcode: 2614-2617
- Gazetted: 12 May 1966
Localities around Belconnen
Wallaroo (NSW)	Hall (district)	Gungahlin (district)
Parkwood (NSW); Coree (district)	Belconnen	Canberra Central (district)
Stromlo (district)	Molonglo Valley (district)	Canberra Central (district)

Belconnen (/bɛlˈkɒnɪn/) is a district in the Australian Capital Territory in Australia. The district is subdivided into 27 divisions (suburbs), sections and blocks. As at the 2021 census, the district had a population of 106,061 people; and was the most populous district within the Australian Capital Territory (ACT).

Belconnen is situated approximately 7 kilometres (4.3 mi) to the north-west of the central business district of Canberra, and surrounds an artificially created, ornamental lake, Lake Ginninderra. Lake Ginninderra was made possible by building a dam at an elbow of Ginninderra Creek. Exiting the lake, via a simple overflow, Ginninderra Creek continues, and runs north-west to its confluence with the Murrumbidgee River just beyond the north-western ACT border.

== Establishment and governance ==
Following the transfer of land from the Government of New South Wales to the Commonwealth Government in 1911, the district was established in 1966 by the Commonwealth via the gazettal of the Districts Ordinance 1966 (Cth) which, after the enactment of the Australian Capital Territory (Self-Government) Act 1988, became the Districts Act 1966. This Act was subsequently repealed by the ACT Government and the district is now administered subject to the Districts Act 2002.

=== History ===
Belconnen was previously occupied by Ginninderra, the former agricultural lands that corresponds with the watershed of Ginninderra Creek. The Belconnen district is named after one of the earliest land grants made in the district during colonial times. Belconnen a land grant totalling 800 hectares (2,000 acres) was made to explorer Charles Sturt who eventually sold the property to Robert Campbell who owned the nearby Duntroon Estate.

A stone plaque located at the sport fields in Aranda, Belconnen's first suburb, commemorates the commencement of urban development of the Belconnen district, inscribed:

"This tablet marks the inauguration of development of the district of Belconnen by the Minister of State for the Interior The Honourable J. D. Anthony, M.P. 23rd June 1966"

The nearby Jamison Centre, the first commercial centre in the district, opened in 1969. The Belconnen Town Centre located on the shore of Lake Ginninderra opened in the late 1970s.

=== Contemporary governance ===
For the purposes of Australian federal elections for the House of Representatives, the District of Belconnen is contained within the electoral divisions of Fenner and Canberra.

For the purposes of Australian Capital Territory elections for the ACT Legislative Assembly, most of Belconnen is within the Ginninderra electorate, but the suburbs of Giralang and Kaleen are in Yerrabi.

== Location and urban structure ==
The Belconnen district is a set of 27 contiguous residential suburbs that surround the Belconnen Town Centre, set on the western shore of the artificially established Lake Ginninderra. In addition to the residential development, the district contains some pastoral leasees on its western and south-western boundaries with the districts of Molonglo Valley and Stromlo, its north-western boundary with the state of New South Wales, and its northern and north-eastern boundaries with the districts of Hall and Gungahlin. The natural features of the district are constrained to the east and to the south-east by the Bruce Ridge and the northern slopes of Black Mountain, much of which has been preserved as nature reserves.

=== Residential and industrial development ===
The majority of the residential suburbs are predominantly characterised by detached single family homes on suburban blocks, with pockets of medium density housing units or town houses. This is most pronounced in the suburbs of Belconnen, Bruce, Cook, Hawker, Holt, Kaleen, Macquarie, Melba, Page and Scullin. Within the suburb of Belconnen, a medium density estate, often mistaken as a suburb, called Emu Ridge consists entirely of town house and unit developments, such as UniGardens, Belconnen accommodation for University of Canberra students (run by UniGardens Pty). The most recent suburb to be gazetted is Lawson in 1986, where infrastructure works have commenced and residential development is in progress.

Within the district of Belconnen, there is almost no 'heavy' industry; however there is some light industry and manufacturing, including automotive repair, plumbing, electrical, building, and similar services as well as small arts and crafts manufacturing and sales outlets. A variety of medical practitioners and veterinarians also service the region. There is an established artistic community which includes aspiring performing musicians, theatre groups and visual artists. A recycling industry, involving organic as well as plastic and metals collection takes place at the Parkwood Road Recycling Estate, on the outermost western boundary of the district, within the suburb of Holt. A poultry farm is situated nearby and is a significant primary industry producer providing eggs to Canberra and the surrounding region.

=== Retail and commercial development ===
The predominant shopping centre of the district is Westfield Belconnen, located within the Belconnen Town Centre. Additional local commerce activity includes large and smaller department stores, clothes retailers, car dealerships, homeware, supermarkets, and specialist grocery outlets. There are numerous restaurants and a variety of licensed premises within the Belconnen Town Centre, many close to the shores of Lake Ginninderra. The Belconnen Markets are a fresh food market area within this commercial district operating from Tuesday to Sunday during business hours. Smaller retail shopping centres are located at the Jamison Centre in the suburb of Macquarie; the Kippax Centre in the suburb of Holt; and shopping centres in the suburbs of Charnwood, Hawker, and Kaleen. The surrounding suburbs were designed each to have their own smaller shopping areas, with small supermarkets, chemists, hairdressers etc.

Within the Belconnen Town Centre is a number of Australian Government department head offices including the Department of Immigration and Border Protection, the Australian Bureau of Statistics, the Australian Broadcasting Authority and the Australian Communications and Media Authority. The Australian Taxation Office had offices located in the Belconnen Town Centre in the Cameron Offices.

A public hospital, North Canberra Hospital, (previously Calvary Hospital, which was a private-operated public hospital) is located in the suburb of Bruce. Also in the suburb of Bruce are a number of sporting and education facilities including the University of Canberra (UC), the Canberra Institute of Technology (or CIT), the Australian Institute of Sport (AIS), and Canberra Stadium.

== Demographics ==
At the 2021 census, there were 106,061 people in the Belconnen district, of these 49.5 per cent were male and 50.5 per cent were female. Aboriginal and Torres Strait Islander people made up 2.1 per cent of the population, which was lower than the national and territory averages. The median age of people in the Belconnen district was 35 years, which was lower than the national median of 38 years. Children aged 0 – 14 years made up 18.1 per cent of the population and people aged 65 years and over made up 15.1 per cent of the population. Of people in the area aged 15 years and over, 46.6 per cent were married and 10.5 per cent were either divorced or separated.

Population growth in the Belconnen district between the 2001 census and the 2011 census was 13.6 per cent; and in the subsequent ten years to the 2021 census, the population grew by 14.7 per cent. When compared with total population growth of Australia for the same periods, being 14.6 per cent and 18.2 per cent respectively, population growth in Belconnen district was lower than the national average. The median weekly income for residents within the Belconnen district was significantly higher than the national average, and slightly lower than the territory average.

At the 2021 census, the proportion of residents in the Belconnen district who stated their ancestry as Australian or English was 65.5 per cent of all residents (national average was 62.9 per cent). Meanwhile, as at the census date, compared to the national average, households in the Belconnen district had a marginally higher than average proportion (26.6 per cent) where a non-English language was used (national average was 24.8 per cent); and a similar proportion (72.4 per cent) where English only was spoken at home (national average was 72.0 per cent).

Selected historical census data for the Belconnen district
Census year		2001	2006	2011	2016	2021
Population	Estimated residents on census night	81,701	84,382	92,444	96,049	106,061
Population	District rank in terms of size within the Australian Capital Territory	2nd	2nd	▲1st	1st	1st
Population	Percentage of the Australian Capital Territory population			25.9%	24.2%	23.4%
Population	Percentage of the Australian population	0.44%	▼0.42%	▲0.43%	▼0.41%	▲0.42%
Cultural and language diversity						
Ancestry, top responses	Australian			26.9%	23.7%	32.8%
Ancestry, top responses	English			32.7%	24.1%	24.1%
Ancestry, top responses	Irish			9.1%	9.3%	11.7%
Ancestry, top responses	Scottish			7.0%	7.3%	10.2%
Ancestry, top responses	Chinese			3.3%	4.4%	5.9%
Language, top responses (other than English)	Mandarin		▲1.4%	▲2.2%	▲3.7%	▼3.4%
Language, top responses (other than English)	Vietnamese	1.1%	▲1.2%	▲1.3%	1.3%	▲1.5%
Language, top responses (other than English)	Nepali					▲1.3%
Language, top responses (other than English)	Spanish	1.0%	1.0%	1.0%	1.0%	▲1.1%
Language, top responses (other than English)	Punjabi					▲1.0%
Language, top responses (other than English)	Italian	1.4%	▼1.2%	▼1.0%	▼0.9%	
Language, top responses (other than English)	Cantonese	n/c	n/c	▲0.9%	0.9%	
Religious affiliation						
Religious affiliation, top responses	No Religion	19.2%	▲23.3%	▲28.9%	▲37.1%	▲44.5%
Religious affiliation, top responses	Catholic	28.8%	▼27.6%	▼25.3%	▼21.7%	▼18.9%
Religious affiliation, top responses	Anglican	18.0%	▼16.3%	▼14.3%	▼10.7%	▼8.1%
Religious affiliation, top responses	Hinduism					▲3.8%
Religious affiliation, top responses	Uniting Church	4.9%	▼4.4%	▼3.7%	▼2.7%	
Religious affiliation, top responses	Buddhism			▲2.4%		
Median weekly incomes						
Personal income	Median weekly personal income		A$680	A$858	A$919	A$1,102
Personal income	Percentage of Australian median income		145.9%	▲148.7%	▼138.8%	▼136.9%
Family income	Median weekly family income		A$1,662	A$2,120	A$2,285	A$2,628
Family income	Percentage of Australian median income		141.9%	▲143.1%	▼131.8%	▼124.0%
Household income	Median weekly household income		A$1,440	A$1,802	A$1,915	A$2,227
Household income	Percentage of Australian median income		140.2%	▲146.0%	▼133.2%	▼127.5%
Dwelling structure						
Type	Separate house	81.3%	▼82.0%	▼77.0%	▼72.4%	▼69.4%
Type	Semi-detached, row or terrace house, townhouse etc.	13.1%	▼12.3%	▲14.8%	▲16.7%	▲17.3%
Type	Flat, unit or apartment	5.1%	▲5.6%	▲8.1%	▲10.7%	▲13.2%

== List of suburbs ==
- Aranda
- Belconnen
- Bruce
- Charnwood
- Cook
- Dunlop
- Evatt
- Florey
- Flynn
- Fraser
- Giralang
- Hawker
- Higgins
- Holt
- Kaleen
- Latham
- Lawson
- Macgregor
- Macnamara
- Macquarie
- McKellar
- Melba
- Page
- Scullin
- Spence
- Strathnairn
- Weetangera
- Emu Ridge, often considered a suburb, has not since been gazetted, and is a housing estate, within the suburb of Belconnen.
- Fern Hill Park, often considered a suburb, has not since been gazetted, and is a business and residential estate, within the suburb of Bruce.

== Transport ==
The primary mode of transport within the District is by private vehicle. The District of Belconnen was planned in the 1960s and was guided by a philosophy of reliance on private personal transport and an abundance of roads. Public buses serve the district with local and express services; the primary interchange is off Benjamin Way in the town centre.

=== Roads ===
Belconnen is well served by a network of near-freeway-quality roads located between suburbs and intersecting the district. The main roads between suburbs are typically landscaped with mounds of earth and vegetation to form 'parkways'.

The main roads connecting the district with North Canberra and the city centre are Belconnen Way and Ginninderra Drive. These roads are 6 lane parkways for the majority of their length and run in an east–west direction. Belconnen is situated south of the Barton Highway which leads to Yass, where it connects with the Hume Highway to Sydney and Melbourne. To the south of the district is William Hovell Drive which connects the southern and western suburbs of Belconnen with Parkes Way and the Tuggeranong Parkway which lead to the city centre and Canberra's southern districts respectively.

=== Public transport ===
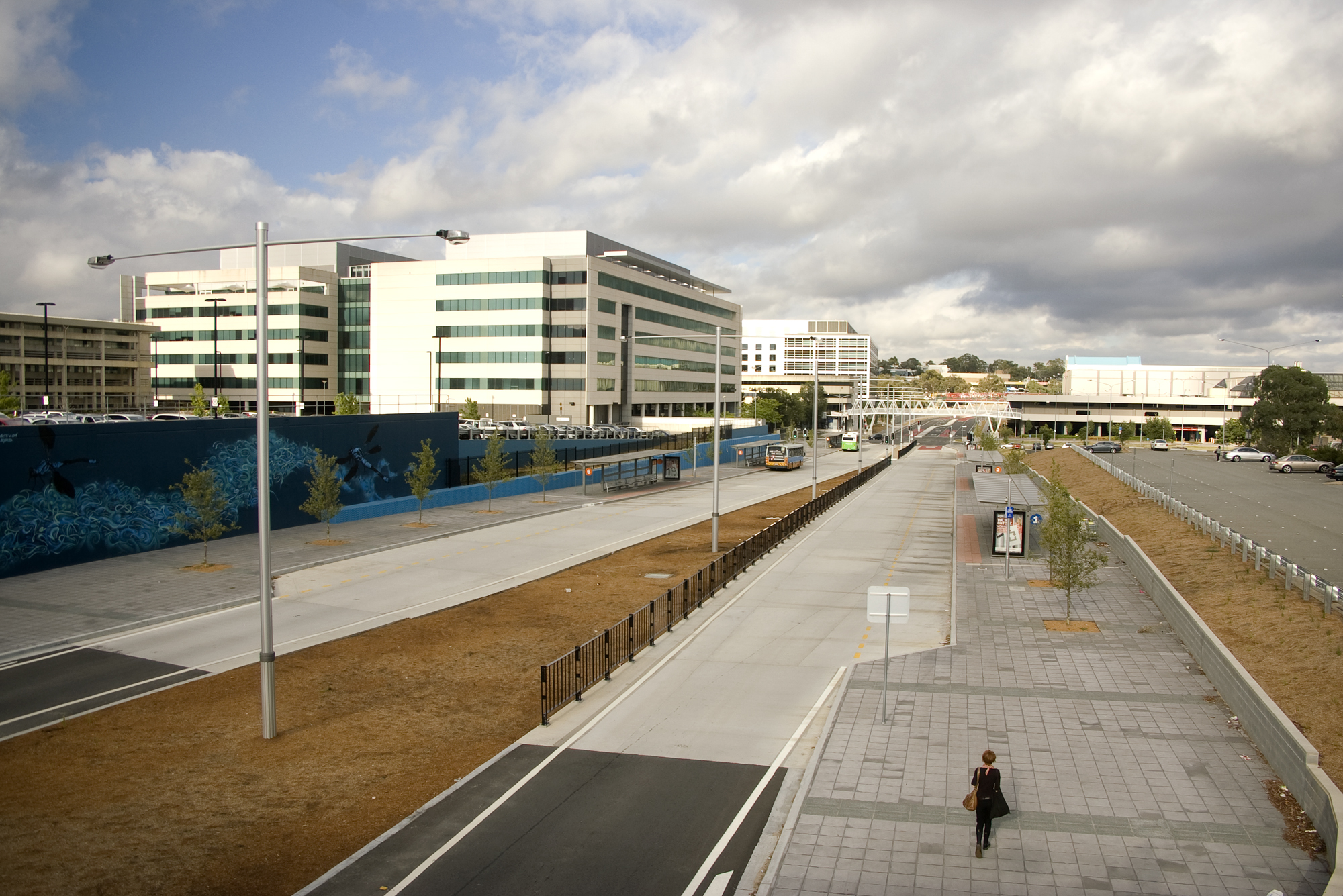
Belconnen Community Bus Station, located on the former site of the original bus interchange

The ACTION bus services which provides public transport throughout Canberra is the only form of regularly scheduled public transport in Belconnen. Services from the various suburbs generally pass through a bus interchange at Belconnen Town Centre from where they continue to Civic and the other town centres to Canberra's south. Some services travel to Gungahlin. There are also express services which connect directly with Tuggeranong.

The bus interchange is spread across the Belconnen town centre in three different locations. The previous interchange, which is now one of those locations, was connected by footbridge to large shopping centre and to office buildings occupied by major Government departments. It was an ageing facility which was criticised for being unsafe, particularly at night, and for being dirty and prone to vandalism. For these reasons it was subject to major renovations.

The ACT Government plans to construct a busway to connect the Belconnen Town centre with the hospital and CIT precinct in Bruce and the city centre.

=== Cycling ===
The Belconnen Bikeway goes through the district.

== Places of note and interest ==
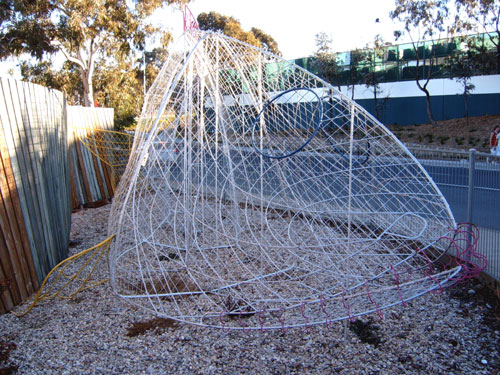
Albert is a metal frame sculpture of a carp (fish). Created for Floriade 1996, it was erected at Belconnen Fresh Food Markets in 1998.

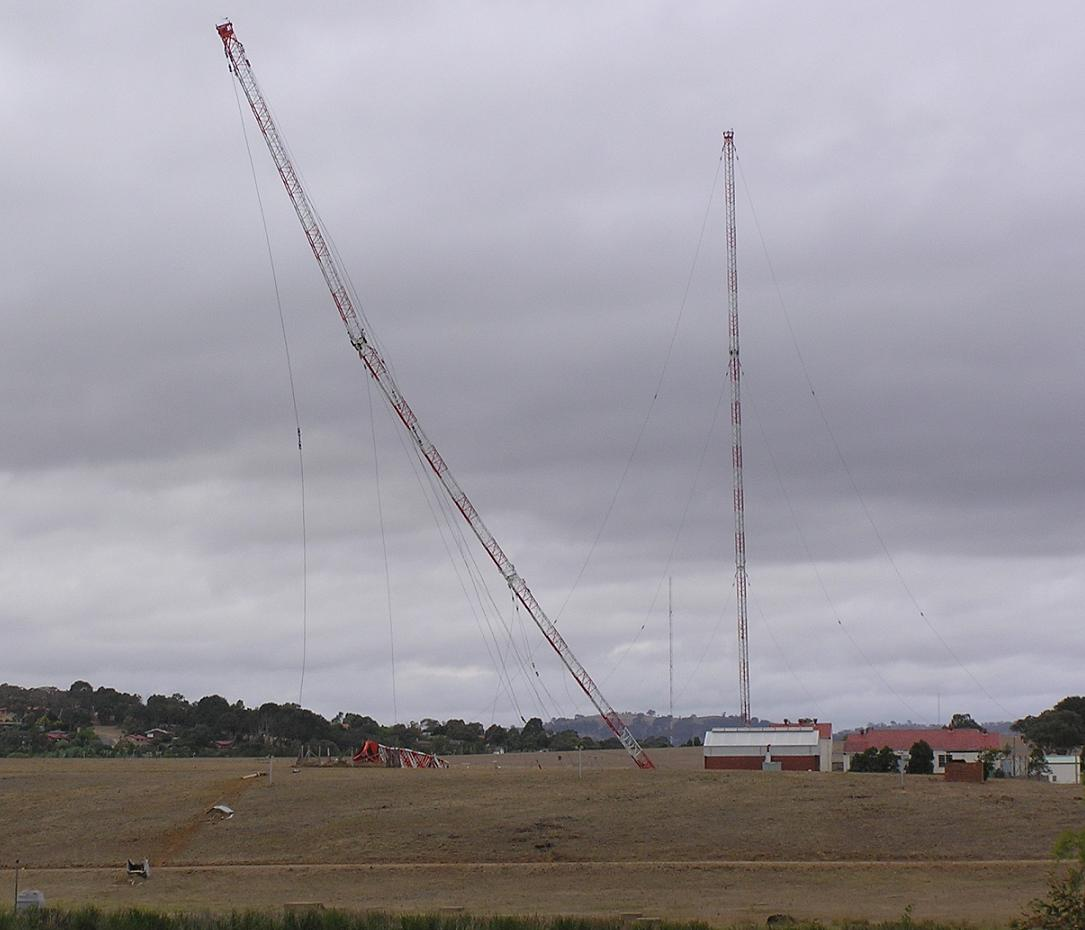
The central and eastern towers at Belconnen Naval Transmitting Station being felled, at 4.07 pm, 20 December 2006. The western tower fell at 3.24 pm; visible lying on foreground rise.

- The Belconnen Town Centre has a major shopping mall, Westfield Belconnen, operated by the Scentre Group, surrounded by government and private offices, and a light industrial area. Belconnen Mall was opened to the public in February 1978.
- Belconnen Fresh Food Markets is home to the Giant Mushroom playground, featuring a six-metre high pink, yellow and blue mushroom.
- Cameron Offices, a partially demolished example of Brutalist architecture immediately south of the Belconnen Bus Interchange on Chandler Street. First building to be built in the town centre.
- Government offices headquartered in Belconnen include the Australian Taxation Office (ATO), the Department of Immigration and Border Protection, the Australian Communications & Media Authority (ACMA), ComSuper and the Australian Bureau of Statistics (ABS).
- In the suburb of Bruce are:
  - University of Canberra
  - a campus of the Canberra Institute of Technology
  - Lake Ginninderra
  - Canberra Stadium
  - Australian Institute of Sport
  - Calvary Hospital
- The Royal Australian Navy established a very low and high frequency radio transmitting station in Belconnen in the 1930s, as part of the naval communications base HMAS Harman. Belconnen Naval Transmitting Station operated until 2005, with its transmitter towers felled in 2006, and part of the site marked for the new suburb of Lawson.
- Historic Home of Lara Morris

== Education ==
The University of Canberra is located in the suburb of Bruce and has a student population of approximately 10,000. A Canberra Institute of Technology (CIT) campus is also in Bruce.

The Australian Capital Territory Government operates 23 Preschools, 19 Primary Schools, 5 High Schools and 3 Colleges (Senior Secondary Schools) within the District of Belconnen. There are also 8 religious schools and one Government special school for students with disabilities. Prominent High schools include Radford College and Canberra High. Belconnen is also the home to the ACT's only government operated Year 7–12 school, with the dual campus Melba Copland Secondary School located in the North-Eastern suburb of Melba.
