= Emu Ridge, Australian Capital Territory =

Emu Ridge
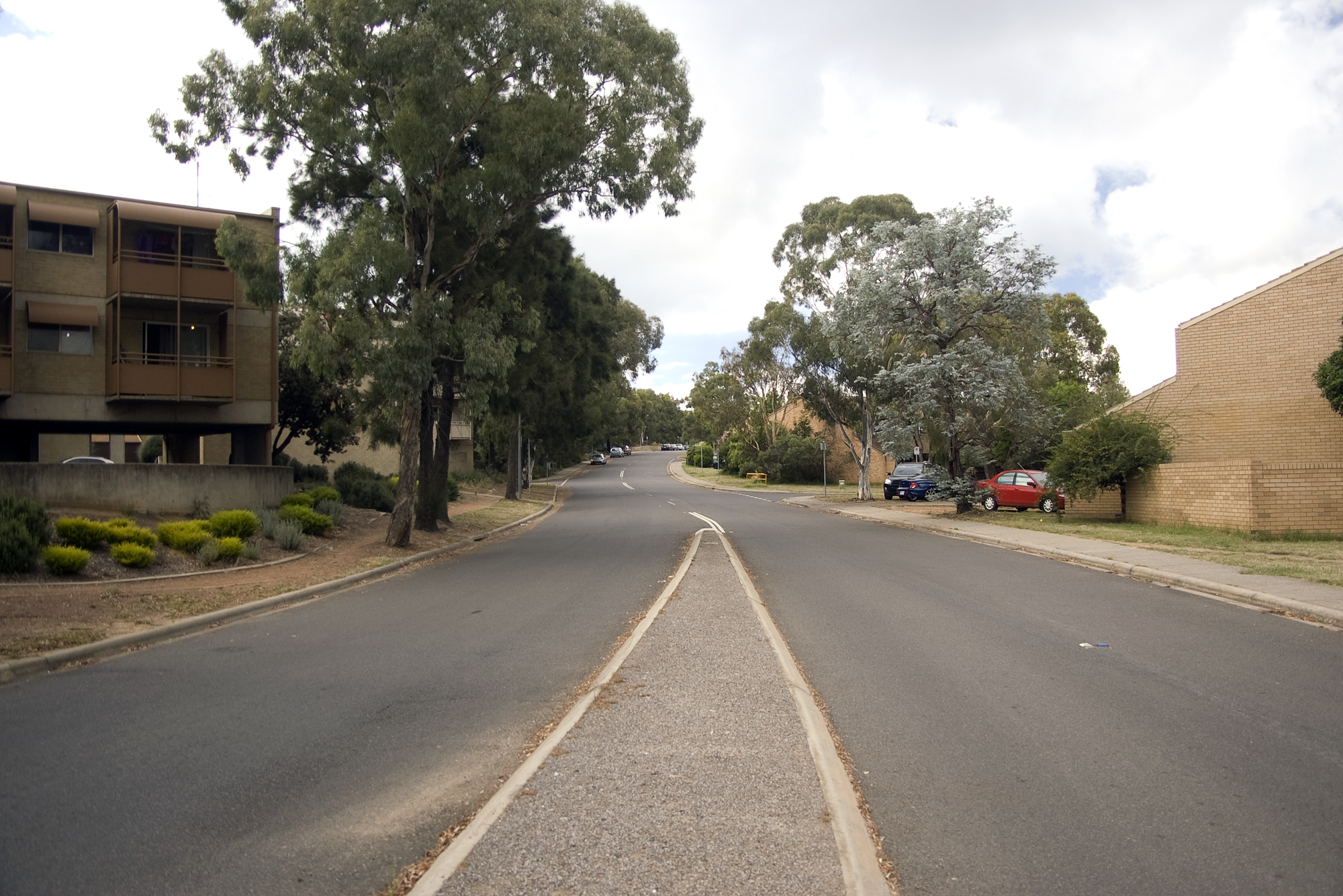
- Condell Street in Emu Ridge

- Coordinates: 35°15′00″S 149°04′30″E
- Country: Australia
- State: Australian Capital Territory
- City: Belconnen

Government
  - Territory electorate: Ginninderra
  - Federal division: Fenner

Emu Ridge is a housing estate in the suburb of Belconnen, located in the district of Belconnen, in Canberra, within the Australian Capital Territory (ACT) in Australia. Emu Ridge is bounded by Benjamin Way, College Street, Eastern Valley Way and Belconnen Way. The two main thoroughfares are Hennessy Street and Condell Street, with many cul-de-sacs off these.

== Nomenclature ==
Many people consider Emu Ridge to be the name of a suburb, and it is widely used in Canberra, even on some (though not most) official maps. It does not, however, have any official standing as a place name. There are other instances of estate names becoming de facto suburb names in Canberra, such as Gleneagles in the suburb of Kambah, Harcourt Hill in the suburb of Nicholls, and Swinger Hill in the suburb of Phillip. These are all discrete estates within larger suburbs, but none of these names have been officially gazetted by the Australian Capital Territory Government. In recent years an application was made to the ACT Government by residents of Swinger Hill to have their estate name officially recognised as a suburb name, but this was rejected. The ACT Government has, however, erected official suburb signs for Swinger Hill, which it has not done for other estates.

Emu Ridge became especially popular as a name because in Belconnen's case "Belconnen" has been used as the name of the entire district, as well as the central suburb in that district. This has also happened in Canberra's newest district Gungahlin, to Belconnen's north. Other urban districts in Canberra have names for their central suburbs – or town centre suburbs – that are different from the district's name: Phillip in Woden Valley, Greenway in Tuggeranong, and Weston in Weston Creek; Civic, or City, is considered the centre of North Canberra (and Canberra as a whole), while no one suburb is readily identifiable as South Canberra's centre, although Manuka – a shopping precinct in the suburbs of Griffith and Forrest – may be considered by many to be that district's centre.

== Political representation ==
For the purposes of Australian federal elections for the House of Representatives, Emu Ridge is in Fenner.

For the purposes of Australian Capital Territory elections for the ACT Legislative Assembly, Emu Ridge is in the Ginninderra electorate.
