= Scullin, Australian Capital Territory =

Scullin
- Suburb
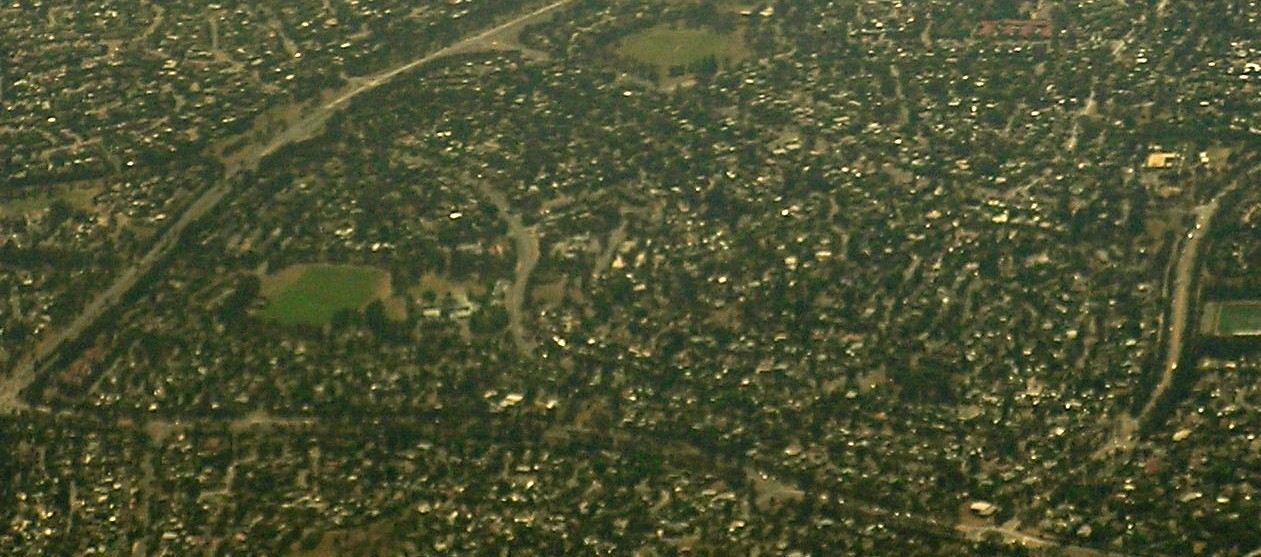
- Aerial view of Scullin, from the west.

- Country: Australia
- State: Australian Capital Territory
- City: Canberra
- District: Belconnen
- Established: 1968

Government
  - Territory electorate: Ginninderra
  - Federal division: Fenner

Area
  - Total: 1.4 km^{2} (0.54 sq mi)

Population
  - Total: 3,069 (SAL 2021)
- Postcode: 2614
Suburbs around Scullin
| Latham | Florey | Florey |
| Higgins | Scullin | Page |
| | Hawker | Hawker |

Scullin (/ˈskʌlɪn/) is a residential suburb in the Belconnen district of Canberra, located within the Australian Capital Territory, Australia. The suburb is named after Prime Minister of Australia James Scullin. It was gazetted on 6 June 1968. In the city of Canberra, suburbs are assigned street names that reflect a distinct sub-group of cultural or historical Australian significance. The streets in the suburb of Scullin are named after aviators. Scullin is located adjacent to the suburbs of Higgins, Florey, Page and Hawker. Southern Cross Early Childhood School and Scullin neighbourhood oval are located within the suburb. It is bordered by Kingsford Smith Drive, Belconnen Way, Southern Cross Drive and Chewings Street. Scullin is approximately 20 minutes walk and 5 minutes by car from the Belconnen Town Centre and 15 minutes walk and 3 minutes by car from the Hawker Shopping Centre. It is approximately 10 to 15 minutes by car from Canberra City and 30 minutes from Canberra Airport.

== Governance ==
For the purposes of Australian federal elections for the House of Representatives, Scullin is in the Division of Fenner.

For the purposes of Australian Capital Territory elections for the ACT Legislative Assembly, Scullin is in the Ginninderra electorate.

== Geology ==
Rocks in Scullin are from the Silurian age. Green grey rhyodacite of the Walker Volcanics underlie the south and centre of the suburb. North of centre is purple and green-grey dacite of the Walker Volcanics that was deposited before the rhyodacite. A strip along the far north east has pink rhyolite from the Deakin Volcanics. Purple pink rhyolite from the Deakin Volcanics is in the north west of the strip.

== Education ==
Scullin residents get preference for:

- Southern Cross Early Childhood School
- A shared Priority Enrolment Area (PEA) of Florey Primary, Hawker Primary, and Weetangera Primary
- Belconnen High School
- Hawker College
