= Belconnen Arts Centre =

Arts facility in Canberra, Australia

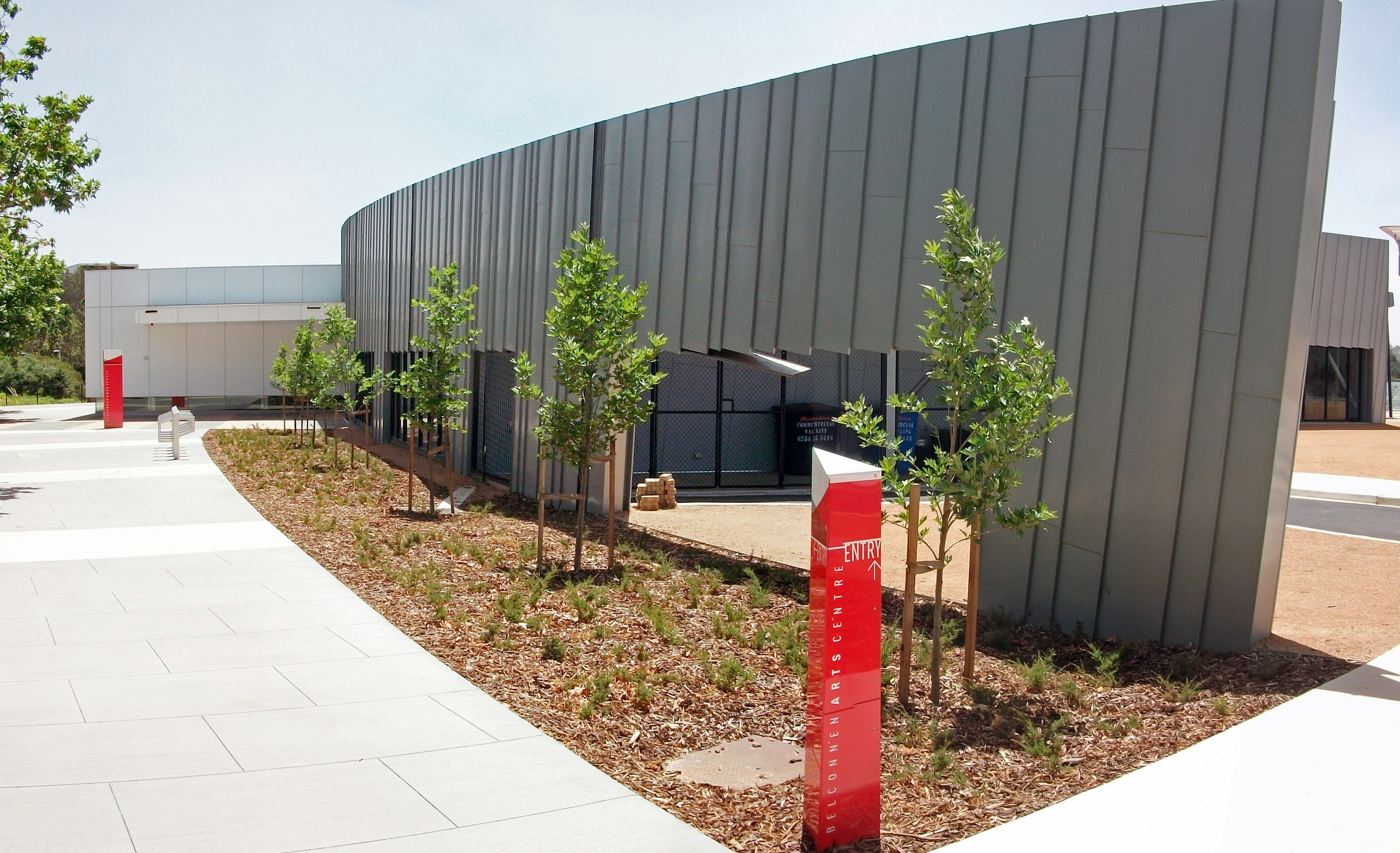
- Established: 2009; 17 years ago
- Location: Belconnen, Canberra, Australian Capital Territory
- Type: Arts Centre
- Directors: Monika McInerney and Jack Lloyd
- Chairperson: Phil Nizette
- Architects: Williams Ross Architects, Project Coordination
- Owner: ACT Government
- Website: www.belcoarts.com.au

The Belconnen Arts Centre is an arts facility in Canberra which opened in 2009. The facility is owned by the ACT government and managed by Belconnen Arts Centre Incorporated. The centre is operated by a small group of staff, with support from volunteers.

== Building ==
The Belconnen Arts Centre was designed by Williams Ross Architects and built by Project Coordination Australia P/L. The building is located on the waterfront of Lake Ginninderra next to the central business district of Belconnen.

In 2018, the Centre was expanded with dance studios, cafes, conference rooms, and an updated foreshore. The ACT government invested $15 million over three years to expand it. Work on-site began in December 2018; it was completed and officially reopened to the public in August 2020. The new wing includes a 400-seat black box theatre, additional exhibition space, resident company offices.

== Development of dance classes ==
The non-profit organisation, Dance for Parkinson's Australia, holds classes for people with Parkinson's at the Belconnen Art Centre. The project began in May 2013 in Sydney and at Queensland Ballet in Brisbane, expanding to Canberra in July of that year with support from Parkinson's ACT, the ACT Government's Inclusive Participation Funding Program, and IMB Foundation.

== See also ==
- List of museums in the Australian Capital Territory
