= Hawker, Australian Capital Territory =

Hawker
- Suburb
- Coordinates: 35°14′38″S 149°02′17″E
- Country: Australia
- State: Australian Capital Territory
- City: Canberra
- District: Belconnen
- Established: 1972

Government
  - Territory electorate: Ginninderra
  - Federal division: Canberra

Area
  - Total: 1.9 km^{2} (0.73 sq mi)

Population
  - Total: 3,008 (SAL 2021)
- Postcode: 2614
Suburbs around Hawker
| Higgins | Scullin | Page |
| | Hawker | Weetangera |

Hawker (/ˈhɔːkər/) (postcode: 2614) is a suburb of the Belconnen district of Canberra, located within the Australian Capital Territory, Australia.

The suburb of Hawker is named after Charles Hawker (1894–1938), Member of the House of Representatives from 1929 to 1938 and Federal minister in 1932. Streets in the suburb are named according to the theme of Northern Territory pastoral stations.

== Features and location ==
The centrepiece of the suburb is a group centre where there are many small businesses and shops like take aways, a newsagent, a motel, a hairdresser and a restaurant. The area supports three schools: Hawker Primary School, Belconnen High School and Hawker College (a specialist senior secondary school). Combined, these schools cover students from preschool to Year 12.

Hawker is a popular location for sport, and includes the multi-purpose Hawker Playing Fields; Hawker Enclosed Oval, a small football (soccer) stadium (Robertfam Park), centres for tennis and lawn bowls; and the Hawker International Softball Centre.

In 2016, the median weekly household income in Hawker of $2,028 were slightly below the ACT average of $2,070.

== Geology ==
Silurian age Green grey rhyodacite of the Walker Volcanics underlie the whole suburb. Off the south west of the suburb and south east of the Pinnacle is a lens of limestone and shale underneath the rhyodacite.
