= Cameron Offices =

Government offices in Australian Capital Territory, Australia

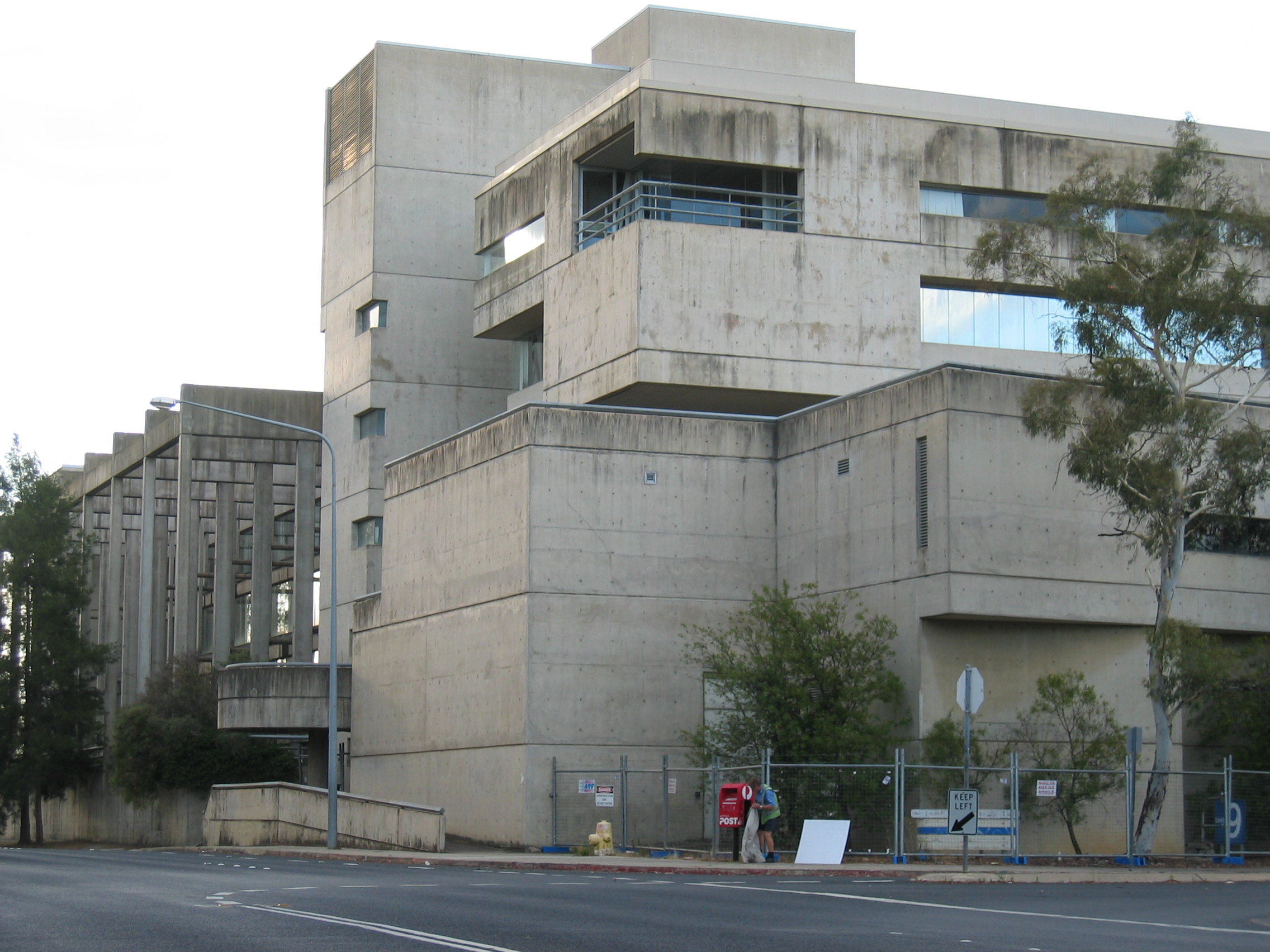
- Cameron Offices, 2006
- Alternative names: Government Office Complex Belconnen

General information
- Status: Partially demolished (Wings 1-2 and 6-10)
- Type: Government offices, student accommodation
- Architectural style: Brutalist structuralism
- Location: Belconnen, Canberra, Australian Capital Territory, Australia
- Coordinates: 35°14′31″S 149°4′11″E
- Current tenants: Commonwealth Superannuation Corporation; UniLodge
- Construction started: 1970
- Completed: 1976; 50 years ago
- Demolished: August 2007 (partial)
- Cost: A$16 million
- Client: National Capital Development Commission
- Owner: Bovis Lend Lease (since 2000)

Technical details
- Structural system: Precast and in situ concrete
- Floor area: 92,903 square metres (1,000,000 ft^{2})

Design and construction
- Architect: John Andrews
- Main contractor: T C Whittle Pty Ltd
- Designations: Union of International Architects Heritage register; Australian Institute of Architects register of significant Twentieth Century Australian buildings

Commonwealth Heritage List
- Official name: Cameron Offices (Wings 3, 4 and 5, and Bridge), Chandler St, Belconnen, ACT, Australia
- Type: Listed place
- Criteria: B., D., F., H.
- Designated: 22 August 2005
- Reference no.: 105410

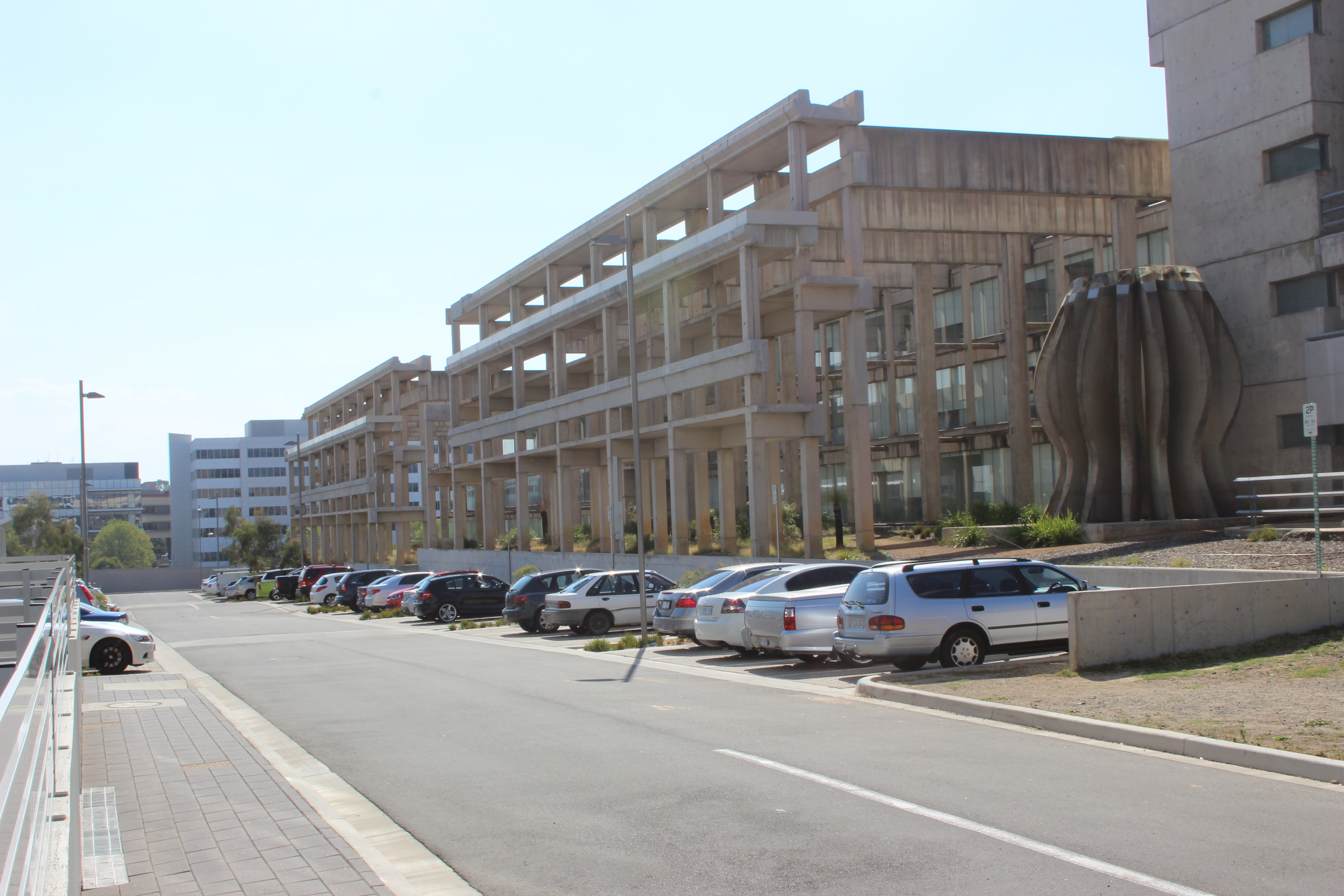
Cameron Offices Wing 5

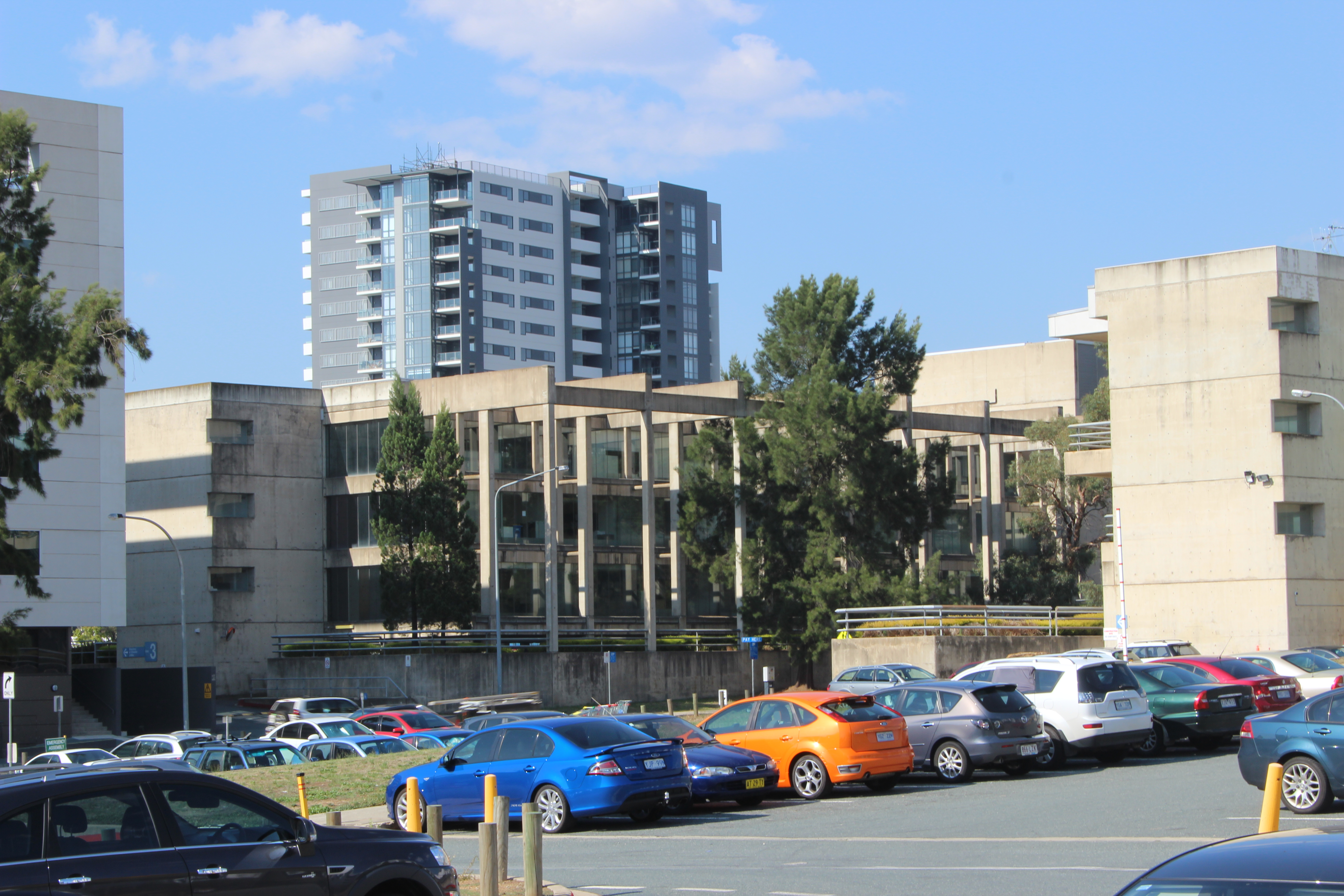
Cameron Offices Wing 3

The Cameron Offices are a group of former government offices commissioned by the National Capital Development Commission and designed by John Andrews in the brutalist structuralism style of architecture. The offices were constructed between 1970 and 1976 and partially demolished during 2007–08. They are located in the Belconnen Town Centre, which itself is located in the district of Belconnen in Canberra, Australian Capital Territory.

During their thirty-year lifespan, the primary occupant of the offices was the Australian Bureau of Statistics. Today, only three of the original nine wings (3, 4 and 5) and the pedestrian bridge remain. Wing 3 was previously occupied by Commonwealth Superannuation Corporation (CSC), the organisation responsible for providing superannuation products and services to government employees. Wings 4 and 5 have since been converted from government offices into student accommodation for the nearby University of Canberra.

== Design and construction ==
The Cameron Offices were the first major buildings to be built in Belconnen. They formed part of the original town plan, in which the aim was to provide a relatively compact pedestrian-oriented scheme on a north–south axis following the slope of the land from housing to the south through the office areas, transport interchange and shopping centre on to the man-made Lake Ginninderra, which was to have cultural buildings and housing along its shore.

Andrews was chosen by Sir John Overall of the National Capital Development Commission as the architect, mainly on the recommendation of Professor Gordon Stephenson. Andrews, who was a professor of architecture at the University of Toronto at the time, returned to Australia specifically to undertake the project. Andrews wished to create a truly Australian modern large-scale building suited to Australian conditions, something that he believed had not been achieved at that time. It was designed to accommodate approximately 4,000 public servants.

Built over a 2.4-hectare (6-acre) site, the complex was constructed with in-situ concrete – much of the Mall, and precast concrete (mostly post-tensioned) – the office wings, with precasting being done on site.

=== Heritage value ===
The design qualities of the Cameron Offices were recognised as significant at the time of their construction and won worldwide acclaim through a listing on the Union of International Architects Heritage register. The Cameron Offices are listed on the Australian Institute of Architects register of significant Twentieth Century Australian buildings.

In 2004 Cameron Offices were nominated for inclusion in the Commonwealth Heritage List. The Australian Heritage Council determined that while Cameron Offices did not meet threshold for the National Heritage List, the offices had Commonwealth Heritage values. The Minister for the Environment and Heritage determined that Wings 3, 4, 5 and the Bridge had Commonwealth Heritage values. The Minister determined that inclusion of Wings 3, 4, 5 and the Bridge in the Commonwealth Heritage List would not prevent the proposed demolition of the Wings 1, 2, 6, 7, 8 and 9. As a result, Wings 1, 2, 6, 7, 8 and 9 were not listed on the Commonwealth Heritage List.

In 1999 Cameron Offices were listed on the now defunct Register of the National Estate.

=== Criticism ===
The nature of the voids within the wings resulted in windtunnel effects, which combined with the buildings' concrete design to make them unpleasant to walk around, particularly in the winter. And the sprawling nature of the building made it tedious and slow for the inhabitants to walk between offices and meeting rooms for discussions with colleagues.

Due to these design elements, and the fact that Cameron Offices was staffed by public servants re-located from the more central government precinct in Parkes into what many saw as a back-water, the Cameron Offices were unpopular with many of the public servants who worked in the buildings.

In 1980, several newspapers published articles alleging that the buildings were leaky and inefficiently designed. They were successfully sued by the architects, on the grounds that the articles had impugned their professional competence. However, the accuracy or otherwise of the claims about the building were not resolved ( Andrews v John Fairfax & Sons Ltd [1980] 2 NSWLR 225)

Although located close to a bus interchange, the location of the Cameron Offices was criticised for being isolated by carparks and being too distant from the central shopping centre. The Belconnen shopping precinct was, originally, to be located immediately to the North of the offices and the Level 1 "Mall" on the offices terminated abruptly with a handrail in expectation that this Mall, which was also to cross College Street to the South and connect with medium-density housing there, would subsequently be built.

The Link to the South was never completed and the Belconnen Shopping precinct was subsequently "lifted" from the site to the North of the offices and buried, after extensive excavation still apparent today, into the Western side of Benjamin Way. This all but totally severed the offices from the shopping precinct and placed the office car parking between them and the shopping precinct.

== Partial decommission and redevelopment ==
In 1997 the Australian Government announced the elimination of 70,000 square metres (750,000 sq ft) of office space to stabilise and rejuvenate the commercial property market in Canberra, while removing surplus offices accommodation resulting from Commonwealth Public Service cuts. Cameron Offices was proposed for demolition. In 1998, the Department of Finance and Administration (DOFA) commissioned a conservation analysis of the building and also a separate study to investigate the partial demolition options. In 1998 DOFA issued a Call for Detailed Proposals to sell the property at market value, reduce vacant commercial office space and consider other objectives. The conservation analysis of the complex was completed in 1998 and the complex was entered in the Register of the National Estate in 1999. Several studies during 1999 examined possible refurbishment and reuse feasibility. DOFA advised the Australian Heritage Commission that there was no feasible and prudent alternative to partial demolition of Cameron Offices but that part of the building would be retained to allow the heritage values of the place to be interpreted.

In 2000, the building was sold to Bovis Lend Lease. Work on the demolition of Cameron Offices was due to commence in May 2002 with new buildings to be completed in 2005. In 2001, Andrews and Cameron Nominees (the owners of the buildings) investigated changes in the redevelopment strategy to permit retention of most of the significant elements including all buildings other than Wings 1 and 2, and the portion of the mall extending from Wing 3 to the bus interchange. This resulted in retention of most of the original building and the retention of the Optical Galaxy sculpture in its original location. Three major areas of change were recommended; the demolition of Wings 1 and 2, the partitioning of the open plan wings for apartments or small-scale commercial premises, and changes to the courtyards to provide the main address to each apartment.

From late 2005, the offices have been progressively decommissioned and redeveloped. Two of the wings were demolished in late 2006. By early 2008, all but three of the wings had either been completely demolished (those to the north), or demolition was well under way (those to the south). Wings 3, 4 and 5 and the pedestrian bridge over Cameron Avenue have been retained, and have had some cosmetic repair work done at the street-level entrances.

On 18 January 2008, a car parked outside of the safety fence was crushed when a section of the partly demolished building fell.

In 2010, Wing 5, which had remained vacant after the demolition of the other wings, was converted into student accommodation for the nearby University of Canberra.

In 2013, ComSuper combined their offices in Wings 3 and 4, into Wing 3. Between 2013 and 2014, the recently vacated Wing 4 was also converted into student accommodation.
