= Page, Australian Capital Territory =

Page
- Suburb
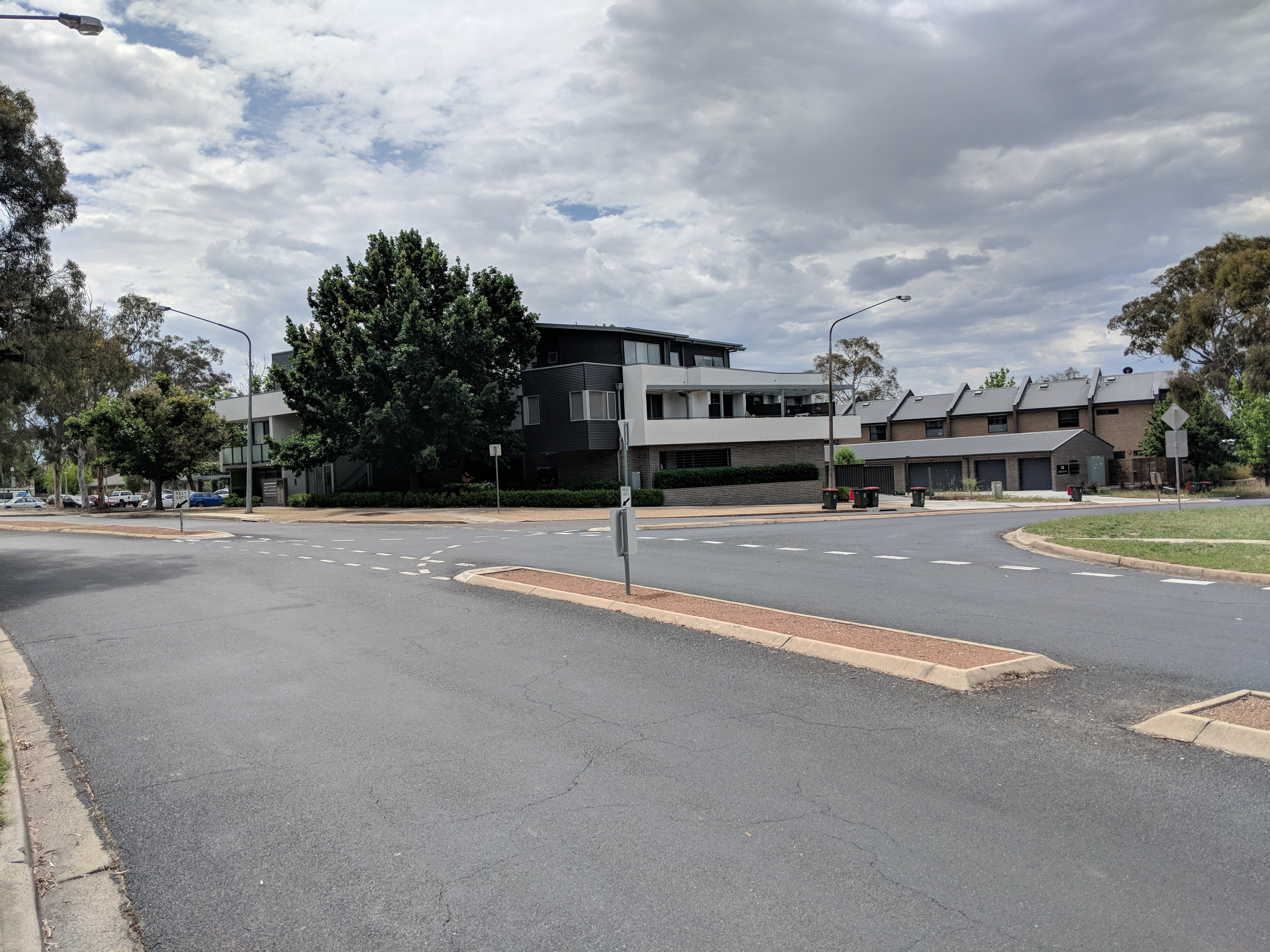
- New flats near Page shops

- Coordinates: 35°14′18″S 149°02′57″E
- Country: Australia
- State: Australian Capital Territory
- City: Canberra
- District: Belconnen

Government
  - Territory electorate: Ginninderra
  - Federal division: Fenner

Area
  - Total: 1.3 km^{2} (0.50 sq mi)

Population
  - Total: 3,054 (SAL 2021)
- Postcode: 2614
Suburbs around Page
| Florey | Florey | Belconnen |
| Scullin | Page | Belconnen |
| Hawker | Weetangera | Macquarie |

Page is a residential suburb in the Belconnen district of Canberra, located within the Australian Capital Territory, Australia. The suburb is named in honour of Sir Earle Page, a Prime Minister. Streets in Page are named in honour of Australian scientists. Page was established in 1968.

== Demography ==
As at the 2016 census, Page had a population of 3,025 people.

== Governance ==
For the purposes of Australian federal elections for the House of Representatives, Page is in the electoral division of Fenner.

For the purposes of Australian Capital Territory elections for the ACT Legislative Assembly, Page is in the Ginninderra electorate.

== Geology ==
Silurian age Green grey rhyodacite of the Walker Volcanics underlie the south and centre of the suburb. A lens of limestone is found just to the west of the centre of the suburb. The mid west has purple and green-grey dacite of the Walker Volcanics that was deposited before the rhyodacite. The north east has purple rhyodacite from the Deakin Volcanics. The Page north west has pink rhyolite from the Deakin Volcanics.
