= Higgins, Australian Capital Territory =

Higgins
- Suburb
- Coordinates: 35°13′56″S 149°01′38″E
- Country: Australia
- State: Australian Capital Territory
- City: Canberra
- District: Belconnen
- Established: 1969

Government
  - Territory electorate: Ginninderra
  - Federal division: Fenner

Area
  - Total: 1.7 km^{2} (0.66 sq mi)

Population
  - Total: 3,321 (SAL 2021)
- Postcode: 2615
Suburbs around Higgins
| Holt | Latham | Florey |
| Holt | Higgins | Scullin |
| | | Hawker |

Higgins is a suburb in the Belconnen district of Canberra, in the Australian Capital Territory, Australia. The suburb is named after politician and judge Henry Bournes Higgins (1851–1929). It was gazetted on 6 June 1968. The streets of Higgins are named after judges.

Higgins had two government-run schools, Higgins Primary and Higgins Preschool (both now closed). The supermarket, built by Philippos Christodoulou, Tom and Tim Efkarpidis in 1968 was, by 2024, reported to be abandoned.

== Governance ==
For Australian federal elections for the House of Representatives, Higgins is in the Fenner.

For Australian Capital Territory elections for the ACT Legislative Assembly, Higgins is in the Ginninderra electorate.

== Geology ==
Rocks in Higgins are from the Silurian age. Green grey rhyodacite of the Walker Volcanics underlie the south and centre of the suburb. North of centre is purple and green-grey dacite of the Walker Volcanics that was deposited before the rhyodacite. Purple pink rhyolite is found in the north east. In the north west is purple and green tuff.
