= Belconnen, Australian Capital Territory =

Belconnen
- Suburb
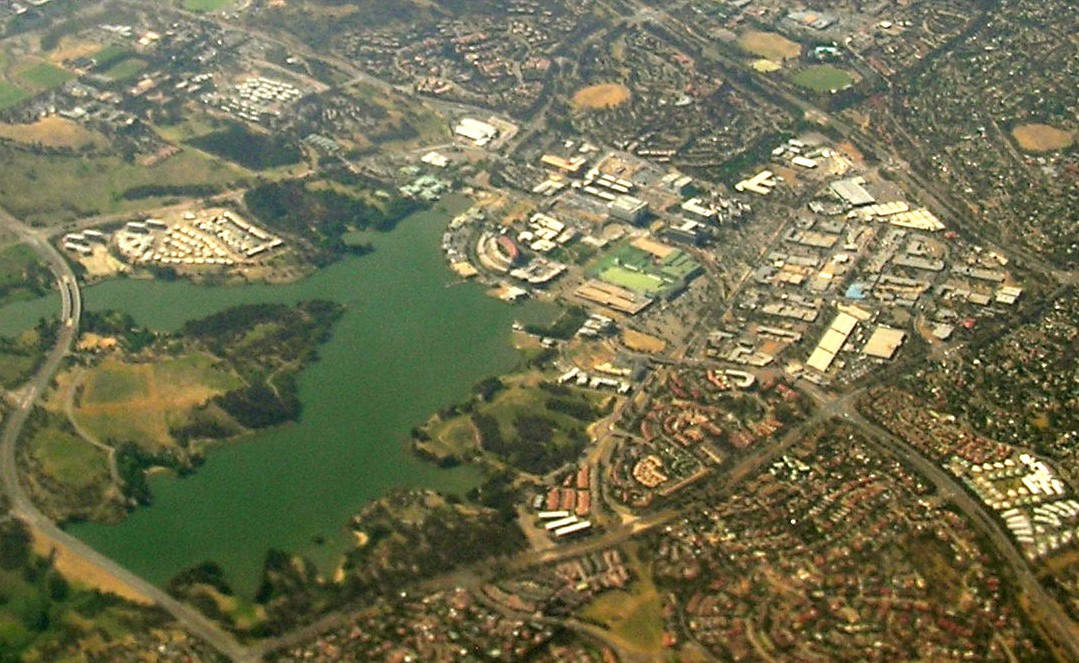
- Aerial view of Belconnen Town Centre and Lake Ginninderra from the west, 2009

- Coordinates: 35°14′13″S 149°03′54″E
- Country: Australia
- State: Australian Capital Territory
- City: Canberra
- District: Belconnen
- Location: 10 km (6.2 mi) WNW of Canberra CBD; 27 km (17 mi) WNW of Queanbeyan; 94 km (58 mi) SW of Goulburn; 291 km (181 mi) SW of Sydney
- Established: 1983

Government
  - Territory electorate: Ginninderra
  - Federal divisions: Fenner; Canberra

Area
  - Total: 4.4 km^{2} (1.7 sq mi)
- Elevation: 594 m (1,949 ft)

Population
  - Total: 8,502 (2021 census)
  - Density: 1,932/km^{2} (5,000/sq mi)
- Postcode: 2617
Suburbs around Belconnen
Evatt	McKellar	Lawson
Florey	Belconnen	Bruce
Page	Macquarie	Aranda

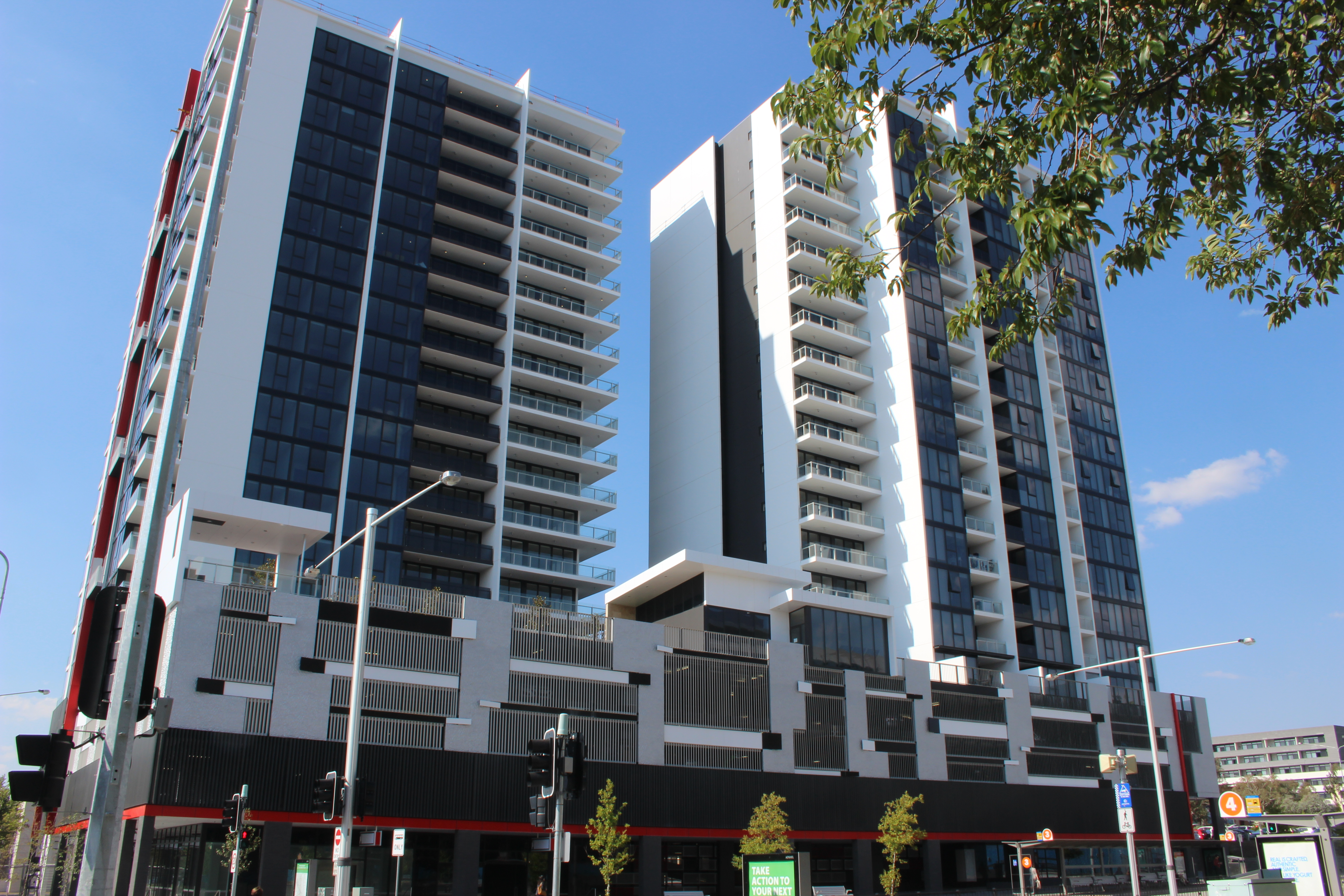
Sentinel apartments

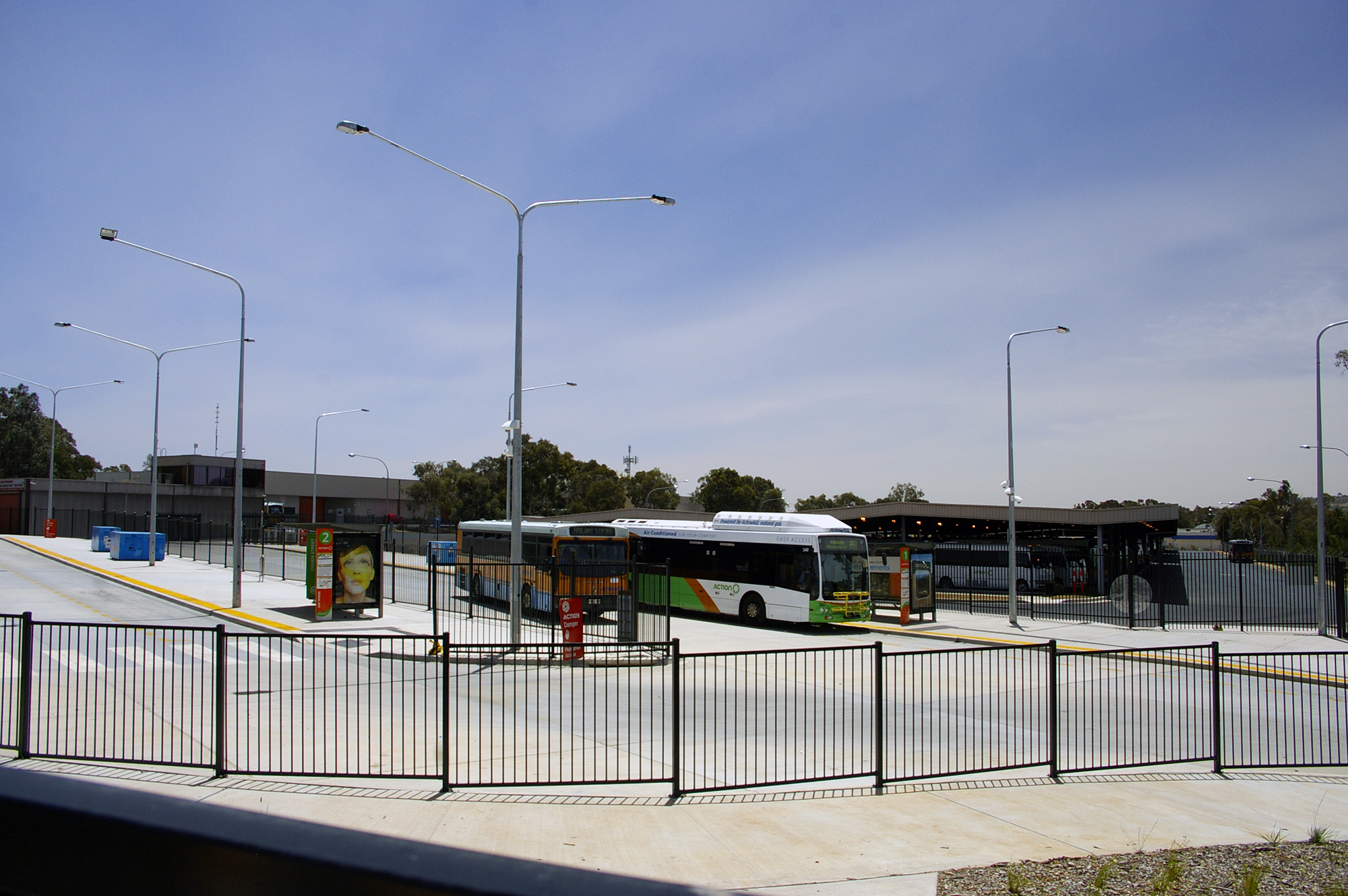
Cohen Street Bus Station

Belconnen (postcode: 2617) is the most inner suburb of the larger district of Belconnen in Canberra, Australia. Sharing its name with the larger district which encapsulates it, the suburb is surrounded with well developed infrastructure, and planning which allows it sunset views from the Brindabellas on its western side. The suburb contains important amenities for the District of Belconnen including the Belconnen Town Centre and Lake Ginninderra as well as its own well populated residential areas. It is bounded by Ginninderra Drive, Aikman Drive, Eastern Valley Way, Belconnen Way and Coulter Drive. It has a number of parks such as Margaret Timpson Park, (within the town centre) Eastern Valley Oval (on the lower slope of Emu Ridge) and on the foreshores of Lake Ginninberra, Diddams Close Park and John Knight Memorial Park.

The name Belconnen has been associated with the district since the days of the early settlers. In the city of Canberra, suburbs are assigned street names that reflect a distinct sub-group of cultural or historical Australian significance. The streets in the suburb of Belconnen are named for Lord Mayors and Mayors.

== Features and location ==
Belconnen Town Centre is the major commercial centre for the Canberra district of Belconnen and is located in the suburb of Belconnen. Belconnen Town Centre includes the region's major shopping centre, Westfield Belconnen (known as Belconnen Mall), large government office buildings including the immigration and citizenship division of the Department of Home Affairs and the Australian Bureau of Statistics, as well as three bus stations. It also includes the Cameron Offices, once a major office building, but now mostly demolished.

The service and trades area is located in the suburb's west. In this area can be found car dealers and repairers, petrol stations, hardware stores, restaurants and many other specialty retailers.

UC Senior Secondary College Lake Ginninderra, a secondary college for years 11 and 12, is located on Emu Bank, on the south-eastern shore of Lake Ginninderra.

The Belconnen Arts Centre is on Emu Bank, on the southern shore of Lake Ginninderra.

== Residential areas ==
Belconnen includes residential development areas, "Emu Ridge" in the south-east, "Ginninderra Heights" in the north-west and apartment buildings in Chandler and Beissel Streets.

=== Emu Ridge ===
Emu Ridge is bounded by Benjamin Way, College Street, Eastern Valley Way and Belconnen Way; Hennessy Street and Condell Street are the two main thoroughfares, with many cul-de-sacs off these. Emu Ridge consists solely of low to medium-density housing. Emu Ridge is often regarded as a suburb, mainly due to its distinct boundaries and because the name helps differentiate this part of the suburb from other parts of the suburb.

=== Ginninderra Heights ===
Ginninderra Heights was the name given to the medium-density residential development centred on Totterdell Street in the north-west of Belconnen.

== Demographics ==
At the 2022 census, the population of Belconnen was 8,502, an increase from 4,437 in 2011 and 2,826 in 2001, including 1.5% Indigenous persons. 45.2% of people were born in Australia. The next most common countries of birth were China (excluding SARs and Taiwan, 11.1%), India (6.2%), Nepal (5.7%) and the Philippines (2.4%). 48.5% of people spoke only English at home. Other languages spoken at home included Mandarin (11.6%), Nepali (5.5%), Cantonese (1.9%), Vietnamese (1.7%) and Korean (1.7%). The most common responses for religion were No Religion (45.5%), Catholic (11.9%) and Hinduism (9.9%). 74.9% of dwellings were units or apartments and 24.7% were semi-detached, row or terrace house or townhouses.

== Governance ==
For the purposes of Australian federal elections for the House of Representatives, Belconnen is in the divisions of Fenner and Canberra.

For the purposes of Australian Capital Territory elections for the ACT Legislative Assembly, Belconnen is in the Ginninderra electorate.

== Geology ==
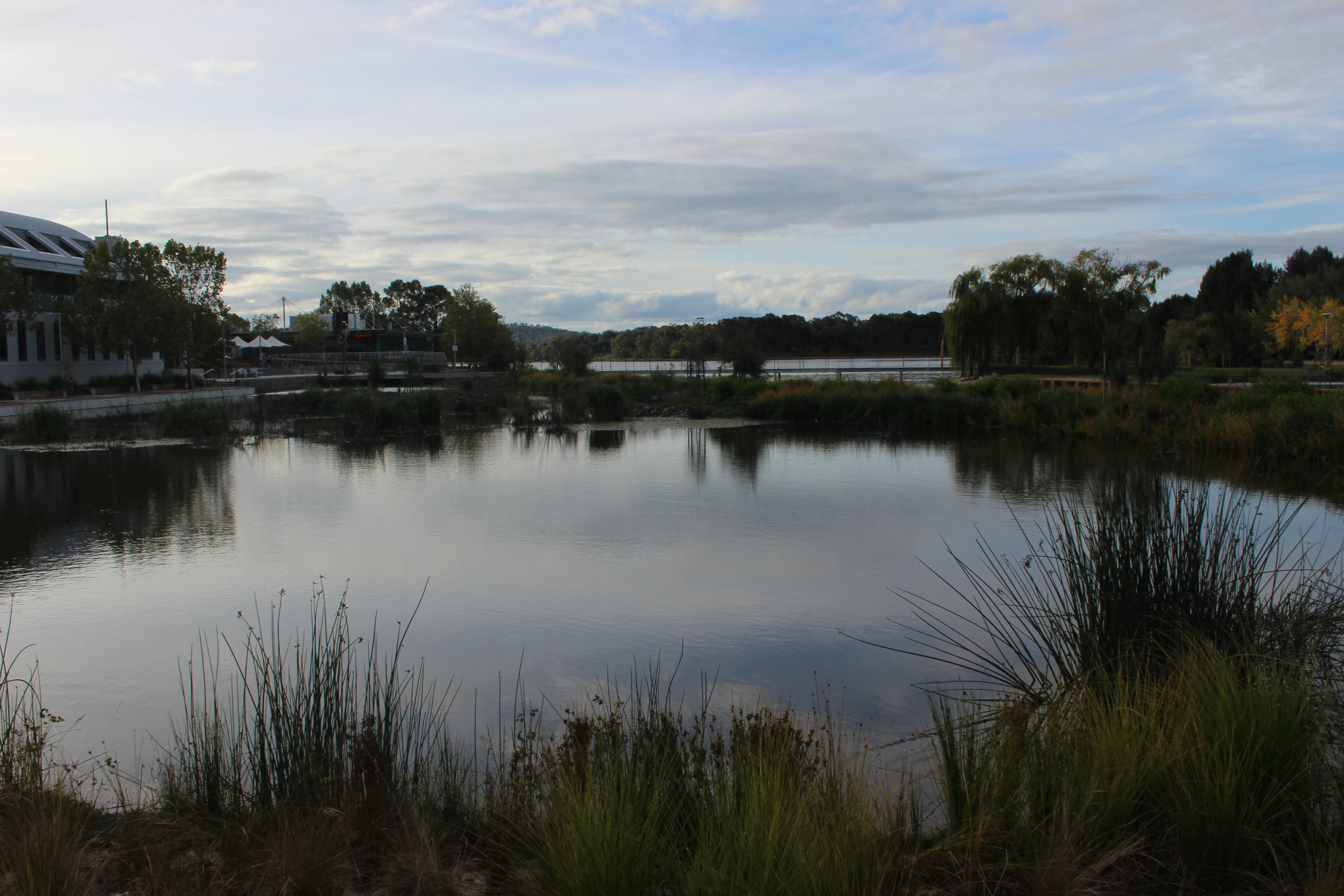
Lake Ginninderra adjacent to Belconnen Town Centre

Belconnen has the highest density of different kinds of rocks outcropping of any Canberra suburb. It is at the intersection of two faults that form an X shape across Canberra. These are the Deakin Fault and the Winslade Fault. Green grey rhyodacite of the Walker Volcanics is in the south along Belconnen Way. Deakin Volcanics purple rhyodacite is around the north end of Josephson St. Deakin Volcanics green grey and purple rhyodacite goes east from Lathlain Dr to Chandler St. Grey green dacite and quartz andesite Hawkins Volcanics is in a strip from the north west corner heading south east between two branches of the Deakin fault to around Chandler St and Hennessey St. A porphyry of Green-grey Dacitic intrusive containing large white Feldspar crystals is west of Eastern Valley Way and in between the two arms of Lake Ginninderra. Glebe Farm Adamellite intrusion is found to the south and east of Lake Ginninderra. Ordovician Pittman Formation greywacke is in the extreme south east and far north east of the town centre. Calcareous Shale from the Yass Subgroup is to the west of Lake Ginninderra. Dark grey and black laminated shale from the Acton Shale member is found on the west side of the Diddams Close Park in between the two arms of the lake.
