= Ginninderra Creek =

Coordinates: 35°13′S 149°3′E

Ginninderra Creek Ginninderry Creek, Ginninginninderry Creek, Gingininderra Creek
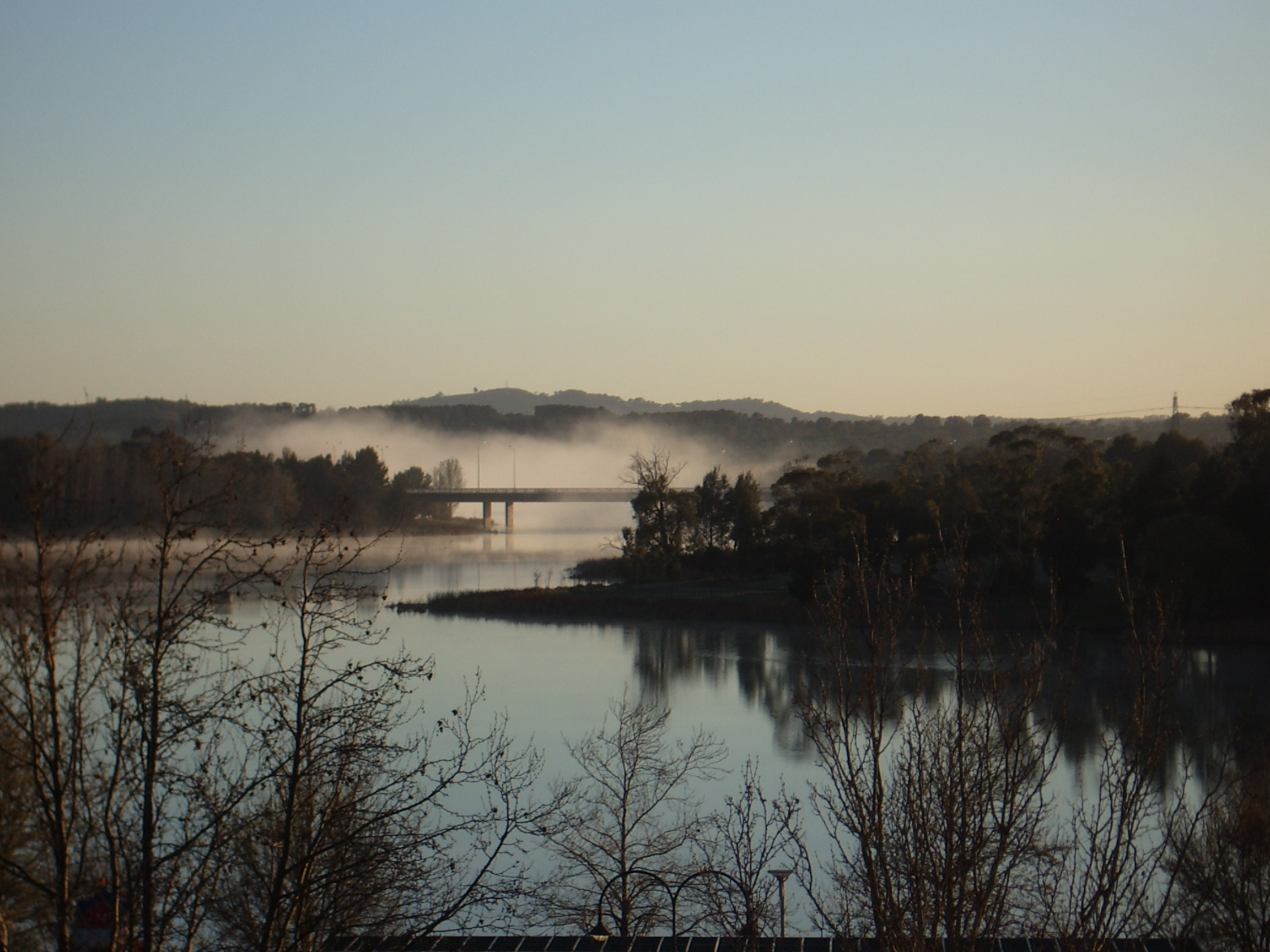
- Ginninderra Creek, impounded at Lake Ginninderra, 2011
- Etymology: Aboriginal: word meaning "sparkling" or "throwing little rays of light"

Location
- Country: Australia
- State/Territory: Australian Capital Territory; New South Wales
- IBRA: South Eastern Highlands
- District: Capital Country
- Town centres: Gungahlin; Belconnen

Physical characteristics
- Source: Spring Range
  - location: north-east of Hall, ACT
  - elevation: 599 m (1,965 ft)
- Mouth: confluence with Murrumbidgee River
  - location: Ginninderra Gorge, Yass Valley, NSW
  - elevation: 430 m (1,410 ft)
- Length: 23 km (14 mi)

Basin features
- River system: Murrumbidgee River, Murray–Darling basin
- Reservoirs: Gungahlin Pond, Lake Ginninderra

Ginninderra Creek, a partly perennial stream of the Murrumbidgee catchment within the Murray–Darling basin, is located in the Capital Country region spanning both the Australian Capital Territory and New South Wales, Australia.

Ginninderra is derived from the Aboriginal word, meaning "sparkling" or "throwing little rays of light". The traditional custodians of the land surrounding Ginninderra Creek are the Aboriginal people of the Ngunnawal tribe.

== Course ==
Ginninderra Creek rises on the northern border between the Australian Capital Territory (ACT) and New South Wales (NSW), sourced from the Spring Range, located north-east of Hall. The creek flows generally south-west across the Ginninderra Plain, through the Gungahlin and Belconnen regions in Canberra, and then heads west crossing the western border between the ACT and flowing into NSW, towards its confluence with the Murrumbidgee River. The creek descends 168 metres (551 ft) over its 23 kilometres (14 mi) course.

Ginninderra Creek is impounded by Gungahlin Pond and Lake Ginninderra, a man-made lake that was constructed in 1974 to act as a sedimentation pond. The creek flows over the Ginninderra Falls, descending 41 metres (135 ft), and through Ginninderra Gorge, to its confluence with the Murrumbidgee River.

The catchment of Ginninderra Creek covers approximately 32,000 hectares (79,000 acres).

The Ginninderra Creek catchment carries approximately a quarter of Canberra's urban runoff, and there is considerable risk of runoff from urban areas harming aquatic ecosystems in the Murrumbidgee River system.

== Recreation ==
Ginninderra Falls was a popular scenic tourist destination, opened initially as a private tourist park from the late 1990s. John Gale argued that the Ginninderra Falls were so pretty that Canberra should be chosen as the capital city of Australia, rather than the proposal to choose Dalgety as the location for the national capital. From mid-2011 onwards, advocacy began for the establishment of a national park containing the Ginninderra Falls, comprising 900 hectares (2,200 acres) and covering both ACT and NSW, inclusive of the existing 200 hectares (490 acres) Woodstock Nature Reserve in the ACT.
