= Westfield Belconnen =

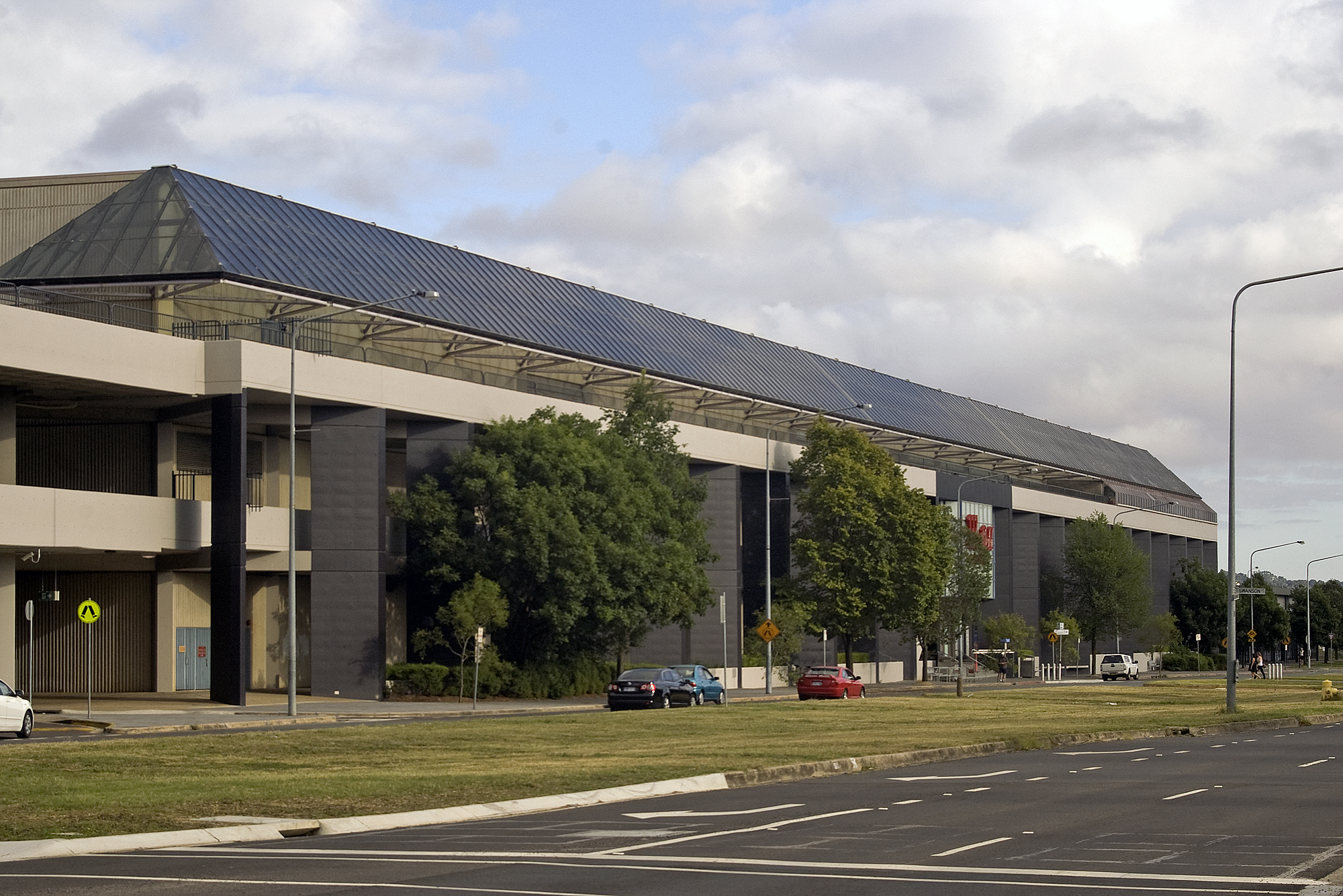
- viewed from Benjamin Way
- Location: Benjamin Way, Belconnen
- Coordinates: 35°14′18″S 149°03′54″E
- Opened: 28 February 1978
- Manager: Scentre Group
- Owner: Scentre Group
- Num. of stores: 268
- Floor area: 96,008 m^{2}
- Floors: 3
- Parking: 2,880 spaces
- Website: westfield.com.au/belconnen

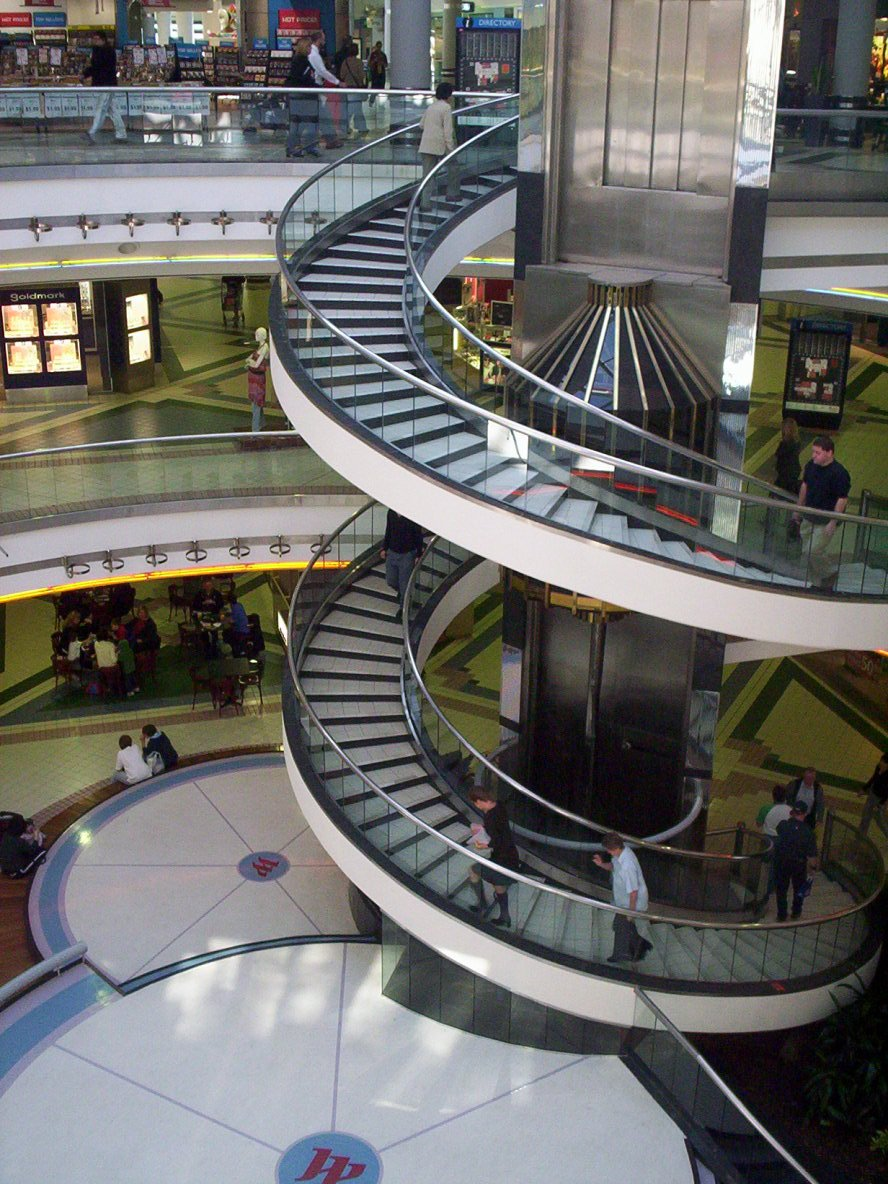
Westfield Belconnen centre court – the lift in the picture has been replaced also the stage has been removed.

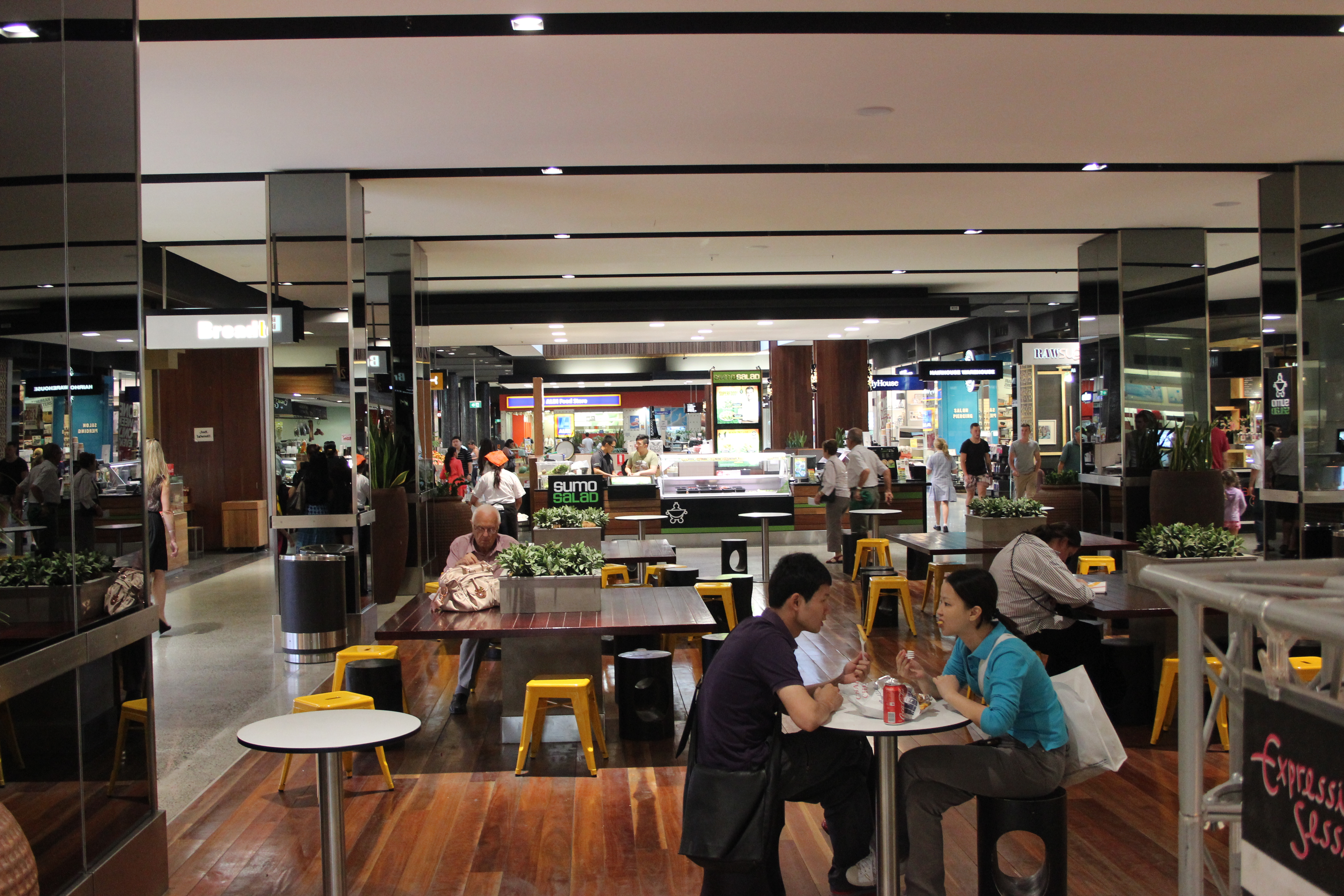
Middle level food court

Westfield Belconnen, also known colloquially as Belconnen (or Belco) Mall, is managed by Scentre Group and located in the Canberra suburb of Belconnen, Australia. The shopping centre is the largest in Canberra, featuring around 270 specialty stores.

== History ==
December 1975: The bulk earthworks on the site for the Belconnen Mall were commenced.

September 1976: Construction of the $24 million Belconnen Mall commenced for the Canberra Commercial Development Authority.

August 1977: The final concrete was poured in stage 1 of the Belconnen Mall construction.

February 1978: First day of trading following the completion of stage 1 construction and the initial fit out of the Belconnen Mall. The Mall was designed by Cameron, Chisholm & Nicol and built by the joint venture partnership of T. H. O’Connor Pty. Ltd. and Costain Australia Limited for the Canberra Commercial Development Authority and was irreverently referred to as "Pead's Palace".

July 1978: Stage 2 of the Belconnen Mall; featuring the “Centre Stage area”, a spiral staircase, a 23-person glass lift and an additional 60 traders was opened.

October 1978: With the final stage of the initial Belconnen Mall construction completed, the centre was officially opened by the Minister for the Capital Territory, Robert James (Bob) Ellicott. The Belconnen Mall was branded as "The Big One" as at the time it was the largest shopping centre in the Southern Hemisphere, complete with the second largest Myer Department Store in the world. Belconnen Mall boasts Canberra's first Travelators (in lieu of escalators), Canberra's first multi-storey car parks and is a favourable design of the decade.

1980: An integral link in the elevated pedestrian network between the bus interchange and Belconnen Mall, the Belconnen Churches Centre on the corner of Benjamin Way and Joynton Smith Drive was completed.

December 1985: An agreement was reached between the Commonwealth Government, the Canberra Commercial Development Authority and a prospective purchaser for the sale of the Belconnen Mall.

February–March 1986: The Minister for Territories, Gordon Glen Denton Scholes, by notice in the Commonwealth gazette of this date, abolished the Canberra Commercial Development Authority (operators of the Belconnen Mall).

The Commonwealth Government completed the 87 million dollar sale, agreed to in December 1985, of the Belconnen Mall to the joint venture partnership of the Commonwealth Superannuation Fund Investment Trust and the Westfield Trust (Westfield Property Group).

1989: Refurbishment of Westfield Shoppingtown (the former Belconnen Mall) commenced.

May 1995: The Westfield Shoppingtown (formerly the Belconnen Mall) commenced construction of a $14 million entertainment complex including a ten-screen cinema complex, interactive indoor games site (Intencity), variety stores and restaurants.

2009: Construction begins on the replacement of the mall's original Travelators.

2009: Expansion of the mall has begun.

2010: Westfield expansion of Fresh Food opens along with the Yellow car park

31 March 2011: Unveiling of the "Beautiful new Belconnen" – major refurbishments in the existing centre and opening of new stores including a Target discount department store.

== Canberra Commercial Development Authority ==
Canberra Commercial Development Authority

Authority overview
- Formed: October 1974
- Dissolved: 27 February 1986
- Jurisdiction: ACT Government
- Minister responsible: Hon. Gordon Scholes AO, Minister for Territories
- Authority executives: Jim Pead, Chairman; David Elsworth, Deputy Chairman

The CCDA was an authority formed in October 1974 for the purpose of developing and managing the proposed Belconnen Mall. At the time Canberra had two major shopping centres, namely the Monaro Mall, and the Woden Town Centre, and it was decided that the north of Canberra needed a similar shopping centre. Rather than utilising private industry to build the mall, it was decided that the government should operate it to prevent the formation of monopolies.

Shortly after the opening of the mall in 1978, it was identified in a review of Commonwealth Functions conducted by Minister for Industry and Commerce Phillip Lynch as a potential privatisation target, and it was announced by Prime Minister Malcolm Fraser that the authority would be abolished and the mall sold. This, however, did not happen for many years due to the government's dissatisfaction with the offers it had received. Furthermore in 1983 there was a suggestion that the authorities responsibilities would be widened to include a new shopping centre development in Erindale. This never came to fruition, and a bid for the mall was accepted in 1985, with the authority being abolished the next year. The mall was bought for A$87 million by a joint venture between Westfield and the Commonwealth Superannuation Fund Investment Trust.
