= Lake Ginninderra =

Dam on the Ginninderra Creek in Canberra, Australia

Ginninderra Dam
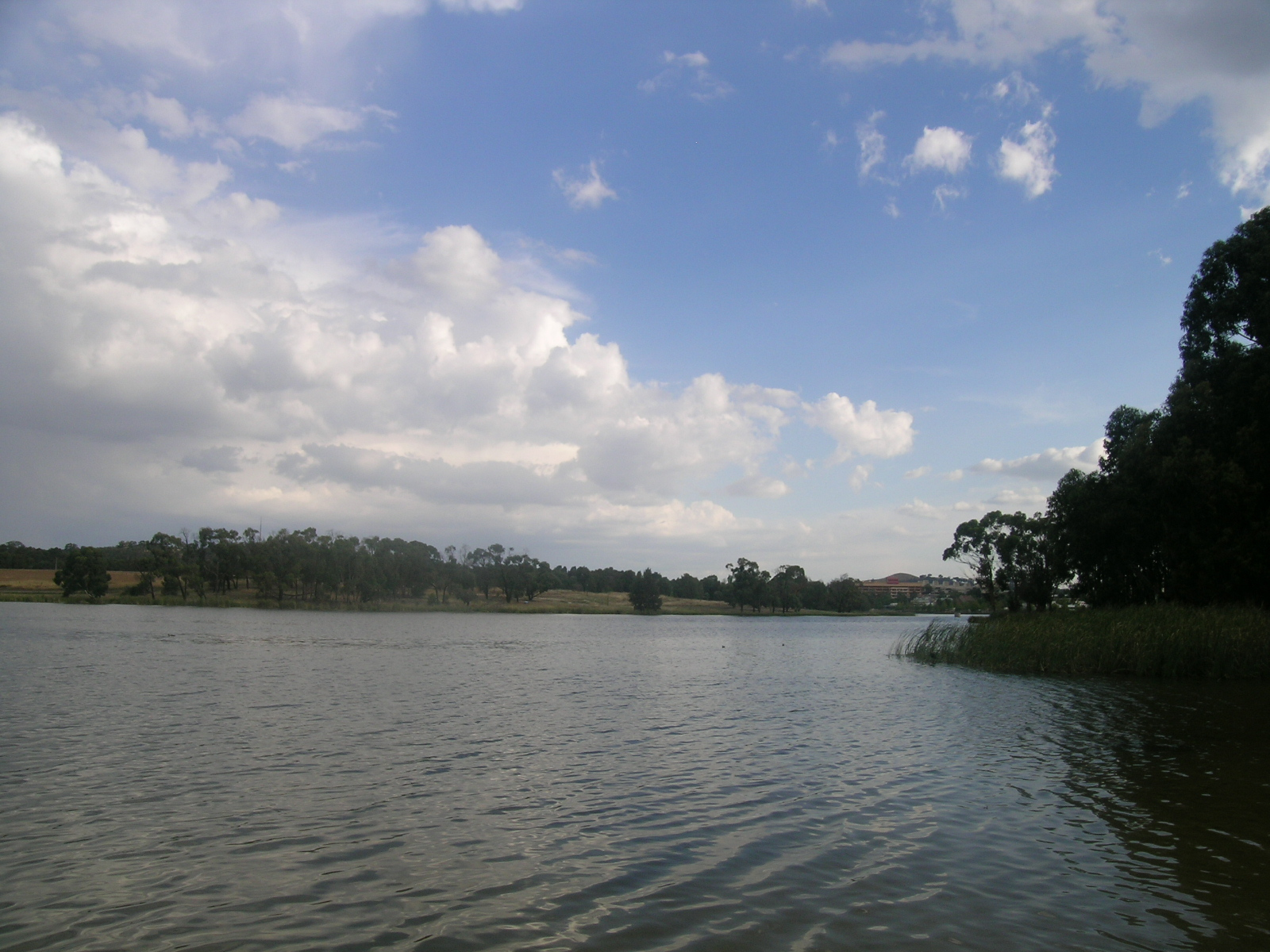
- The lake in 2006

- Location of the lake in the ACT
- Interactive map of Ginninderra Dam
- Country: Australia
- Location: Belconnen, Canberra, Australian Capital Territory
- Coordinates: 35°14′S 149°04′E
- Purpose: Recreation
- Status: Operational
- Opening date: 1975
- Built by: Thiess Bros

Dam and spillways
- Type of dam: Earth fill dam
- Impounds: Ginninderra Creek
- Height (foundation): 17 m (56 ft)
- Length: 365 m (1,198 ft)
- Elevation at crest: 582.83 m (1,912.2 ft) AHD
- Dam volume: 174×10^{3} m^{3} (6.1×10^{6} cu ft)
- Spillway type: Uncontrolled
- Spillway capacity: 965 m^{3}/s (34,100 cu ft/s)

Reservoir
- Creates: Lake Ginninderra
- Total capacity: 3,700 ML (3,000 acre⋅ft)
- Catchment area: 98.8 km^{2} (38.1 sq mi)
- Surface area: 105 ha (260 acres)
- Maximum water depth: 12 m (40 ft)
- Normal elevation: 577 m (1,893 ft) AHD

Lake Ginninderra is a reservoir formed by the Ginninderra Dam, an earth-filled embankment dam across Ginninderra Creek, located adjacent to the Belconnen Town Centre, in Canberra, in the Australian Capital Territory.

== Overview ==
The National Capital Development Commission announced news of the dam in 1972. The dam was constructed in 1974 to collect stormwater discharge from a 98.8-square-kilometre (38.1 sq mi) catchment area that includes the surrounding suburbs of Aranda, Macquarie, Cook, Bruce, Belconnen, McKellar, Giralang, Kaleen in the eastern areas of Belconnen.

The dam's earthen wall is 17 metres (56 ft) high and 365 metres (1,198 ft) long. The embankment was formed through the construction of Ginninderra Drive and the resultant reservoir has a maximum capacity of 3,700 megalitres (3,000 acre⋅ft) when full, covering a surface area of 105 hectares (260 acres) and an average depth of 3.5 metres (11 ft). Water flow out of the lake is via a multi-celled concrete culvert structure and uncontrolled spillway chute on the Ginninderra Drive embankment that can handles flow of 965 cubic metres per second (34,100 cu ft/s).

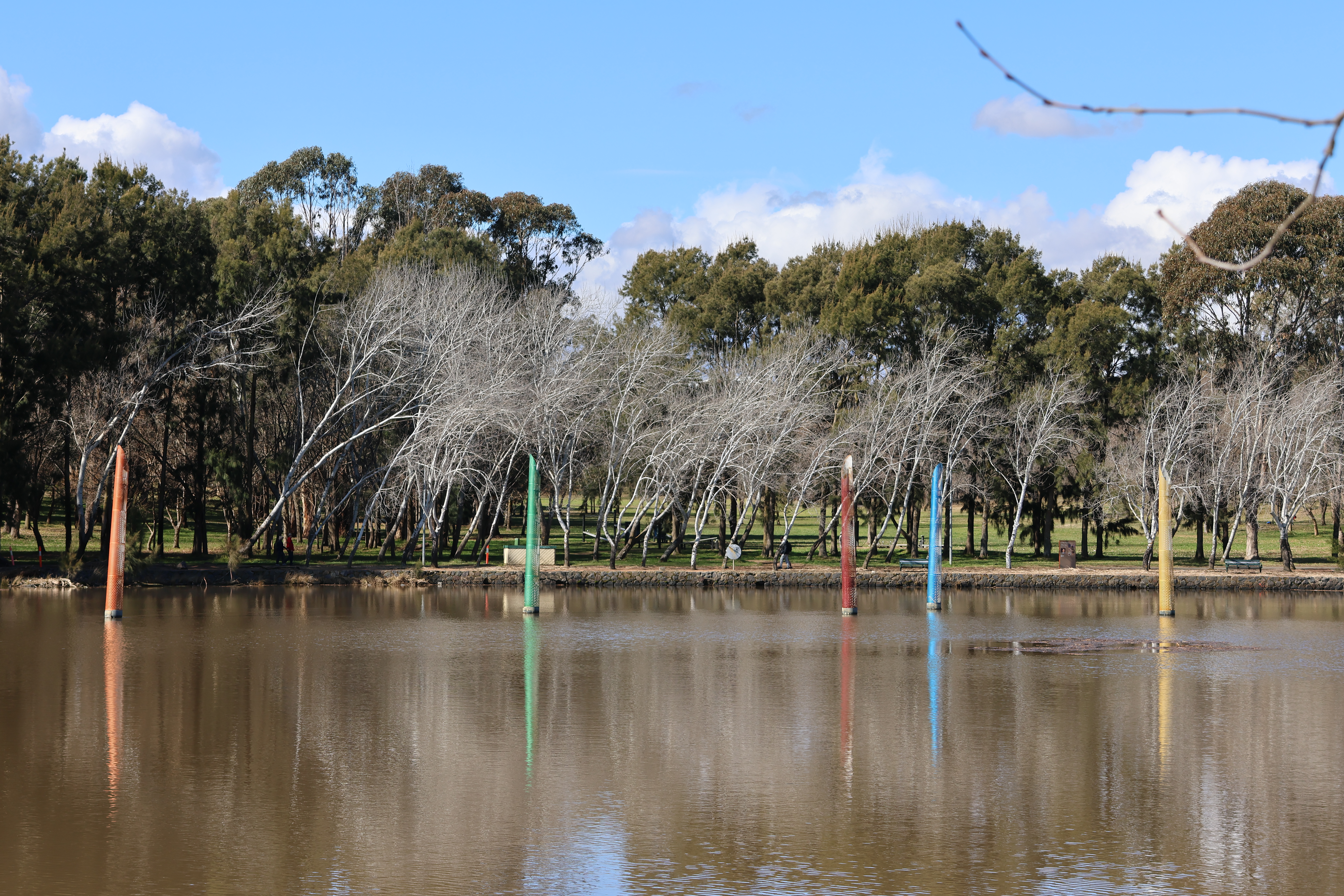
Lake Ginninderra Running Lights - kinetic sound art sculpture

During 2004 the Ginninderra Drive embankment was raised by one metre (three point three feet). The earthen embankments on the Coulter Drive side of the lake were raised as well.

The lake is home to wildlife, including Black swans, moorhens, ducks and the Rakali.

The Belconnen Arts Centre and the Lake Ginninderra Sea Scouts are located on the southern shore of the lake.

== See also ==
- List of dams and reservoirs in the Australian Capital Territory
