= Belconnen Town Centre =

Coordinates: 35°14′19″S 149°04′06″E

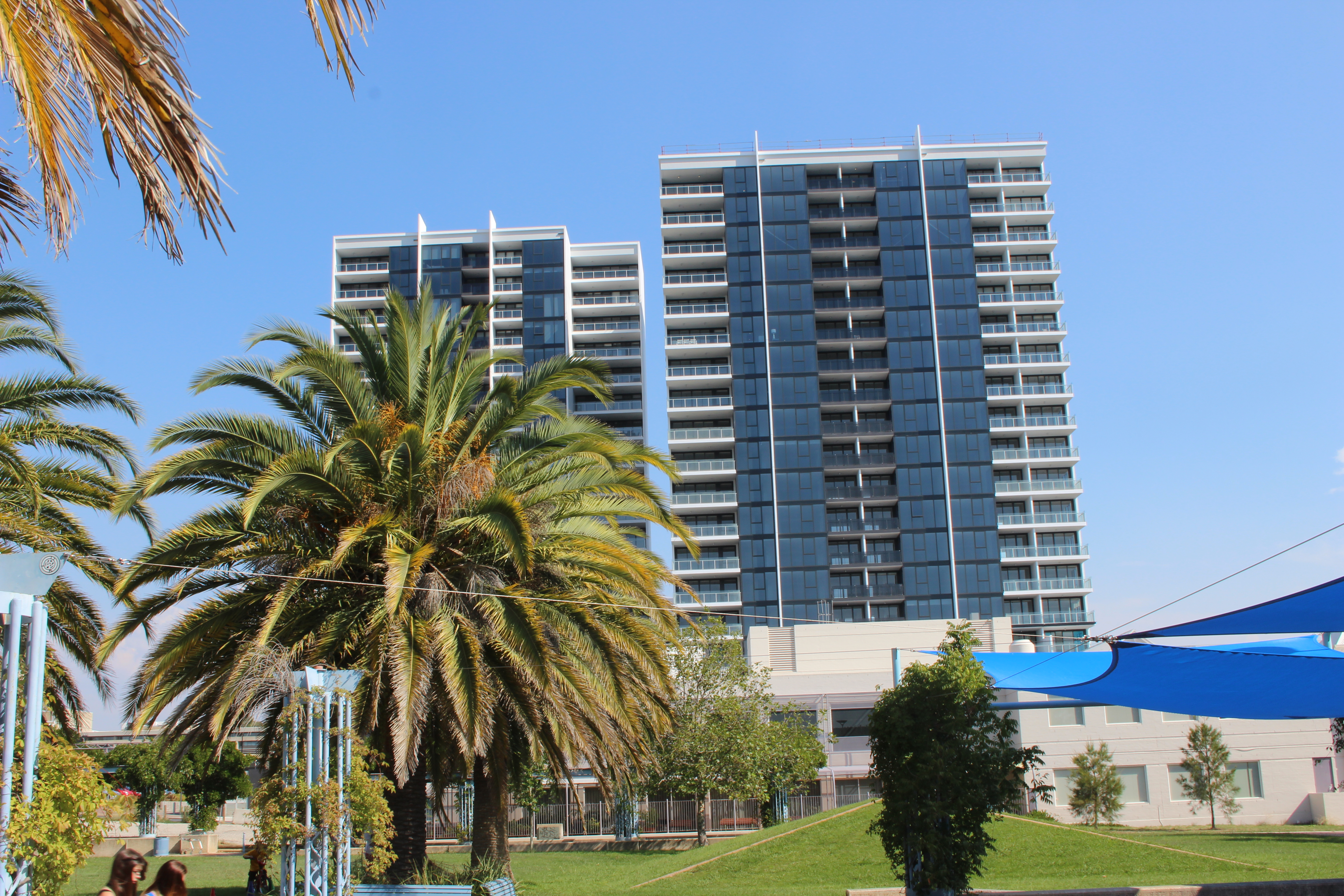
- Margaret Timpson Park and Sentinel apartments, Belconnen
- Country: Australia
- State: Australian Capital Territory
- City: Canberra
- District: Belconnen

Government
  - Territory electorate: Ginninderra
  - Federal division: Fenner

Belconnen Town Centre is the town centre of the district of Belconnen in the Australian Capital Territory. Is located on the south-western shore of Lake Ginninderra.

Belconnen Town Centre contains several Federal and Territory government departments, as well as retail and commercial facilities. A large Westfield shopping mall is located within the centre as are many other smaller retail outlets including the Capital Food Market. The centre also contains several car dealerships. Residential apartments are located within the centre as well as in the surrounding parts of the suburb of Belconnen. The centre also contains a public library, health centre, town park, community facilities and a bus interchange. Belconnen Town Centre also offers events to local residents

Government departments have been housed in office buildings in the centre including the (now demolished) Benjamin Offices and the award-winning Cameron Offices - an example of brutalist architecture. These departments have included the Department of Immigration and Border Protection, the Australian Bureau of Statistics (now in the nearby ABS House) and the Australian Communications and Media Authority.
