= List of Philobota species =

These species of concealer moths belong to the genus Philobota.

== Philobota species ==
- Philobota abductella (Walker, 1864)
- Philobota aceraea (Meyrick, 1883)
- Philobota acerba (Turner, 1939)
- Philobota achranta (Turner, 1917)
- Philobota acompsa (Turner, 1939)
- Philobota acropola Meyrick, 1884
- Philobota actias (Lower, 1899)
- Philobota aedophanes Turner, 1944
- Philobota aethalea (Meyrick, 1883)
- Philobota agnesella (Newman, 1856)
- Philobota agrapha Turner, 1917
- Philobota amblopis Turner, 1944
- Philobota amblys Turner, 1944
- Philobota ameles Turner, 1944
- Philobota ancylotoxa Meyrick, 1884
- Philobota angustella (Walker, 1864)
- Philobota apora (Meyrick, 1883)
- Philobota arabella (Newman, 1856)
- Philobota archepeda (Meyrick, 1888)
- Philobota argotoxa Meyrick, 1889
- Philobota asemantica (Turner, 1944)
- Philobota atmobola Meyrick, 1884
- Philobota atmopis (Meyrick, 1889)
- Philobota atrisignis (Lower, 1900)
- Philobota austalea (Meyrick, 1884)
- Philobota auxolyca Meyrick, 1889
- Philobota baryptera (Turner, 1896)
- Philobota barysoma (Meyrick, 1883)
- Philobota basicapna (Turner, 1937)
- Philobota basiphaia Common, 1996
- Philobota bathrogramma (Turner, 1916)
- Philobota bathrophaea (Turner, 1914)
- Philobota biophora Meyrick, 1884
- Philobota brachystoma (Meyrick, 1915)
- Philobota byrsochra (Meyrick, 1915)
- Philobota calamaea Meyrick, 1884
- Philobota callistis (Meyrick, 1889)
- Philobota candida (Turner, 1898)
- Philobota capnonota (Turner, 1938)
- Philobota carinaria Meyrick, 1913
- Philobota catharopa Turner, 1944
- Philobota celaenopa (Turner, 1936)
- Philobota centromita Turner, 1944
- Philobota cephalochrysa (Lower, 1894)
- Philobota chionoptera Meyrick, 1884
- Philobota chlorella (Meyrick, 1883)
- Philobota chrysopotama Meyrick, 1884
- Philobota cirrhocephala (Turner, 1917)
- Philobota cirrhopepla (Turner, 1916)
- Philobota clastosticha (Turner, 1939)
- Philobota cnecopasta (Turner, 1937)
- Philobota comarcha (Meyrick, 1920)
- Philobota cosmocrates Meyrick, 1889
- Philobota crassinervis (Lower, 1900)
- Philobota cretacea Meyrick, 1884
- Philobota crocopleura Turner, 1944
- Philobota crossoxantha (Lower, 1907)
- Philobota crypsichola Meyrick, 1884
- Philobota cryptea (Turner, 1938)
- Philobota curvilinea (Turner, 1896)
- Philobota cyphocentra (Meyrick, 1922)
- Philobota dedecorata Meyrick, 1915
- Philobota delochorda (Turner, 1917)
- Philobota delosema Turner, 1917
- Philobota delosticha (Lower, 1915)
- Philobota deltoloma (Lower, 1923)
- Philobota diaereta Turner, 1917
- Philobota dichotoma (Turner, 1941)
- Philobota dictyodes (Meyrick, 1889)
- Philobota dysphorata (Turner, 1938)
- Philobota egena (Turner, 1940)
- Philobota ellenella (Newman, 1856)
- Philobota embologramma (Turner, 1916)
- Philobota enchalca Turner, 1917
- Philobota ennephela (Meyrick, 1883)
- Philobota epibosca (Turner, 1937)
- Philobota epipercna (Turner, 1917)
- Philobota erebodes Meyrick, 1884
- Philobota eremosema Lower, 1915
- Philobota eremotropha (Turner, 1938)
- Philobota euageta Turner, 1944
- Philobota euarmosta Turner, 1944
- Philobota euchlora (Turner, 1896)
- Philobota euethira (Turner, 1944)
- Philobota euzancla (Turner, 1938)
- Philobota foedatella (Walker, 1864)
- Philobota fumifera (Turner, 1939)
- Philobota futilis Meyrick, 1920
- Philobota glaucoptera Meyrick, 1884
- Philobota gonostropha Lower, 1896
- Philobota grammatica (Meyrick, 1883)
- Philobota haplogramma (Turner, 1917)
- Philobota haplostola (Turner, 1937)
- Philobota hemera (Meyrick, 1886)
- Philobota hemeris Meyrick, 1915
- Philobota hemichrysa (Lower, 1916)
- Philobota heptasticta (Turner, 1937)
- Philobota heterophaea Turner, 1944
- Philobota hexasticta (Turner, 1937)
- Philobota hiracistis Meyrick, 1889
- Philobota homochroa (Turner, 1916)
- Philobota homophyla (Turner, 1937)
- Philobota humerella (Walker, 1863)
- Philobota hydara Meyrick, 1884
- Philobota hylophila (Turner, 1917)
- Philobota hypocausta Meyrick, 1884
- Philobota hypopolia (Turner, 1917)
- Philobota ignava Meyrick, 1913
- Philobota immemor (Meyrick, 1913)
- Philobota impletella (Walker, 1869)
- Philobota incompta Turner, 1944
- Philobota iphigenes Meyrick, 1889
- Philobota ischnodes (Meyrick, 1902)
- Philobota ischnophanes (Turner, 1937)
- Philobota isomora Turner, 1915
- Philobota isonoma Common, 1996
- Philobota latifissella (Walker, 1864)
- Philobota laxeuta (Meyrick, 1913)
- Philobota leptochorda (Turner, 1916)
- Philobota leucodelta (Turner, 1938)
- Philobota limenarcha Meyrick, 1913
- Philobota lochmaula (Turner, 1917)
- Philobota lonchota Turner, 1896
- Philobota lutulenta (Meyrick, 1913)
- Philobota lysizona Meyrick, 1889
- Philobota macrostola (Turner, 1938)
- Philobota marcens Meyrick, 1914
- Philobota mathematica (Meyrick, 1883)
- Philobota melanoglypta Meyrick, 1889
- Philobota melanogypsa (Turner, 1938)
- Philobota melanoxantha Meyrick, 1889
- Philobota melanthes (Lower, 1899)
- Philobota meraca (Turner, 1937)
- Philobota metaxantha (Turner, 1941)
- Philobota microxantha Meyrick, 1889
- Philobota moestella (Walker, 1864)
- Philobota monogramma Meyrick, 1884
- Philobota monoides (Turner, 1917)
- Philobota monospila (Turner, 1937)
- Philobota mucida (Turner, 1938)
- Philobota myrochrista (Meyrick, 1920)
- Philobota napaea (Turner, 1917)
- Philobota nephelarcha Meyrick, 1884
- Philobota nephelota Turner, 1944
- Philobota obliviosa Meyrick, 1913
- Philobota ochlophila (Turner, 1938)
- Philobota olympias Meyrick, 1889
- Philobota omotypa Turner, 1944
- Philobota orecta (Turner, 1938)
- Philobota orescoa (Meyrick, 1883)
- Philobota orinoma Meyrick, 1884
- Philobota ortholoma (Turner, 1937)
- Philobota orthomita Turner, 1917
- Philobota orthotoma Turner, 1917
- Philobota oxyptila (Turner, 1937)
- Philobota pachychorda (Turner, 1937)
- Philobota pacifera (Meyrick, 1914)
- Philobota paragypsa Lower, 1900
- Philobota partitella (Walker, 1864)
- Philobota pasteoptera (Turner, 1937)
- Philobota pedetis Meyrick, 1884
- Philobota perangusta (Turner, 1936)
- Philobota perioeca (Turner, 1937)
- Philobota perixantha Turner, 1896
- Philobota perpetua (Meyrick, 1913)
- Philobota petrinodes (Lower, 1901)
- Philobota phaeodelta (Turner, 1937)
- Philobota philostaura (Meyrick, 1883)
- Philobota phlaura (Turner, 1938)
- Philobota physaula Meyrick, 1914
- Philobota pilidiota (Turner, 1917)
- Philobota pilipes (Butler, 1882)
- Philobota placophaea (Turner, 1937)
- Philobota plesiosperma (Turner, 1937)
- Philobota pleurosticha (Turner, 1936)
- Philobota plicilinea (Turner, 1938)
- Philobota polypenthes (Turner, 1939)
- Philobota prepodes (Turner, 1937)
- Philobota productella (Walker, 1864)
- Philobota profuga (Meyrick, 1913)
- Philobota proscedes (Turner, 1936)
- Philobota protecta Meyrick, 1920
- Philobota protorthra (Meyrick, 1883)
- Philobota psacasta (Meyrick, 1883)
- Philobota psammochroa (Lower, 1894)
- Philobota publicana (Meyrick, 1914)
- Philobota pulvifera (Turner, 1937)
- Philobota pycnoda (Lower, 1907)
- Philobota pyrota (Meyrick, 1889)
- Philobota rhadinosticha (Turner, 1938)
- Philobota rhipidura (Meyrick, 1913)
- Philobota ruinosa (Meyrick, 1913)
- Philobota scieropa Meyrick, 1889
- Philobota scioessa (Turner, 1938)
- Philobota scitula (Turner, 1917)
- Philobota semantica (Turner, 1916)
- Philobota silignias (Lower, 1899)
- Philobota similis (Turner, 1937)
- Philobota sophia Turner, 1896
- Philobota sordidella (Walker, 1864)
- Philobota sphenoleuca Lower, 1907
- Philobota spodotis Turner, 1944
- Philobota stella (Newman, 1856)
- Philobota stenophylla (Turner, 1939)
- Philobota stenotypa (Turner, 1917)
- Philobota sthenopis Turner, 1927
- Philobota stictoloma (Turner, 1944)
- Philobota stramentaria (Turner, 1916)
- Philobota strigatella (Donovan, 1805)
- Philobota strongyla (Turner, 1936)
- Philobota susanae (Lower, 1900)
- Philobota syncolla (Turner, 1917)
- Philobota syneches (Turner, 1914)
- Philobota synnephes (Turner, 1937)
- Philobota tanyscia (Meyrick, 1883)
- Philobota thiobaphes (Turner, 1937)
- Philobota thiocrossa (Turner, 1917)
- Philobota thiogramma Meyrick, 1889
- Philobota tranquilla (Turner, 1937)
- Philobota transversella (Walker, 1864)
- Philobota trigonosema (Turner, 1937)
- Philobota xanthastis (Meyrick, 1889)
- Philobota xanthodisca Turner, 1944
- Philobota xanthopolia (Turner, 1941)
- Philobota xanthoprepes Turner, 1917
- Philobota xerodes (Lower, 1900)
- Philobota xipheres Turner, 1896
- Philobota xiphopepla (Lower, 1920)
- Philobota xiphostola Meyrick, 1884
- Philobota xuthocrana (Turner, 1937)
- Philobota xylochroa (Lower, 1893)
- Philobota zalias (Lower, 1899)
