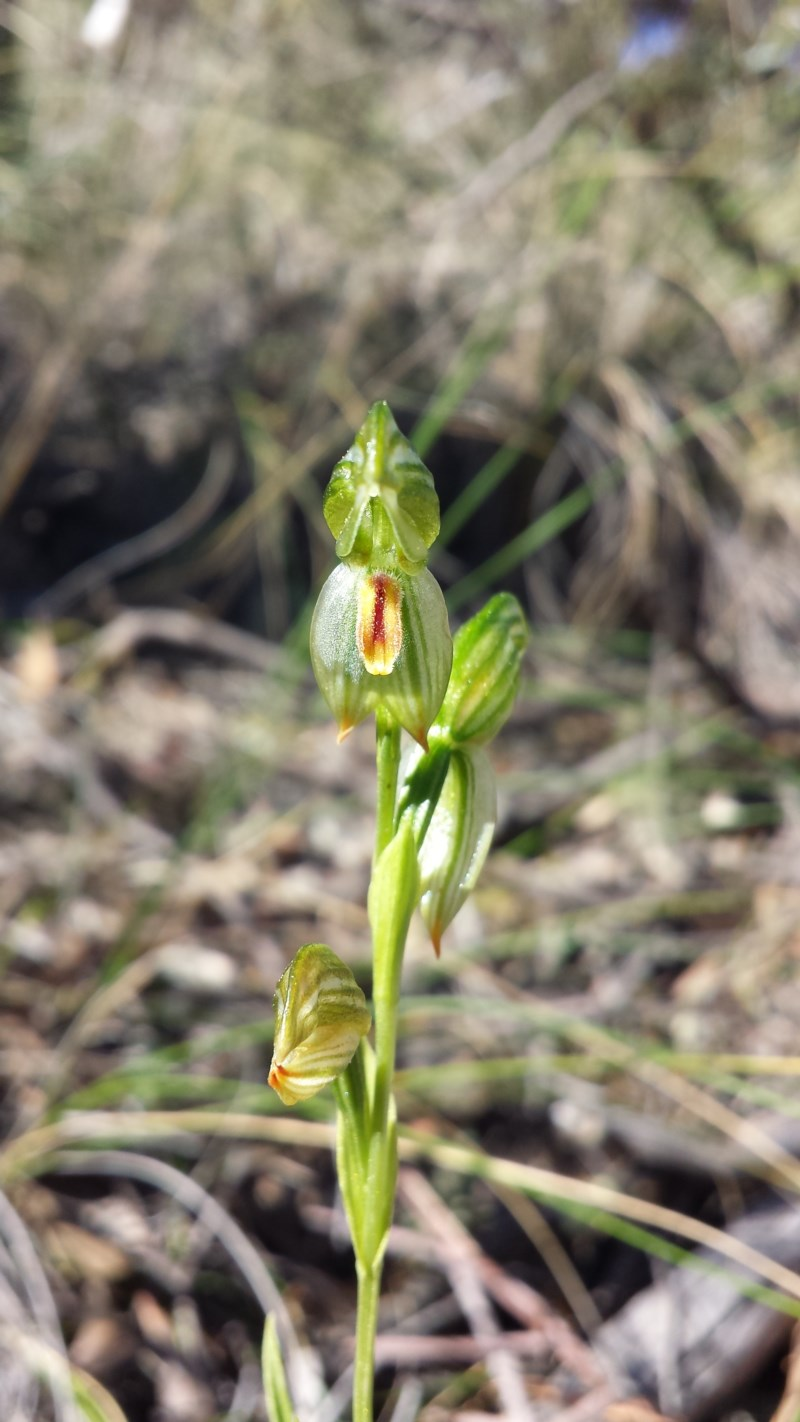
- Pterostylis umbrina growing in the Aranda Bushland

Scientific classification
- Kingdom: Plantae
- Clade: Tracheophytes
- Clade: Angiosperms
- Clade: Monocots
- Order: Asparagales
- Family: Orchidaceae
- Subfamily: Orchidoideae
- Tribe: Cranichideae
- Genus: Pterostylis
- Species: P. umbrina

Binomial name
- Pterostylis umbrina (D.L.Jones) G.N.Backh.

Synonyms
- Bunochilus umbrinus D.L.Jones

= Pterostylis umbrina =

Broad-sepaled leafy greenhood

Species of orchid

Pterostylis umbrina, commonly known as the broad-sepaled leafy greenhood, is a plant in the orchid family Orchidaceae and is endemic to the Australian Capital Territory and New South Wales on the Southern Tablelands. As with similar greenhoods, plants in flower differ from those that are not. Those not in flower have a rosette of leaves flat on a short stalk. Plants in flower have up to six green flowers with darker green stripes with stem leaves but lack a rosette.

== Description ==
Pterostylis diminuta, is a terrestrial, perennial, deciduous, herb with an underground tuber. Plants not in flower have a rosette of between three and five, lance-shaped or elliptic leaves on a stalk 20–65 mm (0.8–3 in) tall, each leaf 7–35 mm (0.3–1 in) long and 4–10 mm (0.2–0.4 in) wide. When flowering, plants lack a rosette but have up to six flowers on a flowering spike 150–600 mm (6–20 in) high with four to seven linear to lance-shaped stem leaves that are 20–80 mm (0.8–3 in) long and 4–9 mm (0.2–0.4 in) wide. The flowers are 14–17 mm (0.6–0.7 in) long, 7–9 mm (0.28–0.35 in) wide. The dorsal sepal and petals are joined to form a hood called the "galea" over the column. The galea is green with darker green stripes and a curved, orange-brown tip. The petals are 13–15 mm (0.5–0.6 in) long, 3–4 mm (0.12–0.16 in) wide and expanded near the middle. The lateral sepals turn downwards and are 13–15 mm (0.5–0.6 in) long, 4–6 mm (0.16–0.24 in) wide and joined for more than half their length. The labellum is 4–5 mm (0.16–0.20 in) long, about 2 mm (0.08 in) wide and brownish with a dark stripe along its mid-line. Flowering occurs from August to October.

== Taxonomy and naming ==
The broad-sepaled leafy greenhood was first formally described in 2006 by David Jones and Mark Clements and given the name Bunochilus umbrinus. The description was published in Australian Orchid Research from a specimen collected in the Australian Capital Territory. In 2007, Gary Backhouse changed the name to Pterostylis umbrina. The specific epithet (umbrina) is a Latin word meaning "dull brown", referring to the colour of the labellum compared to P. macrosepala.

== Distribution and habitat ==
Pterostylis umbrina occurs on Black Mountain in the Australian Capital Territory and in disjunct populations in New South Wales between Burrinjuck and Tumut. It grows in forest with grasses and shrubs.
