= Frederic Slater =

Australian archaeologist

Frederic Slater (c. 1880–10 March 1947) was an Australian journalist, poet, researcher and "authority on aboriginal folk lore".

In the 1930s, Slater was founder and president of the short-lived Australian Archaeological and Education Research Society, also known as the Australian Archaeological Society. He married Katherine Elizabeth Plowman, who survived him and was executor of his will. They had one son, Ederic Charles James Sutherland Slater, born in January 1923.

== Aboriginal studies ==
Slater studied Aboriginal place names and archaeological sites and provided information on Aboriginal languages including, for example, the meaning of Canberra and Queanbeyan.

=== Egypt theory ===
His best known contribution, which has been described as pseudoarchaeology, is the claim that Aboriginal Australians came from Egypt, based on carvings at Devil's Rock, Wollombi, in the Royal National Park, Brunswick Heads, and other locations. In 1939, he called the mound south of Brunswick Heads an ancient Aboriginal place of worship before European colonisation.

In an address at Sydney, to the Anthropological Society of New South Wales, he claimed the carvings were especially significant ...totems, symbols and ideographs, which show that the ancestors of original Australians migrated from Egypt in the late paleolithic and the neolithic ages.

Slater's observations and theories have been supported in recent years by other pseudoarchaeologists such as Steven Strong.

Slater also published in Mankind, the journal of the Australian Anthropological Society.

== Published works ==
- Slater, F. 1937, Interpretation of the Drawings of Barragurra and Yango, ANZUS, Auckland 1937.
- Slater, F., 'Geographical nomenclature: Larmer's native names of points at Port Jackson', Mankind, Volume 1, Issue 9, pages 213–218, May 1934, (or June 1934) Australian Anthropological Society.
