= Clifton Cappie Towle =

Australian anthropologist

- Born: 1888; Penrith, New South Wales, Australia
- Died: 22 March 1946 (aged 57–58); Eastwood, New South Wales, Australia
- Education: University of Sydney
- Occupation: Anthropologist
- Known for: Founding member of The Anthropological Society of New South Wales

Clifton Cappie Towle (1888–1946), founding member of The Anthropological Society of New South Wales in 1928 with William Walford Thorpe. Clifton Towle was born in Penrith, New South Wales, Australia on 15 Mar 1891 to Charles Towle and Laura A Gow. He obtained a Bachelor of Arts degree at University of Sydney in 1919 but spent much of his working life with the New South Wales Government Railways and followed his interest in anthropology as a very active amateur, gaining knowledge from his own private reading and field observations, and donated many wood and stone Aboriginal artefacts and photographs to Hornshaw’s collection. He travelled to south western Queensland and western New South Wales on these field trips. His personal collection of Aboriginal artefacts was donated to the Australian Museum on his death in 1946.

Towle published widely, in Oceania, The Victorian Naturalist, the Australian Anthropological Society Journal, Mankind and the Proceedings of the Royal Society of New South Wales. Perhaps his greatest body of work involved hundreds of photographs of carved trees or "dendroglyphs", which he collected around New South Wales and Queensland. These were subsequently donated to the Australian Museum.

Towle died on 22 March 1946 at Eastwood, New South Wales, Australia.
