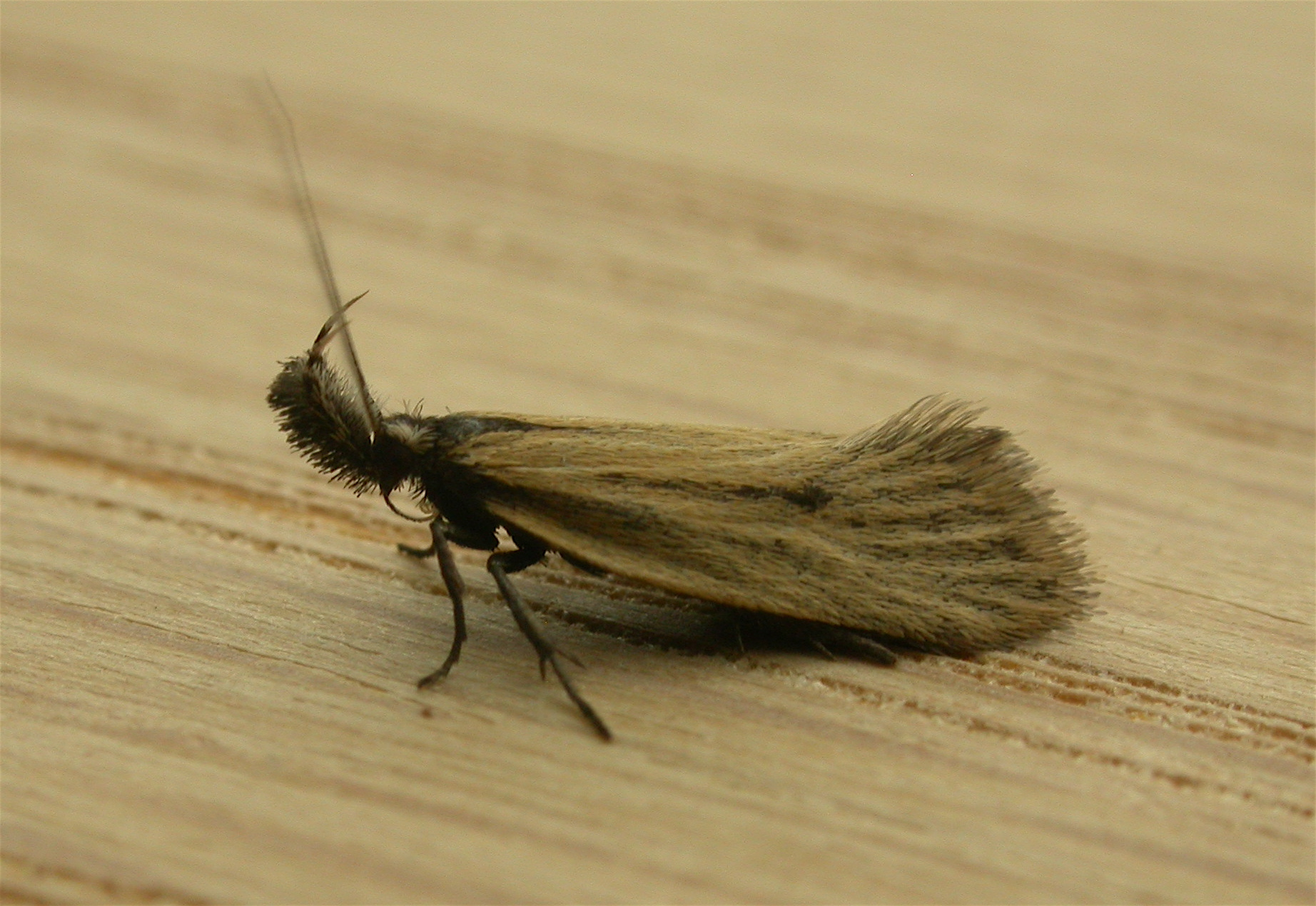
- Adult T. protogramma photographed in Aranda, Australian Capital Territory

Scientific classification
- Domain: Eukaryota
- Kingdom: Animalia
- Phylum: Arthropoda
- Class: Insecta
- Order: Lepidoptera
- Family: Oecophoridae
- Genus: Thema
- Species: T. protogramma

Binomial name
- Thema protogramma (Meyrick, 1884)

Synonyms
- Pleurota protogramma Meyrick, 1884; Pleurota crassinervis Meyrick, 1884

= Thema protogramma =

Species of moth

Thema protogramma is a species of moth in the family Oecophoridae. It was first described by Edward Meyrick in 1884 and is endemic to Australia. Adults are variable in appearance, but the palpi are distinctive, having a fringe of long hairs underneath that is even in length throughout.
