= Weetangera =

- Suburb
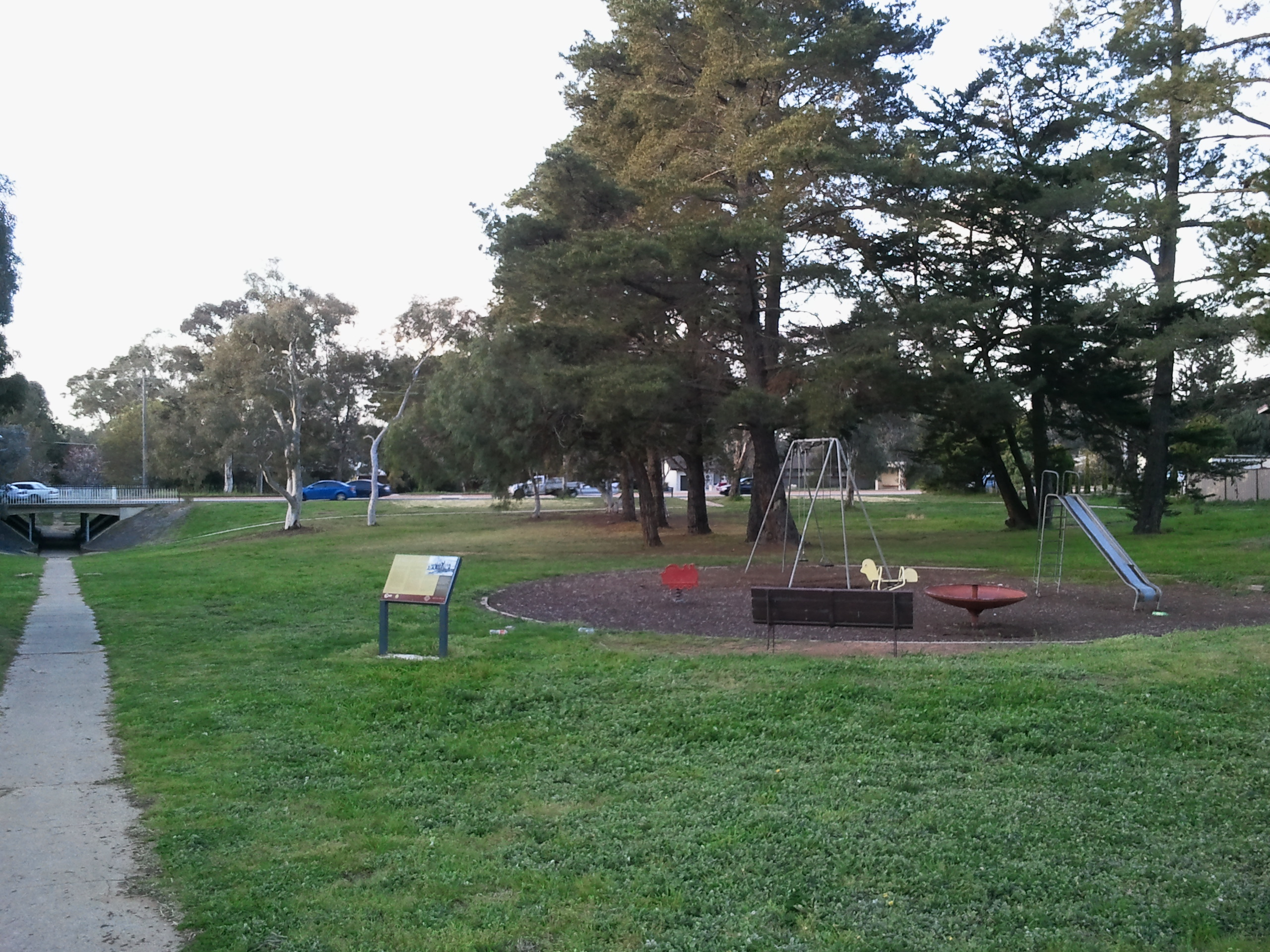
- Site of original Weetangera school, looking north to Belconnen Way.

- Coordinates: 35°15′00″S 149°02′56″E
- Country: Australia
- State: Australian Capital Territory
- City: Canberra
- District: Belconnen

Government
  - Territory electorate: Ginninderra
  - Federal division: Canberra

Area
  - Total: 1.6 km^{2} (0.62 sq mi)

Population
  - Total: 2,795 (SAL 2021)
- Postcode: 2614
- Gazetted: 22 August 1968
Suburbs around Weetangera
Scullin	Page	Belconnen
Hawker	Weetangera	Macquarie
		Cook

Weetangera (/ˈwiːtæŋɡərə/) is a suburb in the Belconnen district of Canberra, located within the Australian Capital Territory, Australia. The suburb covers an area of approximately 158 hectares (390 acres). Located approximately 10 kilometres (6.2 mi) north-west of the city, Weetangera is bounded by Springvale Drive to the south and west, Coulter Drive to the east and Belconnen Way to the north. The Pinnacle Nature Reserve, a Canberra Nature Park is adjacent to the south of the suburb, across Springvale Drive.

== Etymology ==
Weetangera is named after the original name of the property "Spring Vale", which in turn had been given a name of Aboriginal origin. In 1934, Australian journalist Frederic Slater claimed that the name "Wittanjirra" was an Aboriginal word meaning "to suck, to drink greedily", referring to a spring near the Weetangera Public School. However, Slater does not provide evidence to support this claim.

== History ==
Aboriginal settlement of the Australian Capital Territory dates back over 20,000 years. Grinding grooves located on the Molonglo River to the south of Weetangera provide evidence of Aboriginal use of the region pre-colonisation. Members of the 'Canberra Tribe' continued to camp near Weetangera until the 1860s.

Europeans first settled in the area in the 1820s, with the name Weetangera (also Weetangerra and Weetangara in early documents) applied to the local vicinity from this time. Weetangera was also the name for the historic Weetangera parish, which included the land from Ginninderra Creek to the Molonglo River.

The Weetangera Public School was first built to service the area in 1875, facing onto the Weetangera Road (now Belconnen Way).

Samuel Shumack lived at "Spring Vale" in Weetangera between 1866 and 1915. Shumack and his father had taken up the land for farming when Samuel was eight years old. Samuel Shumack lived on the property with his family until it was claimed as land for the nation's capital in 1915.

The Southwell family were significant to Weetangera, and various members of the family are buried in the Weetangera Cemetery and former Methodist Church now sited to the west of the adjoining suburb, Hawker.

The modern suburb of Weetangera was officially gazetted by the ACT Government in 1968, with a street theme: 'Pioneers of the Australian Capital Territory'. After the gazetting, the first modern settlers moved into the suburb in 1970 and the first students moved into the Weetangera Primary School, located about a kilometre from the old Weetangera Primary School, in 1973. Today, the suburb is home to over 2500 people.

== Governance ==
For the purposes of Australian federal elections for the House of Representatives, Weetangera is in the Division of Canberra.

For the purposes of Australian Capital Territory elections for the ACT Legislative Assembly, Weetangera is in the Ginninderra electorate.

== Demographics ==
People who live in Weetangera are called Weetangerans. At the 2016 census, Weetangera had a population of 2,576 people. The census shows that Weetangera residents have a median age of 43 which is older than the ACT median of 35 and the Australian median of 38.

Weetangera's population is predominantly Australian-born; 75.0 per cent on census night 2016. The second most common birthplace was England at 4.3 per cent. The most common religion is 'no religion', with 41.0% of the population reporting they were not religious.

== Suburb amenities ==
Weetangera has a small shopping centre containing a bakery, beauty salon, dentist, coffee shop, gym, Pakistani restaurant and cleaner.

The suburb is also home to the Weetangera Neighbourhood Oval. The ACT Government announced restoration plans for the oval in June 2012, committing $4 million to three ovals, including the Weetangera oval, over a three-year period. The money is for the installation of irrigation systems, synthetic cricket wickets and practice nets, floodlights and a small pavilion and toilet block.

== Educational institutions ==
Both Weetangera Primary School (1973–present) and Weetangera Preschool.

=== Historic Public School ===
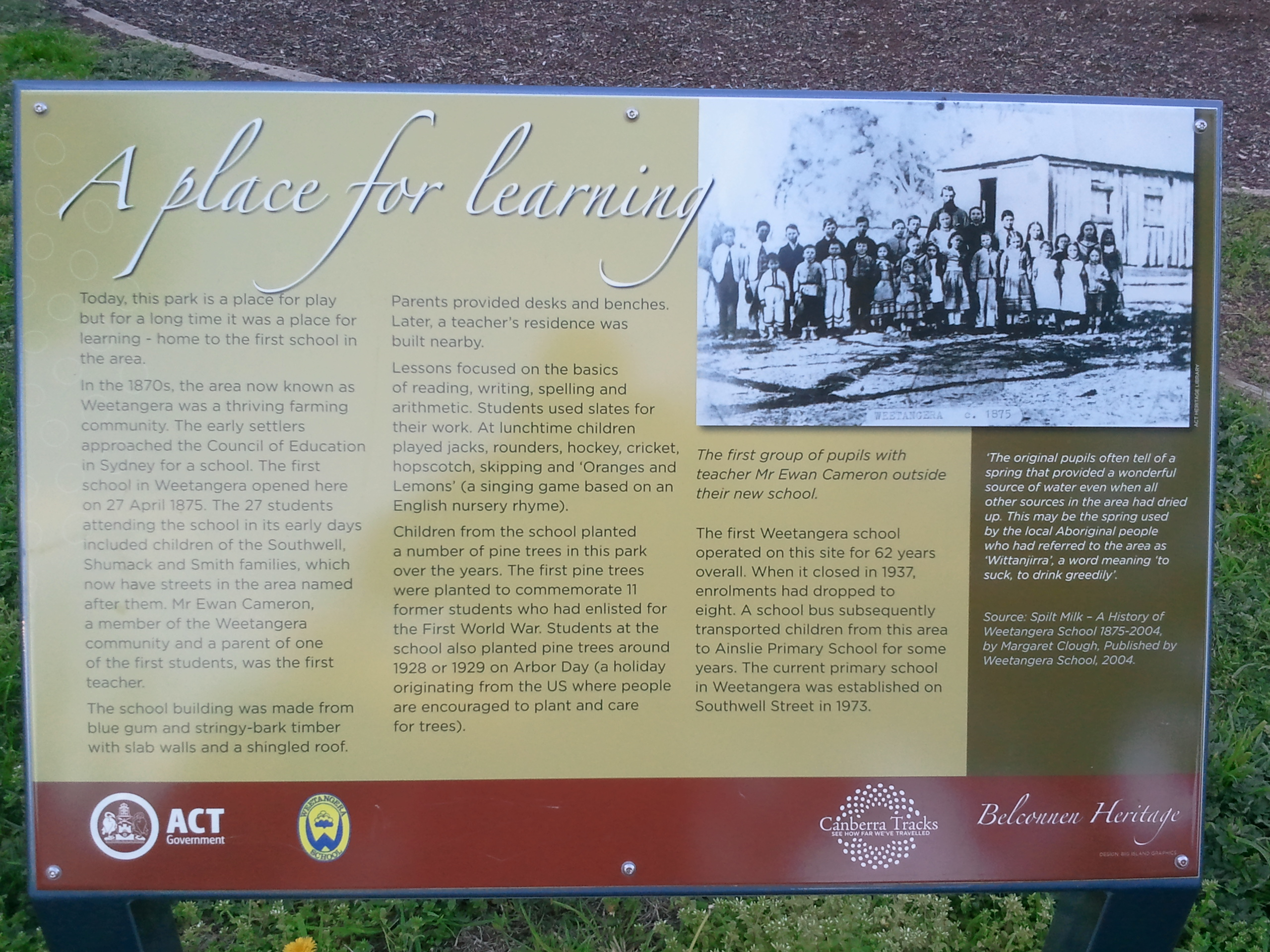
Sign giving history of the original Public School, Weetangera.

The first Public School (pre-High School) was sited on land of the original farming property, and opened on 27 April 1875, with 27 students. The first teacher was Mr Ewan Cameron, a member of the Weetangera community and a parent of a student.

The site is between (beside) the present Belconnen Way (north) and Smith and Kinleyside Streets (south). It now a park, with children's play area, with several lines of pine trees that were planted by students of the original school in about 1919 and 1928/9 (Arbor Day).

== People honoured in the streets of Weetangera ==
The street names in Weetangera are predominantly named for ACT pioneers:

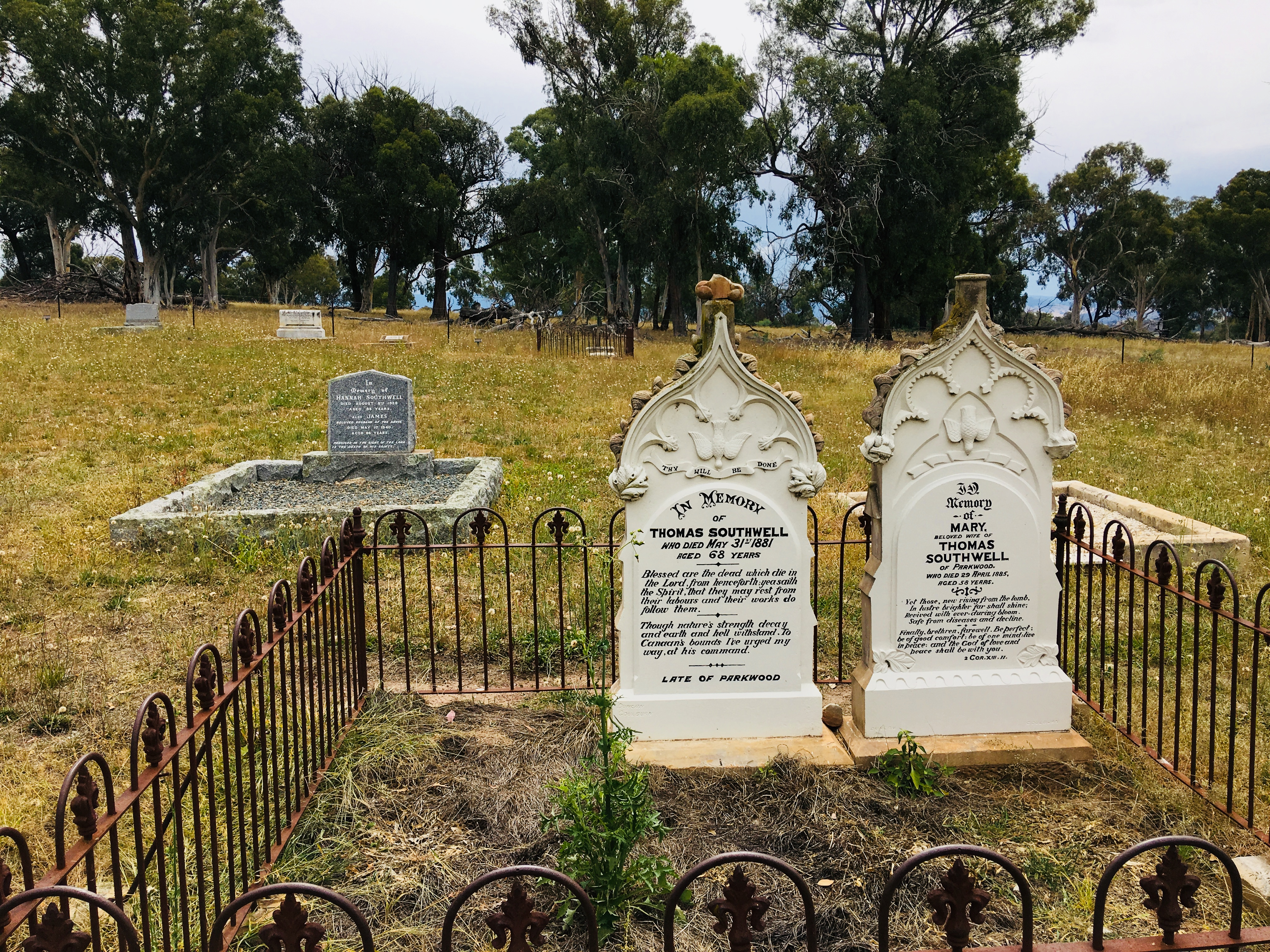
Southwell family graves, late 1800s, Weetangera Cemetery

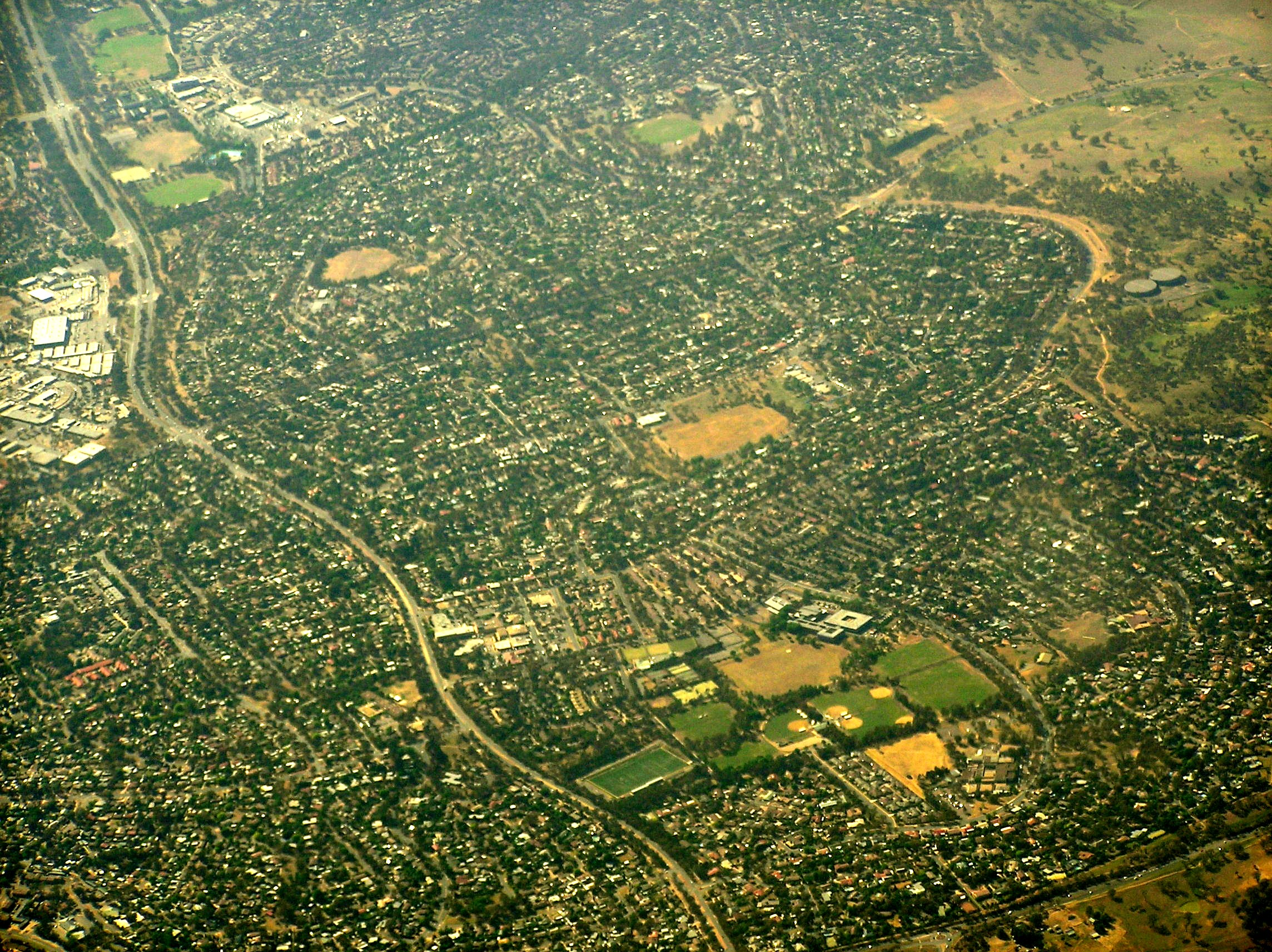
Weetangera is in the centre of this aerial photo.

- Abernethy Street – James Abernethy (1830–1920), an overseer and later superintendent of `Yarralumla Station', 1857–63; schoolmaster and clerk at St John the Baptist Church, 1863–80.
- Bambridge Street – Edwin Elijah Bambridge (1815–1879), who planted some of the first willow trees along the Molonglo River.
- Belconnen Way – "Belconnen" was originally the name of a pioneer's homestead and later of a rural district of the ACT.
- Coppin Place – John Coppin (born circa 1840). Coppins Crossing, across the lower Molonglo River, is also named for John Coppin.
- Coulter Drive – Robert Charles Coulter (1864–1956); an architect and landscape painter and the co-designer of an award-winning plan in the competition for a Design for the National Capital held in 1911.
- Crace Street – Edward Kendall Crace (1844–1892); one of the original settlers in the Gungahlin area becoming one of the largest landholders in the district; purchased the 'Gungahlin' and 'Ginninderra' properties from William Davis in 1877 and also acquired 'Charnwood'.
- Darmody Street – John Darmody (1817–1877); employed at 'Duntroon Station' in 1858.
- Davis Street – William Davis, senior (1821–1876); arrived in the colony from England on 6 March 1842 on the Palestine with his wife, Jane Elizabeth (née Weston) and several of their children; went to 'Lanyon', home of his daughter and son-in-law; the family moved to Booroomba, where they remained until the early 1860s; sold the property to Charles McKeahnie; Davis then moved to Ginninderra Cottage where he remained until the early 1870s after which he moved to Goulburn; he died in 1876 and his wife died in 1888.
- De Salis Street – Leopold Fabius Dietegen Fane de Salis (1816–1898); a pioneer pastoralist and politician. He purchased Cuppacumbalong Station in 1856; De Salis was the Member for Queanbeyan, 1864–69 and a Member of the Legislative Council of New South Wales, 1874–98.
- Gibbes Place – Augustus Onslow Manby Gibbes (1828–1897); owned Yarralumla sheep station between 1858 and 1881, purchased from Sir Terence Aubrey Murray and sold to Frederick Campbell.
- Gillespie Street – John Gillespie (1809–1889); owned 'Horse Park Station', Ginninderra, 1856–89.
- Harcourt Street – George Harcourt (died 1893), a storekeeper in Ginninderra.
- Jones Place – Thomas Jones (1812–1887); arrived in the district in 1825; carpenter and farmer; held land at Rocky Gully near Mulligan's Flat, Gungahlin District.
- Kilby Crescent – William Kilby (1811–1902); settled at 'Lands End' in Weetangera.
- Kinleyside Crescent – George Kinleyside (1820–1886); was a blacksmith and the Postmaster at Ainslie between 1884 and 1886.
- Line Place – Thomas Harrington Line (1828–1878); a schoolteacher at Canberra, 1858–60; Superintendent of 'Duntroon Station', 1860; also worked the 'Glebe Farm', 1859.
- Mathieson Crescent – William Mathieson (1837–1882); a shepherd on 'Ginninderra Station' from 1860 to 1882.
- Mayo Street – Alfred William Mayo (1856–1936); a pioneering farmer of the Majura area.
- McKeahnie Street – Charles McKeahnie (1809–1903); owner, at various times, of properties in Boboyan, Gudgenby, Orroral and Booroomba areas. He and his wife Elizabeth came to Australia from Scotland in 1838. They were the grandparents of Charlie McKeahnie, who some historians believe to be the inspiration for the poem 'The Man from Snowy River' by Banjo Paterson.
- McLachlan Crescent – Allan McLachlan (1835–1878); the manager of "Duntroon Station" in 1876.
- Morton Street – Andrew Morton (1812–1881); a pioneer medical practitioner and coroner in the Queanbeyan district.
- Mowle Place – Stewart Majoribanks Mowle (1822–1908); employed at 'Yarralumla Station' between 1838 and 1845.
- O'Rourke Street – Terence O'Rourke (1831–1896); employed on 'Duntroon Station' during the 1850s.
- Packer Street – William James Packer (1793–1881); the first settler at Gundaroo in 1824, who owned 'Esthermead Estate'.
- Plummer Street – Levi Plummer (1822–1876); settled at Weetangera in the early 1870s; died after falling from a horse in 1876; his wife, Frances (née Guthridge), died in 1891.
- Shumack Street – Richard Shumack (1817–1887); father of Samuel Shumack and employed at 'Duntroon Station' between 1856 and 1858 and later with his son, Samuel, established 'Springvale Station' at Weetangera.
- Smith Street – named for ACT pioneer clergymen.
- Southwell Street – Thomas Southwell (1813–1881); the owner of "Parkwood" station from 1854. Southwell was responsible for the introduction of Methodism into the Weetangera area.
- Springvale Drive – named for a homestead in the Weetangera area established by Samuel Shumack and his father Richard Shumack in 1866.
- Vest Place – Richard Vest (1855–1922); an overseer at 'Yarralumla Station', 1897–1911.
- Webb Place – George Solomon Webb (1783–1868); a pioneer settler in the Tidbinbilla area, 1833; married to Sarah Rolfe, the step-daughter of Timothy Beard. Their eldest daughter Eliza Webb married John McDonald, the son of the original settlers at Uriarra. Mount Eliza in Tidbinbilla is believed to be named in her honour.
- Weetangera Place – the name has been associated with the area since the days of the early settlers.

== Geology ==
Silurian age green grey rhyodacite of the Walker Volcanics underlie the whole suburb.
