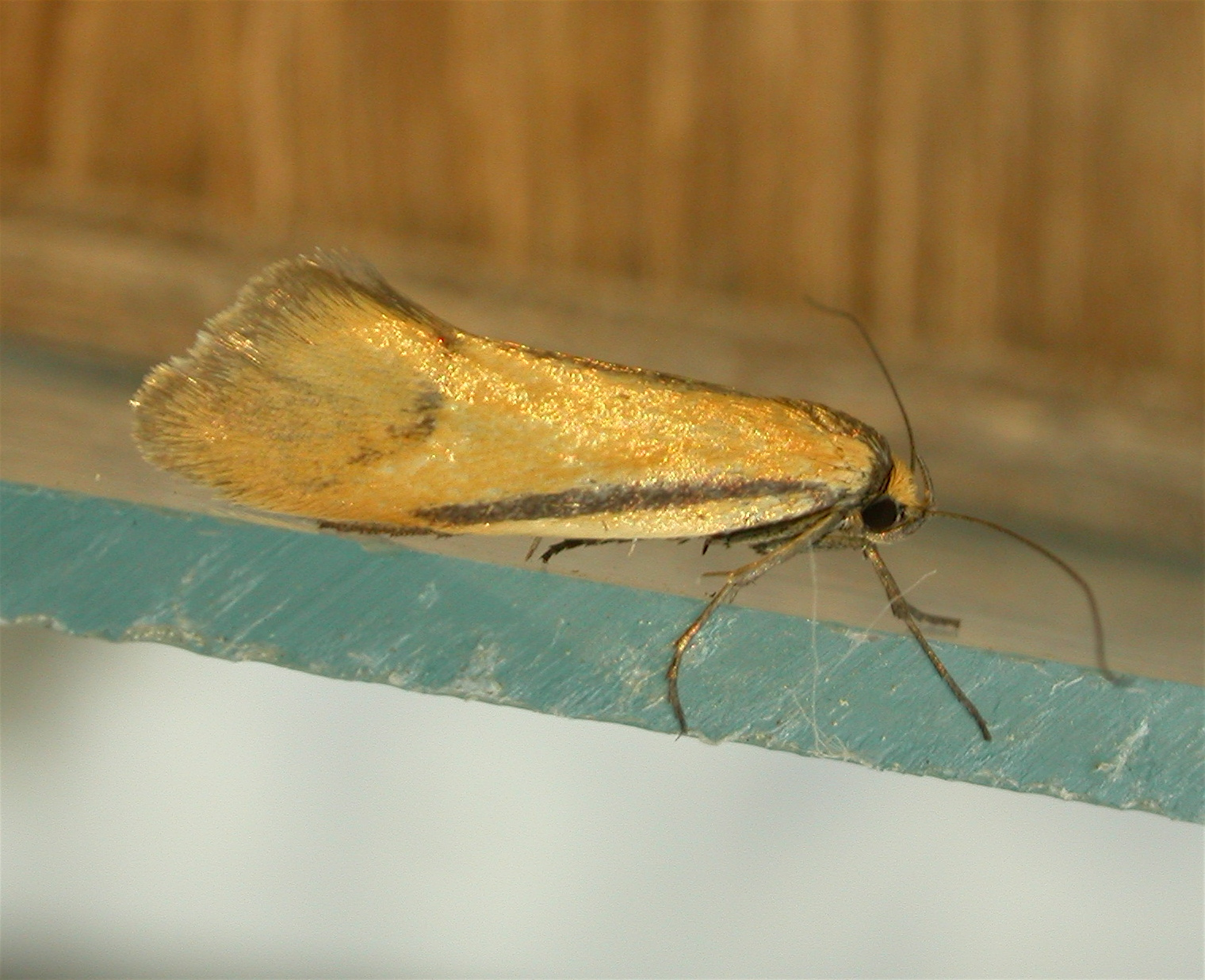
- Adult of Philobota arabella or a related species, Aranda (Australia)

Scientific classification
- Kingdom: Animalia
- Phylum: Arthropoda
- Clade: Pancrustacea
- Class: Insecta
- Order: Lepidoptera
- Family: Oecophoridae
- Genus: Philobota
- Species: P. arabella

Binomial name
- Philobota arabella (Newman, 1856)

Synonyms
- Oecophora arabella Newman, 1856

= Philobota arabella =

Species of moth

Philobota arabella is a moth of the family Oecophoridae. It is found in the dry grassy native woodlands of Victoria.

The wingspan is about 25 mm. Adults are on wing in September and October. The larvae are thought to feed in leaf litter.
