= William Thorpe =

William Thorpe may refer to:

- William de Thorpe (died 1361), English Chief Justice
- William Thorpe, putative author of the 1407 Lollard text The Testimony of William Thorpe
- William Homan Thorpe (1902–1986), British ethologist
- William Walford Thorpe (1869–1932), ethnologist of the Australian Museum
- Billy Thorpe (1946–2007), English-born Australian singer-songwriter, producer, and musician

== See also ==
- Will Thorp (born 1977), actor
