= A Time for Tea =

2011 book by Piya Chatterjee

A Time for Tea: Women, Labor and Post-colonial Politics on an Indian Plantation (2011) is a post-colonial feminist ethnographic critique of labour practices in Indian tea plantations. Through personal interviews, anecdotes and a play, Piya Chatterjee examines the role gender, class, and race play in the production, consumption and circulation of tea. Transcending the realm of local politics and culture, the ethnography reveals the multilayered, multispatial, colonial dimension of gendered labour. She begins by deconstructing the image of the tea box itself to showcase how the image of the exotic tea-plucking women distracts the consumer from the harsh working conditions of plantations. By providing a historical account of the tea industry in India, Chatterjee reveals the intricate link between colonialism and the gendered division of labour in North Bengalese plantations. While gender is her main unit of analysis, Chatterjee explores the way in which colonialism has shaped and continues to shape, the patriarchal and class-based nature of plantations. Coming from a Global South perspective, she demonstrates the intersectionality of gender, class and race, as mutually constitutive mechanisms of oppression. Throughout the novel, she acknowledges her own privilege as a Global South academic and highlights the difficulties of speaking for the subaltern.

== Awards ==
- Recipient of the John Franklin Hope Book Award from Duke University press.

== Review ==
- "A kaleidoscopic account of the phenomenon of tea, incorporating dramatic interludes via Antonin Artaud’s theatre of the absurd, the poetics of Edward Said and the opiatic imagination of Lewis Carroll, depicting the role tea plays in the high and low drama of empire building as it was and remain in transformation."–The Australian Journal of Anthropology
- "Those searching for an argument about the postcolonial tea economy, or to learn the history of trade unionism on the North Bengal Tea plantation, or even to gain a better understanding of the complexity of gender, caste, and ethnic relations in the region will be disappointed. [...] Her book is more properly read as a meditative and reflective work and deserves to be judged on these terms."-The American Historical Review

== About the author ==
Piya Chatterjee is a historical anthropologist with a current position at the University of California as a women's studies assistant professor. She self identifies as a post/colonial immigrant women. Born from Indian parents in Nigeria, her family moved to Northern India before immigrating to the United States. She received her PhD in anthropology, with a focus on Western Asia, from the University of Chicago in 1994. Academically she describes herself as a "a disciple of Paulo Freire, with a strong postcolonial and antiracist feminist twist." She is currently working on a book titled Decolonizing Pedagogies. Her research is focused on the theories of pedagogy and what education means across borders, from her University classroom to villages in post-colonial India. Her future projects include a decolonizing memoir, which she plans to title “Going Ape": Racisms, Violence and Resistance in the US Academy. Her objective is to develop an ethnographic critique about the cultural and political practices of academia from a postcolonial perspective.

== Other publications ==
- Chatterjee, Piya, and Manalia Desai. 2009. States of Trauma: Gender and Violence in South Asia. Zubaan Press.
- Chatterjee, Piya, and Sunaina Maira. 2014. The Imperial University: Academic Repression and Scholarly Dissent. University of Minnesota Press.
- Chatterjee, Piya. 2008. Comparative Perspectives Symposium: Women’s Labour Activism. University of Chicago Press.
