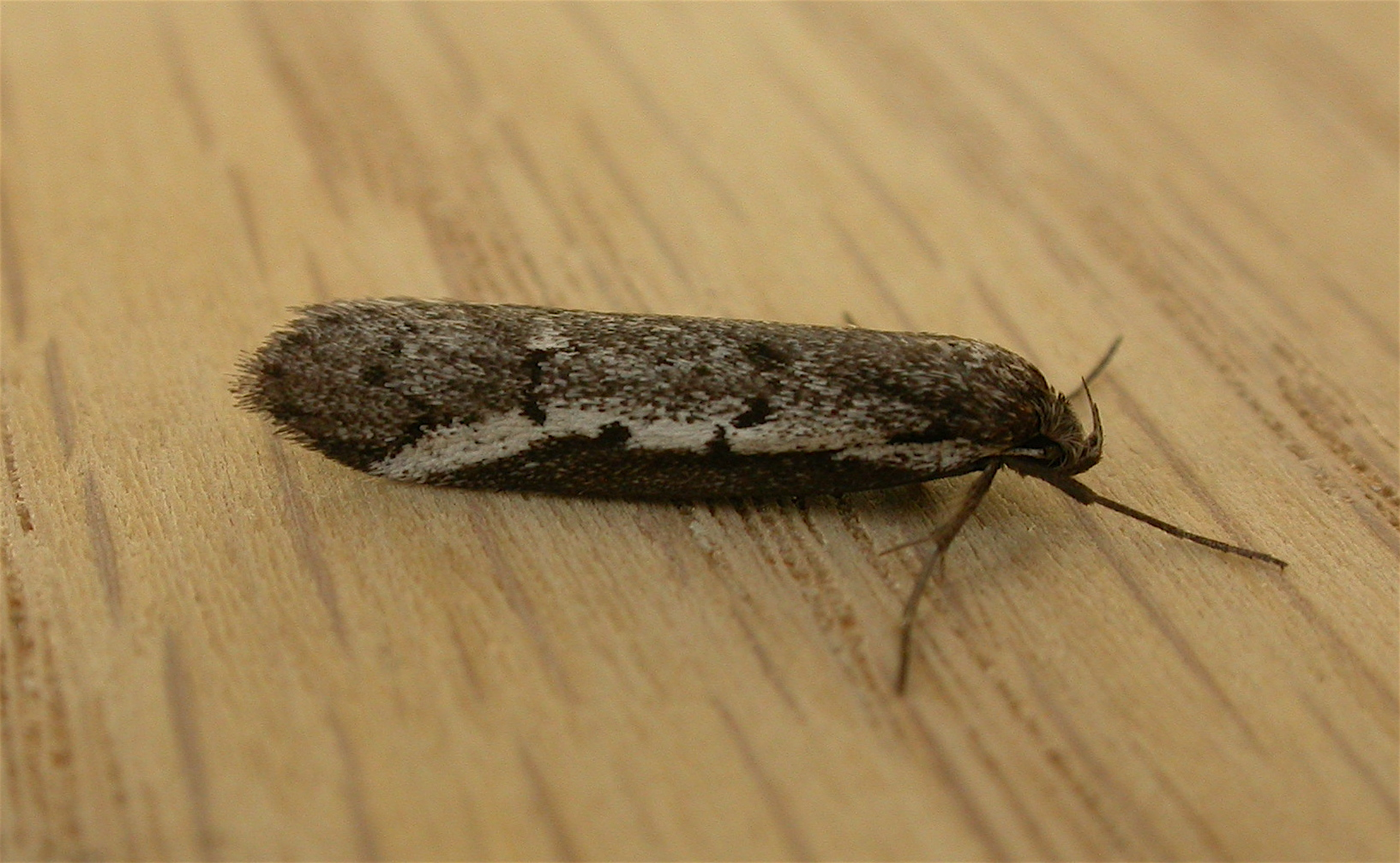

Scientific classification
- Kingdom: Animalia
- Phylum: Arthropoda
- Clade: Pancrustacea
- Class: Insecta
- Order: Lepidoptera
- Family: Oecophoridae
- Genus: Philobota
- Species: P. stella

Binomial name
- Philobota stella Newman, 1856

= Philobota stella =

Species of moth

Philobota stella is a moth of the family Oecophoridae. It is found in Australia, including Tasmania.
