= Cook, Australian Capital Territory =

Cook
- Suburb
- Coordinates: 35°15′35″S 149°03′50″E
- Country: Australia
- State: Australian Capital Territory
- City: Canberra
- District: Belconnen
- Established: 1968

Government
  - Territory electorate: Ginninderra
  - Federal division: Canberra

Area
  - Total: 1.7 km^{2} (0.66 sq mi)

Population
  - Total: 2,965 (SAL 2021)
- Postcode: 2614
Suburbs around Cook
Weetangera	Macquarie	Aranda
Canberra Nature Park	Cook	Aranda
Canberra Nature Park	Canberra Nature Park	Canberra Nature Park

Cook (postcode: 2614) is a suburb of the Belconnen district of Canberra, located within the Australian Capital Territory, Australia. At the 2021 census, Cook had a population of 2,965 people.

The suburb of Cook is named after Captain James Cook and the sixth Prime Minister of Australia Sir Joseph Cook. The streets in Cook are named after notable women from Australian history.

Signs at the perimeter of the suburb's boundaries are a common target for graffiti artists, who alter one letter in the word "Cook" so that it reads "cock".

== Suburb amenities ==
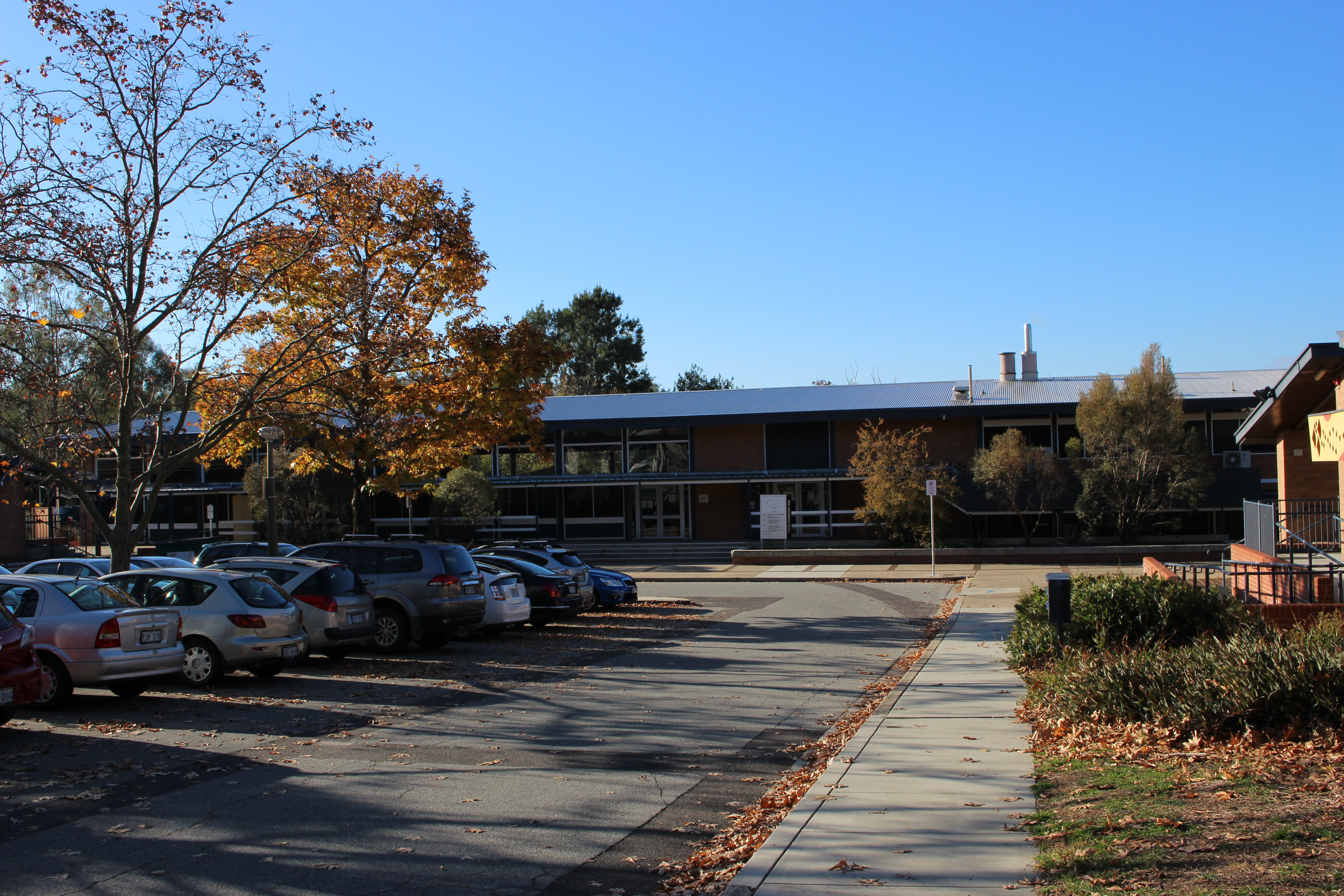
Former Cook Primary

- Cook has a small shopping centre including the Cook Grocer independent supermarket, Little Oink coffee shop, To All My Friends bar, Jina's Hair Salon for men, Prestige Oysters fish monger and a public toilet.
- Cook Community Hub, in place of the Cook Primary School which was a government run school for children in years K-6 until closed at the end of 2007 as part of a rationalisation of primary education across the ACT with most students moving to neighbouring schools in Aranda, Macquarie and Weetangera.
- Cook Preschool
- Cook school park

== Governance ==
For the purposes of Australian federal elections for the House of Representatives, Cook is in the Division of Canberra.

For the purposes of Australian Capital Territory elections for the ACT Legislative Assembly, Cook is in the Ginninderra electorate.

== Geology ==
Greywacke from the Ordovician Pittman Formation forms a band down the east of Cook. This has been uplifted on the east side of the Deakin Fault. The fault heads in the north north west direction in Cook. A porphyry of Green-grey Dacitic intrusive containing large white feldspar crystals is found in the north east corner of Cook. Mount Painter Volcanics dark grey to grey green crystal tuff is found in the centre and south and south west. Green grey rhyodacite of the Walker Volcanics underlie the north west.
