= Philobota chionoptera =

Scientific classification
- Domain: Eukaryota
- Kingdom: Animalia
- Phylum: Arthropoda
- Class: Insecta
- Order: Lepidoptera
- Family: Oecophoridae
- Genus: Philobota
- Species: P. chionoptera

Binomial name
- Philobota chionoptera Meyrick, 1884

Species of moth

Philobota chionoptera is a moth of the family Oecophoridae. It was first described by Edward Meyrick 1884. It is found in Australia and New Zealand.
