= Jamison Centre =

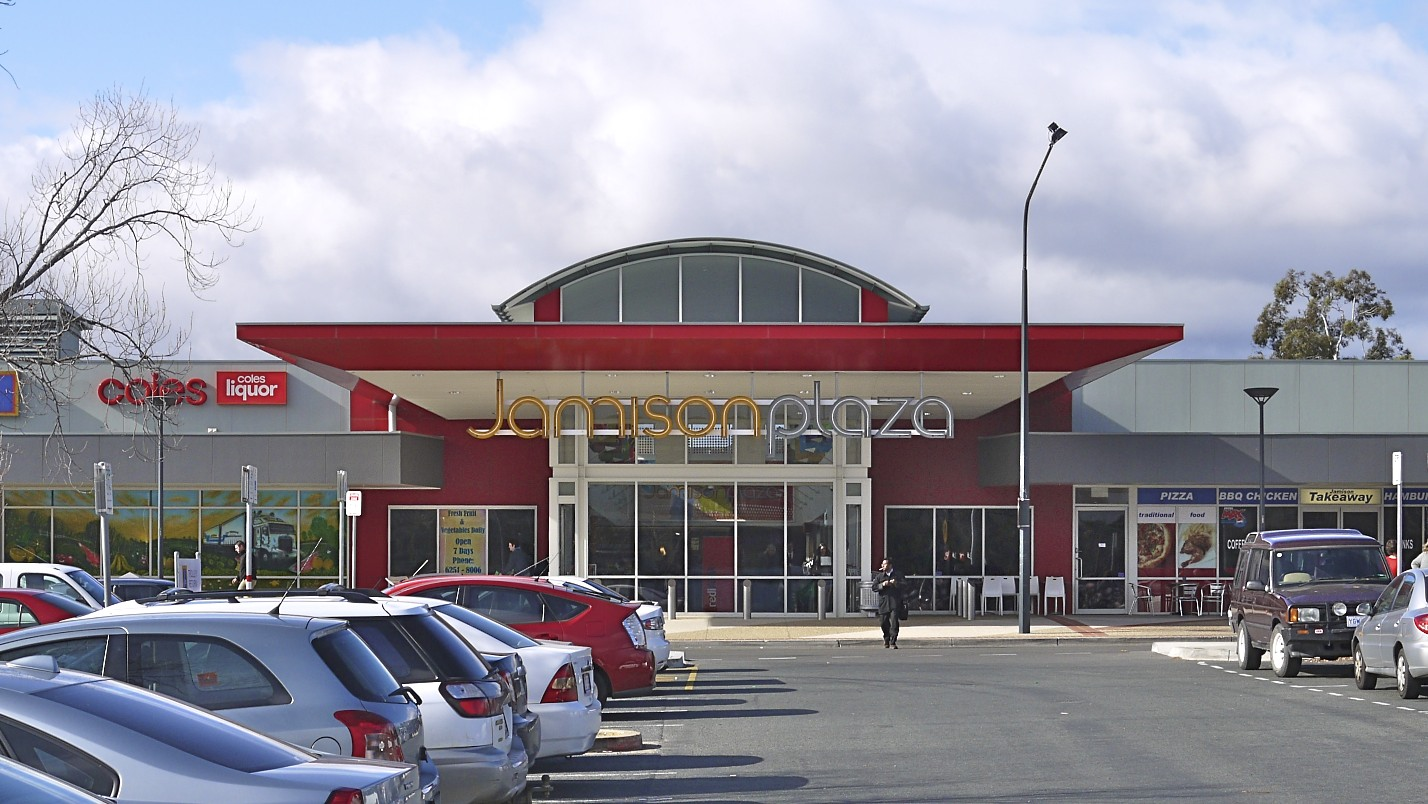
- View from Bowman St
- Location: Bowman St, Macquarie, Australian Capital Territory
- Coordinates: 35°15′10″S 149°04′19″E
- Opened: 1969
- Owner: The Marketplace Group
- Num. of stores: 53
- Num. of anchor tenants: 2
- Floor area: 123,851 m^{2} (1,333,120 sq ft)
- Floors: 1
- Parking: 600 +/-
- Website: www.jamisonplaza.com.au

Jamison Centre (/ˈdʒæmɪsən/) is a large shopping centre located in Belconnen's eastern suburb of Macquarie, Australian Capital Territory. Comprising two indoor/outdoor complexes and a range of standalone stores and facilities, the centre is anchored by Coles and Aldi stores. Other notable facilities are the Jamison branch of the Canberra Southern Cross Club and the Big Splash Water Park.

Jamison Centre is serviced by ACTION bus route 32 which connects Jamison Centre to Belconnen Town Centre and Civic. It is also easily accessible by road from Belconnen Way and Bindubi Street.

The outdoor Belconnen Trash'n'Treasure Market is held every Sunday morning in the Jamison Centre car park. This is one of Canberra's larger outdoor markets, and is operated by the Rotary Club of Belconnen with assistance from the Rotary Clubs of Ginninderra, Hall and Woden.

== History ==
Built in 1969, Jamison Centre was the first shopping development in the Belconnen district, preceding the Belconnen Town Centre by nearly a decade. It was named after Thomas Jamison (1752/53–1811), a First Fleet surgeon and prominent landowner, government official and mercantile trader of the colonial era. Initially, the Jamison Centre was a major commercial area, but it soon began to suffer from the growth of a centrally situated town hub, particularly when the federal government built a major shopping precinct which was later sold to The Westfield Group and is now known as Westfield Belconnen. For many years the Jamison Centre played a significant role in servicing the adjacent area, but decreased in importance and became increasingly neglected.

The decline continued until 2000, when the Humphries government and the private owners of the centre commissioned a master plan to turn the area around. After community consultation, several major issues such as building elevation, access, safety and a lack of meeting places, were noted. The final plan, released in 2002, mapped out a number of methods of achieving this, including improving traffic flow and building new shops and restaurants facing the adjacent streets. With the approval of $8.2m of government funding, a major refurbishment began in January 2006, with most major work completed by early 2008. Though the government provided assurances that the centre would remain open throughout the process, much of the complex was vacant for some time with many long-term retailers moving temporarily to nearby locations.
