= Weetangera Primary School =

Coordinates: 35.250°S 149.049°E

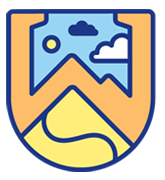

Location
- Southwell Street; Weetangera, Australian Capital Territory, 2614; Australia

Information
- Type: Primary school
- Motto: Successful learning through caring and sharing
- Established: 1973
- Principal: Anna Thorpe
- Grades: Kindergarten-6
- Enrollment: 404 (2025)
- Colour: Navy blue Gold
- Website: http://www.weetangeraps.act.edu.au

Weetangera Primary School is a public coed primary school located in the suburb of Weetangera in Canberra, Australia. It caters for children in kindergarten to grade 6. The school's Principal is currently Anna Thorpe.

== History ==
Weetangera Primary School is named for the suburb it is situated in. The history of the school can be traced back to 1875 when the first school was built in the region about one kilometre from the site of the present school and called Weetangera School. The first school was a stringy-bark hut measuring just three by four metres, with a fireplace but no windows. One of the early school's longest-serving teachers was Ellen Clark, who taught at the school for 26 years. The first Weetangera School closed in 1937, when enrolments dropped to just eight students.

The present-day school opened in February 1973, with an initial enrolment of 384 students.

The enrolment at Weetangera Primary School in 1974, its second year in operation, was 563, despite accommodation providing for only 450 pupils.

Between 1986 and 1988, Weetangera Primary School incorporated a Montessori primary classroom. At the end of 1988, Page Primary School was shut down and pupils moved to Weetangera Primary School.

Until the ACT Schools Authority banned the practice from 1988, corporal punishment was sometimes used at the school.

In July 1990, then ACT Government Minister for Education Gary Humphries announced the Government would close Weetangera Primary School and six other schools. Parents and students protested the decision, and Hugh Hudson was appointed to audit and analyse the savings and impacts of the proposed closures. The Hudson report cast doubt over the closure of Weetangera Primary and two other schools, which were reprieved in the final government decision.

In 1999, the school dedicated its Landcare garden to Barbara Fox, naming it the Barbara Fox Garden. Fox was the school's canteen manager and coordinator of the before and after-school care program. The Landcare garden, featuring more than 300 native plants near the school's entrance, had been developed over several years through a long-term regeneration program.

In 2006, Weetangera Primary School was awarded with a Silver Accreditation Certificate as part of an ACT Government program to encourage schools to reduce less healthy options and increase healthier options. In 2012, SmartStart for Kids named the school its most successful cohort ever, after recording dramatic improvements in strength, flexibility and nutrition training across a group of students in kinder, year 1 and year 2.

== Principals ==
Period	Principal
1973 − 1975	Terry Blythe
1976 − 1985	Don Griffiths
1986 − 1987	Jeannette O'Connell
1988 − 1993	Gwyn Clarke
1994 − 19?	Margaret Clough
19? - 200?	Sue Jose
200? − 2013	Phil Gray
2013 – 2020	James Barnett
2021–2025	Julie Cooper
2026 – present	Anna Thorpe
