= Anthropological Society of New South Wales =

- Formation: 1928
- Dissolved: 1973 – absorbed by Australian Anthropological Society
- Type: NGO
- Headquarters: Sydney, Australia
- Region served: Australia
- Website: aas.asn.au

The Anthropological Society of New South Wales was formed in 1928, by William Walford Thorpe, ethnologist of the Australian Museum, Clifton Cappie Towle and three others.

It published The Australian Journal of Anthropology (originally titled Mankind from 1931), which was later published by the Australian Anthropological Society. Charles Anderson (mineralogist) was president of the society in 1930 and 1931, while Olive Pink was secretary. In 1931, members of the Society excavated an Aboriginal rock shelter at Burrill Lake, New South Wales, which is believed to be in excess of 20,000 years old, the oldest known site on the Australian East Coast.
