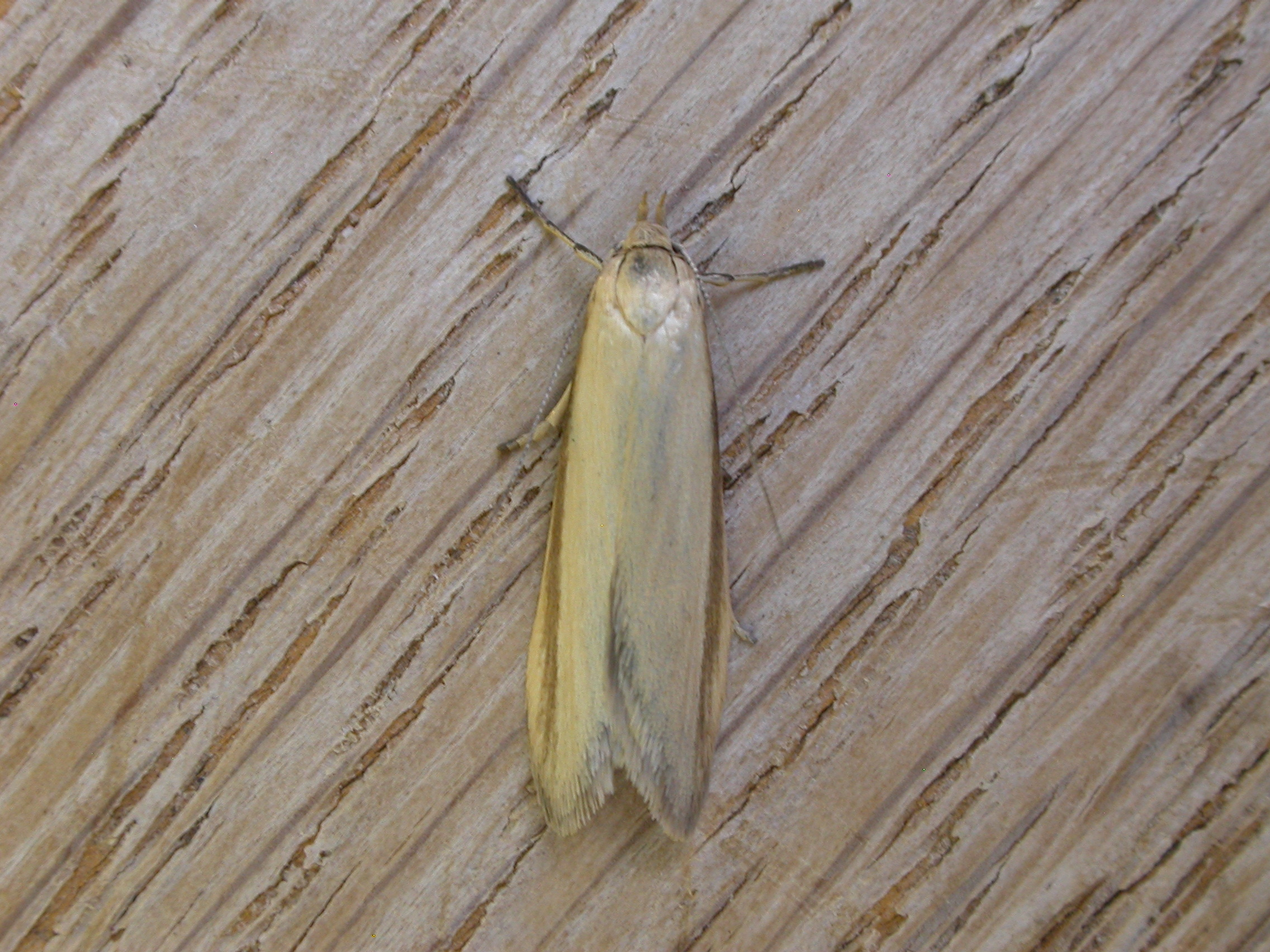

Scientific classification
- Kingdom: Animalia
- Phylum: Arthropoda
- Class: Insecta
- Order: Lepidoptera
- Family: Oecophoridae
- Genus: Philobota
- Species: P. pilipes

Binomial name
- Philobota pilipes (Butler, 1882)

Synonyms
- Latometus pilipes Butler, 1882; Antidica eriomorpha Meyrick, 1883

= Philobota pilipes =

Species of moth

Philobota pilipes is a moth of the family Oecophoridae. It is known from the Australian Capital Territory, New South Wales, Queensland, South Australia and Victoria.

The larvae feed on Poaceae species. They live in a vertical silken tunnel in the soil.
