= Samuel Shumack =

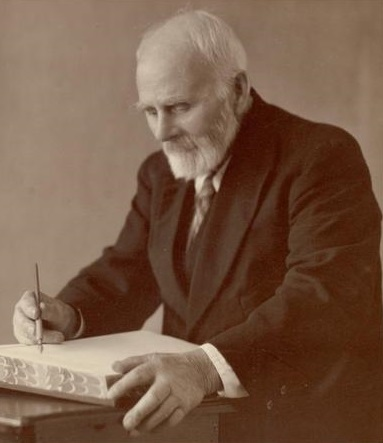
- Shumack in 1930
- Born: 1850; County Cork, Ireland
- Died: 6 April 1940 (aged 89); Peakhurst, Australia
- Occupation: farmer
- Spouse: Sarah Winter
- Children: eight

Samuel Shumack (1850 - 1940) was an early Canberra pioneer and Australian farmer. He wrote his autobiography in the 1920s and it was published in 1967 as an account of rural living in the Canberra district.

Shumack Street in Weetangera is named after his father, Richard Shumack.

== Early life ==
Samuel Shoemack, son of Richard and Anne, was baptised on 27 July 1850 at Doneraile, county Cork, Ireland. He and his family moved to Australia in 1856, escaping the Irish depression. The family sailed in the Bermondsey, arriving in Sydney on 29 August 1856. Upon arrival in Sydney, six-year-old Shumack and his family together travelled the three-week journey by horse-drawn cart to the sheep station Duntroon. At Duntroon Shumack's father, Richard Shumack, was employed for two years by Robert Campbell.

== Life in Australia ==
After two years at Duntroon, Richard Shumack took up a selection at Emu Bank (now the site of Belconnen Library). Samuel Shumack attended school at St John's Church school for six weeks before turning his attention to farming on the family property. He began work as a shepherd on his father's selection at age eight.

=== Springvale, Weetangera ===
In 1866, at age 16, Samuel Shumack took up land at "Spring Vale" in Weetangera with his father.

In 1876 Shumack and one of his relatives were convicted of illegally cutting timber on Crown lands.

Samuel Shumack married Sarah Winter (born 1871) in June 1893. The couple had eight children together. The Shumacks lived in Weetangera until 1915 when their land was resumed by the Commonwealth to become part of the Australian Capital Territory.

During his time in Weetangera, Shumack was a farmer and grazier. He was involved in local cricket, including as a member of the Ginninderra XI. He and his team frequently rode long distances to compete.

Bushfires raged at Springvale in January 1902. Shumack narrowly escaped the fires and lost many acres of grass at his property.

For a year beginning Easter 1895, and again in 1904, Shumack was elected a churchwarden at St John's, Canberra. With these years of service and others combined, all up he was a warden at the church for 30 years. By the end of his life, Shumack had worshipped at St John's for 49 years. The church honoured Shumack in 1951 by dedicated a window to his memory; the window depicted St. John the Evangelist.

=== Upper Hebden ===
In 1915, Shumack moved to Upper Hebden, near Ravensworth in the Hunter Valley.

Shumack had a fondness for books and writing, having amassed a library of over 2,000 books during his life. In 1926, Shumack wrote a letter to a favourite novelist of his, Zane Grey. The letter he received back was published in the local newspaper, the Singleton Argus. During his time in Upper Hebden, Shumack wrote his autobiography Tales and Legends of Canberra Pioneers [Australian National University Press]. The book, an account of life in rural Canberra, was published in 1967.

=== Peakhurst ===
Shumack died on 6 April 1940 at Peakhurst, where he had been living with his wife Sarah and his daughter Jemima. His body was interred at St. John's in Canberra, following a church service. Sarah died in 1954.

== Children ==
Shumack had four daughters and four sons, who are named in his obituary (not necessarily in order of birth) as: Jemima, Ruth, Clementina, Eileen, Everest, David, Heber and Stephen.

== Further reading and external links ==
- Tales and legends of Canberra Pioneers, edited by J.E and Samuel Shumack, ANU Press, Canberra, 1967 ISBN 0-7081-0725-7
- Collection of portraits of the Shumack family, Digital Collection of the National Library of Australia.
