= Charles Anderson (mineralogist) =

Australian mineralogist and palaeontologist

- Born: 5 December 1876; Stenness, United Kingdom
- Died: 25 October 1944 (aged 67); Darlinghurst, New South Wales, Australia
- Scientific career
- Fields: Paleontology

Charles Anderson (5 December 1876, Stenness – 25 October 1944 Darlinghurst, New South Wales) was an Australian mineralogist and palaeontologist. He was director of the Australian Museum from 1921 to 1940.

== Career ==
Charles Anderson was the youngest son of John Anderson of Moa, Stenness, Orkney Islands, Scotland. He had eight siblings (two brothers, six sisters). After finishing school in Stennes and Kirkwall he was matriculated at the University of Edinburgh to study chemistry, crystallography, geology, mineralogy, physics, and zoology. He also obtained distinction in English Literature, Latin, and senior mathematics. In 1898 he graduated to Master of Arts, in 1900 to Bachelor of Science and in 1908 to Doctor of Science. On 21 July 1901 he joined the Australian Museum as mineralogist. On 18 January 1902 he married Elsie Helen Robertson with whom he had two daughters and one son. He initially began his research work in morphological crystallography and the chemistry of minerals in Australia. In 1911 he visited several European museum collections whereat he reported in 1912. In 1916 he published the crystal measurements and drawings of 45 mineral species in Australia. He later concentrated on the research field of vertebrate palaeontology. When fossils of a second Meiolania species were discovered on Walpole Island, he published a revision of the whole genus in 1925. After the death of Robert Etheridge, Junior (1847–1920), Anderson was appointed director of the museum at which position he stayed until his retirement on 31 October 1940.

He was president of the Royal Society of New South Wales (1924), the Linnean Society of New South Wales (1932), the Anthropological Society of New South Wales (1930 and 1931), and the Geographical Society of New South Wales (1941 and 1942). He was among the founders of the Art Galleries and Museums Association of Australia and New Zealand, and a member of the Australian National Research Council. Additionally he was a corresponding member of the American Museum of Natural History, New York, and a corresponding member of the Zoological Society of London. He was one of the honorary secretaries of the Royal Society of New South Wales from 1935 to 1943.
