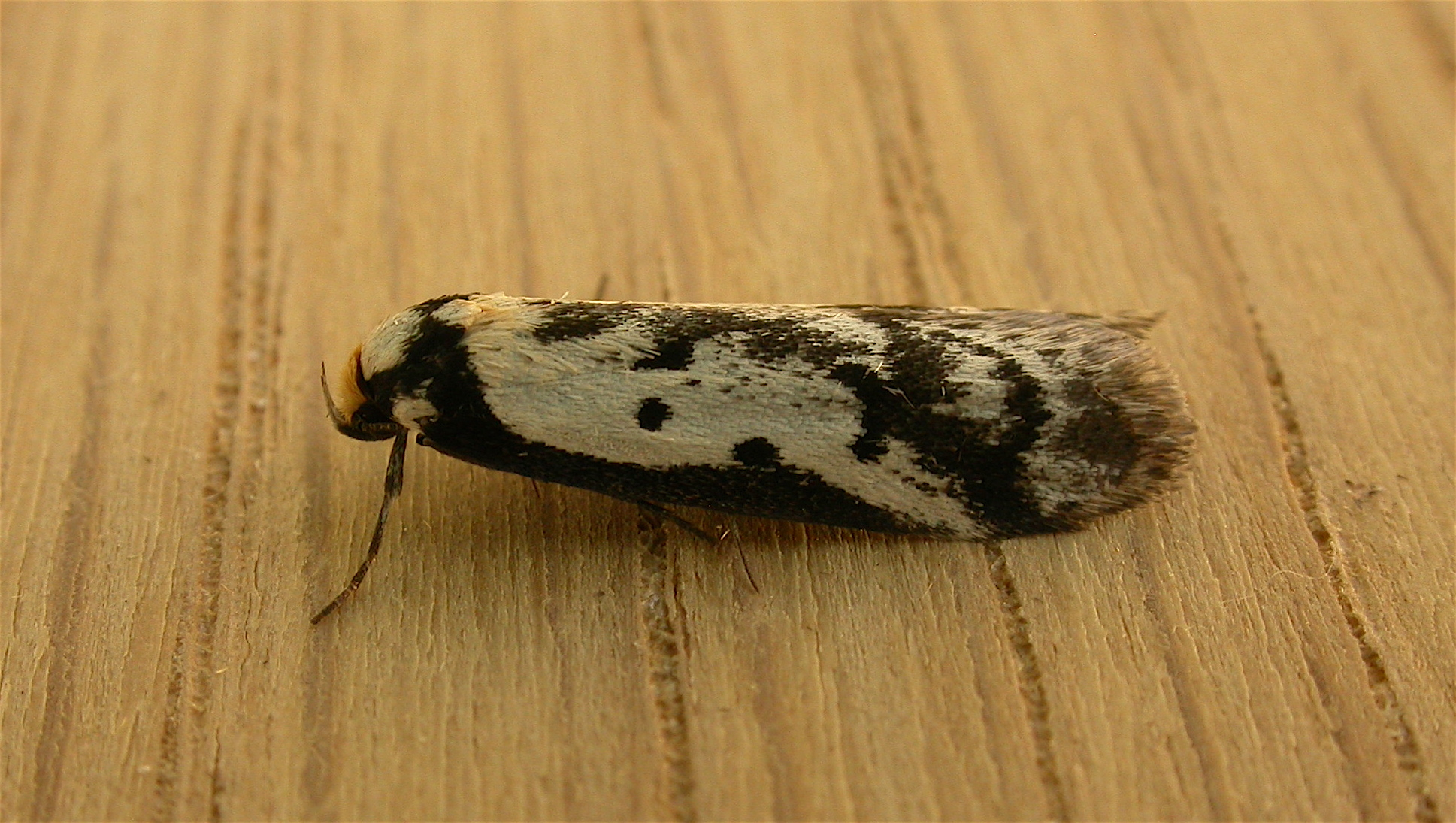

Scientific classification
- Kingdom: Animalia
- Phylum: Arthropoda
- Class: Insecta
- Order: Lepidoptera
- Family: Oecophoridae
- Genus: Philobota
- Species: P. lysizona

Binomial name
- Philobota lysizona Meyrick, 1889

= Philobota lysizona =

Species of moth

Philobota lysizona is a moth of the family Oecophoridae. It is found in Australia.
