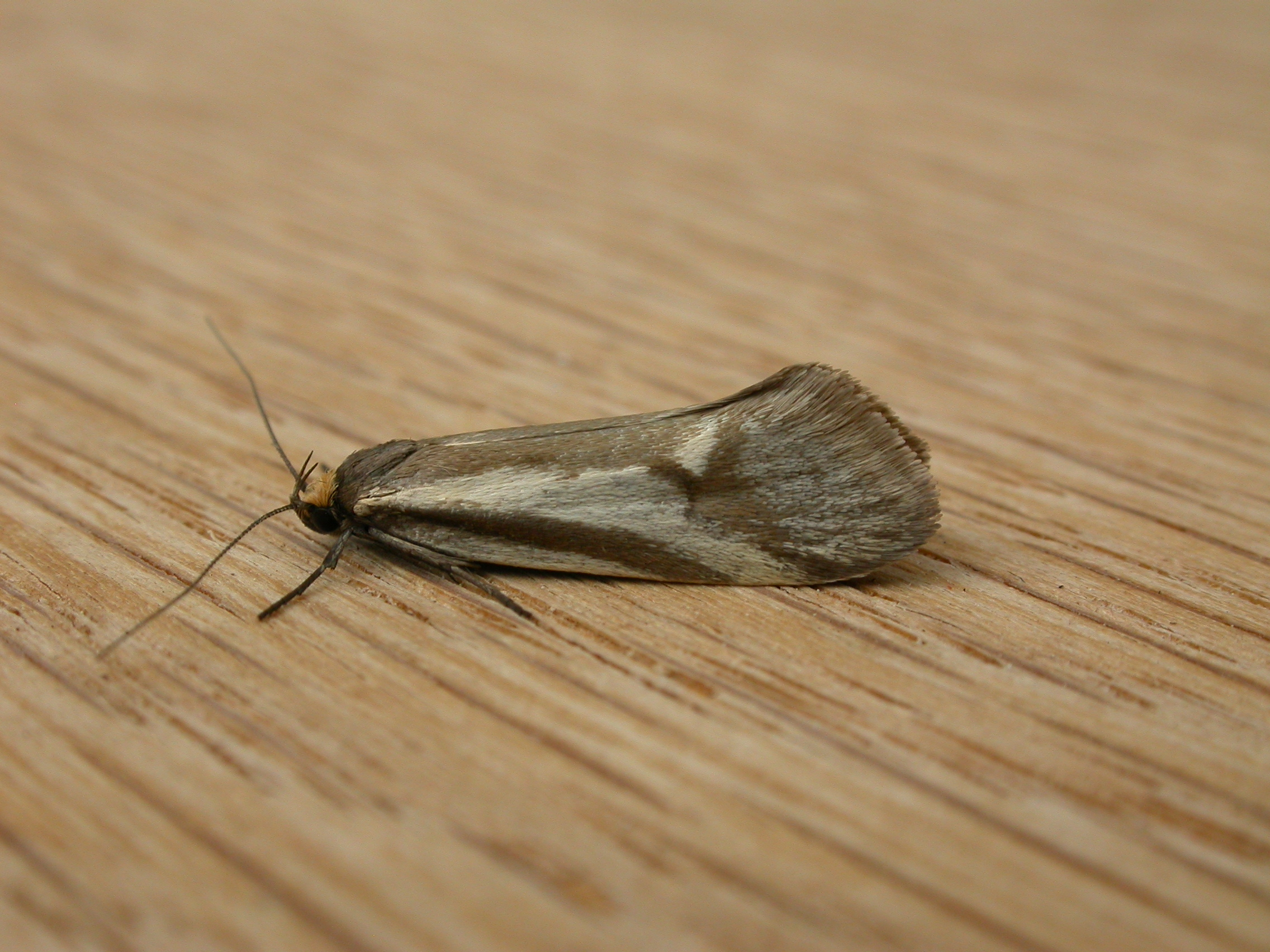

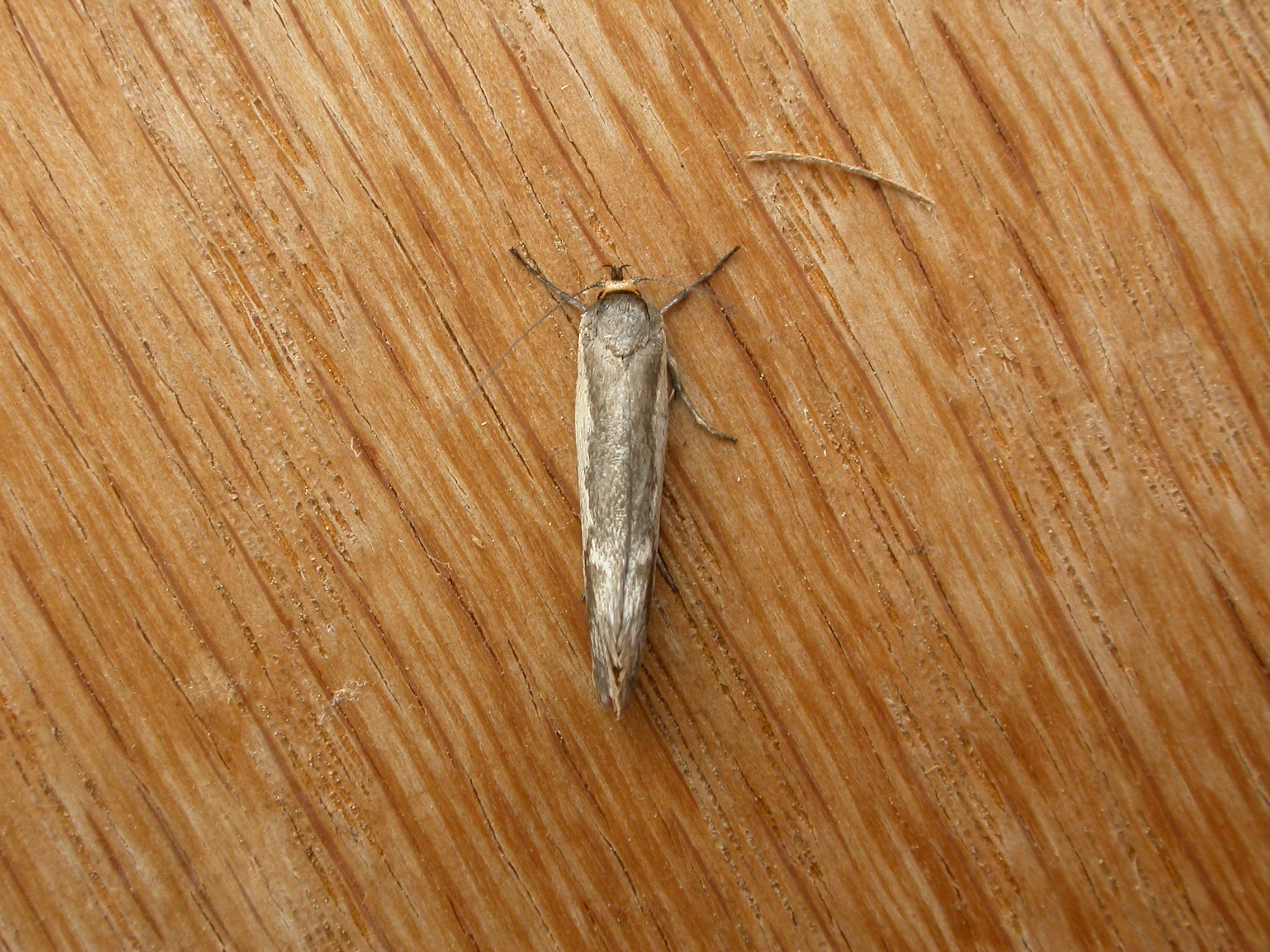

Scientific classification
- Kingdom: Animalia
- Phylum: Arthropoda
- Clade: Pancrustacea
- Class: Insecta
- Order: Lepidoptera
- Family: Oecophoridae
- Genus: Philobota
- Species: P. ellenella

Binomial name
- Philobota ellenella (Newman, 1856)

Synonyms
- Oecophora ellenella Newman, 1856; Philobota catascia Meyrick, 1884

= Philobota ellenella =

Species of moth

Philobota ellenella is a moth of the family Oecophoridae. It is known from the Australian Capital Territory, New South Wales and Victoria.
