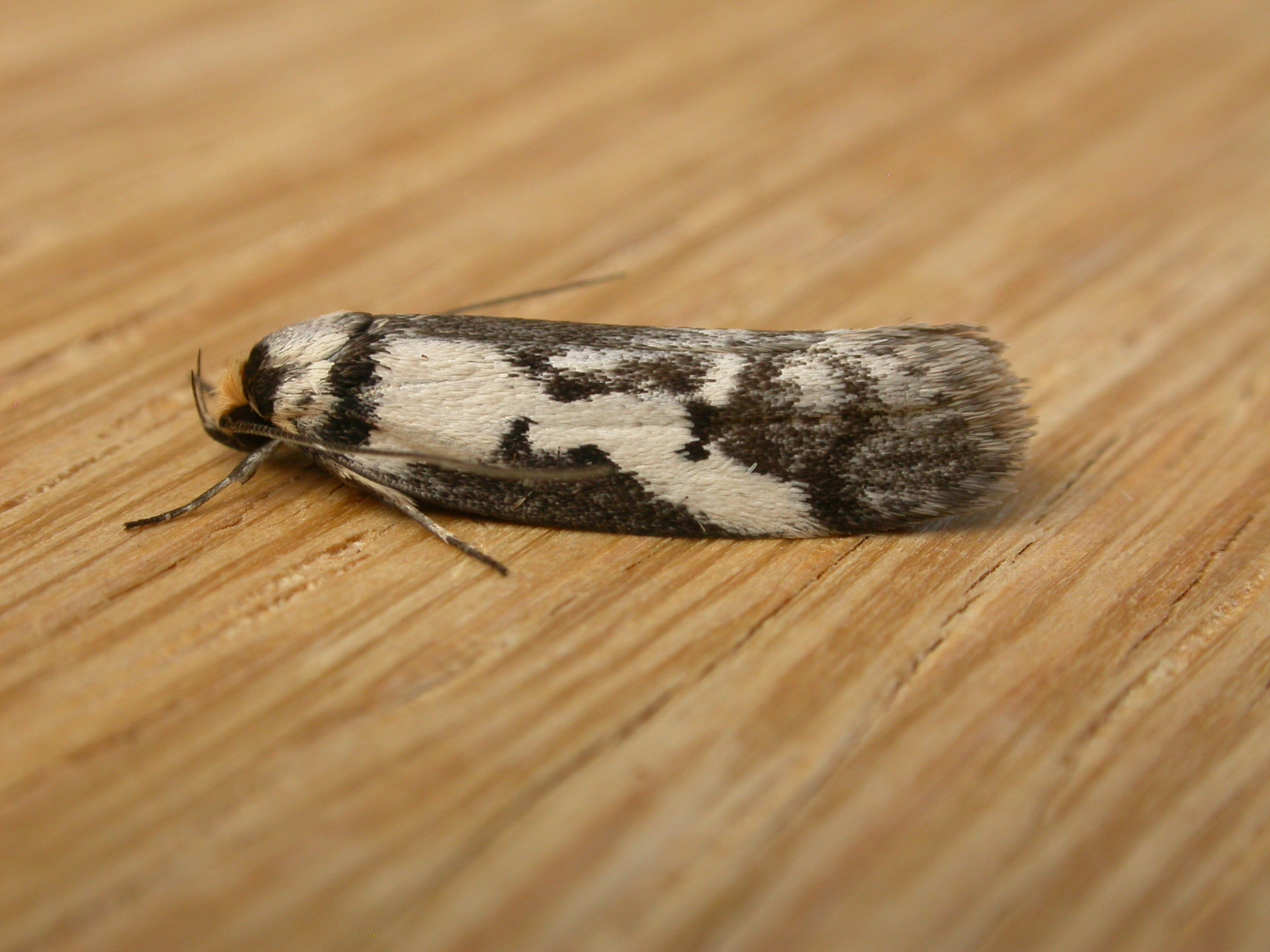

Scientific classification
- Kingdom: Animalia
- Phylum: Arthropoda
- Class: Insecta
- Order: Lepidoptera
- Family: Oecophoridae
- Genus: Philobota
- Species: P. partitella

Binomial name
- Philobota partitella Walker, 1864

= Philobota partitella =

Species of moth

Philobota partitella is a moth of the family Oecophoridae. It is found in Australia.

Its wingspan is around 20 mm.
