= Macquarie, Australian Capital Territory =

Macquarie
- Suburb
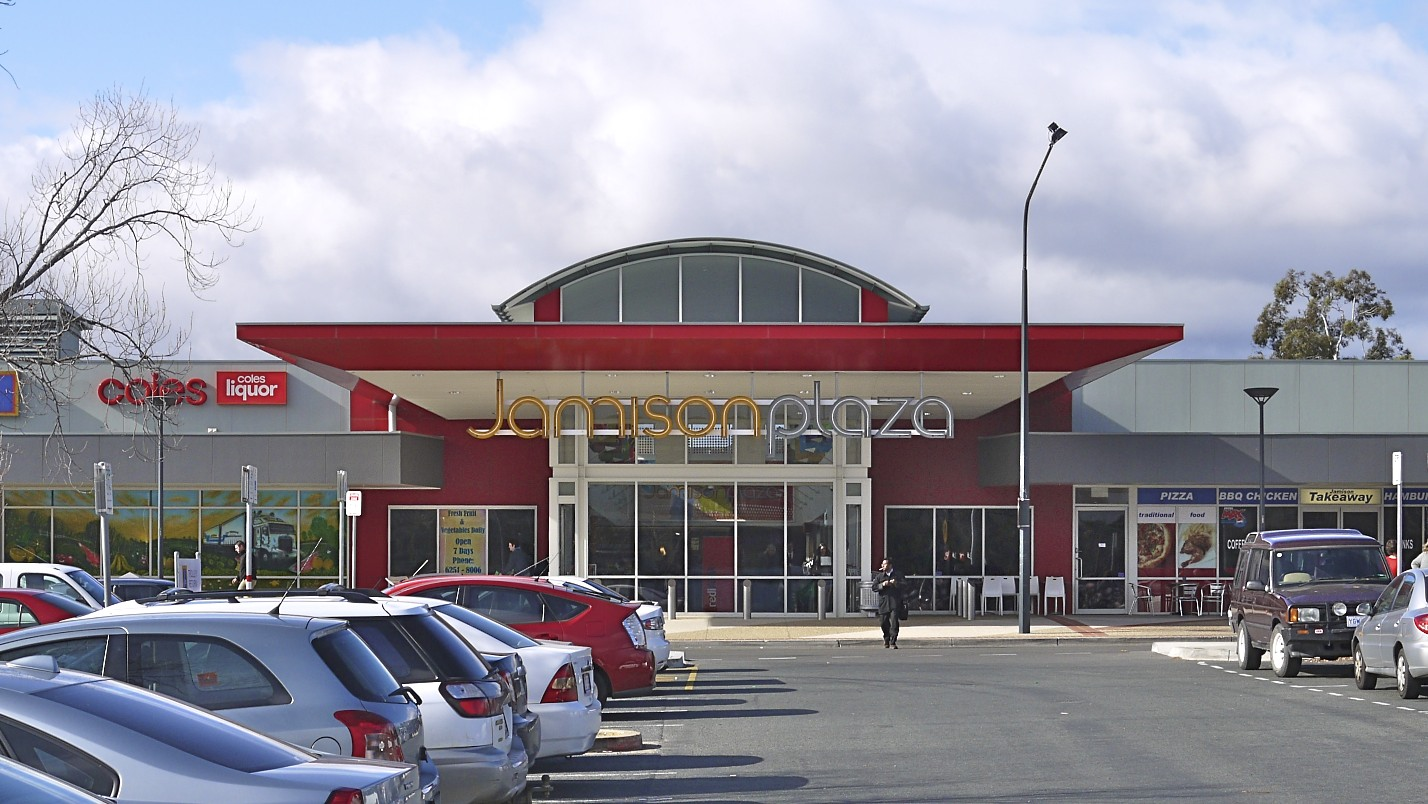
- Jamison Centre

- Coordinates: 35°15′03″S 149°03′53″E
- Country: Australia
- State: Australian Capital Territory
- City: Canberra
- District: Belconnen
- Established: 1967

Government
  - Territory electorate: Ginninderra
  - Federal division: Canberra

Area
  - Total: 1.7 km^{2} (0.66 sq mi)

Population
  - Total: 3,104 (SAL 2021)
- Postcode: 2614
Suburbs around Macquarie
Page	Belconnen	Bruce
Weetangera	Macquarie	Aranda
	Cook	Aranda

Macquarie (/ˈməkwɒri/) is a residential suburb in the Belconnen district of Canberra, located within the Australian Capital Territory, Australia. Macquarie was gazetted as a division on 22 June 1967 in recognition of Major-General Lachlan Macquarie, a former Governor of New South Wales. Streets in Macquarie are named after contemporaries of Governor Macquarie.

Macquarie is located in the inner north Canberra district of Belconnen. It is bordered to the north by Belconnen Way, Bindubi Street to the east, Redfern Street to the south and Coulter Drive to the west.

== Demographics ==
At the 2016 census, Macquarie had a population of 2,700 people. The census shows that Macquarie residents have an average age of 36 compared to a Canberra average of 35.

The population of Macquarie is predominantly Australian-born at 65.7% with the second most common birthplace being China (excluding SARs and Taiwan) at 4.0% of the population. Accommodation is predominantly separate houses (70.7%) with a gradual increase in flats, units and apartments (17.9%, slightly under the ACT and Australian averages) since previous census periods. There are a group of streets with public housing adjacent to the Jamison Centre.

== Suburb amenities ==
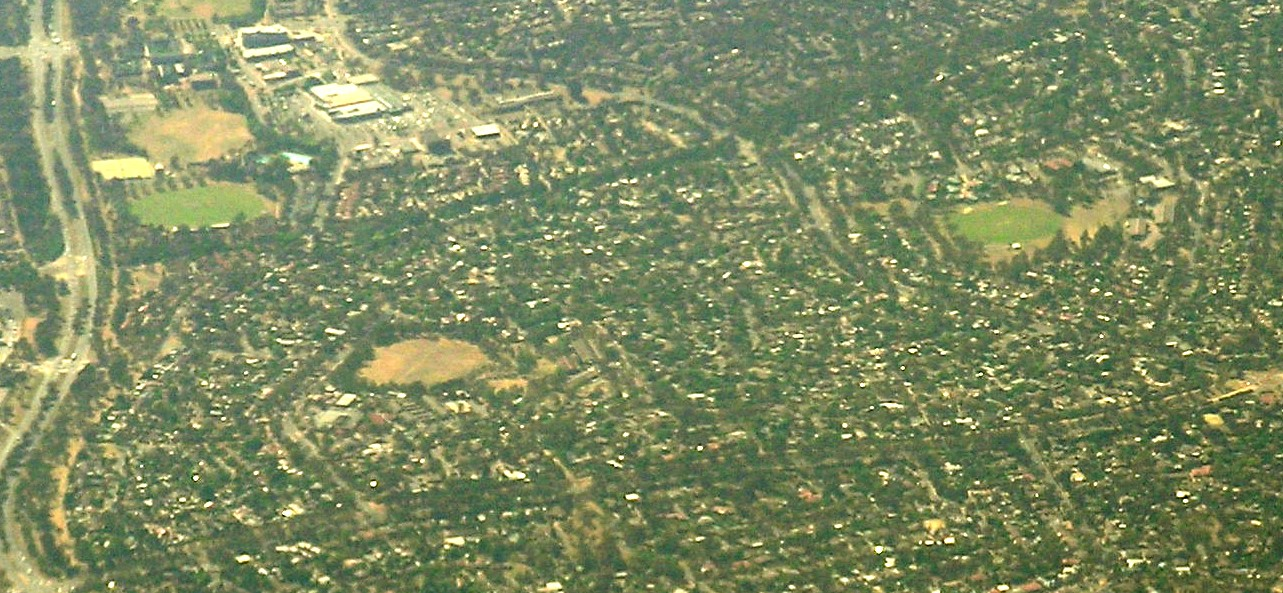
Aerial view of Macquarie, from the west.

There is a small shopping centre on Lachlan Street in Macquarie that has a Medical Centre, Chemist, Coffee Shop and Kinh Doh Vietnamese restaurant.

The Jamison Centre is the major shopping centre in Macquarie and has a popular outdoor Rotary community market every Sunday morning.

Adjacent to the Jamison Centre is Big Splash, one of Canberra's few privately owned but public swimming pools and home to Canberra's only outdoor water slide.

On the corner of Bindubi Street and Belconnen Way is the Canberra High School originally established in 1938 at Telopea Park School and then Acton from 1939 until moving to the current site when officially opened on 21 August 1972; it has large playing fields between it and the swimming pool.

Macquarie Primary School on Bennelong Crescent is a government run school established in 1968 and was the first school in Belconnen.

== Transport ==
ACTION bus route 32 connects Macquarie with Belconnen Town Centre and Civic.

== Governance ==
For the purposes of Australian federal elections for the House of Representatives, Macquarie is in the Division of Canberra.

For the purposes of Australian Capital Territory elections for the ACT Legislative Assembly, Macquarie is in the Ginninderra electorate.

== Geology ==
Greywacke from the Ordovician Pittman Formation forms a band down the east of Macquarie. This has been uplifted on the east side of the Deakin Fault. The fault heads in the north east direction in this suburb, whereas the Deakin fault normally heads in the north west direction. A porphyry of Green-grey Dacitic intrusive containing large white feldspar crystals is found under the Jamison Centre. Green grey rhyodacite of the Walker Volcanics underlie the center and west of Macquarie.

== See also ==
- History of Canberra
