= Big Splash Waterpark Canberra =

Water park in Canberra, Australia

Big Splash
- Interactive map of Big Splash
- Slogan: Splashtacular fun for all ages
- Location: Macquarie, Canberra, Australia
- Coordinates: 35.251°S 149.07°E
- Owner: Translink Management Group Pty Ltd, owned by Songnan (Morris) Huang
- Opened: 1969
- Previous names: Macquarie Swimming Pool
- Operating season: Closed
- Pools: 5 pools
- Water slides: 9 water slides
- Website: bigsplashwaterpark.com.au

Big Splash is a water park in Canberra, Australia. It is located in the suburb of Macquarie and is the only waterpark in Canberra. It opened in 1969 as a public swimming pool and became a private waterpark in the 1990s. It has remained closed since it failed to open for the summer season in 2024.

== History ==
The establishment was originally government-owned and known as "Macquarie Swimming pool", also often referred to as "Jammo Pool". The slides were introduced in the early 1980s. During the 1990s the pool was sold to the Watkins family.

The current name for the facility is "Big Splash Waterpark". Upon opening, it contained only a 50-metre (160 ft) pool and a kids pool. It now has a total of eleven water slides, which includes the Family Slide and the Kamikaze slide that extend downwards from the top of Splash Tower, The Hurricane Twins that begin at the Splash Viewing Platform. Big Splash includes a children's area called Splash Island which includes 3 slides and playing area. There was the Yellow Bubble pool for toddlers, which had two small water slides landing into shallow water. However, this was removed in the 2014/2015 season and a new playground was installed for smaller children. There is also a "Learn to Swim Pool" and a 50-metre (160 ft) Pool. Big Splash also has a dry Inflatable Obstacle Course for Children, and wet Inflatable Obstacle Courses for Adults and Children.

Following the 2010 closures of the Speedcoaster and Twister slides at Wet'n'Wild Gold Coast on the Gold Coast, Watkins personally purchased both rides for $1.5 million. The rides were installed in 2012, but red tape delayed their opening until 2013. The slides were actually purchased for a reduced price by Wet 'n Wild.

For the 2014/2015 season the longstanding historic "yellow bubble" was removed and a new toddlers playground installed. Big Splash used to run dive in movies, however frequent crowd cancellations led to its closure.

Translink Management Group Pty Ltd, owned by Songnan (Morris) Huang, bought the lease to the park in 2021 for $7.5 million.

Big Splash did not open in the 2024 season and has remained closed since.

As of November 2025, the facility is permanently closed. The park has been vandalised and there is significant damage to the infrastructure.
