= William Walford Thorpe =

Australian Anthropologist

William Walford Thorpe, (1869 - 2 September 1932) ethnologist of the Australian Museum, founding member and secretary of The Anthropological Society of New South Wales in 1928 (with Clifton Cappie Towle), and editor of the society's journal Mankind.

He married Elsie Mansfield, who bore him five sons.

He started working at the Australian Museum in 1898, in a variety of roles, including labourer, night-watchman and gallery attendant. In 1900, he became assistant to curator Robert Etheridge who played an important role in establishing the museum's anthropological collections, and in 1906, with no formal education and aged only twenty six he was appointed as the first ethnologist to the Museum where he stayed until his death in 1932.

Thorpe undertook many field trips in New South Wales in the 1920s, such as Dark Point, Newcastle, Sydney, Morna Point and Port Stephens for collecting purposes. The Thorpe Collection at the Australia Museum contains over 575 aboriginal objects that he collected and donated

He was buried at Botany Cemetery, Sydney on 6 September 1932.

== Image ==
Madden, J. William Walford Thorpe ethnologist at the Australian Museum, Sydney, ca. 1920s [picture]. ca. 1920s. 1 negative : glass, b&w; 8.3 x 10.8 cm.

== Publications ==
- The Aborigines of New South Wales, abridged, for the most part, from Dr John Fraser's work [The aborigines of New South Wales] Edward Lee & Company, 1914
- 'List of New South Wales Aboriginal place names and their meanings / compiled by W.W. Thorpe 2nd ed.Published: Sydney : Australian Museum, 1927
