= Pterostylis macrosepala =

Scientific classification
- Kingdom: Plantae
- Clade: Tracheophytes
- Clade: Angiosperms
- Clade: Monocots
- Order: Asparagales
- Family: Orchidaceae
- Subfamily: Orchidoideae
- Tribe: Cranichideae
- Genus: Pterostylis
- Species: P. macrosepala

Binomial name
- Pterostylis macrosepala (D.L.Jones) G.N.Backh.

Synonyms
- Bunochilus macrosepalus D.L.Jones

Species of orchid

Pterostylis macrosepala is a plant in the orchid family Orchidaceae and is endemic to the central-west slopes of New South Wales. As with similar greenhoods, plants in flower differ from those that are not flowering. Non-flowering plants have a rosette of leaves flat on the ground, but those that are flowering have up to eight translucent green flowers with narrow, dark green stripes and up to ten stem leaves.

== Description ==
Pterostylis macrosepala, is a terrestrial, perennial, deciduous, herb with an underground tuber. Non-flowering plants have a rosette of between three and five, egg-shaped to lance-shaped leaves, each leaf 10–30 mm (0.4–1 in) long and 5–10 mm (0.2–0.4 in) wide with a petiole up to 8 mm (0.3 in) long. Plants that are flowering lack a rosette but have up to eight flowers on a flowering spike 200–600 mm (8–20 in) high with between five and ten linear to lance-shaped stem leaves that are 20–60 mm (0.8–2 in) long and 3–7 mm (0.1–0.3 in) wide. The flowers are 16–20 mm (0.6–0.8 in) long, 10–12 mm (0.4–0.5 in) wide and the dorsal sepal and petals are joined to form a hood called the "galea" over the column. The galea is translucent green with dark green stripes. The lateral sepals turn downwards and are 15–18 mm (0.6–0.7 in) long, 10–12 mm (0.4–0.5 in) wide and joined for more than half their length. The labellum is 7–8 mm (0.28–0.31 in) long, about 3 mm (0.1 in) wide and pale green with a blackish stripe along its mid-line. Flowering occurs from July to September.

== Taxonomy and naming ==
Pterostylis macrosepala was first formally described in 2006 by David Jones and given the name Bunochilus macrosepalus. The description was published in Australian Orchid Research from a specimen collected in the Conimbla National Park. In 2010, Gary Backhouse changed the name to Pterostylis macrosepala. The specific epithet (macrosepala) is derived from the Ancient Greek word makros meaning "long" and the Neo-Latin word sepalum meaning "sepal", referring to the large fused sepals.

== Distribution and habitat ==
This greenhood is only known from the Conimbla Range where it grows in open forest.
