= Australian Anthropological Society =

Professional association of Australian anthropologists

The Australian Anthropological Society (AAS) is the professional association representing anthropologists in Australia.

== History ==
The Australian Anthropological Society is a recently formed organization, founded in 1973 "to promote the advancement of anthropology as a discipline" There were, however, precursor anthropological associations in Australia including the Anthropological Society of New South Wales. In 1956 an Australian Branch of the Association of Social Anthropologists of the British Commonwealth was formed. This was followed in 1969 by the Australian Association of Social Anthropologists. The current Australian Anthropological Society was formed in 1973 and incorporated under NSW legislation in that year.

== Goal and activities ==
The goals of the Society are to promote the advancement of anthropology as a professional discipline grounded in the systematic pursuit of knowledge, to promote its responsible use in the service of humankind, and to promote professional training and practice in anthropology. AAS supports the development of the discipline in university departments and schools at graduate and post-graduate level. Through an annual conference, an academic journal (The Australian Journal of Anthropology - originally published as Mankind, a regular newsletter, an active listserv and online publications, the Society provides forums where anthropologists can engage in debates central to anthropological theory and practice.

== Membership ==
In 1987 the Society adopted a two-tiered level of membership, as part of a strategy to strengthen the professionalization of anthropology in Australia. An ordinary member of the Society is expected to hold an Honours degree in anthropology or the equivalent. A fellow is expected to hold a research higher degree in anthropology, that is, a research master's degree or PhD, or the equivalent.

== Governance ==
The affairs of AAS are conducted by an Executive drawn from the membership of the Society. The AAS also operates under a Constitution which may only amended through the vote of the membership.

== Affiliations and subgroups ==
The Society is affiliated with the Council of Humanities and Social Sciences and with the World Conferences of Anthropological Associations. Within the Society there different sub-groups representing specialist areas of anthropological research. There is also an association of student members of the Society, the Australian Network of Student Anthropologists.
