= Aranda, Australian Capital Territory =

Aranda
- Suburb
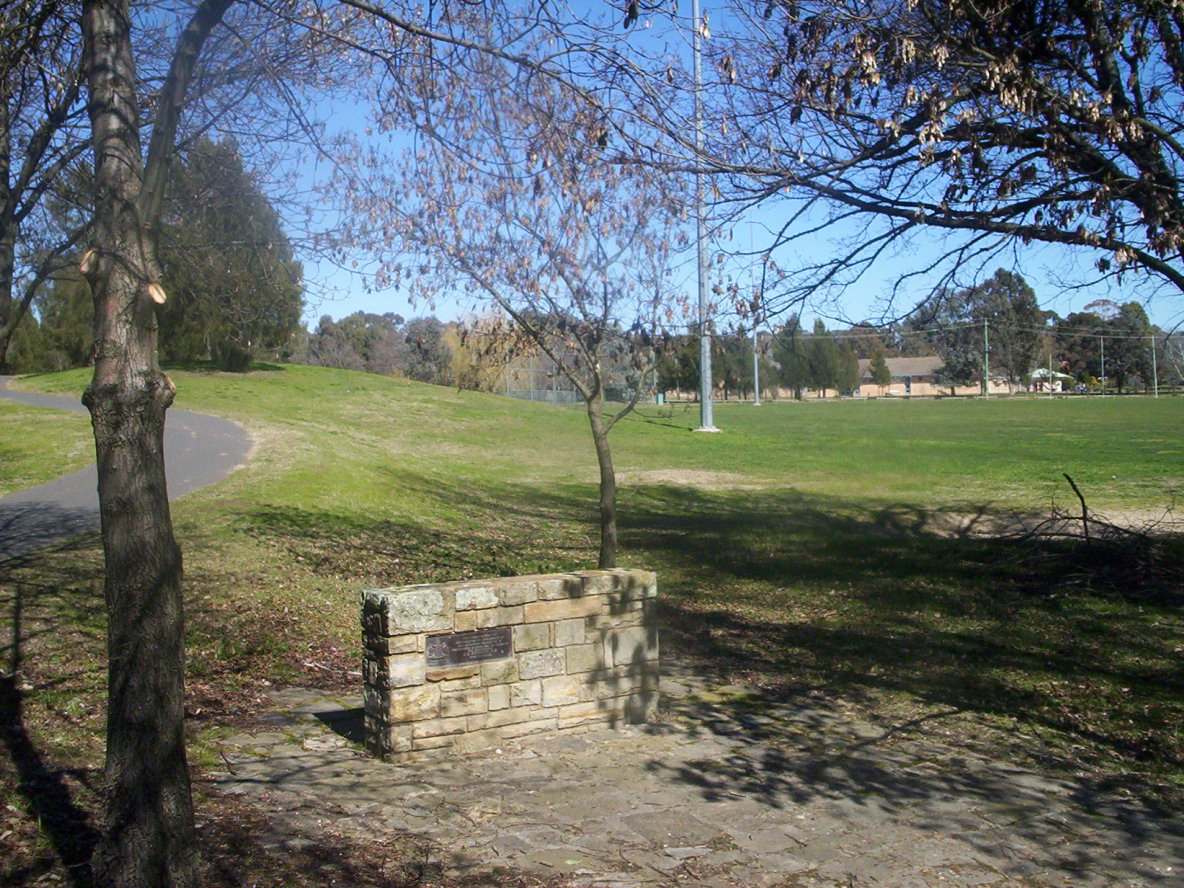
- A plaque at Aranda playing fields marks the start of the development of Aranda in 1966

- Coordinates: 35°15′30″S 149°04′48″E
- Country: Australia
- State: Australian Capital Territory
- City: Canberra
- District: Belconnen

Government
  - Territory electorate: Ginninderra
  - Federal division: Canberra

Area
  - Total: 1.6 km^{2} (0.62 sq mi)

Population
  - Total: 2,605 (SAL 2021)
- Postcode: 2614
- Gazetted: 22 June 1967
Suburbs around Aranda
Belconnen	Bruce	Canberra Nature Park
Macquarie; Cook	Aranda	Black Mountain
Canberra Nature Park	Canberra Nature Park	Black Mountain

Aranda (/ˈərændə/) is a suburb in the district of Belconnen, in the Australian capital city of Canberra. Located at the western foot of Black Mountain and bounded on two sides by nature park, the suburb is characterised by its bush setting. During the planning and development of the suburb, a large proportion of large native trees – predominantly eucalypts – were left in place.

The suburb derives its name from the Arrernte tribe of Central Australia, previously known as Arunta, which means 'White Cockatoo'. The streets in Aranda are named after Aboriginal tribal groups from around Australia. The suburb comprises an area of 160ha and in 1967 was the first suburb in Belconnen to be settled.

A small plaque at the Aranda District playing fields, near the suspension bridge over Belconnen Way, commemorates the establishment of the suburb as the first development in the Belconnen district.It reads:

This tablet marks the inauguration of development of the district of Belconnen by the Minister of State for the Interior The Honourable J. D. Anthony, M.P. 23 June 1966

== Location ==
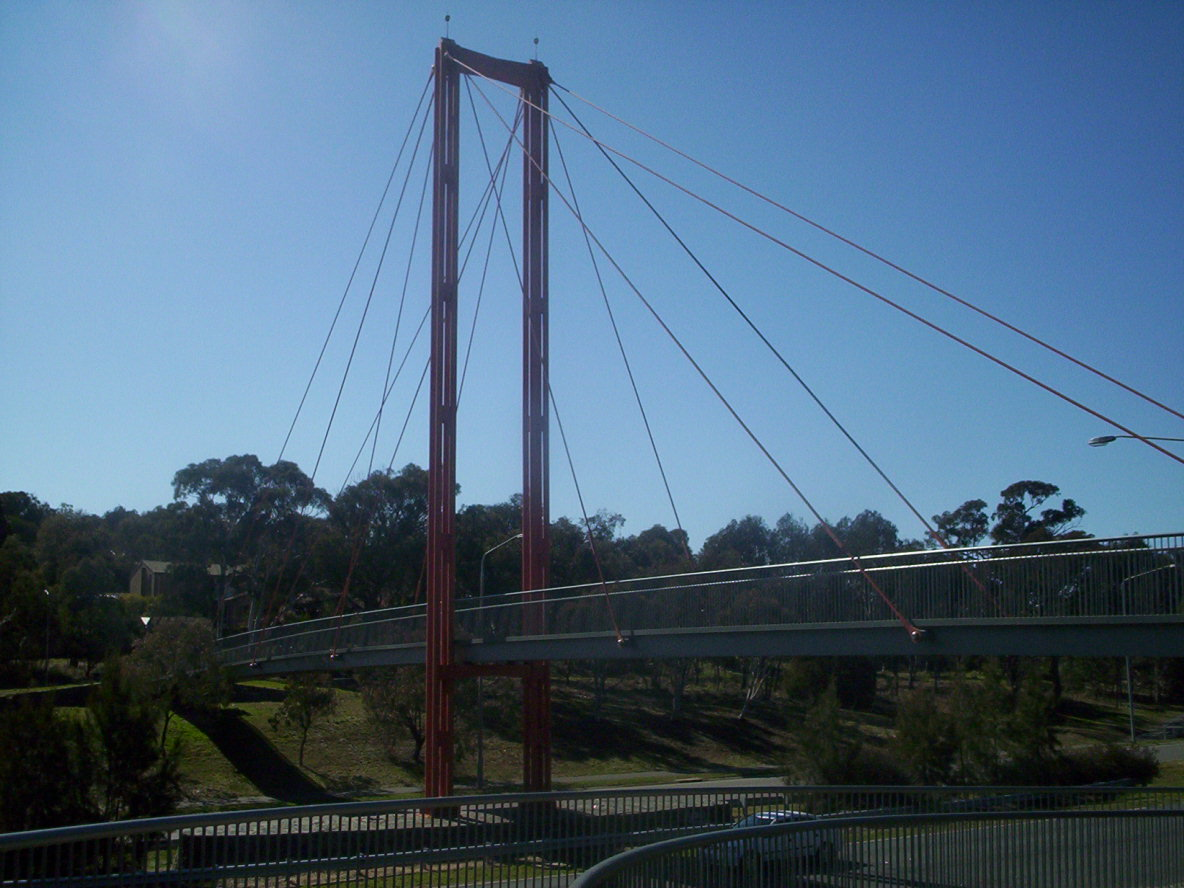
Suspension footbridge over Belconnen Way connecting Aranda with Bruce.

Aranda is located in the south east of Belconnen. It is bounded by Caswell Drive on the east, separating the suburb from Black Mountain Nature Park, Belconnen Way to the north, Bindubi Street to the west and Aranda Bushland to the south. A pedestrian bridge crossing the six-lane Belconnen Way connects the suburb with the suburb of Bruce to the north. The suburbs of Cook and Macquarie are located to Aranda's west on the opposite side of Bindubi Street.

Aranda is located 4 km to the west of Civic along Belconnen Way. Bandjalong Crescent, a curved bell shaped street is the main street passing through the suburb, connecting Caswell Drive with Bindubi Street. A number of community facilities are located in the centre of the curve.

== Transport ==
A bicycle path along Bindubi Street connects Aranda with the Canberra bike path network. A walking path runs through a reserve along the spine of the suburb and connects with the footbridge to the suburb of Bruce. A walking track over Black Mountain connects Aranda with the CSIRO and the Australian National University.

Aranda is served by ACTION bus route 32 which connects to Civic via Barry Drive and to Belconnen Town Centre via Cook and Macquarie. Buses to/from Belconnen also stop at or near Calvary Hospital, located in Bruce but easily accessible from Aranda by crossing Belconnen Way at the Haydon Drive T-intersection.

== Facilities ==
A number of community facilities are located close to one another near the intersections of Bandjalong and Bindel Streets. These include two primary schools (Aranda Primary School and St. Vincent's Catholic school), two churches and a pre-school.

Aranda has a local set of shops. The Aranda shops were left vacant for many years but have recently been leased, a cafe and bar has opened, with outdoor seating. The nearby Jamison Centre in neighbouring Macquarie services the area on a much larger scale, including supermarkets, retail and medical outlets, banks and cafes.

A number of playing fields are located in the north western corner of the suburb including baseball and soccer fields, as is a Scout hall. A nursing home was located on Bindel Street, but it closed in 2015.

The Belconnen Ambulance and Fire & Rescue Station, a co-located facility, opened in September 2016 with their former premises in the nearby suburb of Belconnen closing.

== Community activity ==
The Aranda Residents Group (ARG) is association number A03227 on the ACT register of "Incorporated Associations". It is active in representing the interests of its residents on such major planning issues as the Gungahlin Drive Extension, residential development issues, the Emergency Services Station on Aranda Oval (opened 2016), and redevelopment of the Aranda Shops.

The Gungahlin Drive Extension, completed in 2011, is a four lane road connecting Gungahlin Drive in Gungahlin with Parkes Way near Lake Burley Griffin. The road follows the route of Caswell Drive, separating Black Mountain reserve from Aranda.

== Governance ==
For the purposes of Australian federal elections for the House of Representatives, Aranda is in the Division of Canberra.

For the purposes of Australian Capital Territory elections for the ACT Legislative Assembly, Aranda is in the Ginninderra electorate.

== Geology ==
Aranda is built on top of rocks from the Pittman Formation. These are from the upper Ordovician Age. Mostly the rocks are greywacke formed on a continental slope, but also have bands of the Acton Shale Member, a grey to black laminated shale. The Acton Shale contains graptolites. The Deakin Fault cuts through the south west of the Aranda Bushland. South west of the fault is Silurian age Mount Painter Volcanics tuff and ashstone.
