= The Australian Journal of Anthropology =

Journal

- Discipline: Anthropology
- Language: English
- Edited by: Martha Macintyre

Publication details
- Former name: Mankind
- History: 1931-present
- Publisher: Wiley-Blackwell on behalf of the Australian Anthropological Society.
- Frequency: Triannually
- Impact factor: 0.571 (2011)

Standard abbreviations
- ISO 4: Aust. J. Anthropol.

Indexing
- ISSN: 1035-8811 (print); 1757-6547 (web)

Links
- Journal homepage; Online access; Online archive

The Australian Journal of Anthropology is a peer-reviewed academic journal published triannually by Wiley-Blackwell on behalf of the Australian Anthropological Society. The journal was established in 1931 as Mankind and obtained its current name in 1990. The journal covers anthropological topics including theoretically focused analyses and ethnographic reports in the Pacific and Asian regions neighbouring Australia.

According to the Journal Citation Reports, the journal has a 2011 impact factor of 0.571, ranking it 43rd out of 81 journals in the category "Anthropology".
