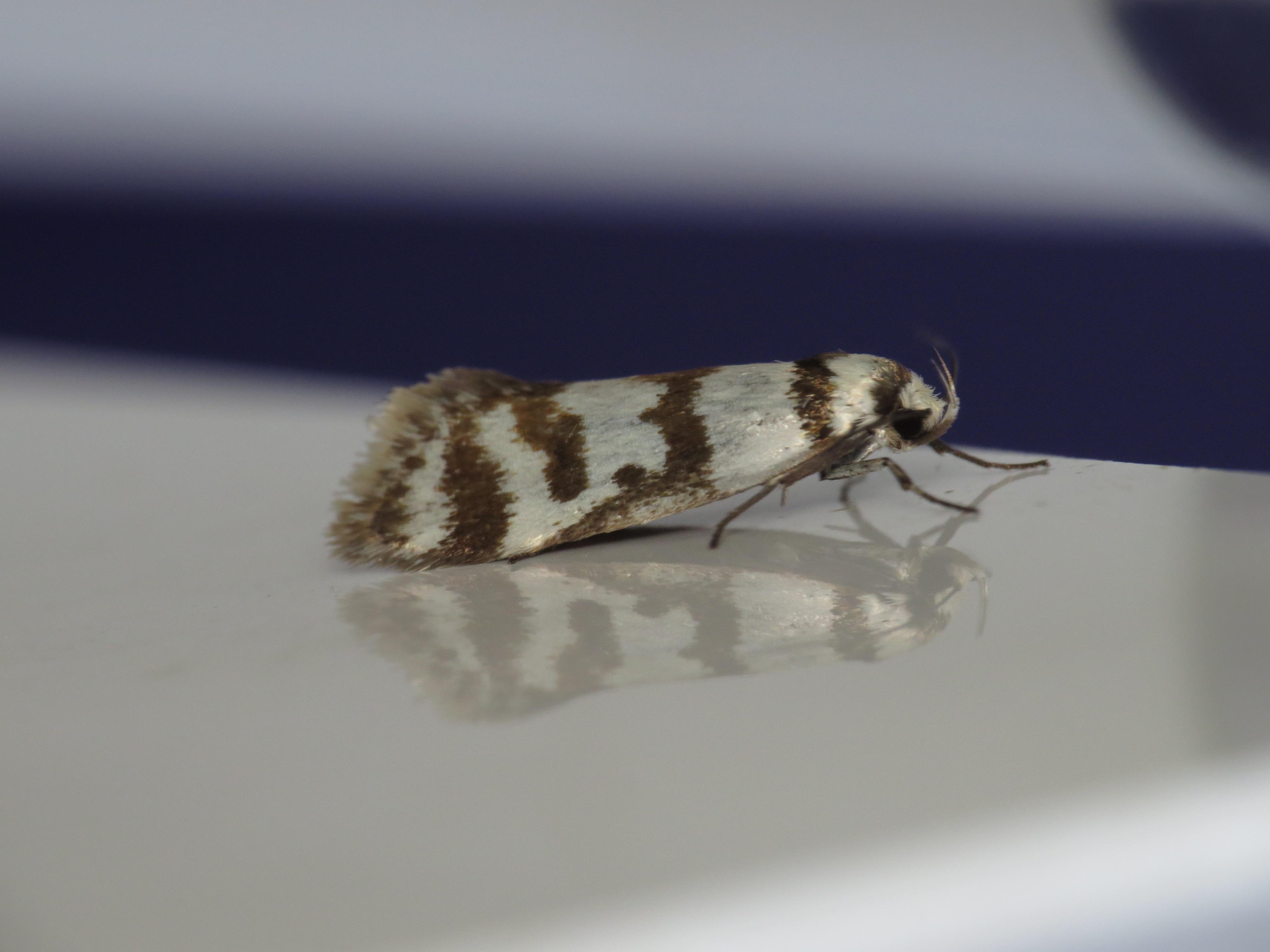
- Philobota impletella

Scientific classification
- Kingdom: Animalia
- Phylum: Arthropoda
- Class: Insecta
- Order: Lepidoptera
- Family: Oecophoridae
- Genus: Philobota; Meyrick, 1883

Diversity
- More than 200 species

= Philobota =

Genus of moths

Philobota is a genus of concealer moths in the family Oecophoridae erected by Edward Meyrick in 1883. There are more than 200 described species in Philobota. They are found predominantly in Australia.

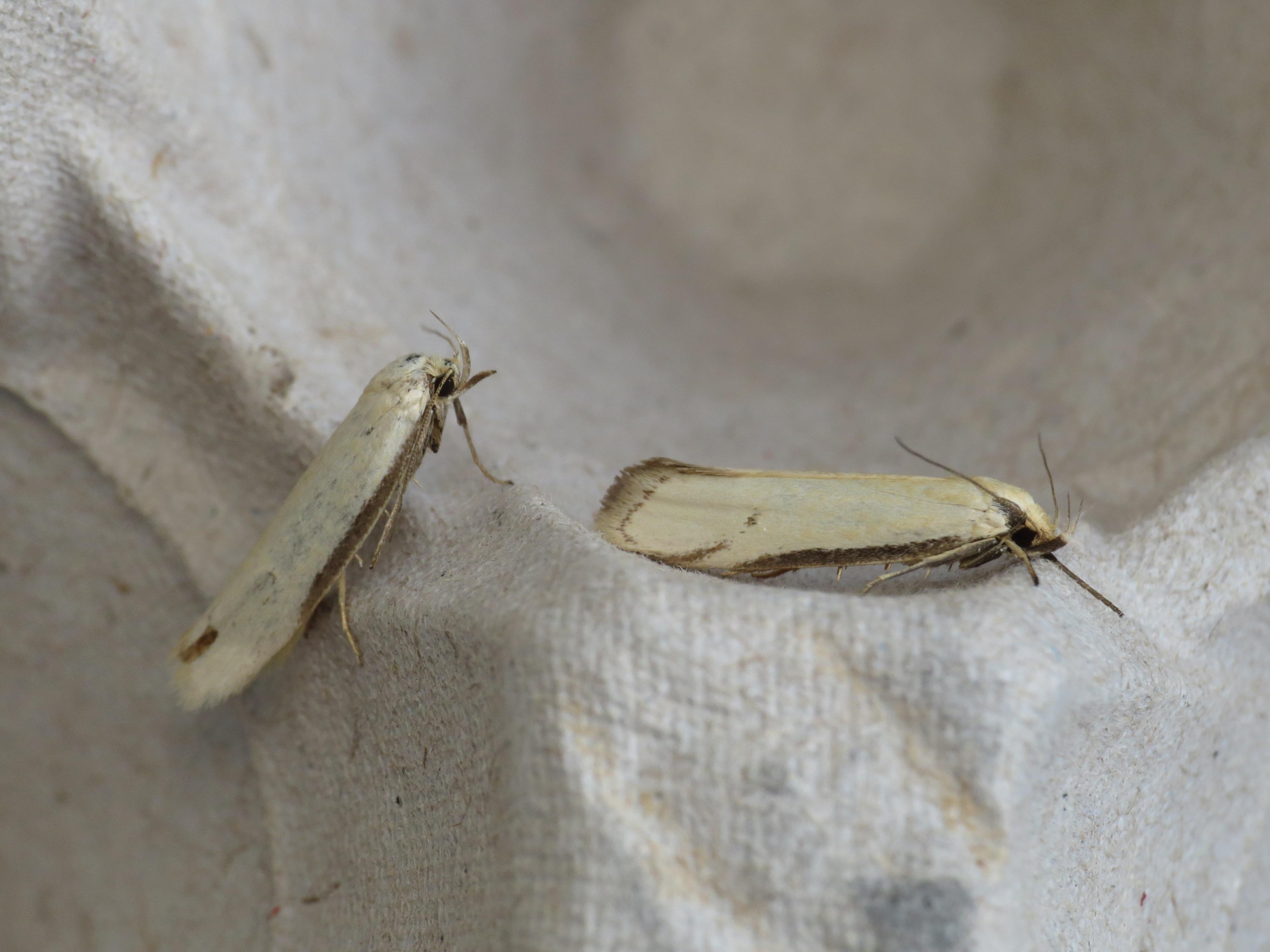
Philobota latifissella

== See also ==
- List of Philobota species
