= Road infrastructure in Canberra =

== Road classification ==
=== Route numbers ===
The ACT generally does not number its highway and freeway grade roads; those that are numbered, are interstate highways and their connecting roads. The ACT has introduced the NSW alpha-numeric route system for these thoroughfares. The new system was implemented in 2013 at the same time as NSW completed its own transition to alphanumeric numbering.

=== Road hierarchy ===
The ACT classifies its roads into four groups, depending on its physical properties and role within the road network:

==== Arterial roads ====
These roads serve long distance travellers within or between districts, and support large volumes of traffic. They may be limited access, or controlled-access. A small number of these roads have relatively high levels of property access due to city design requirements at the time.

==== Major collector roads ====
These roads serve local area traffic distributing to or from minor collector roads, and also link to the arterial network. Well designed property access is permissible.

==== Minor collector roads ====
These roads serve neighbourhood traffic, and provide access from the major collector roads into residential areas. Normal direct property access is permissible at this level. Secondary links to the arterial network are possible.

==== Access streets ====
These streets are the lowest road type in the hierarchy, and provide access to the bulk of residential homes.

== List of major roadways in the ACT ==
=== Controlled-access roads ===
Controlled-access roads in the ACT are often known as parkways either by name, or at some stage during their development, these generally (but not always) travel through peripheral areas between urbanised regions.

- Majura Parkway
- Gungahlin Drive Extension – John Dedman Parkway during planning stage
- Capital Circle
- Parkes Way^{*} – controlled-access western extension known as the Molonglo Parkway during planning stage
- Tuggeranong Parkway
- Adelaide Avenue
- Yarra Glen – Woden Parkway during planning stage

^{*}Partially limited-access

=== Limited-access roads ===
- Athllon Drive
- Barry Drive
- Barton Highway
- Belconnen Way
- Canberra Avenue
- Commonwealth Avenue
- Constitution Avenue
- Drakeford Drive
- Fairbairn Avenue
- Federal Highway
- Ginninderra Drive
- Gungahlin Drive
- Hindmarsh Drive
- Isabella Drive
- Kings Avenue
- Kings Highway
- Limestone Avenue
- Majura Road
- Monaro Highway^{^} – controlled-access northern extension known as the Eastern Parkway during planning stage
- Northbourne Avenue
- State Circle
- Tharwa Drive
- William Hovell Drive
- Vernon Circle
- Yamba Drive

^{^}Partially controlled-access

=== Major Interchanges ===
- Glenloch Interchange

=== Tourist Drives ===
The ACT previously had 7 colour coded and themed tourist drives explore the city and nearby bushland. While some signs remain, tourist drives have been officially decommissioned in the ACT.

- Tourist Drive 1
- Tourist Drive 2
- Tourist Drive 3
- Tourist Drive 4
- Tourist Drive 5
- Tourist Drive 6
- Tourist Drive 7

Canberra is also the southern terminus of the Remembrance Driveway, which is a system of arboreal parks, plantations, and road-side rest areas dedicated to former and current members of the Australian Defence Force. There are also memorial parks and rest areas along the route which honour Australia's Victoria Cross recipients.

== Traffic signals ==
In Canberra, traffic signals use the Sydney Coordinated Adaptive Traffic System, known locally as Canberra Automated Traffic Signal System (CATSS).

In 2011, improvements were made to traffic light phasing on Northbourne Avenue to reduce waiting time for people walking. The number of pedestrians crossing against the red signal dropped by a third.

In September 2011, Roads ACT agreed to progressively convert pedestrian signals auto-start some locations.

In December 2011 Roads ACT was asked by advocates to give pedestrians more green time at the intersection of Melrose and Hindmarsh Drives in Woden, and David and Wattle Streets in Lyneham.

== See also ==
- Highways in Australia for highways in other states and territories
- List of highways in Australia for roads named as highways, but not necessarily classified as highways
