= Acton Tunnel =

Road tunnel in Acton, Australian Capital Territory

Coordinates: 35.286722°S 149.116807°E

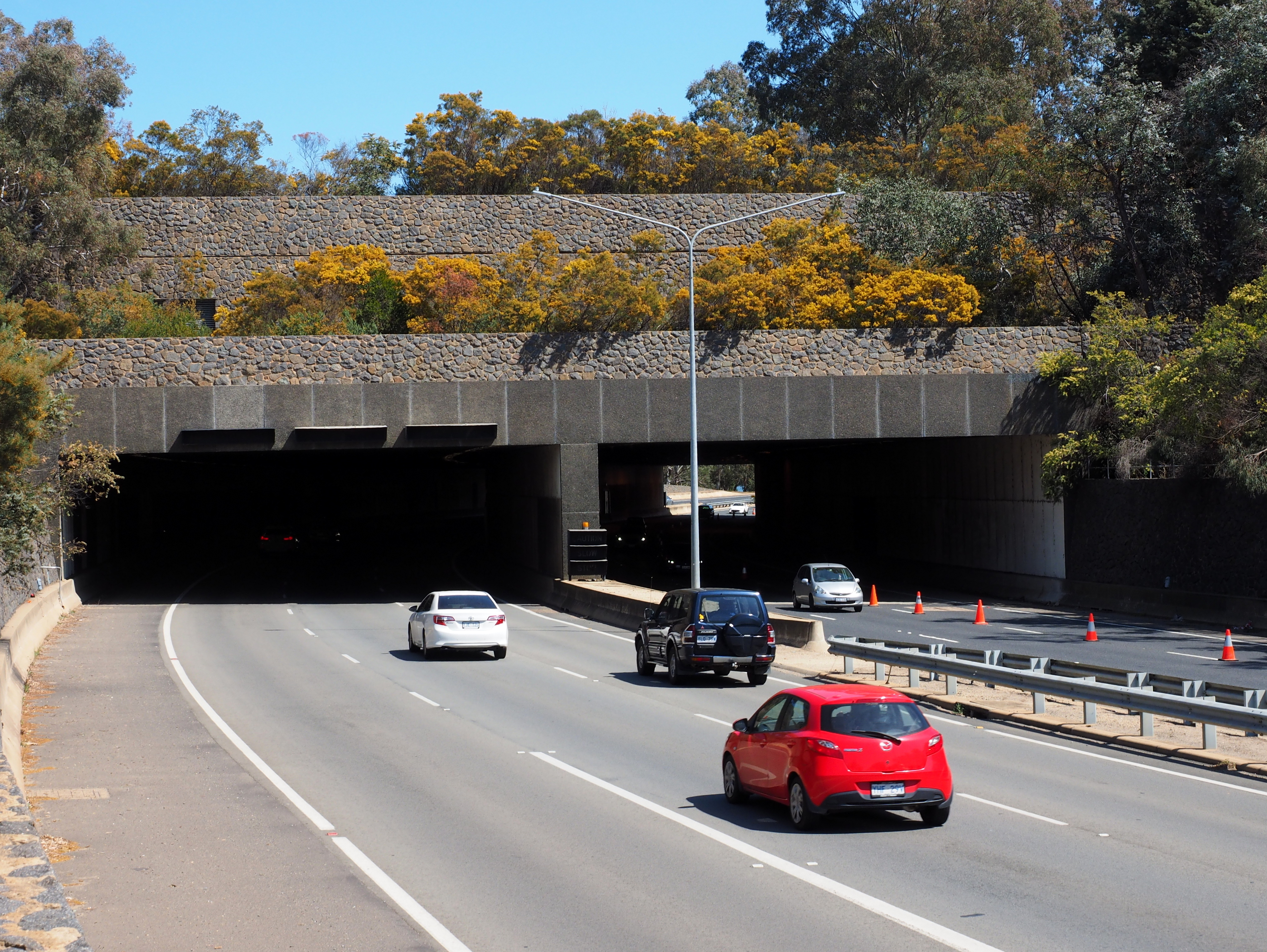
- The eastern entrance to the Acton Tunnel
- Interactive map of Acton Tunnel

Overview
- Route: Parkes Way

Operation
- Opened: 17 October 1979
- Traffic: Road

Acton Tunnel is a short road tunnel in Acton, Australian Capital Territory which opened in 1979. It carries the dual carriageway Parkes Way under a hill. The tunnel also comprises two upper levels, which have been used as an archival repository and car park by the Australian National University (ANU).

== History ==
The Acton Tunnel was first proposed in the 1960s as part of long-term planning for Canberra's road network. It was to form part of an extension of Parkes Way to Queanbeyan via Canberra Airport. The tunnel would also form part of the construction of what became the Tuggeranong Parkway, which provided a link between the Woden Valley and Civic.

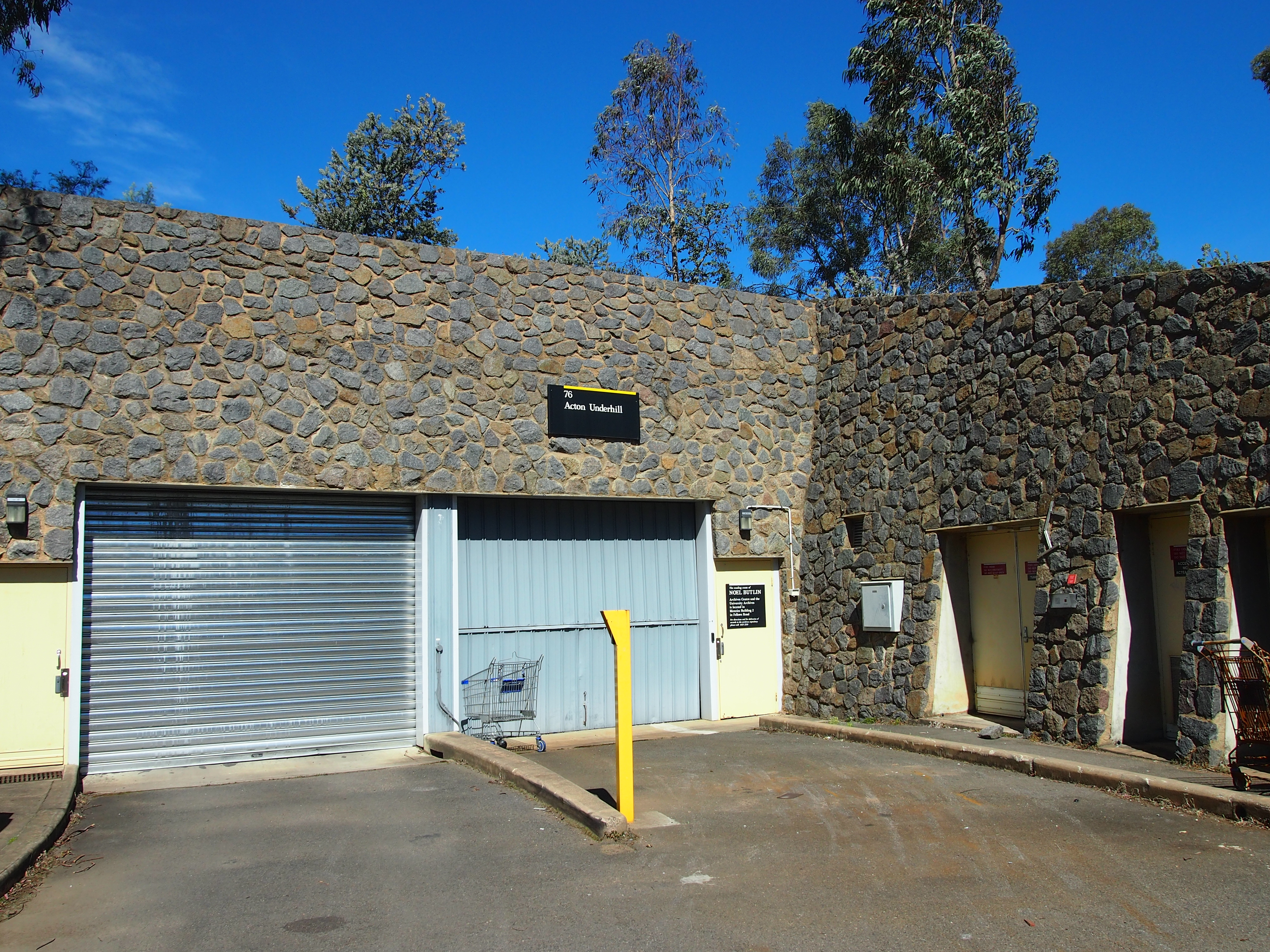
The entrance to the upper levels of the tunnel in 2012

The construction of the Acton Tunnel formed part of a major upgrade to Canberra's roads. This comprised the construction of a new highway segment which connected the Tuggeranong Parkway to Parkes Way and Caswell Drive. The upgrade also comprised the Glenloch Interchange and Lakeside Interchange. Construction of this new network began in 1976. The Acton Tunnel and other elements of the new roads opened on 17 October 1979. The tunnel cost $A7 million to build.

The tunnel comprises three levels. The lowest level carries Parkes Way, and is about 5 metres (16 ft) high. The two upper levels were originally designed to be used as a car park for 300 vehicles by the ANU. The University contributed $A200,000 to the tunnel's construction for this purpose. By the time the tunnel opened, the ANU had decided to use this space to store elements of its archives of business and labour in Australia. As these records had a higher structural load than cars, only half of the facility could be used for this purpose. These records, which were named the Noel Butlin Archives Centre, opened in 1981. As of 2019, part of the facility was being used as a parking station.

In September 1980 a section of the roof of the tunnel at the eastern end of the west-bound lanes was found to be sagging and required immediate repairs. A Labor member of the ACT House of Assembly attributed this issue to faults with the tunnel's design and inadequate supervision of its construction by the National Capital Development Commission.

A truck carrying an excavator collided with the roof of the Acton Tunnel on 20 October 2015. This accident damaged around 60 metres (200 ft) of the tunnel's roof. Repairs to the tunnel were completed on 22 October 2016, with the cost of the work having been covered by insurance. The truck driver was fined $3,000 for exceeding the tunnel's height limit, and was reported to have retained his job.

== See also ==
- List of tunnels in Australia
