= Oakey Hill =

Hill in Australian Capital Territory, Australia

Coordinates: 35°20′16″S 149°04′05″E

Oakey Hill is a hill near Canberra, Australian Capital Territory. It rises 80 metres (260 ft) above the adjacent south Canberra suburbs of Lyons, Curtin and Weston, and its 66 hectares (163 acres) is one of 33 areas which form Canberra Nature Reserve. The highest point of the hill, 684 metres above sea level, is marked by a survey station.

The hill's name is thought to come from the stands of sheoak (Allocasuarina verticillata) growing on the hill, mainly on the eastern side.

About half of Oakey Hill is open space with a mix of native and exotic grasses, while the remainder is bushland with stands of native eucalypts including yellow box and Blakely's red gum.

A number of walking tracks circle or cross the hill. The walking tracks are popular with day walkers and they also see some cycle and equestrian traffic. The walks are generally rated as easy with some short steep climbs. The views from the summit are impressive: east to Red Hill and Isaacs Ridge, north to Scrivener Dam and Mt Painter and the Belconnen hills, northeast beyond the Captain Cook memorial water jet towards Mount Ainslie and Mount Majura, and west over Cooleman Ridge to the Brindabellas.

== History ==
For many years, the northern Canberra region, including Oakey Hill, was home to the Ngunnawal Aboriginal people. More recent European history includes references to Oakey Hill being included in Woden Valley farming leases which allowed stock to graze on the hill and adjacent lands.

With the development of nearby suburbs in the late 1960s/early 1970s, the grazing leases were terminated. A water reservoir was established near the top of the hill, power lines were erected on the lower slopes, and more recently a mobile telephone tower was erected near the reservoir.

Canberra Nature Park, including Oakey Hill, was gazetted in 1993.

In January 2003, bushfires swept in from the western side and about 80 percent of the hill was burned. While the fire damaged or destroyed many of the hill’s trees, it also stimulated growth, particularly of eucalypts and casuarinas, and parts of the lower slopes are now heavily timbered.

== Wildlife ==
The grasslands and timbered slopes provide habitat for a large number of small to medium-sized birds common to the Canberra region. Boobook owls, kookaburras and king quail are frequently sighted. The rocks and grass provide a home for lizards and snakes including brown snakes, bluetongue lizards, native gecko (eastern stone gecko or wood gecko - Diplodactylus vittatus) and the threatened pink tailed worm lizard (Aprasia parapulchella). Scorpions and huntsman spiders also hunt among the rocks and fallen bark in the treed areas. Oakey Hill has a resident population of eastern grey kangaroos and provides a corridor for fauna travelling through the Canberra Nature Reserve. Brush tailed possums are frequent visitors to residential gardens adjacent to the hill. The hill is also home to introduced species, including red foxes (Vulpes vulpes), hares and Indian Mynahs.

== Geology and geography ==
Oakey Hill is elongated in a north-northwest direction. This is parallel with the general direction of the nearby Murrumbidgee River. A low ridge extends southwards to Mt Taylor (856 metres above sea level) and this separates the Woden Valley from Weston Creek.

The rocks on Oakey Hill are remnants of volcano activity in the Middle Silurian period and are part of the Deakin Volcanics, the series of lava flows that cover much of the southern half of Canberra. Examples of the acid volcanic rocks of the Deakin Volcanics can be seen in the road cutting along the Tuggeranong Parkway between Hindmarsh Drive and Cotter Road. There are areas of porphyry which have intruded into the volcanic rocks and these also are Middle Silurian in age.

== Park care ==
While Oakey Hill has been a green reserve since the 1960s, it formally became part of the larger Canberra Nature Park with a gazettal in 1993.

Following the Canberra bushfires of 2003, the ACT Government began an ambitious fuel reduction program on the hill to remove the remaining stands of Tasmanian blue gum which is not endemic to the ACT. This galvanised local residents who, together with Environment ACT rangers, explored options for ongoing practical conservation work.

A parkcare group was formed and initially it worked according to a plan developed by the Parks, Conservation and Lands (PCL) Branch of the ACT Government, targeting areas of high conservation value. Over time, as the hill has recovered from the fires, the group itself has determined its work program in consultation with rangers.

The parkcare group’s principal focus is on helping the hill to heal itself by reducing the competition of introduced and exotic species, thereby allowing endemic species to flourish. Since the bushfires, many fire-adapted species such as casuarina (Allocasuarina verticillata) and the native black cypress pine (Callitris endlicheri) have recovered strongly. Native grasses – such as kangaroo grass, wallaby grass and lomandra - and a wide variety of shrubs have also made a comeback and are now competing with introduced species.

In the main, the parkcare group undertakes weed control, focussing on introduced species such as Cootamundra wattle, Tasmanian blue gum, firethorn, cotoneaster, briar rose and assorted woody weeds. Although the group has undertaken some planting of wildflowers, grasses and trees, drought conditions prevented any significant planting. The group also undertakes repair and maintenance of formal and informal walking tracks, weather and materials permitting.

Since it began in December 2003, the group has held monthly working bees on the third Sunday of each month (except January and February) to improve the site.
