= Tuggeranong Parkway =

Road in Canberra, Australia

Tuggeranong Parkway Australian Capital Territory
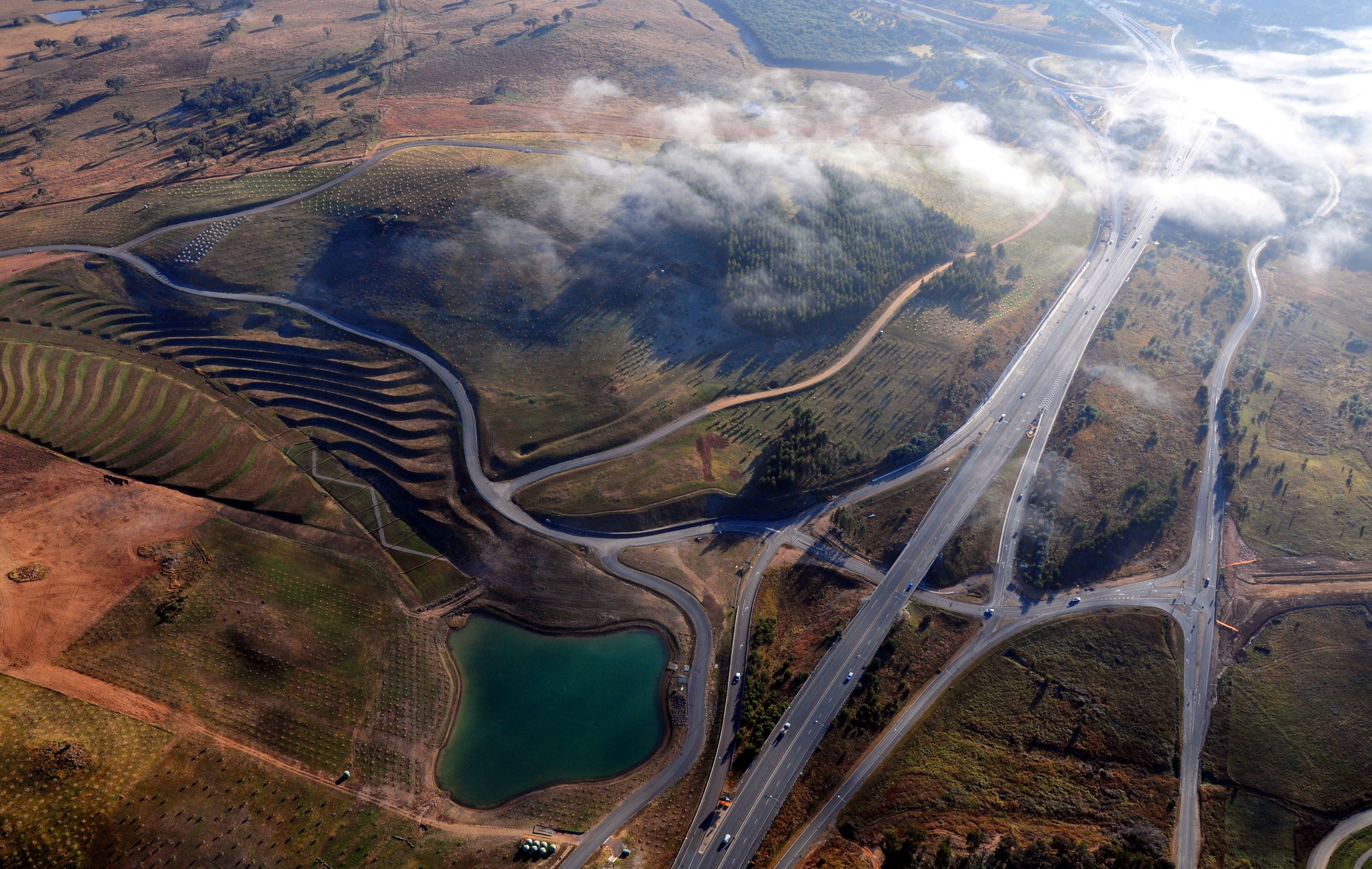
- Aerial view of Tuggeranong Parkway
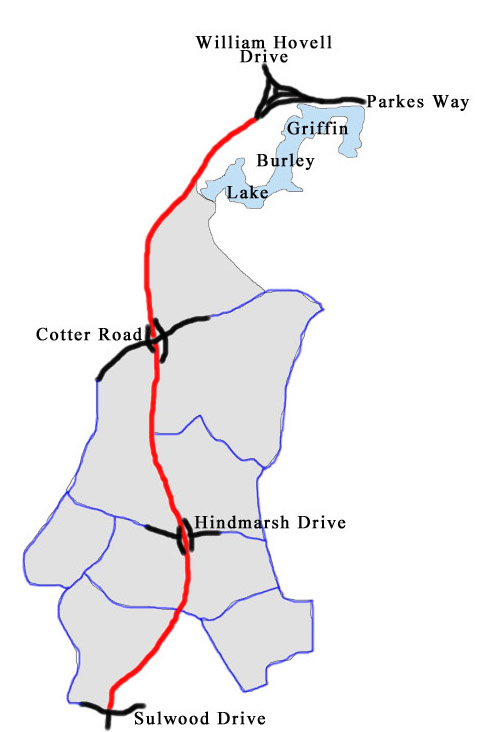

General information
- Type: Motorway
- Length: 11.3 km (7.0 mi)
- Gazetted: 13 April 1972

Major junctions
- NE end: Caswell Drive; Molonglo Valley, Australian Capital Territory
- Parkes Way; Cotter Road; Hindmarsh Drive; Sulwood Drive
- SW end: Drakeford Drive; Kambah, Australian Capital Territory

Highway system
- Highways in Australia; National Highway • Freeways in Australia; Road infrastructure in Canberra

Tuggeranong Parkway is an 11-kilometre-long (6.8 mi) major highway in Canberra, Australia. It links Civic to Tuggeranong, and is a bypass road to the Woden Valley-Weston Creek district. It also links to the Glenloch Interchange, where roads such as Caswell Drive connect to Belconnen.

== Route description ==
The Tuggeranong Parkway starts at Glenloch Interchange, continuing southwest from the roadway that forms Caswell Drive. After a short distance the parkway encounters its first interchange, which crosses over a spur of Lady Denman Drive. This spur provides access to the National Arboretum. The next few kilometres of roadway continue past the National Arboretum and through pine plantations while veering southwards, before crossing over the Molonglo River just to the north of the next interchange with Cotter Road. Following this interchange the parkway begins to climb Oakey Hill, crossing over Heysen Street during the ascent. After peaking on the hill, it begins to descend toward the Hindmarsh Drive interchange. The parkway then continues a slow descent toward its terminus at the Sulwood Drive intersection. The roadway itself continues southwards as Drakeford Drive.

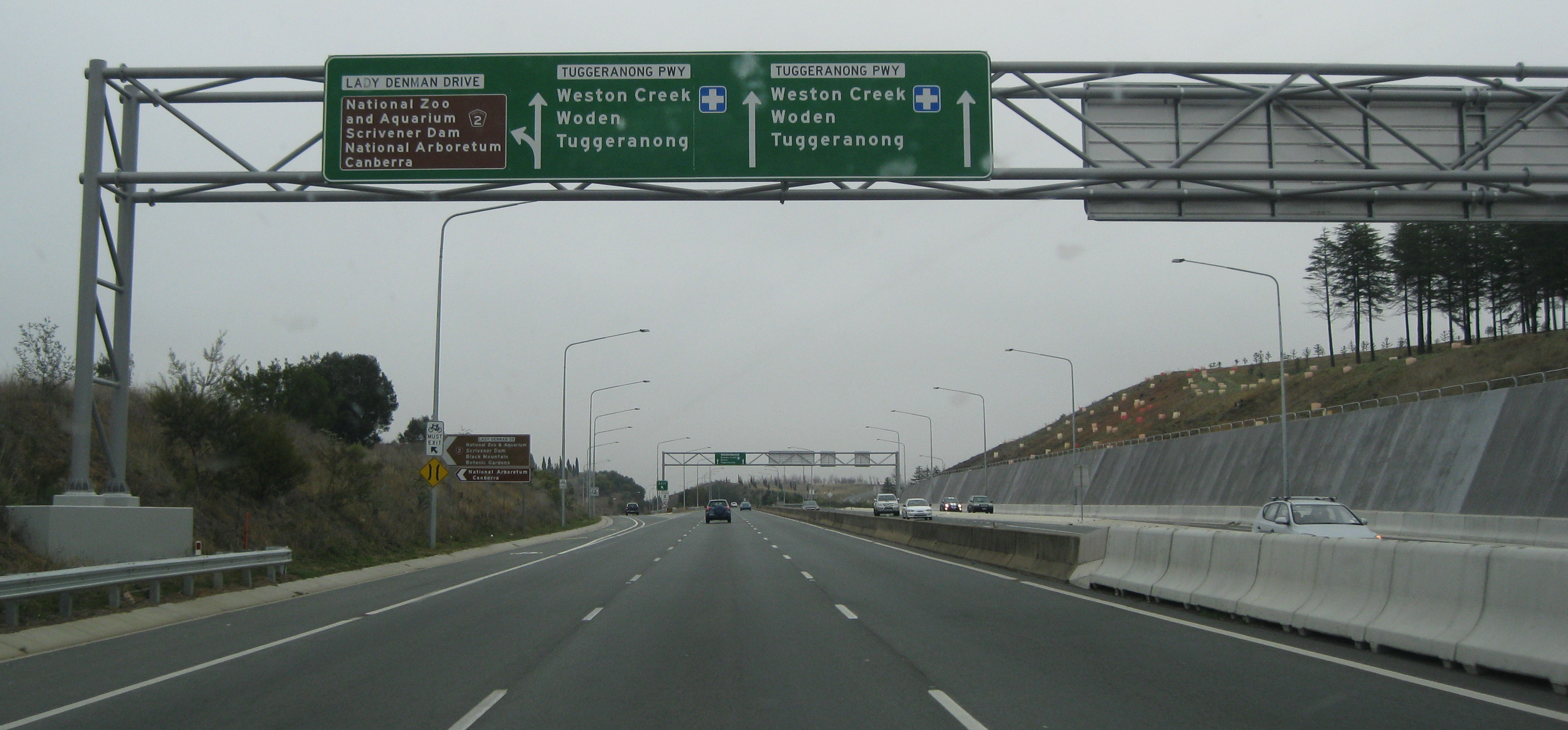
Southbound signage gantries on the Tuggeranong Parkway, just north of Lady Denman Drive interchange.

== History, planning and structure ==
The Tuggeranong Parkway is four lanes wide, has a speed limit of 100 kilometres per hour (62 mph) and is divided variously by a concrete wall or large median strip planted with trees. Four speed cameras were installed on the road in July 2007 to enforce the speed limit. They are at the Cotter Road and Hindmarsh Drive interchanges, monitoring both directions of traffic. During the Canberra bushfires of 2003, the flames crossed the road near Mount Taylor.

In parts, space has been set aside for duplication of the road (to eight lanes) if future needs require it. An example can be seen in the dual road cuttings behind the suburb of Weston.

The Tuggeranong Parkway also connects to the Gungahlin Drive Extension, which connects to Belconnen and Gungahlin in the north. In the south, it runs onto Drakeford Drive as it enters Kambah. Original plans for the Parkway had it continuing down the route of Kambah Pool Road and crossing the Murrumbidgee River over Red Rocks Gorge, to connect suburbs on the west side of the river. Due to the environmental sensitivity of the Murrumbidgee River corridor, especially the Red Rocks Gorge, this plan was cancelled, along with the planned suburbs on the western side of the river.

== Intersections and interchanges ==
District	Location	km	mi	Destinations	Notes
Belconnen / Molonglo Valley / Canberra Central		0.0	0.0	Caswell Drive - Belconnen (north) / Parkes Way – Civic (east) / William Hovell Drive - Gungahlin (west)	Glenloch Interchange; modified partial three-level turbine interchange, no eastbound to northbound ramp, no southbound to westbound ramp; Parkway north-eastern terminus: roadway continues north as Caswell Drive
Molonglo Valley		1.2	0.75	Lady Denman Drive – Acton	Diamond interchange
Molongo Valley / Weston Creek		4.1	2.5	Bridge over the Molonglo River	
Weston Creek / Woden Valley	Weston / Curtin	4.8	3.0	Cotter Road – Capital Hill, Coombs	Diamond interchange
Weston Creek / Woden Valley	Weston / Curtin / Lyons	6.3	3.9	Overpass over Heysen Street	
Weston Creek / Woden Valley	Weston / Lyons / Waramanga / Chifley	8.1	5.0	Hindmarsh Drive - Woden Valley, Fyshwick	Diamond interchange
Tuggeranong	Kambah	11.3	7.0	Drakeford Drive - Tuggeranong / Sulwood Drive - Wanniassa	Signal controlled crossroads; Parkway terminus: roadway continues south as Drakeford Drive
Incomplete access

== See also ==
- Freeways in Canberra
