= Belconnen Way =

Road in Canberra, Australia

Belconnen Way Australian Capital Territory
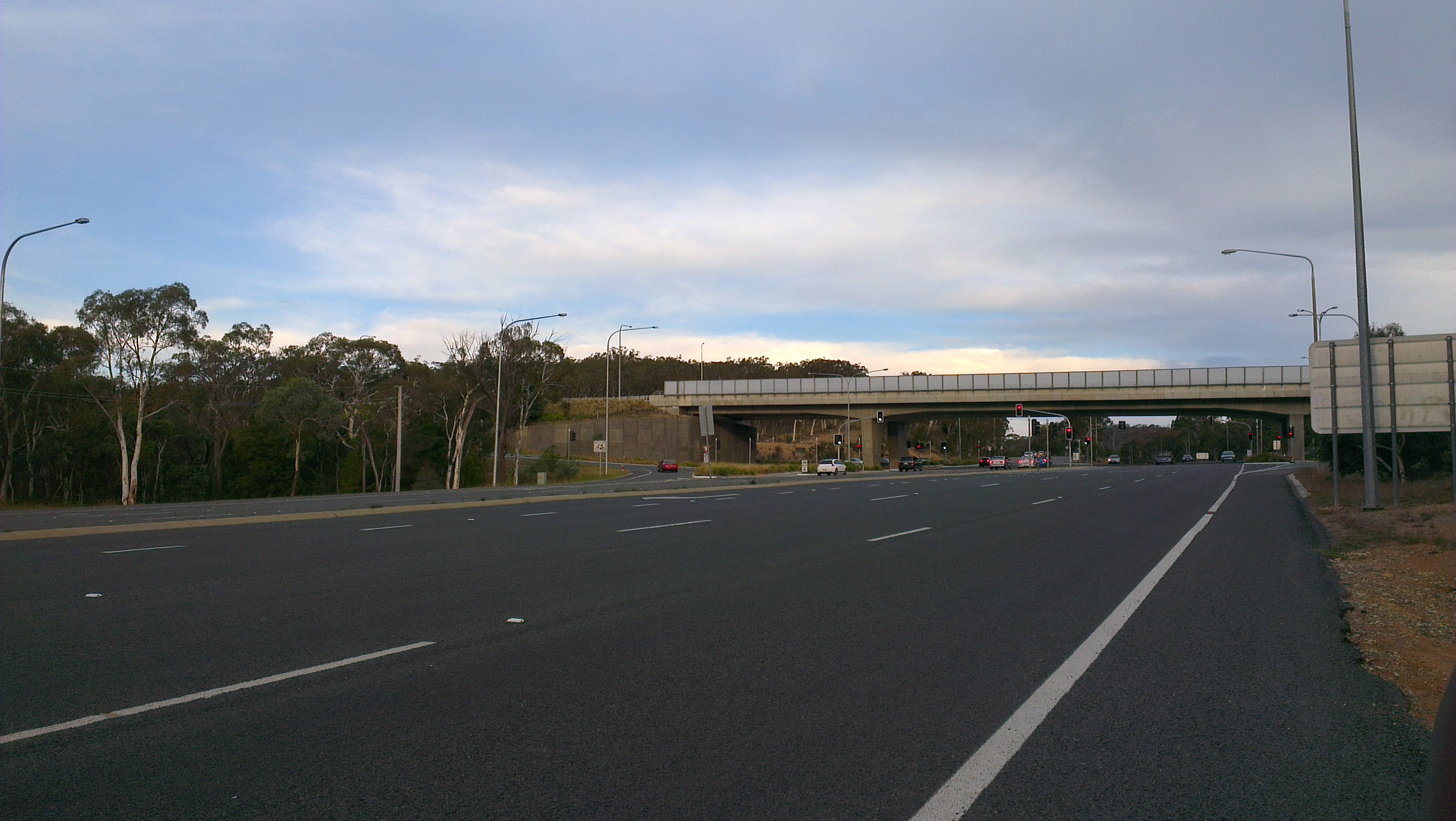
- Grade-separated intersection of Belconnen Way and Gungahlin/Caswell Drive, 2013

General information
- Type: Road
- Length: 7.9 km (4.9 mi)

Major junctions
- West end: Kingsford Smith Drive; Hawker, Australian Capital Territory
- Benjamin Way; Eastern Valley Way; Bindubi Street; Gungahlin Drive Extension; Fairfax Street
- East end: Barry Drive; O'Connor, Australian Capital Territory

Belconnen Way is a major road in Canberra, Australia. It connects William Hovell Drive and Kingsford Smith Drive in the west to Barry Drive and Fairfax Street, providing access to Civic and the Inner North via Belconnen Town Centre. In addition to being used as an alternate route to the city by commuters from the northern suburbs, it provides the primary connection to the Belconnen Town Center.

Along with Barry Drive, Belconnen Way was constructed in stages between 1965 and 1971 as a single carriageway road. It was progressively duplicated as the district's traffic and population grew. A connection to Gungahlin Drive forms the largest signalised and overpass intersection in Canberra, constructed during the Gungahlin Drive Extension works and opening in 2011.

The Belconnen Transitway, a proposal to upgrade the existing bus corridor between Belconnen and Canberra City, will partly run along Belconnen Way. The transitway is designed to improve access, reduce travel times and congestion, and increase productivity.
