= Australia Forum =

Proposed Australian infrastructure project

Coordinates: 35°17′13.14″S 149°7′33.11″E

The Australia Forum is a proposed convention centre complex for Canberra, Australia. The project was first put forward in 2011, and in 2017 its future became uncertain when the ACT Government withdrew funding for the preparation of a business case for it.

== History ==
In response to what its planners saw as the Australian capital's "lack of a sufficiently large, high quality, secure venue that can be locked down without disrupting the city, as well as a lack of sufficient accommodation of a suitably high standard" a proposal was announced on 11 April 2011 for a $328 million complex in what is now Acton park on the shore of the Western basin of Lake Burley Griffin. The complex would include a plenary hall catering for up to 3000, a purpose designed Centre for Dialogue, a ballroom, large exhibition space, restaurants, bars, five-star hotel and associated parking. The centre is expected to be able to securely host political dialogue meetings such as the G20 or CHOGM as well as trade conferences. Whilst the announcement of the plan was received with broad, though not unanimous, approval it was noted in the Canberra Times's supportive editorial that the community rarely embraces such ideas usually for reason of public expenditure or vague public benefit. It was also noted that the Government might also be liable for substantial environmental rehabilitation costs before construction could begin.

In March 2010 the Steering Committee for the "Australia Forum Scoping Study" was announced subsequent to several previously rejected proposals. The Australian Capital Territory government invested $500,000 in 2010 for the scoping study and in April 2011 agreed to allocate a further $1 million for technical studies.

In 2015, a design for the building was announced by Guida Moseley Brown Architects, to be designed by Massimiliano Fuksas.

== Committee ==
The committee consists of:

- Professor Peter Shergold, former head of the Department of Prime Minister and Cabinet (chair)
- Dr Dawn Casey, Director, Powerhouse Museum and formerly Director, National Museum of Australia
- Professor Ian Chubb, AC, Vice Chancellor, Australian National University
- General Peter Cosgrove, AC, MC Chair of the Australian War Memorial Council
- Ms Virginia Haussegger, ABC News presenter
- Mr Rupert Myer, AM, Chairman of the National Gallery of Australia

== See also ==
- National Convention Centre Canberra
