= Parkes Way =

Road in Canberra, Australia

Parkes Way Australian Capital Territory
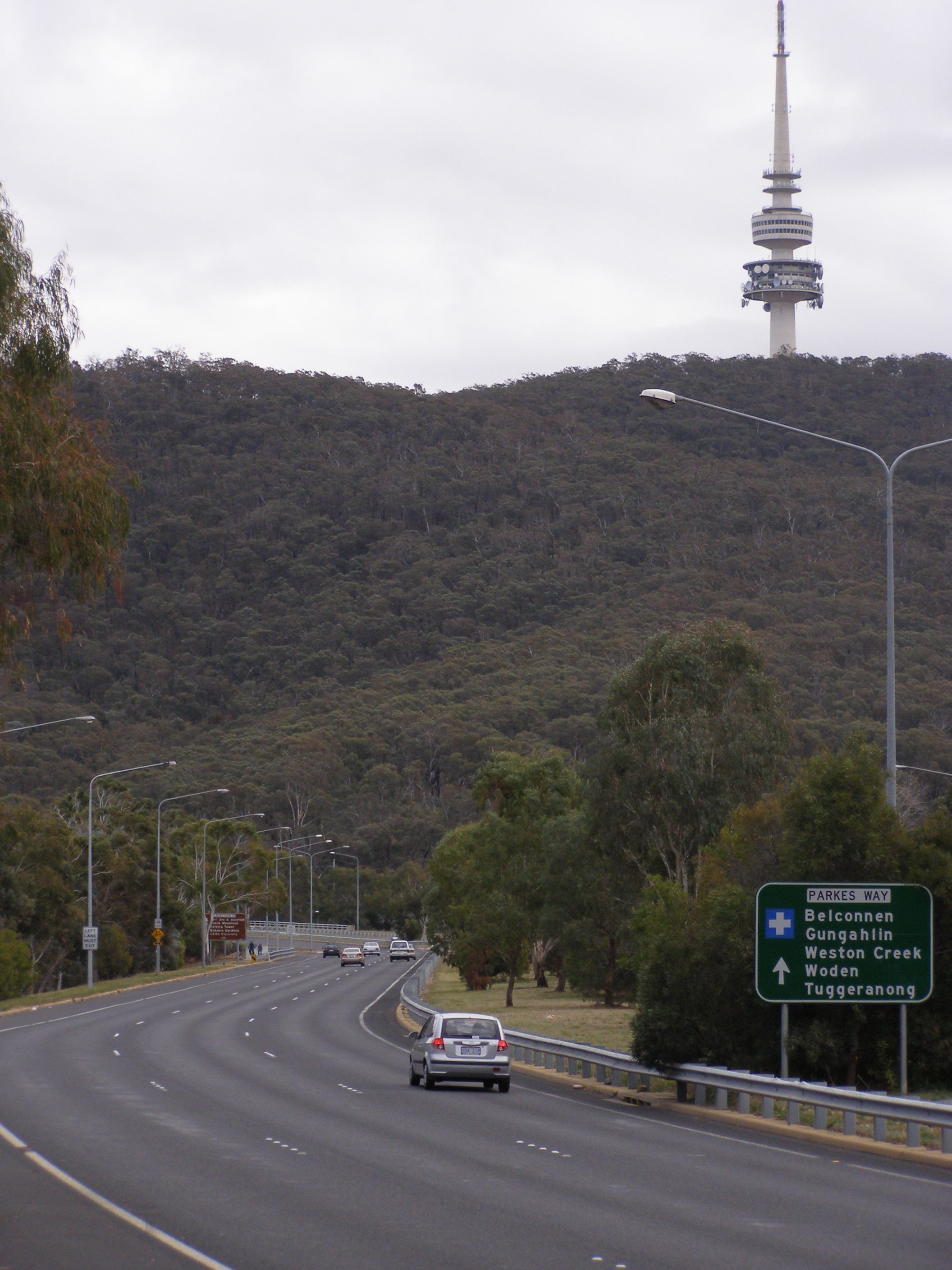
- Parkes Way heading towards Black Mountain

General information
- Type: Highway
- Opened: 29 November 1961
- Gazetted: 21 July 1960
- Maintained by: Transport Canberra & City Services
- History: Further stages of Parkes Way were built progressively and completed on the following dates: 2nd stage – 5 April 1963; Final Stage – 17 October 1979

Major junctions
- East end: Kings Avenue; Morshead Drive; Barton / Russell / Parkes, Canberra
- Coranderrk Street; Commonwealth Avenue (A23); Edinburgh Avenue
- West end: Tuggeranong Parkway; Caswell Drive (GDE); William Hovell Drive; Molonglo / Belconnen / Canberra Central district border, Canberra

Highway system
- Highways in Australia; National Highway • Freeways in Australia; Road infrastructure in Canberra

Parkes Way is a major road in Canberra, Australia, which runs east-west between Kings Avenue and the Glenloch Interchange. At Glenloch Interchange it intersects with William Hovell Drive, Tuggeranong Parkway, and Caswell Drive (Gungahlin Drive Extension). The road is freeway standard from the Coranderrk Street roundabout to Glenloch Interchange. Parkes Way is named for prominent Australian federalist, Sir Henry Parkes.

It passes by the edge of Black Mountain and part of the Australian National University via the Acton Tunnel. It also passes just south of the City and north of Commonwealth Park and Kings Park on the shore of Lake Burley Griffin.

Parkes Way was created with an 80 km/h speed limit that remained in place until 2008 when it was changed to 90 km/h.

== Future ==
Draft plans of the "City to Lake" Plan by the ACT government would see Parkes Way be split into 2 levels from the Edinburgh Avenue exit to the Anzac Parade exit. The top level would be a boulevard with street level access to new buildings in the area and intersections to other roads. The bottom level would be a freeway standard tunnel.

== Interchanges and intersections ==
District	Location	km	mi	Destinations	Notes
Canberra Central	Barton–Russell–Parkes tripoint	0	0.0	Kings Avenue / Morshead Drive – Russell, Parkes	Eastern terminus at interchange
Canberra Central	Parkes	1.2	0.75	Anzac Parade – Australian War Memorial, Reid, Campbell	Roundabout, with one bypass lane westbound
Canberra Central	Parkes–City boundary	1.9	1.2	Coranderrk Street – Civic, Reid	Roundabout, with bypass lanes westbound
Canberra Central	Parkes–City–Acton tripoint	2.5	1.6	Commonwealth Avenue (A23) – Parkes	Half-cloverleaf interchange, no access to Commonwealth Avenue northbound or from Commonwealth Avenue southbound
Canberra Central	Acton–City boundary	3	1.9	Edinburgh Avenue north / Lawson Crescent south – Civic, Australian National University	Interchange
Canberra Central	Acton	4.4	2.7	Clunies Ross Street north / Lady Denman Drive south	Westbound exit and eastbound entrance
Canberra Central – Molonglo Valley – Belconnen tripoint		6.6	4.1	Tuggeranong Parkway south / William Hovell Drive west / Caswell Drive north – Woden, Tuggeranong, Belconnen, Gungahlin	Western terminus at Glenloch Interchange
Incomplete access
