= Barton Highway =

Highway in New South Wales and the Australian Capital Territory

Barton Highway New South Wales–Australian Capital Territory
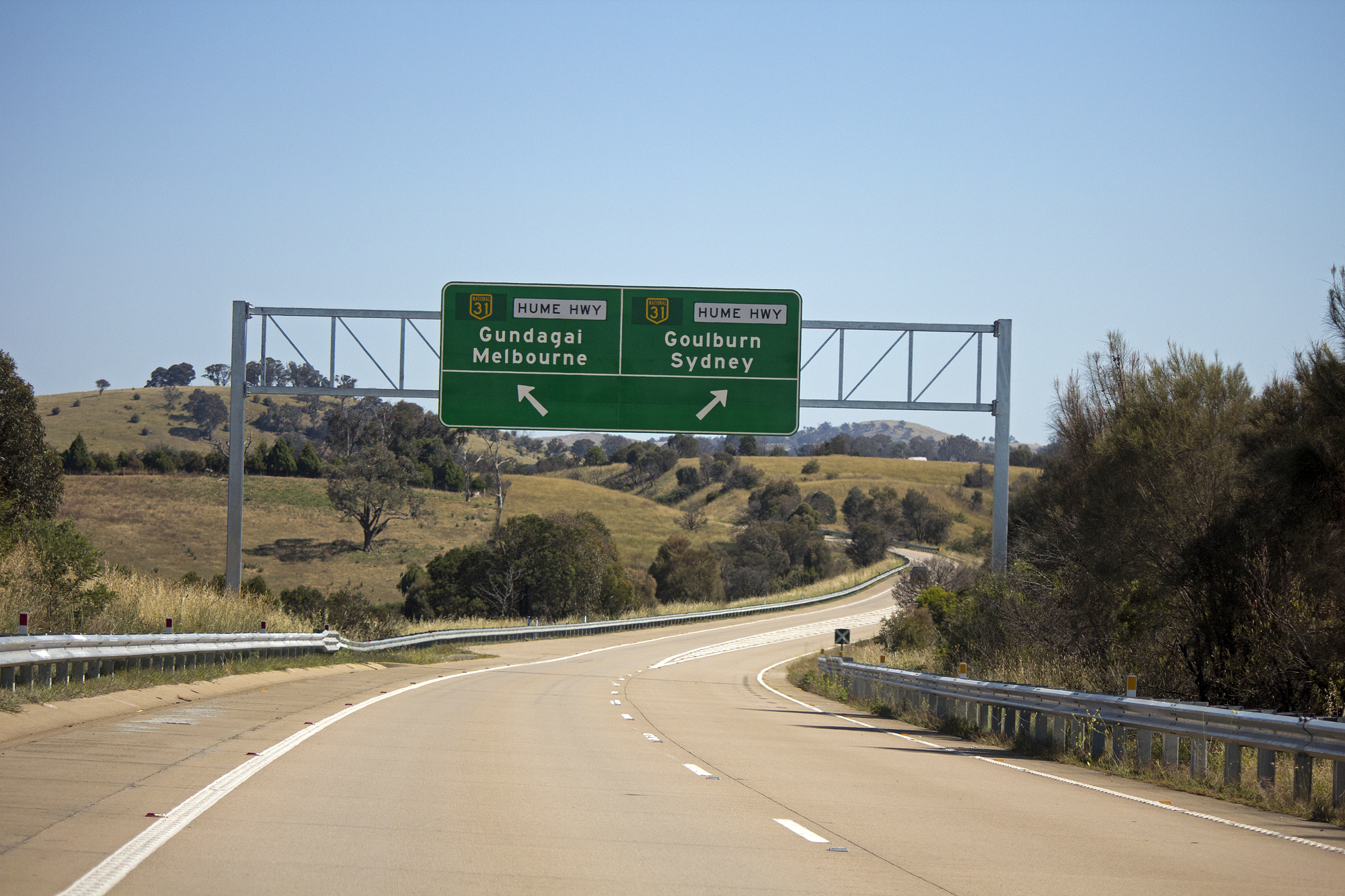
- Exit to Hume Highway from Barton Highway
- Coordinates: 34.828282°S 148.957221°E (North end); 35.240576°S 149.136974°E (South end)

General information
- Type: Highway
- Length: 52 km (32 mi)
- Gazetted: August 1928 (as Main Road 56); February 1935 (as State Highway 15)
- Route number(s): A25 (2013–present) (within NSW); A25 (2013–present) (within ACT)
- Former route number: National Highway 25 (1974–2013, within NSW); National Highway 25 (1974–2013, within ACT); National Route 25 (1956–1974); ACT Tourist Route 4 (Nicholls–Lyneham)

Major junctions
- North end: Hume Highway; Yass, New South Wales
- Yass Valley Way; Gungahlin Drive
- South end: Federal Highway; Northbourne Avenue; Lyneham, Australian Capital Territory

Location(s)
- Major settlements: Murrumbateman, Hall

Highway system
- Highways in Australia; National Highway • Freeways in Australia; Highways in New South Wales; Road infrastructure in Canberra

Barton Highway is a highway in New South Wales and the Australian Capital Territory. It connects Canberra to Hume Highway at Yass, and it is part of the route from Melbourne to Canberra. It is named in honour of Sir Edmund Barton, the first Prime Minister of Australia.

== Route ==
Barton Highway commences at the interchange with Hume Highway northeast of Yass and heads in a southerly direction as a four-lane, dual-carriageway freeway, before narrowing to a two-lane, single-carriageway highway south of the interchange with Yass Valley Way where it meets its old alignment, and continues south through undulating hills to the village of Murrumbateman, before crossing the border into the Australian Capital Territory (ACT) just outside the village of Hall, before eventually terminating at the intersection with Federal Highway and Northbourne Avenue at Lyneham.

The Gundaroo Drive/Barton Highway round-about is surrounded by a number of trees to the south of the intersection. The pine tree plantation was originally planted in the shape of a map of Australia.

== History ==
The passing of the Main Roads Act of 1924 through the Parliament of New South Wales provided for the declaration of Main Roads, roads partially funded by the State government through the Main Roads Board (MRB, later Transport for NSW). Main Road No. 56 was declared along this road on 8 August 1928, from Yass via Murrumbateman to Lyneham (and continuing northwards via Cowra to Forbes, Parkes, Dubbo, Gilgandra and Coonamble eventually to Walgett, and southwards via Canberra eventually to the intersection with Queanbeyan-Braidwood Road, today Kings Highway, at Queanbeyan); with the passing of the Main Roads (Amendment) Act of 1929 to provide for additional declarations of State Highways and Trunk Roads, this was amended to Trunk Road 56 on 8 April 1929. The original purpose of the Yass-Canberra Road was to connect surrounding towns to farming locations in the Yass Valley, and later with the newly-established national capital.

The Department of Main Roads, which had succeeded the MRB in 1932, declared State Highway 15 on 19 February 1935, from the intersection with Hume Highway near Yass via Murrumbateman to the border of the Federal Capital Territory (today Australian Capital Territory) at Hall, subsuming the existing portion Trunk Road 56 from Yass to Hall; the southern end of Trunk Road 56 was truncated to meet Hume Highway west of Yass, as a result. State Highway 15 was officially named as Barton Highway on 28 July 1954, and fully sealed by 1960.

The first realignment occurred during the late 1970s, when the southern terminus of the highway was relocated north, to the north of the Yowani Country Club. In 1980 the village of Hall was bypassed; and during the early 1990s a dual carriageway was completed on the ACT section of the highway, between Hall and Kaleen. A further section of dual carriageways was completed in December 2002, between Gungahlin Drive and the southern terminus with the Federal Highway.

Between April 1993 and May 1995, as part of the Hume Highway bypass of Yass, a 9-kilometre (5.6 mi) dual carriageway deviation of Barton Highway was constructed to connect Barton Highway with the new alignment of Hume Highway, north of Yass. The new route crosses the Yass River on twin bridges to the east of Cooma Cottage before terminating at a trumpet interchange with Hume Highway, about 3 kilometres (1.9 mi) northeast of Yass. The highway's former alignment, near the historic Cooma Cottage, east of the Yass River, was renamed Kirkton Road and Dog Trap Road.

The passing of the Roads Act of 1993 through the Parliament of New South Wales updated road classifications and the way they could be declared within New South Wales. Under this act, Barton Highway today retains its declaration as Highway 15, from the intersection with Hume Highway near Yass to the border of the Australian Capital Territory at Hall.

Barton Highway was signed National Route 25 across its entire length in 1956. The Whitlam government introduced the federal National Roads Act 1974, where roads declared as a National Highway were still the responsibility of the states for road construction and maintenance, but were fully compensated by the Federal government for money spent on approved projects. As an important interstate link between the capitals of the Australian Capital Territory and Victoria, Barton Highway was declared a National Highway in 1974, and was consequently re-allocated National Highway 25. With both states' conversion to the newer alphanumeric system in 2013, its route number was updated to route A25.

=== Murrumbateman bypass and staged duplication ===
The Barton Highway passes through farmlands and the NSW town of Murrumbateman. In October 2001 the Australian Government announced that they would bypass the town to the east. A$20 million was set aside in the 2006 federal budget for planning and duplication costs associated with the bypass. The same year, the NRMA had named the Barton Highway as the worst highway on the AusLink National Network in New South Wales; accounting for three road fatalities annually. While 42 kilometres (26 mi) of the 52-kilometre (32 mi) highway are located in New South Wales (NSW), only 6 kilometres (3.7 mi) of the NSW section are dual carriageway.

Various NSW and Federal governments have committed funding towards improvements to the Barton Highway, including a bypass east of Murrumbateman and a staged duplication to create 33 kilometres (21 mi) of dual carriageways. Stage one of construction work has commenced and is scheduled to be completed by 2023.

== Major intersections ==
State	LGA / District	Location	km	mi	Destinations	Notes
New South Wales	Yass Valley	Yass	0	0.0	Hume Highway (M31) – Gundagai, Melbourne, Goulburn, Sydney	Northern terminus of highway and route A25 at trumpet interchange
New South Wales	Yass Valley	Manton	4.6	2.9	Yass Valley Way – Yass	Dumbbell interchange
New South Wales	Yass Valley	Murrumbateman	18.3	11.4	Murrumbateman Road – Gundaroo, Bungendore	
New South Wales	Yass Valley	Wallaroo	35.8	22.2	Nanima Road – Nanima	
State border			40.1	24.9	New South Wales – Australian Capital Territory state border	
Australian Capital Territory	Hall	Hall	40.2	25.0	Victoria Street – Hall	Former Barton Highway alignment
Australian Capital Territory	Hall	Hall	41.8	26.0	Wallaroo Road – Wallaroo	
Australian Capital Territory	Hall	Hall	41.9	26.0	Gladstone Street – Hall	
Australian Capital Territory	Hall	Hall	43.1	26.8	Victoria Street – Hall	Former Barton Highway alignment
Australian Capital Territory	Gungahlin	Kinlyside–Nicholls boundary	43.4	27.0	Kuringa Drive (southwest) – Fraser, Belconnen; Clarrie Hermes Drive (northeast) – Ngunnawal	
Australian Capital Territory	Gungahlin–Belconnen boundary	Nicholls–Crace–Giralang tripoint	46.1	28.6	William Slim Drive (southwest) – Belconnen; Gundaroo Drive (northeast) – Gungahlin, Gundaroo	Roundabout
Australian Capital Territory	Gungahlin–Belconnen boundary	Crace–Mitchell–Kaleen tripoint	49.8	30.9	Gungahlin Drive – Mitchell, Belconnen, Woden	Parclo interchange
Australian Capital Territory	Gungahlin–Belconnen boundary	Mitchell–Kaleen–Lyneham tripoint	50.6	31.4	Ellenborough Street – Kaleen, Lyneham	
Australian Capital Territory	Gungahlin–Belconnen boundary	Lyneham	51.4	31.9	Randwick Road – Lyneham	
Australian Capital Territory	North Canberra	Lyneham–Downer border	52.0	32.3	Federal Highway (A23 northeast) – Goulburn; Northbourne Avenue (A23 south) – Civic, Capital Hill, Queanbeyan	Southern terminus of highway and route A25
1.000 mi = 1.609 km; 1.000 km = 0.621 mi: Route transition

== See also ==
- Highways in Australia
- List of highways in New South Wales
