= Ginninderra Drive =

Road in Canberra, Australia

Ginninderra Drive Australian Capital Territory
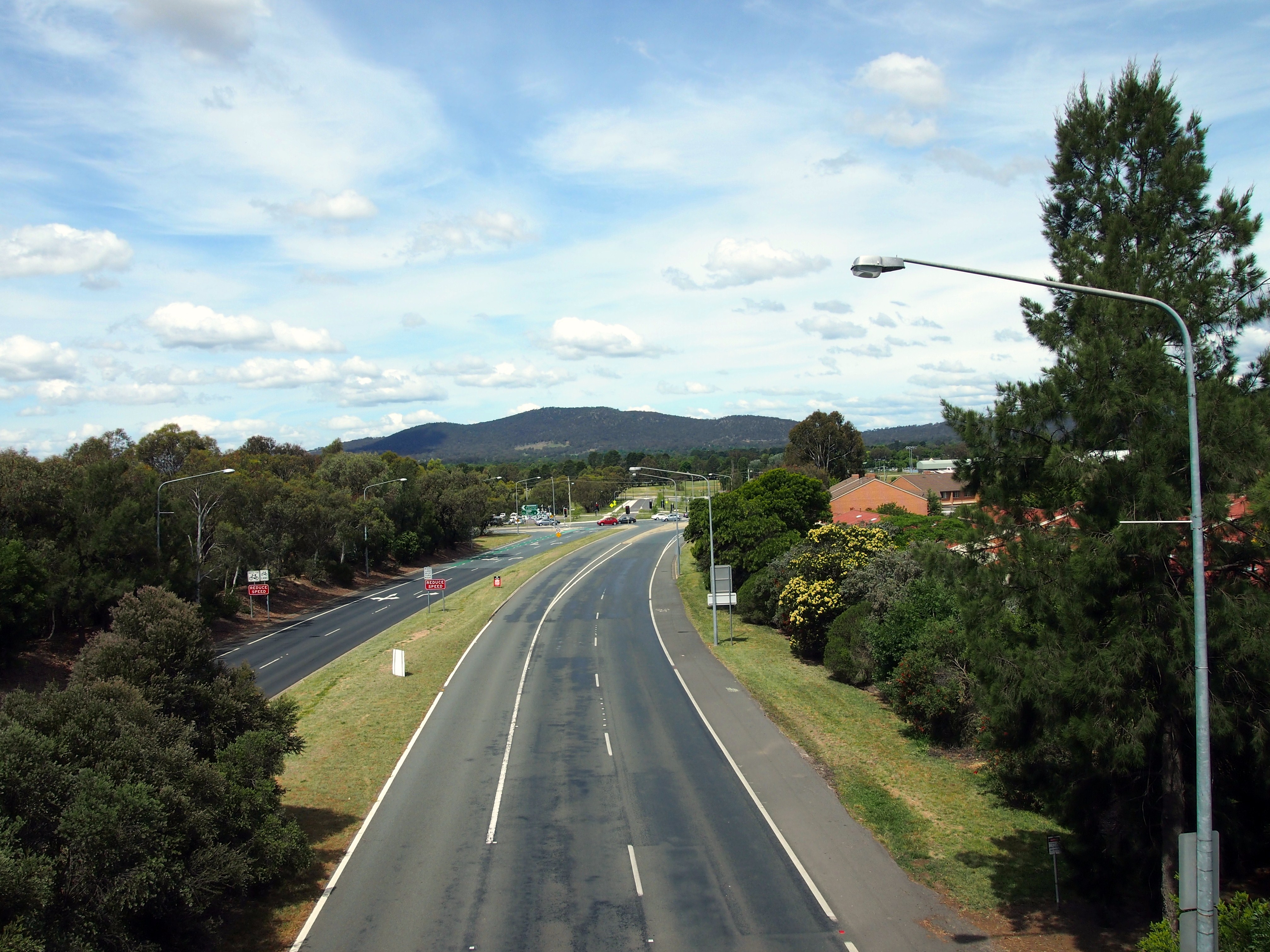
- The eastern end of Ginninderra Drive viewed from a footbridge

General information
- Type: Road
- Length: 12 km (7.5 mi)
- Opened: 1976
- Former route number: ACT Tourist Drive 4 (Lyneham–Bruce)

Major junctions
- East end: Mouat Street; Ellenborough Street; Lyneham, Australian Capital Territory
- Gungahlin Drive Extension; Haydon Drive; Gundaroo Drive; Coulter Drive
- West end: Kerrigan Street; Dunlop, Australian Capital Territory

Ginninderra Drive is a major arterial road in the northern suburbs of Canberra, the capital city of Australia. The road provides an important access corridor to facilities including the Australian Institute of Sport, Canberra Stadium, the University of Canberra and Belconnen Town Centre. It is built to a dual carriageway standard carrying two or three traffic lanes in each direction for most of its length, with a speed limit of 80 km/h (50 mph). In Charnwood, the road is single carriageway with a speed limit of 70 km/h (43mph). In Dunlop, it is still single carriageway, but with a speed limit of 60 km/h (37 mph). The first section of the road, connecting Lyneham with the new suburb of Evatt opened to traffic in October 1976.

== Route ==
The road follows a generally westward alignment from an intersection with Mouat Street in the suburb of Lyneham. A grade separated interchange is provided at Gungahlin Drive. The road passes over Lake Ginninderra north of Belconnen Town Centre and continues towards Kingsford Smith Drive in the West Belconnen area. Beyond Tillyard Drive in the suburb of Charnwood, the road becomes single carriageway until its terminus in Dunlop. Original plans for the road included a direct connection from Mouat Street to Northbourne Avenue via a corridor between Southwell Park and the Yowani Golf Course however there are no plans to construct this section, evidenced by the removal of the corridor from the planning scheme in 1998.

Ginninderra Drive crosses the eastern reach of Lake Ginninderra over dual 185 m (607 ft) curved spans. Both bridges were significantly upgraded in 2009. Further to the west the road embankment crossing Ginninderra Creek, constructed in 1974 forms the dam wall.
