= Australian National University Library =

Academic library in Canberra, Australia

Coordinates: 35.278°S 149.12°E

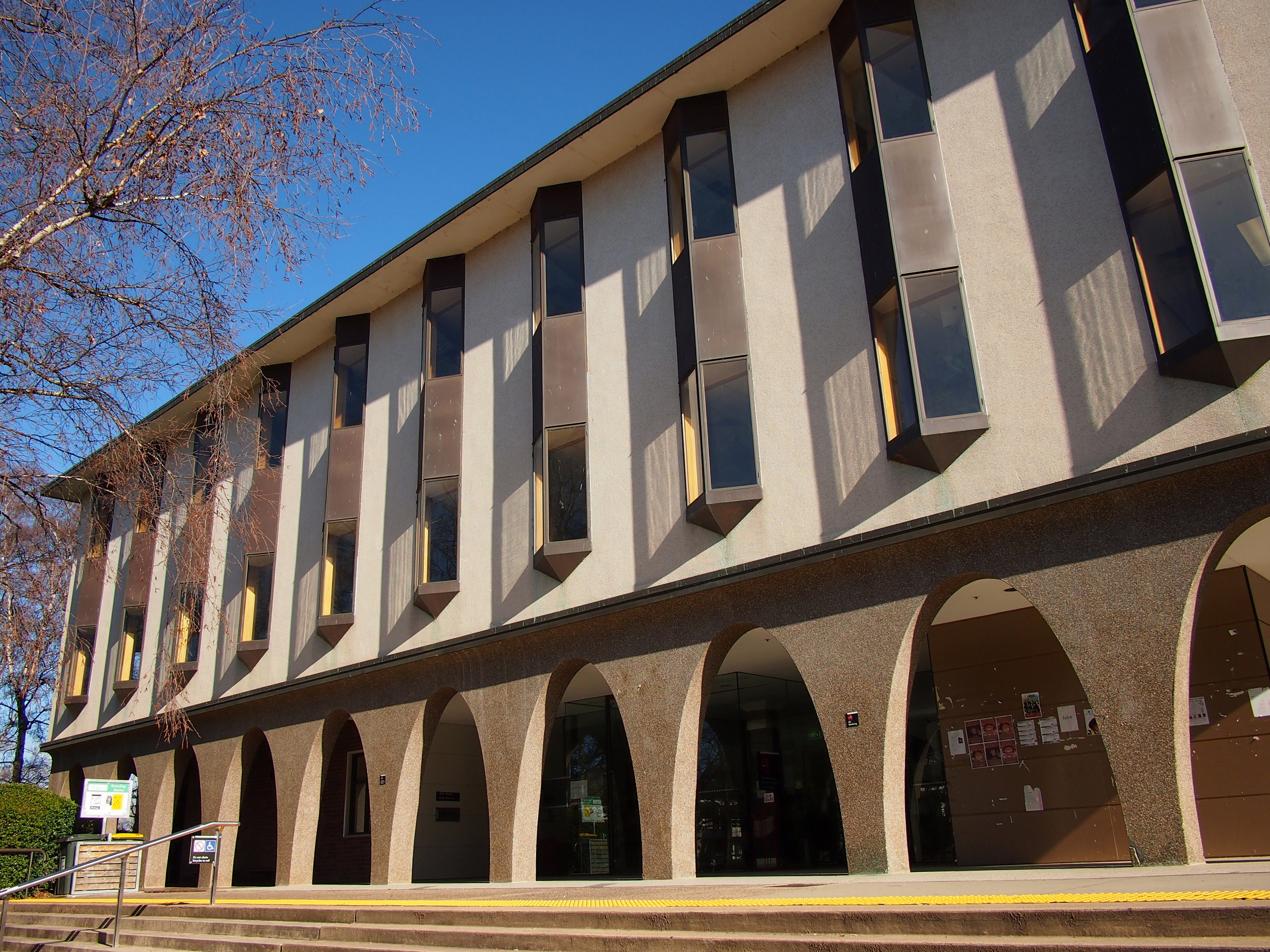
- J. B. Chifley Building
- Location: Canberra, Australia
- Established: 1948

Other information
- Website: http://anulib.anu.edu.au

The Australian National University Library is part of the Australian National University in Canberra, one of the world's major research universities.

== History ==
The Australian National University (ANU) Library has its foundations in the appointment of the first University Librarian, Arthur Leopold Gladstone McDonald (1898–1981) in early 1948 . The importance of the establishment of the ANU Library in the development of the university was such that McDonald was appointed by the Interim Council before any of the professors .

Initially McDonald and several assistants were housed in Ormond College at the University of Melbourne , where they began to form the collection. At the end of 1950 the collection, which had grown to approximately 40,000 volumes, was transferred to Canberra, to be located in the Canberra Community Hospital and nearby huts . Over the course of the 1950s the collection grew steadily, and by the time of McDonald's retirement in 1960 the collection had grown to 150,000 volumes (excluding pamphlets) .

== University librarians ==
- 1948–1960: Arthur Leopold Gladstone McDonald (1898–1981)
- 1960–1972: J. J. Graneek
- 1974–1980: M.G. Simms
- 1980–2002: Colin Steele
- 2003–2011: V.G. Elliott
- 2012–2025: Roxanne Missingham

== Library branches ==
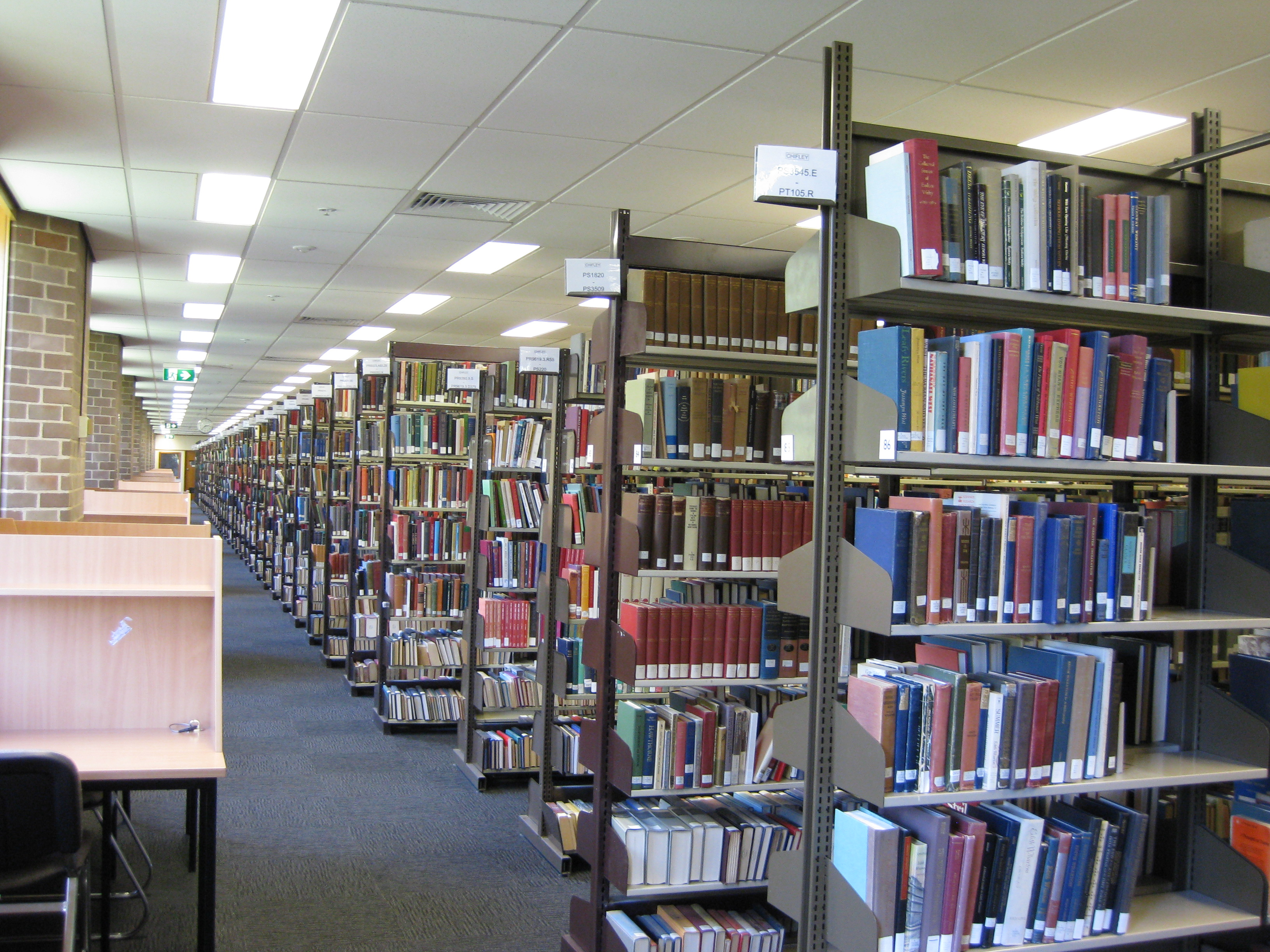
Bookshelves on the top floor of the Chifley Library

The ANU Library collection is housed in five specialised library branches.

=== Art and Music Library ===
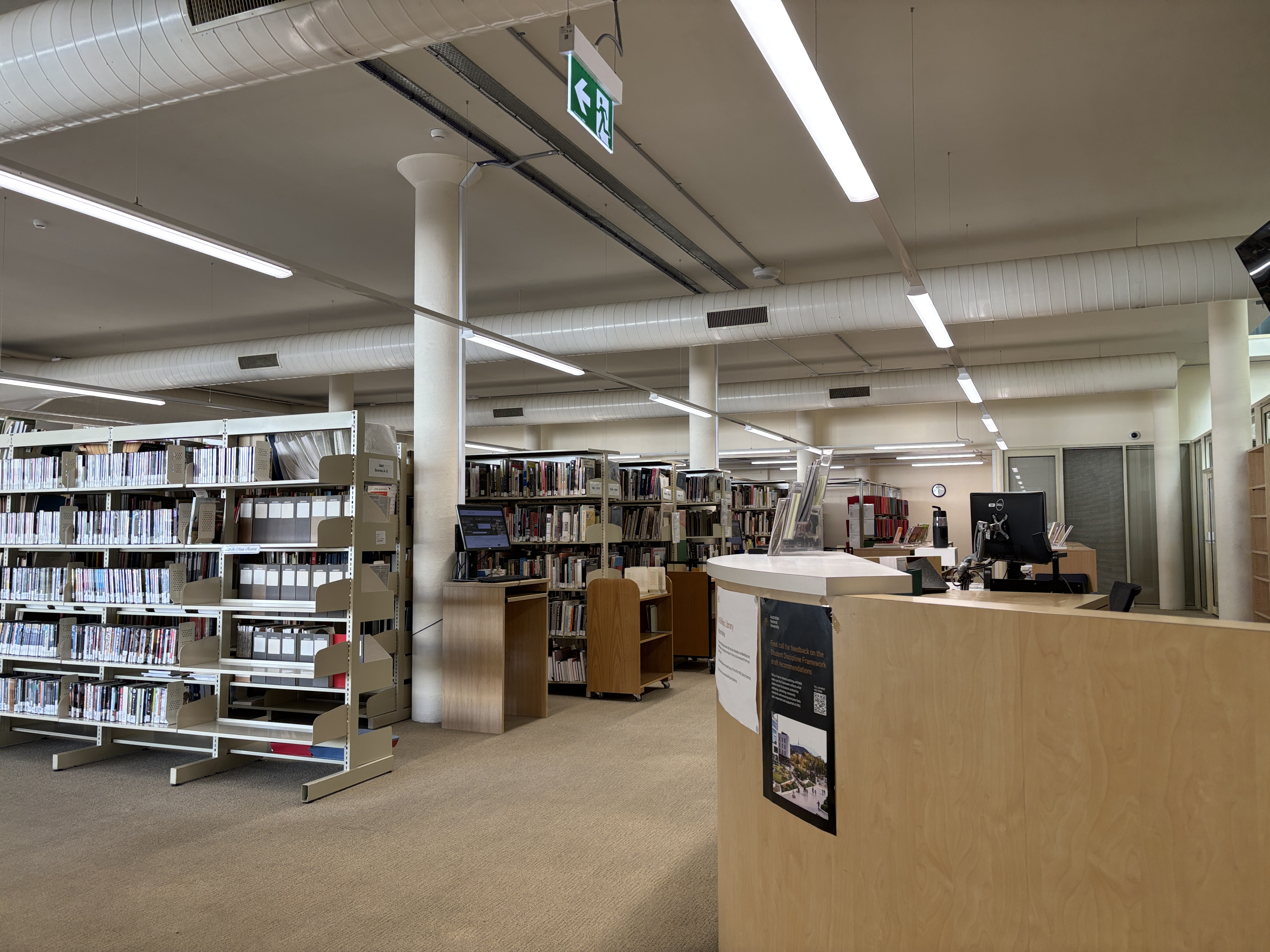
Part of the interior of the Art and Music Library in 2026

The Art and Music Library services both the School of Art and School of Music. It is the principal fine arts library at the ANU, and holds material on visual arts in many formats including books, exhibition catalogues, videos, CD Roms, DVDs, slides (more than 70,000 35mm slides), journals and magazines. The ANU's music collections are also held in this library; material is held in many formats, including performance scores, CDs, LPs, books, collected works, journals and electronic databases.

The library also provides free membership to Visual Arts Access & Open School of Music students.

ACT schools and incorporated musical groups may borrow orchestral and choral sets for a fee.

The library was located in the School of Art until December 2023, when it was relocated to the Chifley Library building while hail damage to the School of Art was repaired. At this time it was intended to retain the Art and Music Library in the Chifley Library with its former premises becoming a study space. This decision was protested by students. In early 2024 the university decided to return most of the collection to the School of Art building once repairs were complete, with frequently used works remaining in the Chifley Library. In April 2025 it was announced that the full collection would be returned to the Art and Music Library after it re-opened on 14 April.

=== Chifley Library ===
The Chifley Library (named after Prime Minister Ben Chifley) contains the main ANU social sciences and humanities collections relating to Australia, Europe and the Americas, as well as the Reserve Area for the social sciences and humanities. Principal subject areas covered include economics, education, fine art, history, languages, linguistics, literature, philosophy, political science, religion, sociology, women's studies and official documents.

On 25 February 2018 all of the books and other items, including precious and rare works, on the lower level were destroyed or damaged by flooding. The flooding also knocked out the building's electrical, air conditioning and IT systems. Over 100,000 books were destroyed by the flooding, representing up to 10 percent of the ANU's total holdings.

=== Hancock Library ===
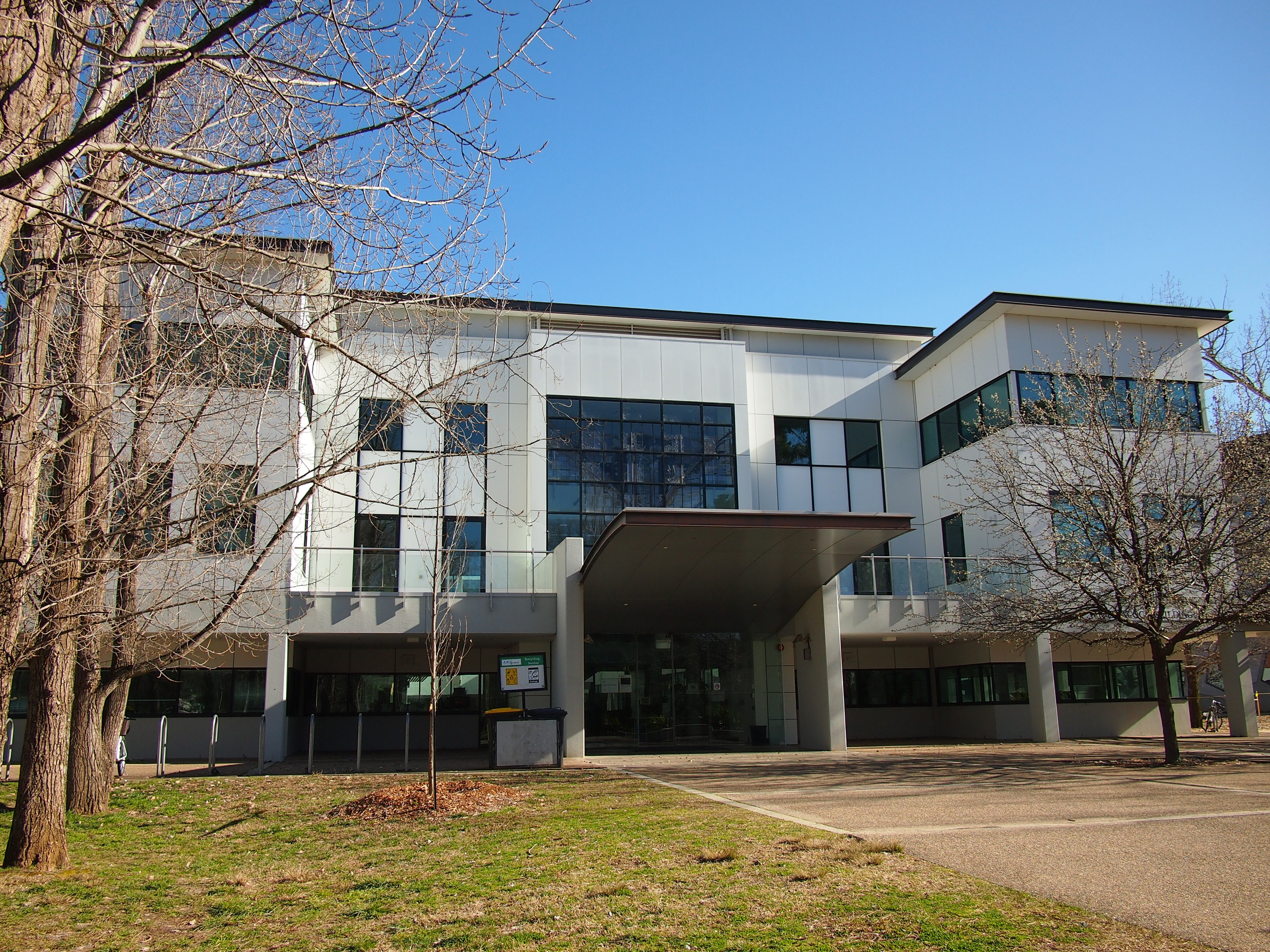
The entrance to the W. K. Hancock Building

The Hancock Library (named after historian William Keith Hancock) houses the principal ANU science collections, in over 900 current serials and over 200,000 monographs. The main subject areas covered include general science, history and philosophy of science, science policy; the mathematical and computing sciences; psychology; biological sciences; environmental science; forestry; geography; geology; and engineering and technology.

=== Law Library ===
The Law Library, located in the ANU College of Law provides a wide range of legal resources for staff and students. The law collection houses statutes and case law from every Australian jurisdiction and several commonwealth countries. Special emphasis has been given to public and international law in the collection.

=== Menzies Library ===
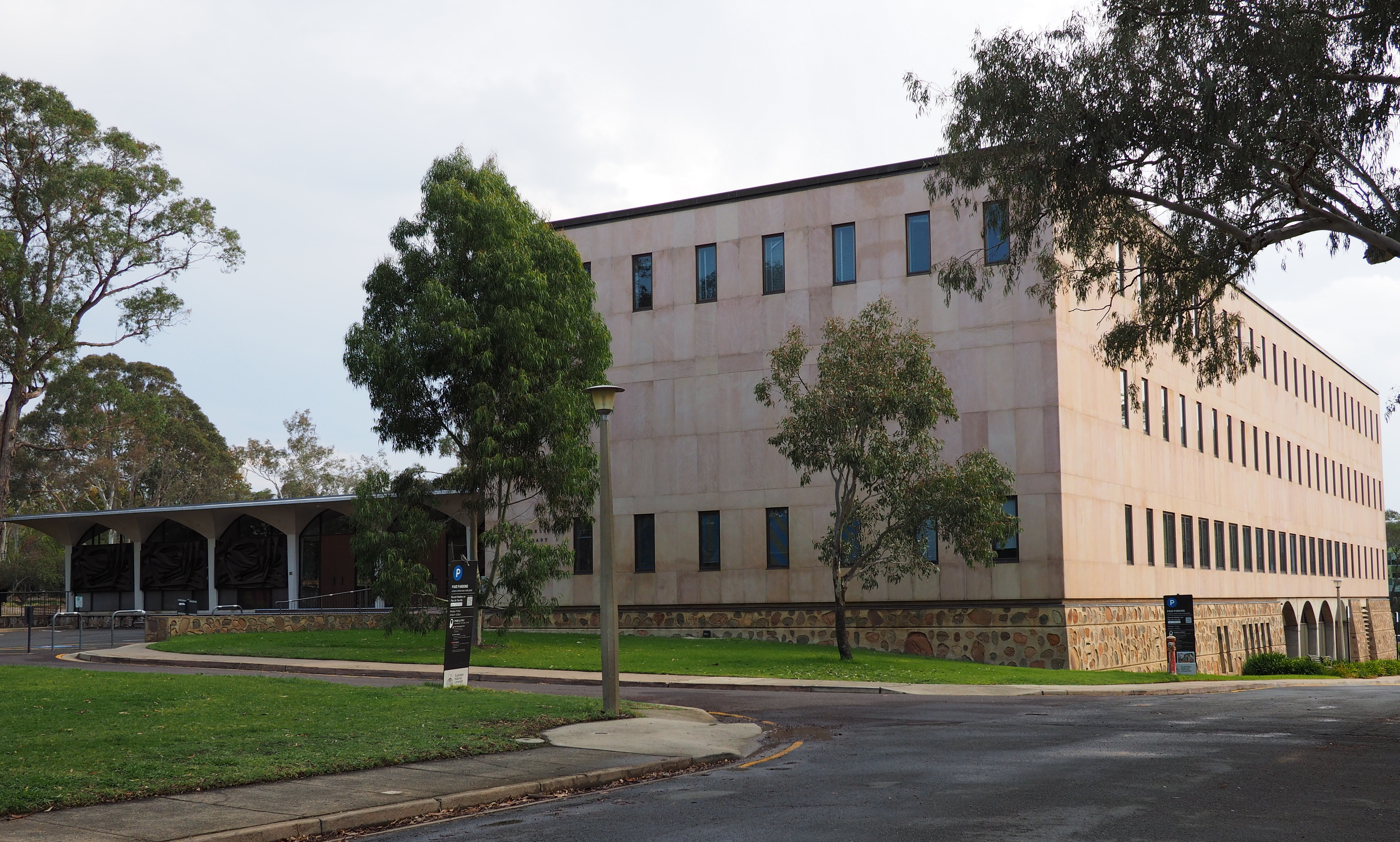
R. G. Menzies Building

The collections in the Menzies Library (named after Prime Minister Robert Menzies) support Asia Pacific studies in the fields of history, anthropology, politics and international relations, literature and language, religion and philosophy. The library's holdings of Asian scholarly materials are considered to be the most comprehensive among Australian university libraries and are well compared internationally. In addition, the Menzies Library together with the ANU Archives constitute a major resource centre for Pacific studies.

=== Rare books / special collections ===
ANU rare books and special collections are housed in a closed access collection held in the Rare Book Room in the R. G. Menzies Building. Notable special collections include:

- Petr Herel collection of Artists' Books and Limited Editions Portfolios: contains works created in the Graphic Investigation Workshop (1978–1998) at the Canberra School of Art;
- Mortlake Collection: ten thousand volumes of nineteenth-century English literature, particularly strong in yellow-backs, 'sensation novels' published by Minerva Press, Gothic novels, and children's literature;
- La Nauze Collection: over 500 volumes on political economy, containing many early works in this field including a first edition of Adam Smith's An Inquiry into the Nature and Causes of the Wealth of Nations, 1776;
- Joseph Needham Collection: a small collection of Chinese books and serials on mathematics and physics is located in the Hancock Library.
- Kapper Collection: approximately 1250 volumes reflects the selection available on the shelves of a small town Australian bookshop about 50 years ago.
- Kohler Collection: Edwardian novels.

== ANU Archives ==
Noel Butlin Archives Centre and University Archives at the Menzies Library

The ANU Archives preserves the university's own archives and collects archives of business, trade unions, professional associations and industry bodies, to support research by the university community and the general public.

It collects in two areas, the University Archives and the Noel Butlin Archives Centre.

=== University Archives ===
The University Archives hold a range of material dating from the late 1920s relating to the history of The Australian National University. This material is available under a 30-year rule (progressing to a 20-year rule by 2021) which means that records up to the mid-1980s can be generally used for research. The collection includes minutes of the ANU Council and other university committees, correspondence files, photographs, plans, and publications such as annual reports and the ANU Reporter. The papers of academic and senior staff of the university and university organisations are also part of the University Archives. The acquisition of material is governed by a collecting policy.

=== Noel Butlin Archives Centre ===
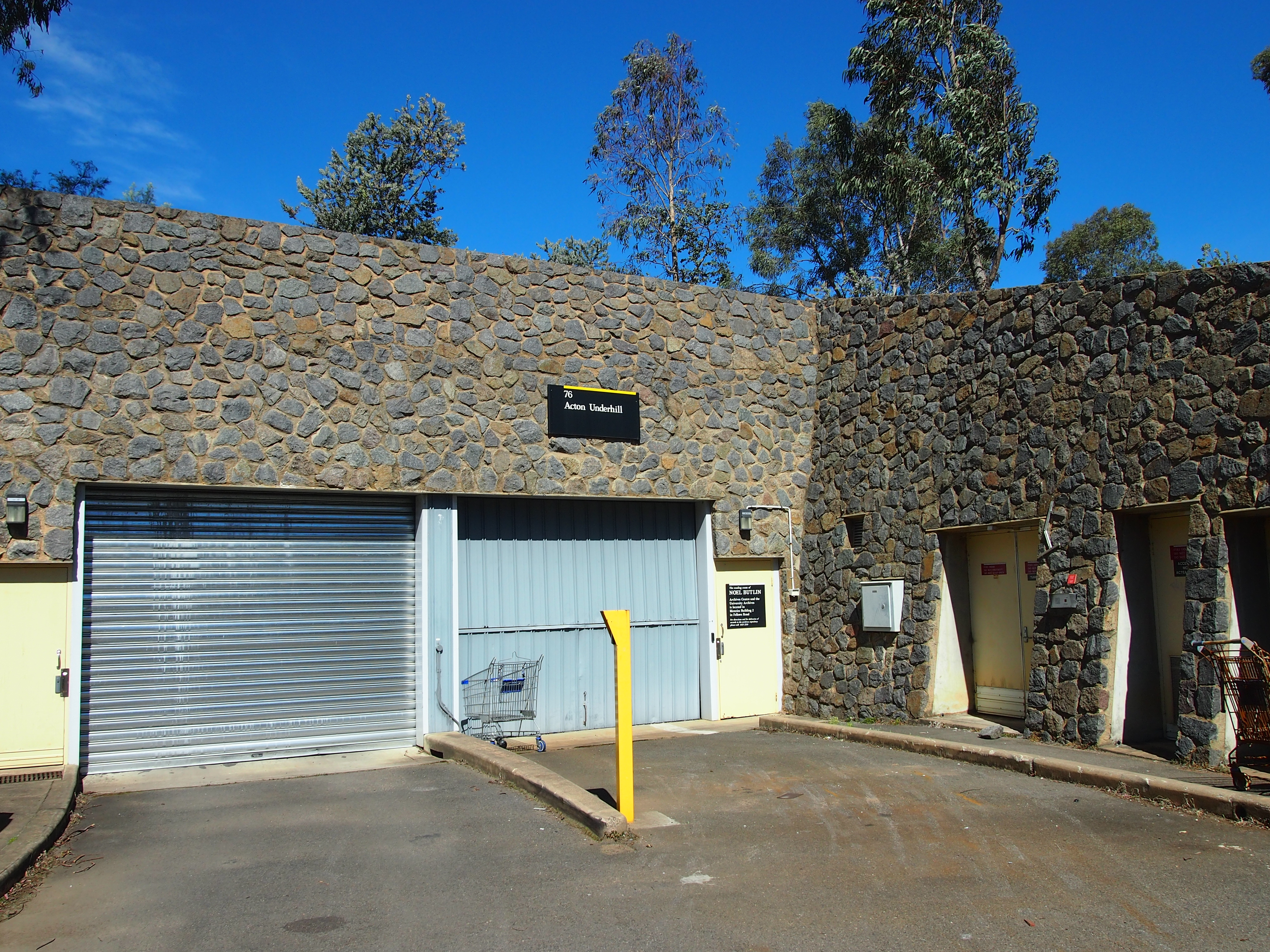
The entrance to the Acton Underhill facility which houses the Noel Butlin Archives

The Noel Butlin Archives Centre (NBAC) collects business and labour records from Australian companies, trade unions, industry bodies and professional organisations. They are a national organisation interested in material from all states and territories. The NBAC holds the records of large companies such as the Australian Agricultural Company, Burns Philip, CSR Ltd, Dalgety's, Tooth and Company and the Adelaide Steamship Company as well as those of smaller businesses such as pastoral stations. They hold records of federally registered trade unions and their predecessors, and of peak councils such as the Australian Council of Trade Unions (ACTU) and the National Farmers Federation. The records date from the 1820s to the early 21st century and include files, photographs, minutes of meetings, some staff and membership records, maps and plans, and publications such as trade journals and union newsletters. Some material may be closed because it is very recent or the owners' permission may be required before it can be used.

The collection supports research on topics such as industrial relations, immigration, working women, indigenous employment, architecture, economic history, family history, social history in Australia and the Pacific, and on particular industries such as agriculture, timber, shipping, mining, brewing, advertising and finance. In addition, the Archives contain the National AIDS Archive Collection, which documents the history of HIV/AIDS education and prevention throughout Australia.

The Noel Butlin Archives collection is divided into the following categories:

Companies, Organisations including trade unions and professional associations, Personal Papers, National AIDS Archive Collection, Maps, Photographs.

The acquisition of material is governed by a collecting policy.

The site, and the collection, received considerable public attention after it was featured by the Australian Broadcasting Corporation's station, ABC Local Radio 666AM, in early January 2014, including an online story. At this time the archives were stored in the upper levels of the Acton Tunnel which passes under the ANU campus.
