= Acton, Australian Capital Territory =

Suburb of Canberra, Australia

Acton
- Suburb
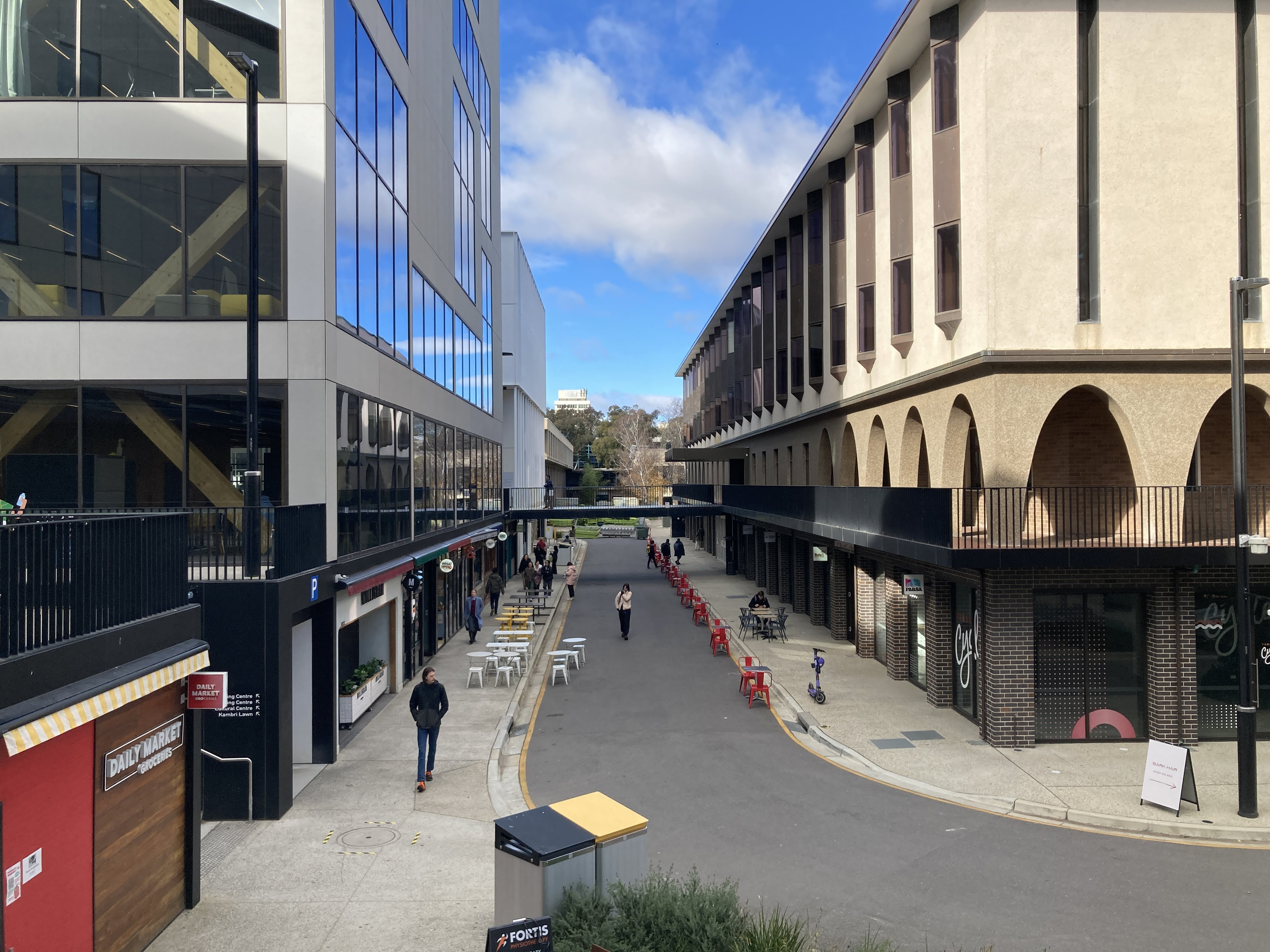
- Joplin Lane, 2024

- Country: Australia
- State: Australian Capital Territory
- City: Canberra
- District: North Canberra
- Location: 2 km (1.2 mi) W of Canberra CBD; 17 km (11 mi) WNW of Queanbeyan; 87 km (54 mi) SW of Goulburn; 286 km (178 mi) SW of Sydney
- Established: 1928

Government
  - Territory electorate: Kurrajong
  - Federal division: Canberra
- Elevation: 567 m (1,860 ft)

Population
  - Total: 2,848 (2021 census)
- Postcode: 2601
Suburbs around Acton
O'Connor	O'Connor	Turner
Black Mountain	Acton	City
Yarralumla	Lake Burley Griffin	Parkes

Acton is a suburb of Canberra, ACT, Australia. Acton covers an area west of the CBD, bordered by Black Mountain to the west and Lake Burley Griffin in the south.

The Australian National University campus covers most of Acton, though other sites in the suburb include the National Film and Sound Archive located in the former Institute of Anatomy building, the National Museum of Australia on the Acton Peninsula, and New Acton, which was developed as a unique urban precinct around Acton House in phases from 2006 to 2019.

At the 2021 census Acton had a population of 2,848 people, mostly students living at the Australian National University.

== History ==
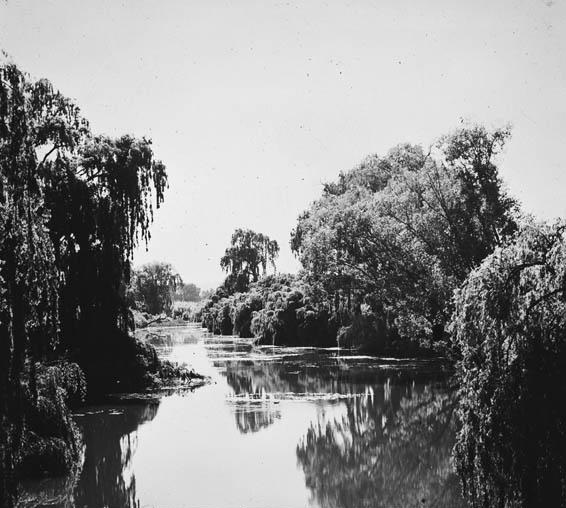
Molonglo River at Acton in 1920

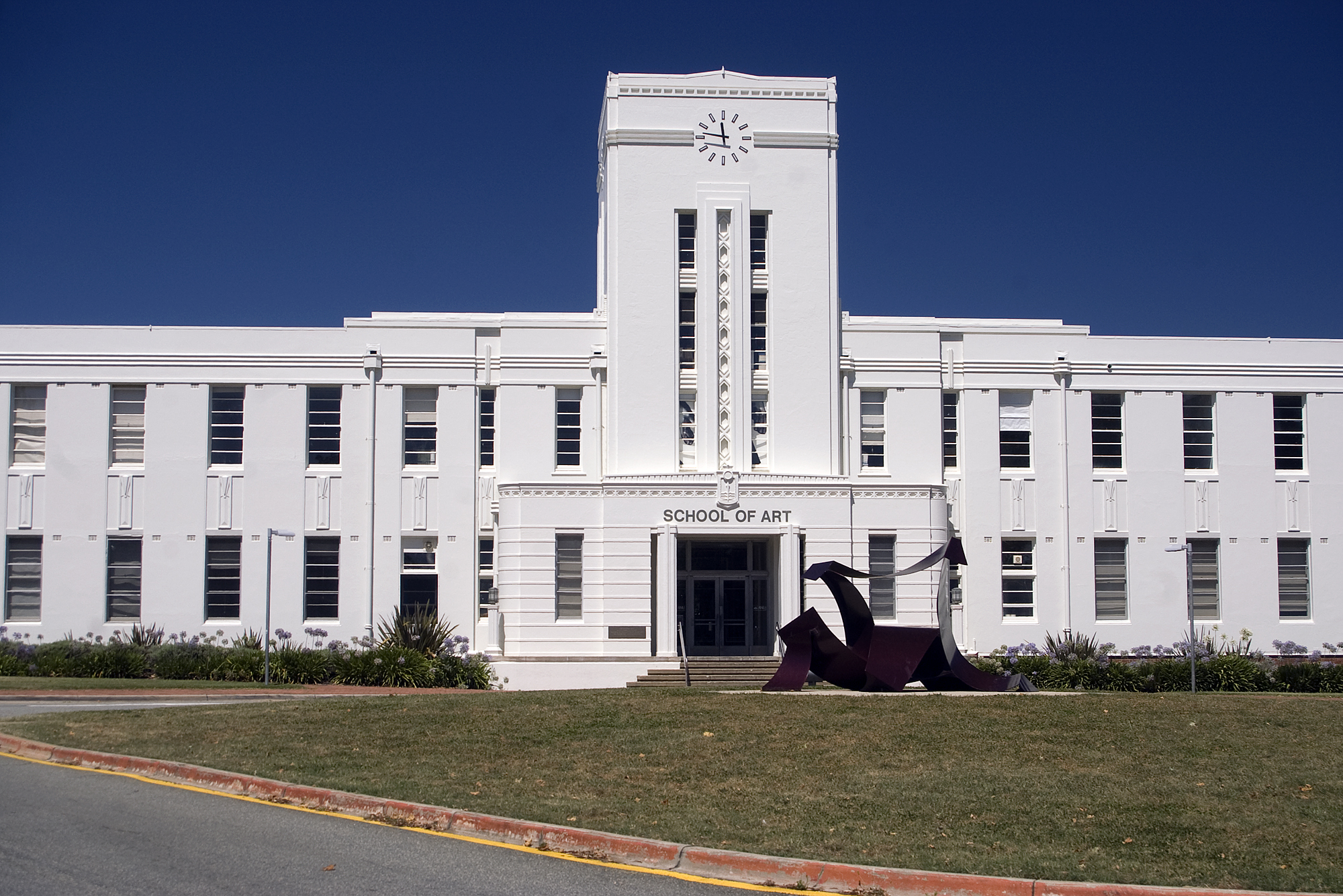
ANU School of Art

Acton was inhabited by Aboriginal Australian groups for thousands of years before European occupation. Part of this history is documented by the ANU Aboriginal and Torres Strait Islander Heritage Trail. Sullivans Creek, which flows through Acton, provided a culturally significant source of food and resources for Aboriginal people. According to historian Bill Gammage, part of the area now used as the South Oval was purposely deforested by Aboriginal people, to form a grassland area that may have been used for hunting kangaroos, camping, or as an area to await smoke signals from nearby. Scarred trees in Acton suggest that their bark provided a valuable resource.

The suburb is named in recognition of one of the region's original homesteads 'Acton' which was sited near the present-day National Museum at the end of Liversidge Street.

With the establishment of the Federal Capital in 1911, territory administrators erected a temporary workers camp in the vicinity of 'Acton Homestead', since demolished, to house staff coordinating the development of the National Capital. The chief Surveyor Scrivener occupied Acton Homestead at an early stage during his survey of the capital site. The Bachelors' Quarters above Lennox Crossing, now renamed Lennox House, became the city's first guest house.

The alignment of Liversidge Street and Lennox Crossing follows the original line of the pre-1911 road towards the major ford across the Molonglo River. A low bridge and causeway was erected in 1911, at the site of the original river ford in an area subsequently inundated by Lake Burley Griffin.

The Acton Tunnel was built below a hill in the suburb between 1976 and 1979 as part on an extension of Parkes Way.

In 2011 a proposal was launched to build the Australia Forum, a major convention centre complex, on the lake shoreline in Acton.

The Acton Waterfront is currently being developed, starting with Henry Rolland Park in 2018 and a boardwalk completed in 2022. Ngamarawai, Ngunnawal for 'cave place' (referring to limestone caves now beneath Lake Burley Griffin), will be the completed park replacing a temporary one by 2028. The waterfront will also become a neighbourhood with improved connections to New Acton.

== Demographics ==
In the 2021 census, the population of Acton was 2,848. In 2011, 56.9% of the population was foreign-born, the highest for any Canberra suburb.

== Geology ==
The southern part of Acton has a complicated arrangement of sediments that include the Pittman Formation greywacke and the black-coloured Acton Shale Member from the Ordovician age. Then from the Silurian age there is mudstone, State Circle Shale, and Camp Hill Sandstone. Some limestone is found near the National Museum of Australia.

Calcareous shales from the Canberra Formation are overlain by Quaternary alluvium on the north. This rock is the limestone of the original title of Canberra, "Limestone Plains". Tertiary-age pebbly gravels are left from when the Molonglo river was at a higher level.
