= Drakeford Drive =

Road in Canberra, Australia

Drakeford Drive Australian Capital Territory

General information
- Type: Road
- Length: 9 km (5.6 mi)

Major junctions
- North end: Tuggeranong Parkway; Kambah, Australian Capital Territory
- Sulwood Drive; Athllon Drive; Isabella Drive
- South end: Tharwa Drive; Calwell, Australian Capital Territory

Location(s)
- Major suburbs: Kambah, Oxley, Tuggeranong, Isabella Plains, Bonython, Calwell

Drakeford Drive is an arterial road in the Tuggeranong district of the Australian Capital Territory, a southern suburb of the nation's capital Canberra. The road is named for Arthur Drakeford, Federal Minister for Air and Civil Aviation from 1941 to 1949. The route extends as a divided dual carriageway from the southern end of the Tuggeranong Parkway at Kambah, passing east of Lake Tuggeranong and continues to the suburb of Calwell where it joins Tharwa Drive. The speed limit on Drakeford Drive is 80 km/h (50 mph). In 2012, a large sculpture by artist Alexander Knox, entitled Moth Ascending the Capital was erected on the median strip in Kambah, drawing local criticism about its necessity. In September 2012, a pedestrian overpass over Drakeford Drive was completed, allowing a safer and more convenient crossing for students from Namadgi School in Kambah.

Drakeford Drive also lends its name to the football rivalry between Burns Football Club and Tuggeranong United Football Club, who play each other in the game known as "The Drakeford Derby".
