= Tharwa Drive =

Road in Australian Capital Territory, Australia

Tharwa Drive Australian Capital Territory

General information
- Type: Road
- Length: 11.5 km (7.1 mi)
- Former route number: ACT Tourist Drive 5

Major junctions
- North end: Monaro Highway; Calwell, Australian Capital Territory
- Johnson Drive; Drakeford Drive; Tidbinbilla Road
- South end: Naas Road; Tharwa, Australian Capital Territory

Location(s)
- Major suburbs: Lanyon Valley

Tharwa Drive is an arterial road, in the southern Australian Capital Territory. The road extends from the Monaro Highway through the Tuggeranong district in Canberra's southern suburbs, connecting with Drakeford Drive before continuing south through the Lanyon Valley and crossing the Murrumbidgee River at the village of Tharwa. Tharwa Drive provides access to the historic Lanyon Homestead, the Murrumbidgee Corridor nature reserve. Restoration of the heritage listed Tharwa Bridge, which carries the road over the Murrumbidgee was completed in 2011, following several years of closures and traffic restrictions.
