= Gungahlin Drive Extension =

Road in Canberra, Australia

Gungahlin Drive Extension GDE / Gungahlin Drive Australian Capital Territory

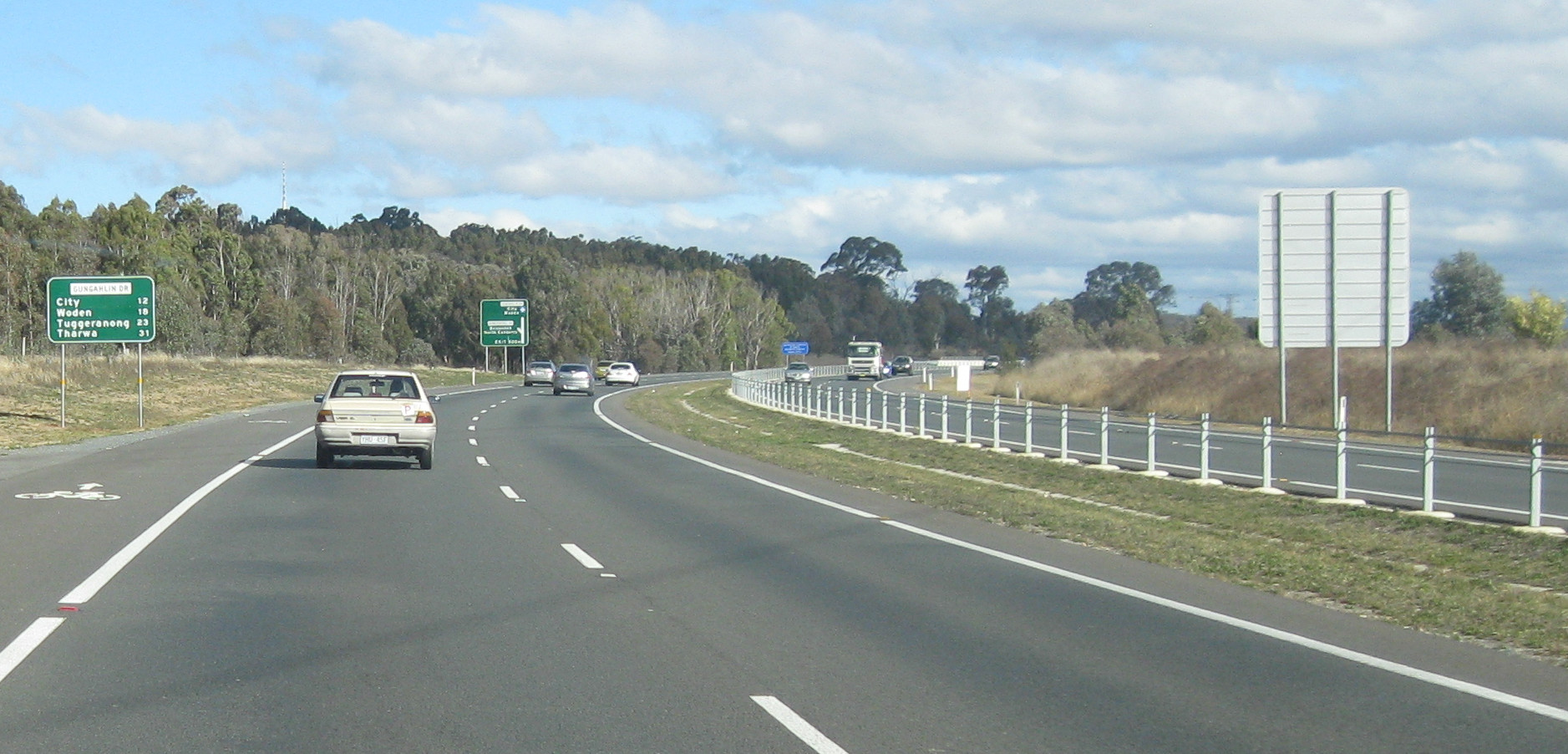
- Gungahlin Drive heading southbound, just after Ellenborough Street overpass

General information
- Type: Parkway
- Length: 8.3 km (5.2 mi)
- Maintained by: Transport Canberra & City Services
- History: Stage 1 completed in 2008; Stage 2 completed in 2011

Major junctions
- North end: Gungahlin Drive; Kaleen, Australian Capital Territory
- Barton Highway; Ginninderra Drive; Belconnen Way; Parkes Way
- South end: Tuggeranong Parkway; Molonglo Valley, Australian Capital Territory

Highway system
- Highways in Australia; National Highway • Freeways in Australia; Road infrastructure in Canberra

Gungahlin Drive Extension (GDE) is a motorway grade road, located in the Belconnen district of Canberra, Australia. It is 8.3 kilometres long and extended the previously existing Gungahlin Drive from the Barton Highway in the district of Gungahlin to the Glenloch Interchange to connect with the Tuggeranong Parkway, Parkes Way, and William Hovell Drive. Early in the planning stages, the GDE was to instead be designated the John Dedman Parkway.

== Route description ==
The GDE consists of two roads: the section of Gungahlin Drive located between Barton Highway and Belconnen Way, and Caswell Drive, located between Belconnen Way and the Glenloch Interchange. Caswell Drive was pre-existing but duplicated and upgraded as part of the works.

The extension was originally opened with a speed limit of 80 km/h (50 mph), but after review was increased to 90 km/h (56 mph)

== History ==
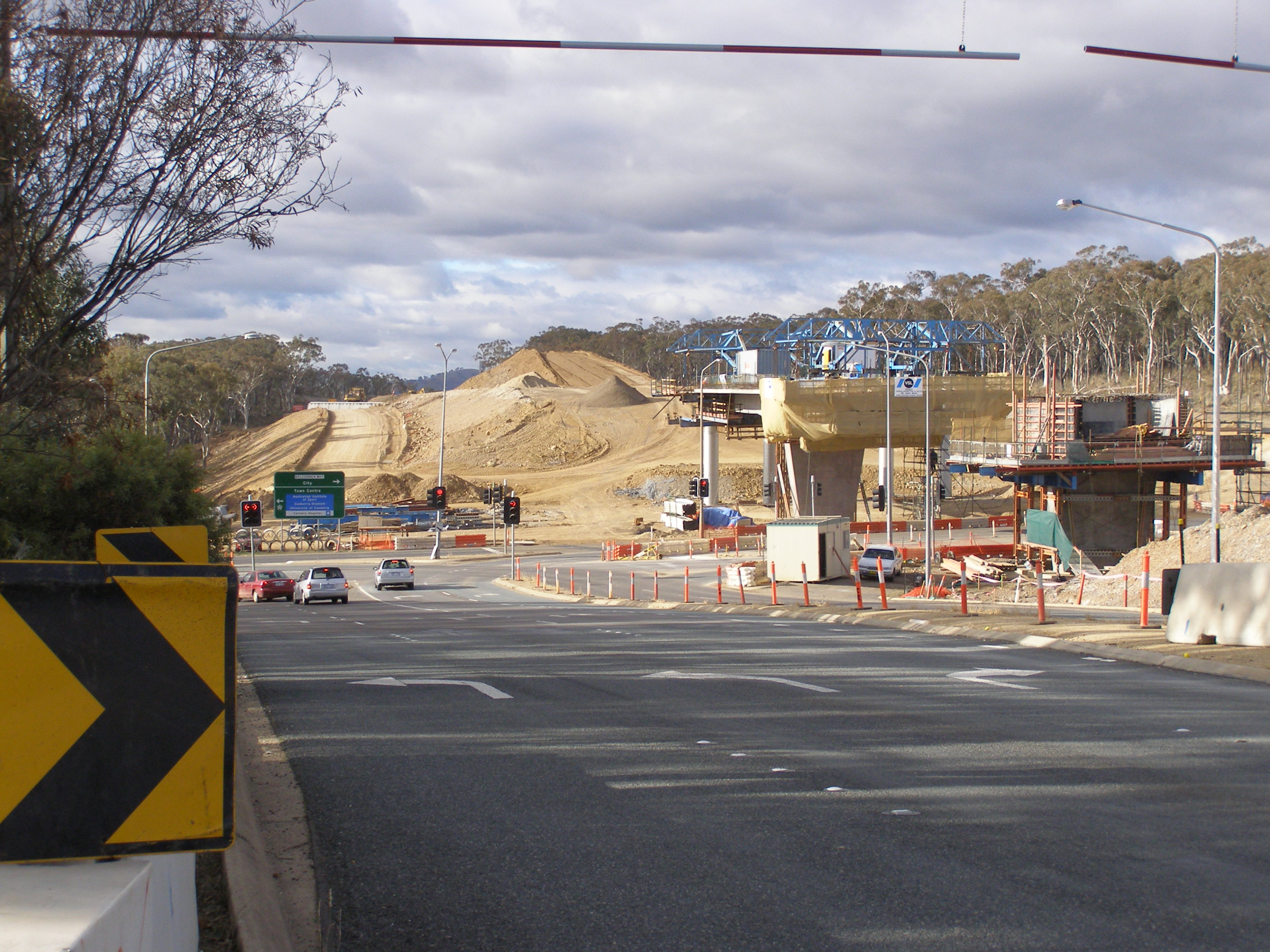
Construction of the GDE at Belconnen Way and Caswell Dr

The Gungahlin Drive Extension project had its genesis in planning that emphasised the motor car as the primary means of travel in Canberra. This philosophy is shown in planning studies dating from the 1960s.

In 1991, the ACT Liberal Government began consultations for a John Dedman Parkway project, which would have gone from the Barton Highway to Belconnen Way. This project was subsequently renamed the Gungahlin Drive Extension, with the road proceeding to the Glenloch Interchange.

The ACT Labor Government won election in 2001 promising a GDE alignment that would travel west of the Australian Institute of Sport AIS. However, the Commonwealth Government's National Capital Authority decided in December 2002 to support an alignment east of the AIS as the preferred route. On 16 January 2003 the ACT Government fell in with the NCA and decided to investigate options for an Eastern Alignment for GDE in the vicinity of the AIS, as well as reviewing options for the alignment in the Aranda Precinct. Supporters of natural parkland campaigned to have the road building stopped, staging a number of demonstrations. However the ACT Government determined that the road be built, and subsequently changed the law to prevent further opposition from community groups.

When the GDE was completed it was controversial as the road was originally built to a 2-lane standard rather than four; leaving southbound and northbound commuters with lengthy delays each morning and afternoon.

Work commenced in October 2009 to widen the 2 lane sections to 4 lanes as originally planned. The area near the south bound lanes leading into the Glenloch interchange was the first area to be widened as this area bears the heaviest traffic load during peak times.

The road has now been completed to a 4 lane freeway standard.

== Protests ==
When the Gungahlin Drive Extension plans were made public, there were protests by various groups in order to stop or delay work on the road. The main protests came from a group called "Save The Ridge". This group were angry about the destruction of the flora and fauna that would occur with the GDE running through the Bruce / O'Connor Ridge. Meanwhile, another group called GDE Now! was formed, with a slogan 'Pave the Ridge'.

In 2004 Save The Ridge had a legal victory with the ACT Government in relation to local planning laws. The ACT Government then passed a new law with the purpose of overriding further legal challenges at the local level.

In 2005 Save The Ridge took the ACT Government and the National Capital Authority to the Federal Court of Australia in a further effort to have the project shut down. In September 2005 the Federal Court ruled in favour of the NCA and the ACT Government, giving the go-ahead for the project to resume.

On 10 December 2006, during Stage 1 of the GDE opening, Save The Ridge again protested against the road, and called for an immediate halt to the rest of the construction taking place. They called the GDE "one of the most expensive non tunnelled single lane roads per kilometre in Australia's history."

== Bridge collapse ==
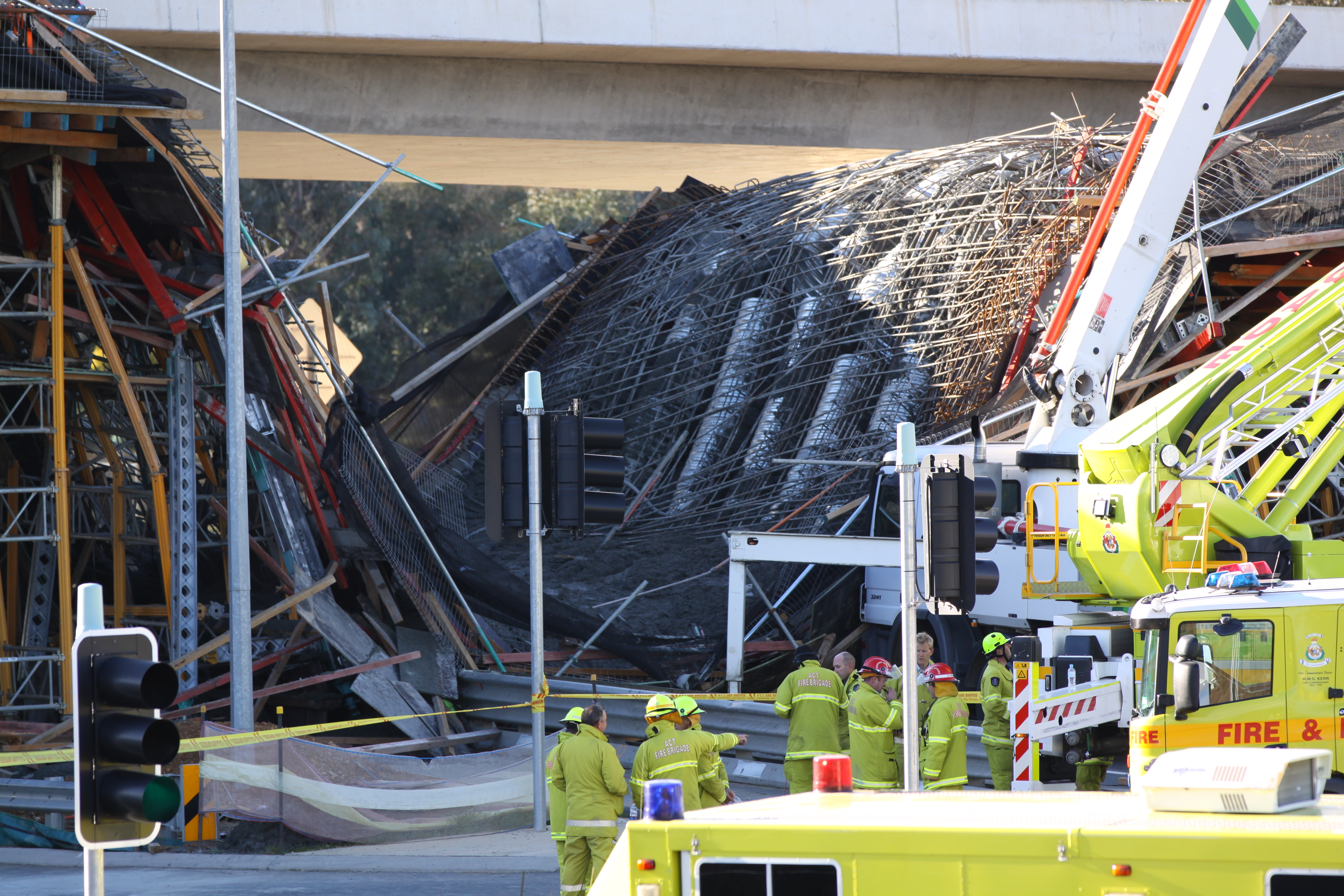
GDE Bridge after the collapse

On 14 August 2010, the eastern duplication bridge of the GDE, over the Barton Highway, partially collapsed while under construction. ACT Police, ACT Ambulance Service and the ACT Fire Brigade attended the scene and freed one man who was trapped under the rubble. At least nine people were taken to the Canberra Hospital for treatment and another five were injured, but none were critical. All those affected were working on a new span of the bridge. The Barton Highway and northern GDE were closed for several hours as investigations commenced.

The Barton Highway was reopened on 9 September 2010 after investigations and removal of the collapsed bridge. Reconstruction of the second span started at the end of December 2010 with all contractors taking note of the recommendations made by ACT Workcover relating to worker safety and the use of materials.

== Interchanges ==
The GDE has multiple interchanges along its length providing access to suburbs and facilities in the Gungahlin and Belconnen districts as well as the Inner North, there are links to several arterial roads.

District	Location	km	mi	Destinations	Notes
Gungahlin, Belconnen	Mitchell, Kaleen	0	0.0	Barton Highway (A25) – Civic, Hall, Yass / Gungahlin Drive – Gungahlin	Modified diamond interchange, signal-controlled access onto Barton Highway; GDE Terminus: continues northeast as Gungahlin Drive
Belconnen	Kaleen, Bruce	2.3	1.4	Ginninderra Drive – Lyneham, North Canberra, Belconnen, Australian Institute of Sport, Canberra Stadium	Diamond interchange, signal-controlled access onto Ginninderra Drive
Belconnen, Canberra Central	Bruce, Aranda	5.1	3.2	Belconnen Way – Civic, Belconnen, Calvary Hospital	Freeway-over SPUI, with additional U-turn ramps. Northbound access to Bandjalong Crescent via U-Turn at this exit; End: Gungahlin Drive; Start: Caswell Drive
Belconnen	Aranda	5.7	3.5	Bandjalong Crescent – Aranda	Partial diamond interchange, no northbound exit, also linked to on/offramps of Belconnen Way interchange.
Belconnen, Molonglo Valley, Canberra Central		8.3	5.2	Tuggeranong Parkway / Parkes Way / William Hovell Drive (all via Glenloch Interchange) – Civic, Woden, Tuggeranong, Belconnen	Modified partial three-level turbine interchange, no eastbound to northbound ramp, no southbound to westbound ramp; End: Caswell Drive; GDE Terminus: continues south as Tuggeranong Parkway.
1.000 mi = 1.609 km; 1.000 km = 0.621 mi: Incomplete access

== See also ==
- Freeways in Australia
- Freeways in Canberra
