= Hindmarsh Drive =

Road in Canberra, Australia

Hindmarsh Drive Australian Capital Territory
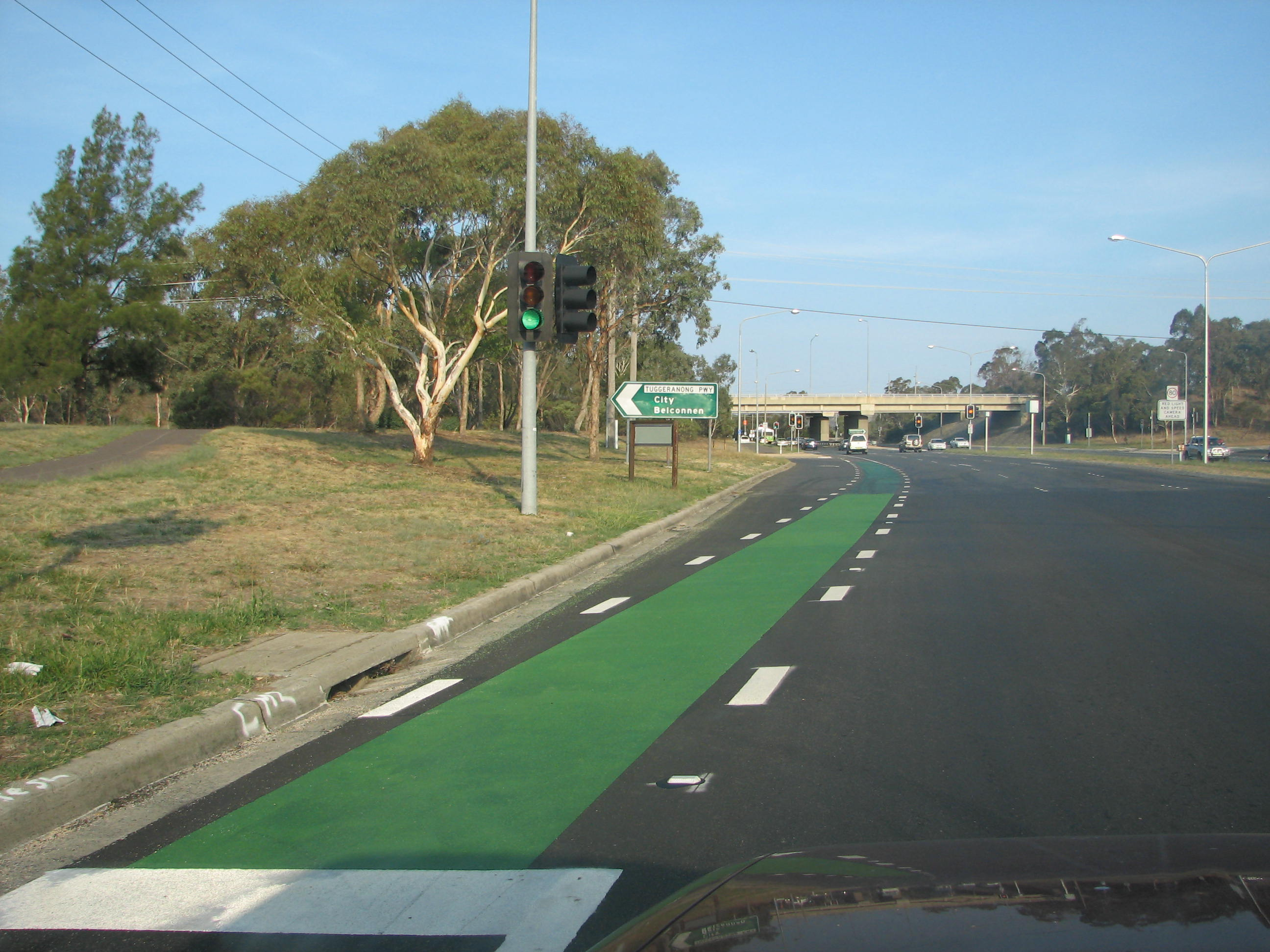
- Hindmarsh Drive in January 2007

General information
- Type: Road
- Length: 14 km (8.7 mi)

Major junctions
- West end: Eucumbene Drive; Duffy, Australian Capital Territory
- Streeton Drive; Tuggeranong Parkway; Athllon Drive; Yamba Drive; Monaro Highway; Newcastle Street
- East end: Canberra Avenue; Symonston, Australian Capital Territory

Location(s)
- Major suburbs: Woden Town Centre

Hindmarsh Drive is a major arterial road in the southern suburbs of Canberra, the capital city of Australia. It is named after John Hindmarsh, first Governor of South Australia. The road forms the major east to west link through the Woden Valley and Weston Creek districts, and is an important access corridor for both Canberra Hospital and the Woden Town Centre. Hindmarsh Drive is intersected by both the Monaro Highway and Tuggeranong Parkway at grade separated intersections. In 2010, the ACT Government announced that Hindmarsh Drive would be the site of the first point-to-point average speed cameras to be installed in the Territory. The cameras became operational on 27 February 2012.
