= Glenloch Interchange =

Interchange in Canberra, Australia

Glenloch Interchange Australian Capital Territory
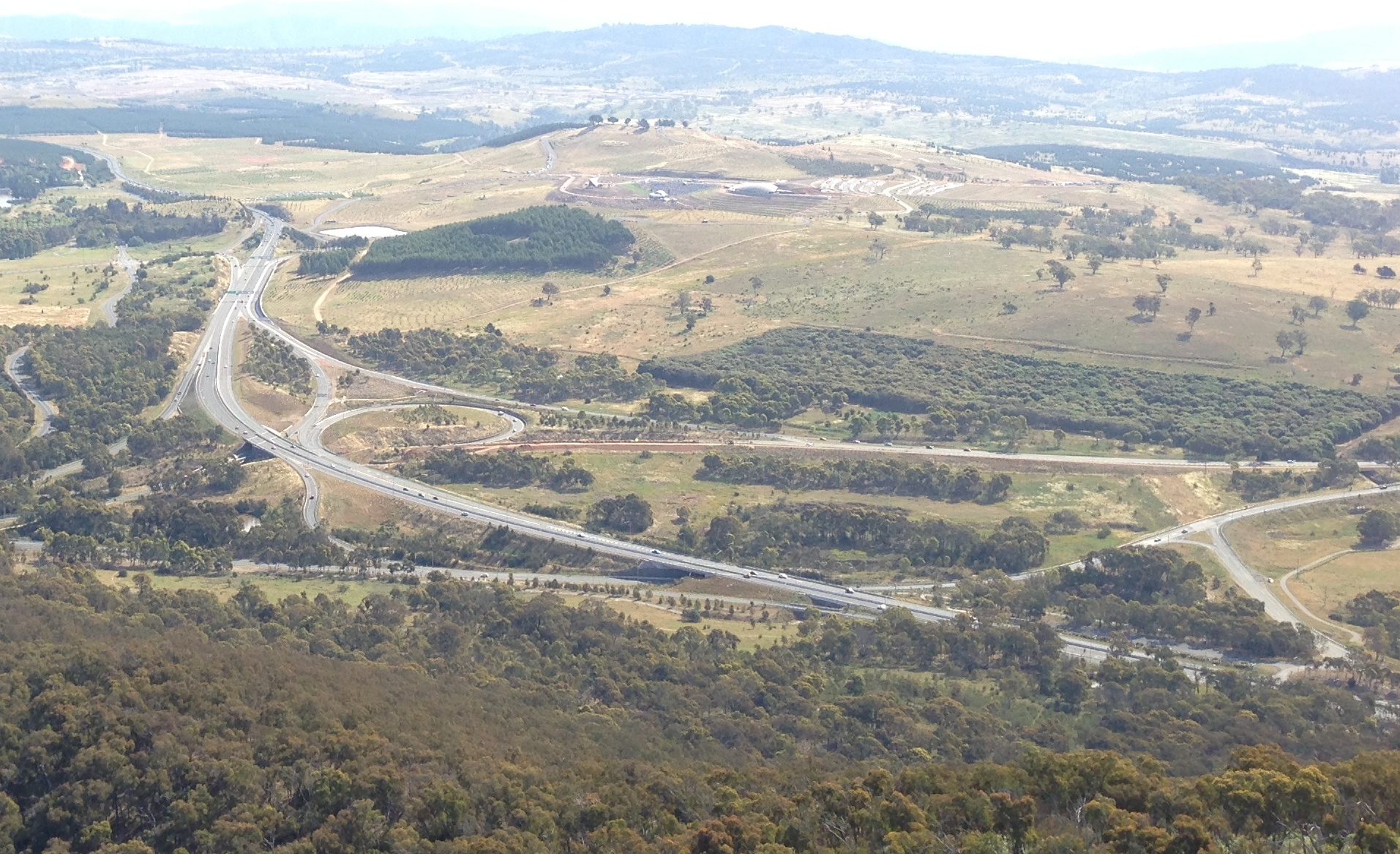
- View from nearby Black Mountain Tower, November 2012.
- Coordinates: 35°17′5.02″S 149°5′2.57″E

General information
- Type: Road junction
- Junction type: Modified partial three-level turbine interchange
- Location: Molonglo Valley, Canberra
- Spans: 6
- Maintained by: Territory and Municipal Services
- Roads at junction: Tuggeranong Parkway; Parkes Way; Caswell Drive (GDE); William Hovell Drive

The Glenloch Interchange is major road interchange in Canberra, Australia. It one of the busiest road interchanges in the Australian Capital Territory, connecting the Tuggeranong Parkway with Parkes Way, William Hovell Drive and Caswell Drive (Gungahlin Drive Extension).

== History ==
The interchange was originally built in the 1970s.

A major reconstruction lasting from 2007 to mid-2008 removed traffic lights from the interchange. The new alignment resulted in retention of a bridge over both Caswell Drive and William Hovell Drive that was disconnected as a result of the works. This was finally removed in late 2010 during roadworks to upgrade the new interchange to dual carriageway standards.

In 2021, the ACT Government identified the Glenloch Interchange as a focal point when planning for major upgrades of the transport corridors connecting the city with districts in the south and west.

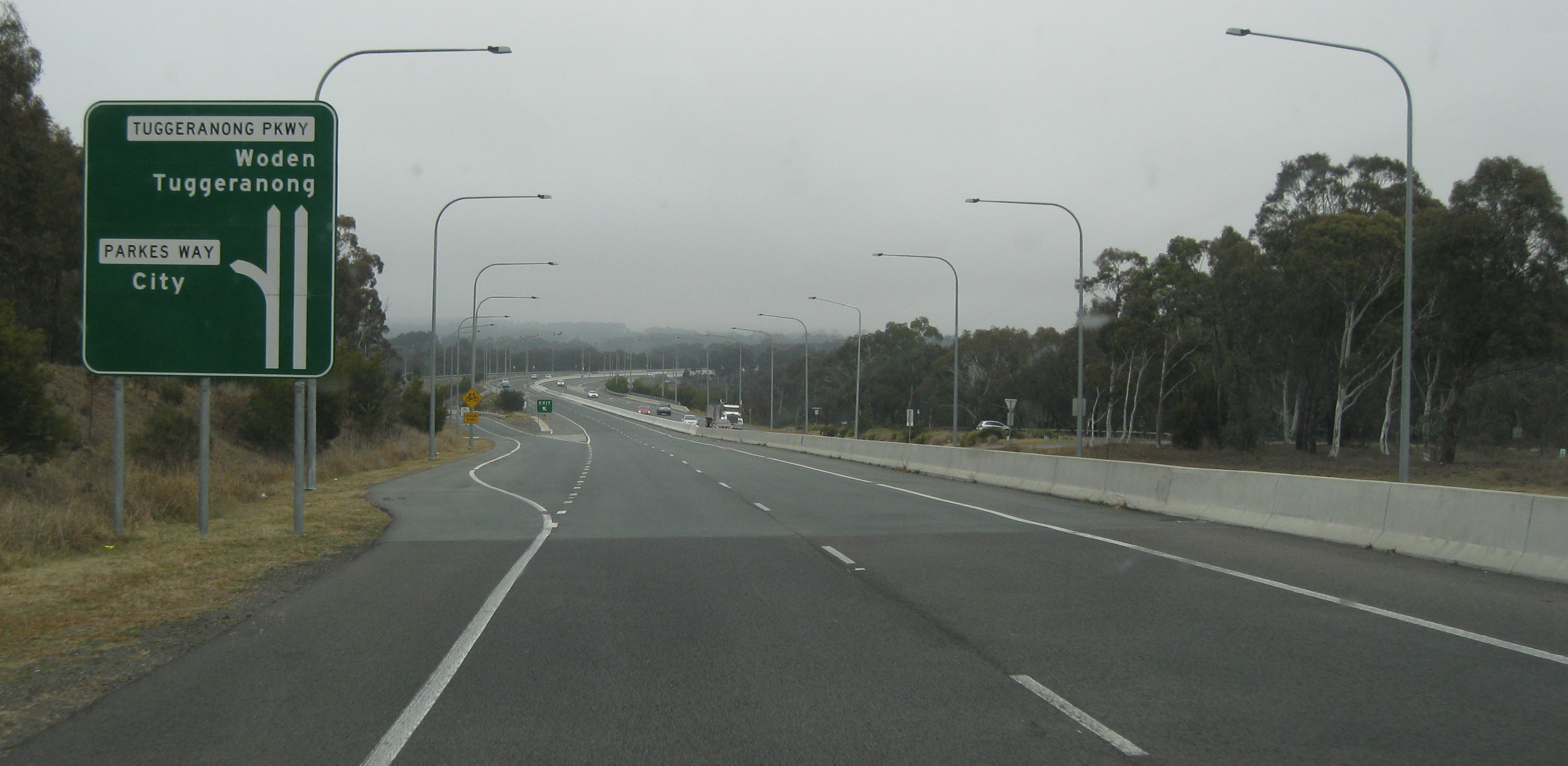
View of Glenloch Interchange, approaching via Caswell Drive (Gungahlin Drive Extension).
