= Gungahlin Drive =

Road in Canberra, Australia

Gungahlin Drive Australian Capital Territory

General information
- Type: Road
- Length: 7.4 km (4.6 mi)

Major junctions
- North end: Horse Park Drive; Clarrie Hermes Drive; Ngunnawal, Australian Capital Territory
- Gundaroo Drive; Barton Highway
- South end: Gungahlin Drive Extension; Kaleen, Australian Capital Territory

Gungahlin Drive is an arterial road in Canberra, Australia. Its urban portion is 7.4 km (5 mi) long, and serves as one of the major thoroughfares in the Gungahlin district, before becoming a parkway standard roadway south of the Barton Highway. This high quality section was built as the major part of the Gungahlin Drive Extension project.

== Route description ==
The route begins at roundabout that forms the end of Clarrie Hermes Drive, and Horse Park Drive. It heads in a roughly south-easterly direction, passing by several suburbs, and becoming dual carriageway to the east of Gundaroo Drive. It then crosses between the Mulanggari and Gungaderra Grasslands and heads in a southerly direction along the western edge of the Mitchell industrial area. It then switches to a southwesterly heading and crosses over the Barton Highway, the interchange at this location also marks the transition to the start of the Gungahlin Drive Extension, built to parkway standards.

== Junctions ==
Gungahlin Drive has multiple junctions along its length providing access to suburbs and facilities in the Gungahlin and Belconnen districts as well as the Inner North, there are links to several other arterial roads.

District	Location	km	mi	Destinations	Notes
Gungahlin	Ngunnawal, Nicholls	0	0.0	Horse Park Drive – Gungahlin, Majura / Clarrie Hermes Drive – Kinlyside	Roundabout
Gungahlin	Ngunnawal, Nicholls	0.7	0.43	Wanganeen Avenue – Ngunnawal / Kelleway Avenue – Nicholls	Roundabout
Gungahlin	Ngunnawal, Nicholls	1.5	0.93	Lexcen Avenue – Ngunnawal / Amagula Avenue – Nicholls	Roundabout
Gungahlin	Ngunnawal, Nicholls, Palmerston, Gungahlin	2.3	1.4	Gundaroo Drive – Crace, Nicholls	
Gungahlin	Palmerston, Gungahlin	2.6	1.6	Kosciuszko Avenue – Palmerston / The Valley Avenue – Gungahlin	
Gungahlin	Palmerston, Gungahlin	3.4	2.1	Kosciuszko Avenue – Palmerston	
Gungahlin	Gungahlin, Franklin	4.5	2.8	Oodgeroo Avenue – Franklin	Southbound access via LILO T-intersection
Gungahlin	Franklin, Mitchell	5.0	3.1	Well Station Drive – Harrison	
Gungahlin	Mitchell	6.5	4.0	Sandford Street – Kenny	
Gungahlin, Belconnen	Mitchell, Kaleen	7.4	4.6	Barton Highway – Civic, Hall, Yass / Gungahlin Drive Extension – Tuggeranong, Woden	Modified diamond interchange with single cloverleaf, signal-controlled access onto Barton Highway; roadway continues south-west as Gungahlin Drive Extension
1.000 mi = 1.609 km; 1.000 km = 0.621 mi: Route transition
