= University of Canberra Hospital =

Hospital in Australian Capital Territory

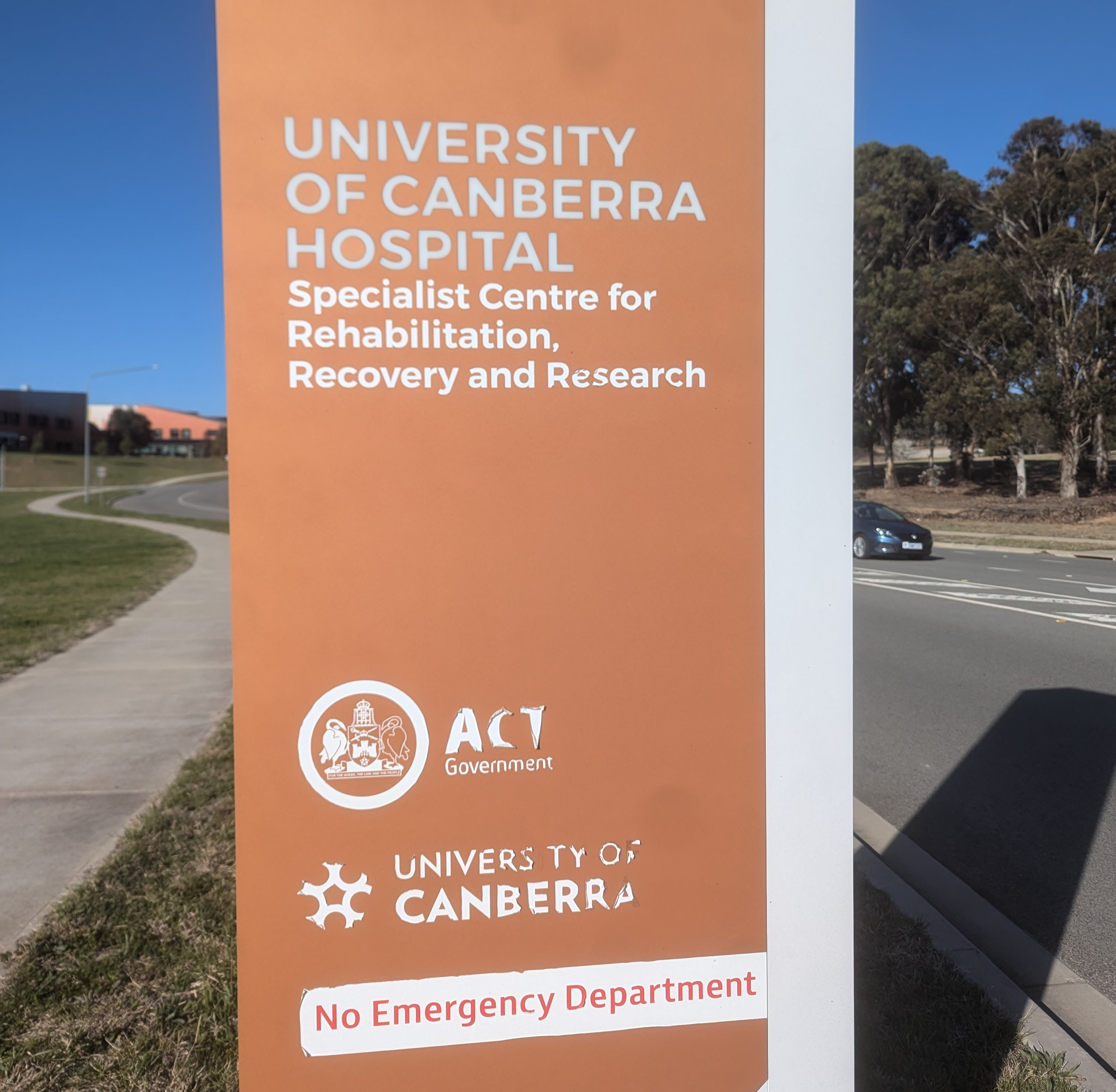
- A sign near the entrance of University of Canberra Hospital

Geography
- Location: Bruce, Australian Capital Territory, Australia
- Coordinates: 35.2328°S 149.0813°E

History
- Opened: February 2018

Links
- Website: www.canberra.edu.au/on-campus/facilities/university-of-canberra-hospital

The University of Canberra Hospital' (UCH), officially University of Canberra Hospital: Specialist Centre for Rehabilitation, Recovery and Research, is a public teaching hospital in Bruce, Australian Capital Territory (ACT), Australia. UCH is the third public hospital in the ACT, following Canberra Hospital and North Canberra Hospital. It was established as part of a networked hospital model intended to provide specialist subacute rehabilitation and recovery services while allowing the other two public hospitals to focus more on acute care.It is located on the north-western side of the University of Canberra campus and is operated by Canberra Health Services.

The hospital is a specialist subacute facility providing rehabilitation and recovery services, together with mental health and outpatient services. UCH does not function as an acute general hospital and does not have an emergency department or intensive care unit.

UCH has 140 inpatient beds, 75 day places and additional outpatient services. The hospital provides rehabilitation and recovery, with facilities including rehabilitation gyms, courtyards, kitchens, and a hydrotherapy pool.

== History ==
Plans for a new subacute public hospital at the University of Canberra were announced by the ACT Government in January 2012 as part of its health infrastructure program. The proposed hospital was initially planned to have 200 beds and was intended to provide subacute care, including rehabilitation and other services, as part of a network with Canberra Hospital and Calvary Public Hospital. By 2015, the planned facility had been revised to 140 overnight inpatient beds and 75 day places, with a focus on rehabilitation, aged care, and mental health care. The hospital was intended to provide care for patients transitioning from acute hospital treatment and to relieve pressure on acute hospitals by providing subacute care in a purpose-built facility.

Brookfield Multiplex was appointed as head contractor for the hospital construction in November 2015. The official sod-turning ceremony took place in February 2016, marking the commencement of construction.

During construction, a worker, Herman Holtz, 62, was killed on 4 August 2016 when a mobile crane overturned while moving a generator. The incident resulted in prosecutions under workplace health and safety legislation; in 2020 the crane driver pleaded guilty to a Category 1 offence, and in 2021 the principal contractor, Multiplex Constructions, was fined AU$150,000 for a safety breach relating to the incident.

Construction was completed in February 2018, when the building was formally handed over to ACT Health. The project had been planned for almost seven years.The total investment in the hospital and associated car park was AU$219 million.

The completed hospital was opened to the community on 16 June 2018, ahead of its official opening and commencement of patient services in July. A community open day provided public access to the hospital's therapy gyms, hydrotherapy pool, bedrooms, living spaces, and day-treatment areas. The hospital began taking patients in July 2018.

== Services and facilities ==
UCH provides specialist rehabilitation and recovery services for people recovering from surgery, illness or injury, as well as services for people experiencing mental illness.

The hospital's rehabilitation facilities include inpatient wards, rehabilitation gyms, therapy courtyards, kitchens and a hydrotherapy pool. Its design incorporates domestic-style spaces intended to help patients develop skills for independent living and prepare for returning home or moving to other forms of care.

Mental health services include the Adult Mental Health Rehabilitation Unit, a 20-bed specialist inpatient unit providing rehabilitation for adults with complex and enduring mental health needs.

The hospital does not provide emergency or intensive care. Patients requiring emergency treatment are directed to other hospitals in the ACT health system.

== Teaching and research ==
The hospital has a teaching and research relationship with the University of Canberra. The original plans for the hospital envisaged linking subacute healthcare services with the university's health education and research activities, including the training of healthcare professionals.

The partnership includes the Clinical Education and Research Centre (CERC), a shared education and research facility associated with the hospital. The CERC provides teaching and clinical training facilities for University of Canberra students and supports collaboration between health practitioners, educators and researchers.

== See also ==
- List of hospitals in the Australian Capital Territory
