= List of hospitals in the Australian Capital Territory =

This is a list of hospitals in Australian Capital Territory, Australia.

== Public ==
- North Canberra Hospital – Bruce
- The Canberra Hospital – Garran
- University of Canberra Hospital

== Private ==
- Calvary John James Hospital – Deakin
- Calvary Hospital – Bruce
- National Capital Private Hospital – Garran

== See also ==
- List of hospitals in Australia
