= Evatt, Australian Capital Territory =

Evatt
- Suburb
- Coordinates: 35°12′42″S 149°04′04″E
- Country: Australia
- State: Australian Capital Territory
- City: Canberra
- District: Belconnen
- Location: 12 km (7.5 mi) NW of Canberra CBD; 31 km (19 mi) WNW of Queanbeyan; 94 km (58 mi) SW of Goulburn; 291 km (181 mi) SW of Sydney
- Established: 1972

Government
  - Territory electorate: Ginninderra
  - Federal division: Fenner

Area
  - Total: 3.1 km^{2} (1.2 sq mi)
- Elevation: 610 m (2,000 ft)

Population
  - Total: 5,531 (SAL 2021)
- Postcode: 2617
Suburbs around Evatt
Spence	Spence	Nicholls
Melba	Evatt	Giralang
Florey	McKellar	McKellar

Evatt (/ˈɛvət/) is a suburb in the Belconnen district of Canberra, located within the Australian Capital Territory, Australia. Evatt lies between the suburbs of McKellar, Belconnen, Florey, Melba and Spence.

The suburb is named after Herbert Vere Evatt (1894–1965), a Justice of the High Court and Leader of the Opposition in the 1950s. The suburb was gazetted on 2 November 1972. Streets in the suburb are named after people associated with parliament, and law professionals.

Evatt has three neighbourhood ovals: Evatt Neighbourhood Oval, adjacent to Evatt Primary School; South West Evatt Oval, and St. Monica's Primary School oval.

Evatt is bordered by Copland Drive, Owen Dixon Drive, William Webb Drive and Ginninderra Drive.

== Education ==
The first school in the area used the building of the original Ginninderra Anglican church of St Paul situated at the corner block marked by the current Copland Drive, Moynihan Street, and Sharwood Crescent (opposite the current St Monica's church and school.) The property had been established in 1861 as "Glebe Farm", consisting of 0.5ha for the church and 1ha for the larger church yard and cemetery, and the remainder totalling 81ha for the farm to support the church's upkeep. This was a donation by Charles Campbell of Duntroon to the Anglican Church, from his original Ginninderra property. The first teacher was Hugh McPhee (until 1868) and the school closed in 1874 when the Ginninderra School opened to the north near the current Barton Highway.

Evatt currently has three local primary schools: Evatt Primary School, Miles Franklin Primary School and St. Monica's Primary School.

== Governance ==
For the purposes of Australian federal elections for the House of Representatives, Evatt is in the Division of Fenner.

For the purposes of Australian Capital Territory elections for the ACT Legislative Assembly, Evatt is in the Ginninderra electorate.

== Geology ==
A porphyry of Green-grey Dacitic intrusive containing large white feldspar crystals is found under almost all of Evatt including all north of Moynihan Street. Glebe Farm Adamellite intrusion forms a strip a couple of hundred metres wide coming from the east of the suburb just to the south of Moynihan Street. Green grey dacitic tuff from the Hawkins Volcanics occur in the south west corner. This corner is cut by the Deakin fault near Brebner Street. Right in the very south west corner is a patch of calcareous shale.

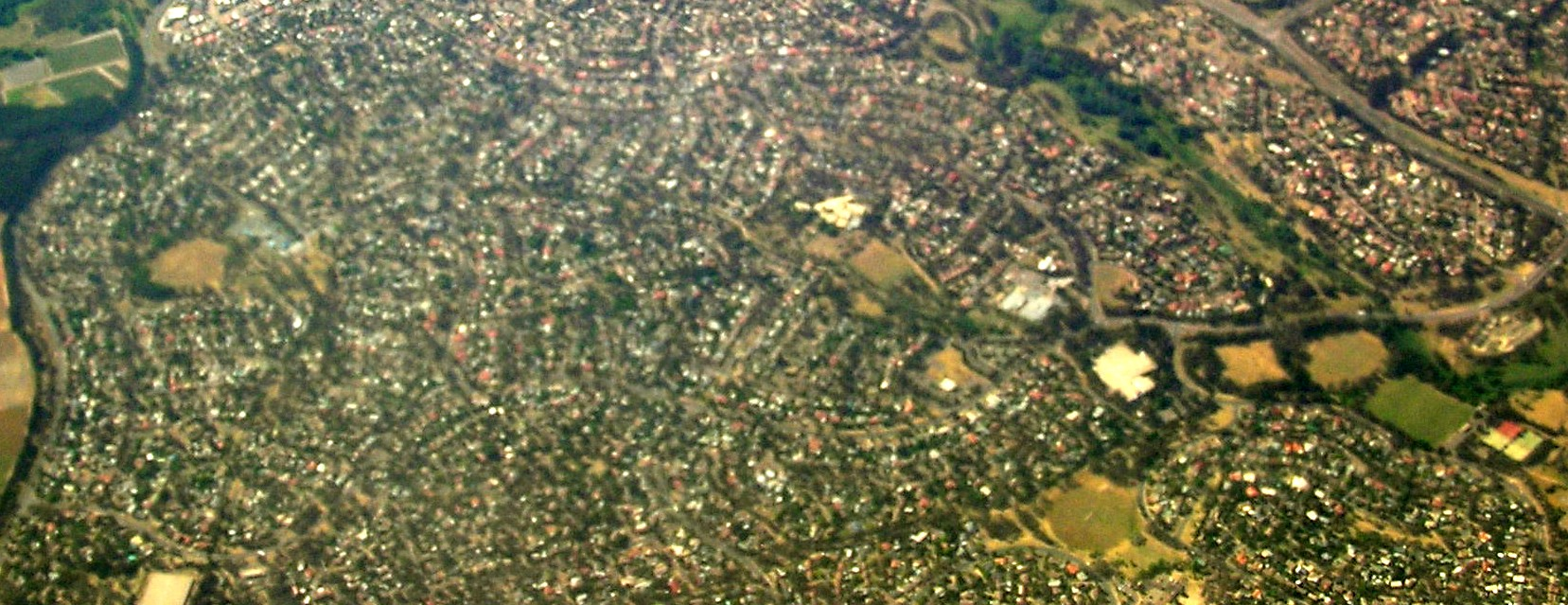
Aerial view of Evatt, from the west.
