= Lawson, Australian Capital Territory =

Lawson
- Suburb
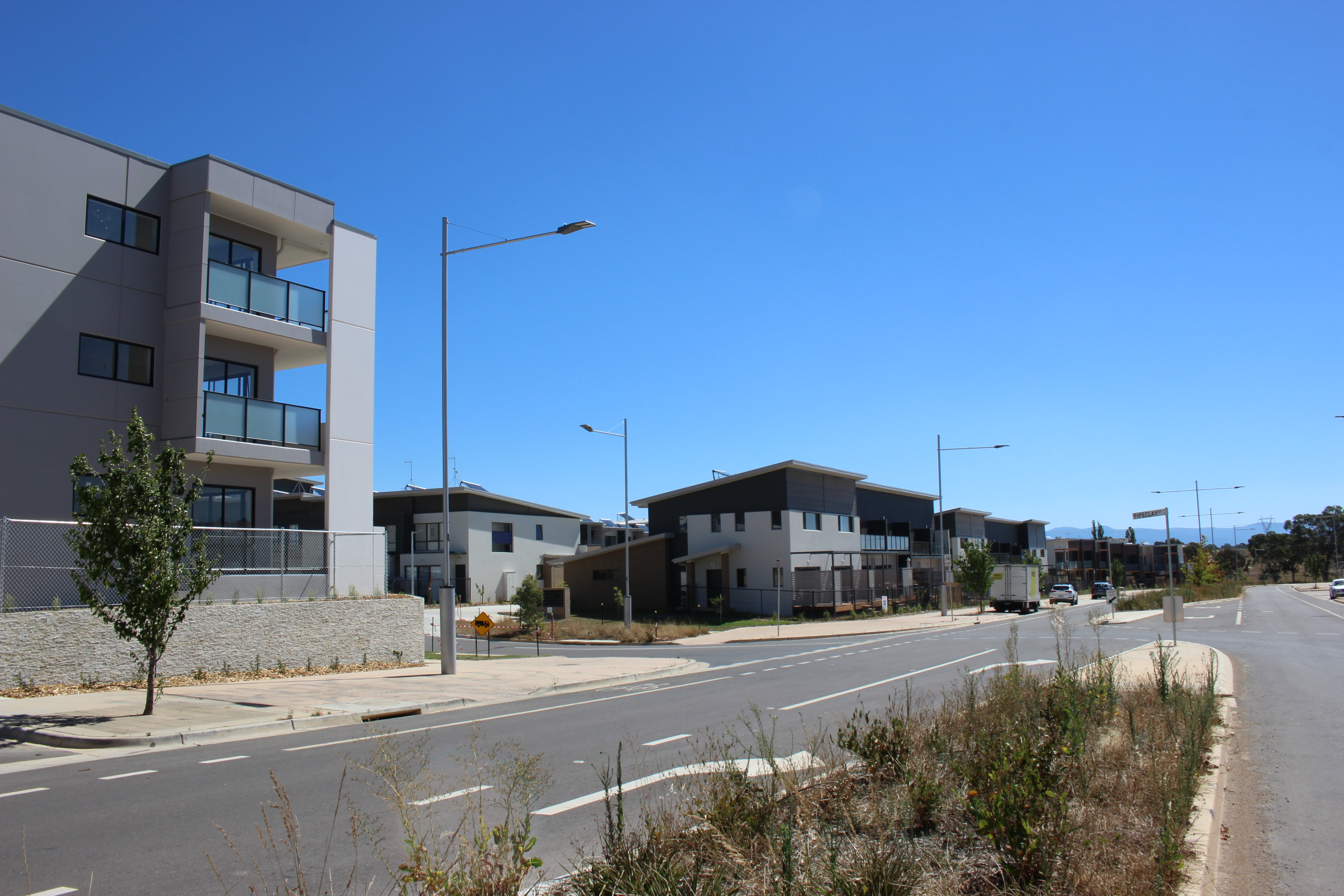
- Houses on Stockman Avenue

- Coordinates: 35°13′30″S 149°05′17″E
- Country: Australia
- State: Australian Capital Territory
- City: Canberra
- District: Belconnen
- Location: 11 km (6.8 mi) NW of Canberra CBD; 25 km (16 mi) NW of Queanbeyan; 93 km (58 mi) SW of Goulburn; 290 km (180 mi) SW of Sydney

Government
  - Territory electorate: Ginninderra
  - Federal division: Canberra

Area
  - Total: 3.1 km^{2} (1.2 sq mi)
- Elevation: 605 m (1,985 ft)

Population
  - Total: 2,739 (SAL 2021)
- Postcode: 2617
Suburbs around Lawson
McKellar	Giralang	Kaleen
McKellar	Lawson	Kaleen
Belconnen	Bruce	Bruce

Lawson (postcode: 2617) is a suburb in the Belconnen district of Canberra, located within the Australian Capital Territory, Australia. The suburb is surrounded by Baldwin Drive, Gundaroo Drive and Ginninderra Drive. It lies next to the suburbs of McKellar, Giralang, Kaleen, Bruce and Belconnen.

Two intersections were built in 2012 that lead into the suburb's grasslands, prepared for future development on the suburb, one leading off Ginninderra Drive, and another off Baldwin Drive. However, neither intersection continued on further than a few metres. Development was delayed by about two years by Commonwealth environmental clearance processes due to the presence of golden sun moth and native grassland. Construction of roads have commenced and the first residential land was sold on 3 December 2013.

The suburb derives its name from Henry Lawson, short story writer and poet. The streets in Lawson are named after aspects of Australia appearing in his writing. A bicycle path runs alongside Ginninderra Drive, another along the shore of the lake.

In June 2020, Defence Housing Australia (DHA) announced the proposed master development plan for Lawson North into a vibrant and connected community for Defence families and the local community. Key approvals were sought in late 2021. Following approvals, construction is anticipated to commence in 2023 and dwelling construction to be completed late 2024.

== Governance ==
For the purposes of Australian federal elections for the House of Representatives, Lawson is in the Division of Canberra.

For the purposes of Australian Capital Territory elections for the ACT Legislative Assembly, Lawson is in the Ginninderra electorate.

== Geology ==
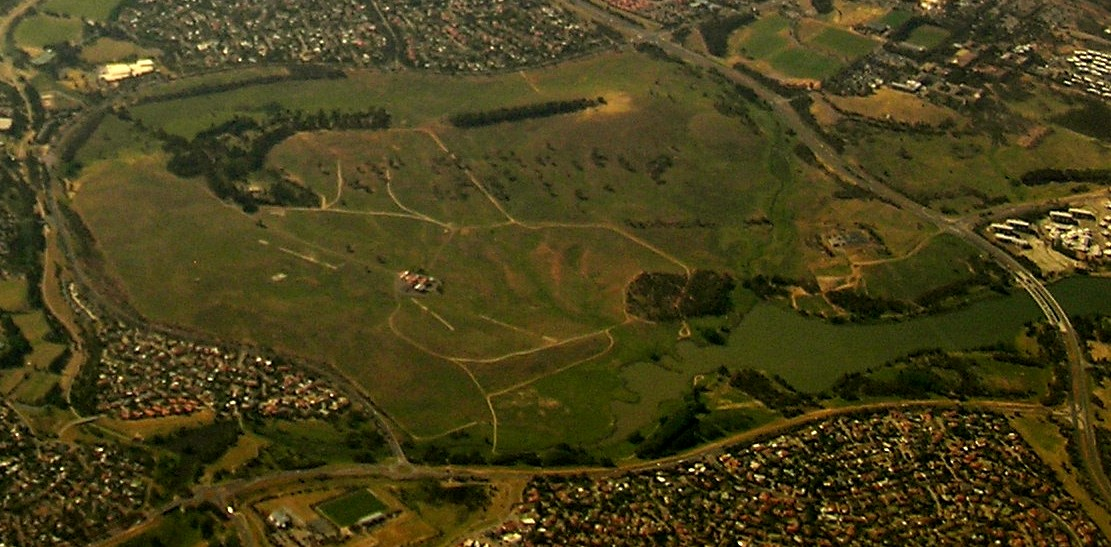
Aerial view of Lawson from the west

The rocks in Lawson are from Ordovician and Silurian ages. The Ordovician age greywacke from the Pittman Formation is in the far south and east of Lawson, including a band of black Acton Shale. Greywacke is formed by underwater landslides of mud settling out on the ocean floor. The black shale was formed in the deep ocean when the water had no oxygen. Then in the north west there are late Silurian sedimentary rocks. From the centre of Lawson there is mudstone, State Circle Shale, and then Black Mountain Sandstone that contains mica lenses of shale. On the west side of lake Ginninderra there is calcareous shale from the Canberra Formation in the north, Glebe Farm Adamellite intrusion in the centre and a porphyry of Green-grey Dacitic intrusive containing large white Feldspar crystals in the south. A long fault that follows the east bank of the Lake Ginninderra, and Ginninderra Creek passes through Lawson in the north north west direction. It is likely that this fault has determined the location of the creek. The late Silurian sediments are to the east of the fault.
