= McKellar, Australian Capital Territory =

McKellar
- Suburb
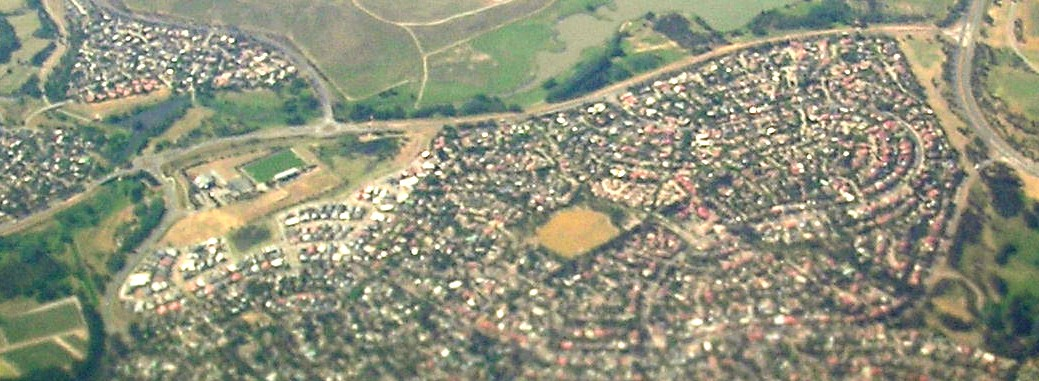
- Aerial view of McKellar from the west

- Coordinates: 35°13′03″S 149°04′34″E
- Country: Australia
- State: Australian Capital Territory
- City: Canberra
- District: Belconnen
- Location: 12 km (7.5 mi) NW of Canberra CBD; 31 km (19 mi) WNW of Queanbeyan; 94 km (58 mi) SW of Goulburn; 291 km (181 mi) SW of Sydney
- Established: 1983

Government
  - Territory electorate: Ginninderra
  - Federal division: Fenner

Area
  - Total: 1.4 km^{2} (0.54 sq mi)
- Elevation: 603 m (1,978 ft)

Population
  - Total: 2,740 (SAL 2021)
- Postcode: 2617
Suburbs around McKellar
| | | Giralang |
| Evatt | McKellar | Lawson |
| | Belconnen |

McKellar (/ˈməkɛlər/) is a residential suburb in the Belconnen district of Canberra, located within the Australian Capital Territory, Australia. The suburb is named after Colin McKellar, who served as the Minister for Repatriation from 1964 until 1970. The suburb name was gazetted on 15 January 1974. The streets of McKellar are named for journalists with the main street of the suburb called Dumas Street. McKellar is bounded by Ginninderra Drive, William Webb Drive, Owen Dixon Drive, and Gundaroo Drive.

== Suburb features ==
McKellar features the McKellar Oval in the centre of the suburb, known as William Palmer Park, and has panoramic prospect from Mount Ainslie to Black Mountain and Mount Majura.

A small football stadium known as McKellar Park, and club are in the north east of the suburb. The McKellar shopping centre closed in 2012 and was later demolished, with only a single smaller commercial building remaining. McKellar Preschool closed in 2006, with the building later reopened as a privately run childcare centre.

== Transport ==
McKellar is serviced by the ACTION bus network along Dumas Street and William Webb Drive. Route 43 travels along Dumas Street to Belconnen Interchange while route 24 travels along William Webb Drive to Belconnen Interchange.

== Governance ==
For the purposes of Australian federal elections for the House of Representatives, McKellar is in the Division of Fenner.

For the purposes of Australian Capital Territory elections for the ACT Legislative Assembly, McKellar is in the Ginninderra electorate.

== Geology ==
A porphyry of Green-grey Dacitic intrusive containing large white feldspar crystals is found in most of McKellar. This is intruded by a band of Glebe Farm Adamellite through the south.
