= North Canberra Hospital =

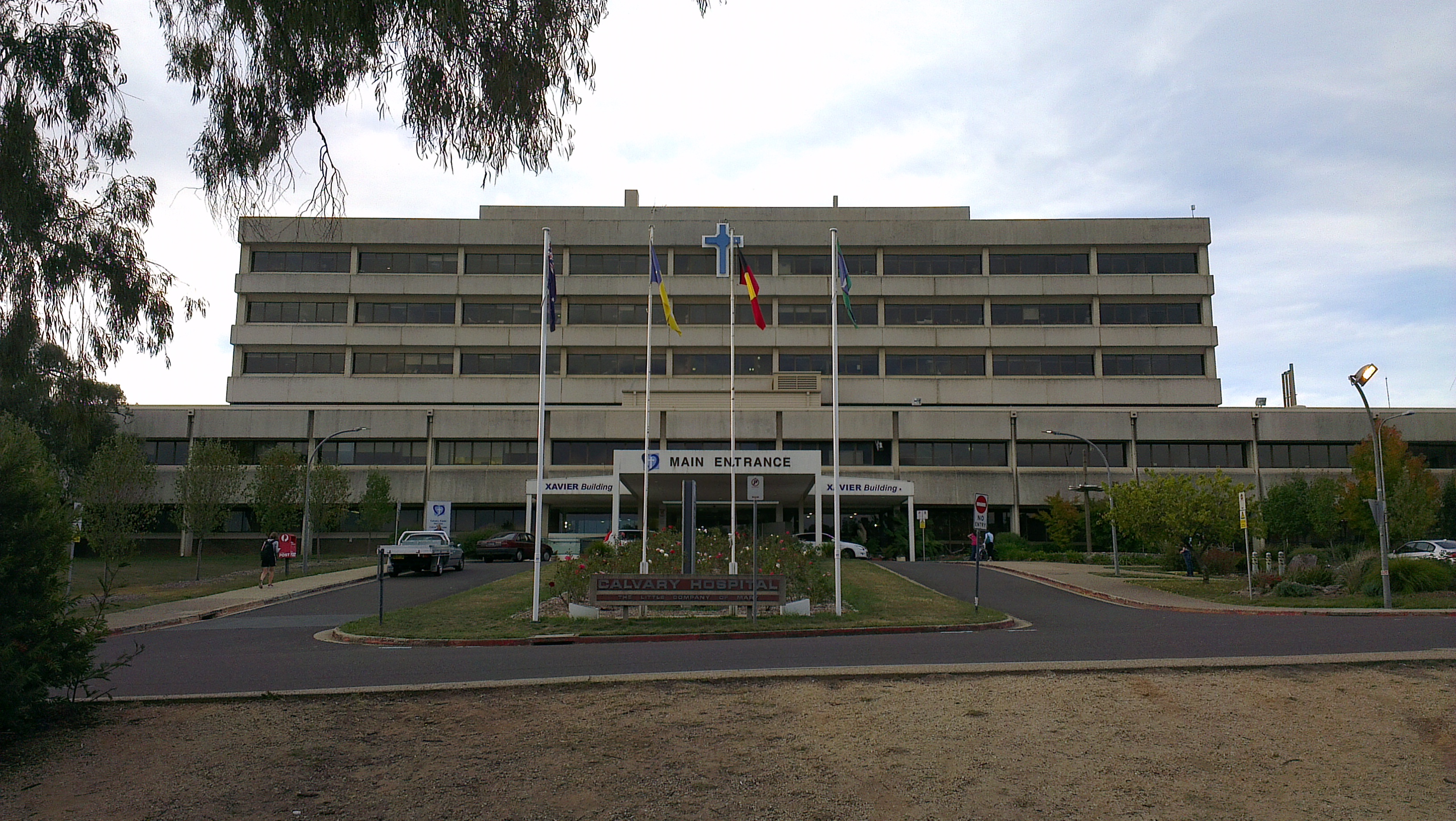
- Main entrance of North Canberra Hospital

Geography
- Location: Mary Potter Circuit, Bruce, Canberra, ACT, Australia
- Coordinates: 35°15′12″S 149°05′24″E

Organisation
- Care system: Non-profit
- Type: Teaching, District General
- Affiliated university: Australian National University, Australian Catholic University, University of Canberra

Services
- Emergency department: Yes
- Beds: 250

History
- Founded: 1979

Links
- Website: canberrahealthservices.act.gov.au
- Lists: Hospitals in Australia

North Canberra Hospital, formerly the Calvary Public Hospital Bruce, is an Australian public hospital located in Bruce, Australian Capital Territory, serving the northern suburbs of Canberra. It is classified as a secondary care facility. The hospital is operated by Canberra Health Services, the health service of the ACT Government. It was established as the Calvary Public Hospital Bruce in 1979 and was operated by a division of the Little Company of Mary Health Care (LCMHC), Calvary Health Care ACT, on behalf of the ACT Government. In 2023, the ACT Government compulsorily acquired the hospital with a view to building a new hospital on the site. It is a teaching hospital affiliated with the Australian Catholic University, the Australian National University and the University of Canberra. Calvary Bruce Private Hospital, which includes the Hyson Green Mental Health Clinic, is co-located on the site and continues to operate under Calvary Health Care. The private facilities share some services and infrastructure with North Canberra Hospital.

== History ==
An agreement between the Commonwealth Government and Corporation of the Little Company of Mary was reached on 22 October 1971 to construct and operate a public hospital providing up to 300 beds to service the Inner North and Belconnen districts in Canberra, to be located on a site in the new suburb of Bruce. The new hospital commenced operations in May 1979, with the ownership and operation of the hospital remaining largely unchanged following the transition to self-government of the territory in 1988.

In 2007/2008 the hospital conducted a pilot refugee mentoring program. This community program is designed to provide refugees to Australia with work experience and career information and promotes cross cultural understanding. The program was launched in June 2008 and is funded through LCMHC's national community benefit program. As of 2025, Calvary continues to offer a refugee mentoring program in Canberra, providing work experience and career exposure for people from refugee and asylum seeker backgrounds across its private hospitals, aged care and home care services.

In 2009, amid concerns regarding the ACT hospital system reaching capacity, the territory government investigated acquiring the hospital to bring it under full government ownership and control. The move was prompted by government concerns about control of its assets should it commit to investing in upgrading the existing hospital. However, following public consultation and extensive negotiations with Little Company of Mary Health Care in 2010, the proposal failed to eventuate and the existing operational agreements were maintained. The government projects medium-term demand for another 400 hospital beds across Canberra and are now pursuing options to meet this, including the construction of a new public hospital to be built in the northern suburbs, with some services separated and others shared with Calvary.

In May 2014, the ACT Government announced $19 million funding for the construction of a 700 space multi-story car park to relieve demand for parking at the hospital, as well as upgrading the hospital's electrical sub-station to allow for expansion of clinical services offered on the campus.

Calvary Public Hospital Bruce was among the earliest institutions in Australia to undertake sentinel lymph node biopsy procedures under the guidance of prominent local breast cancer surgeon John Buckingham.

=== Reproductive healthcare controversy and government acquisition ===
Since initial discussions by the ACT Government regarding a take over the hospital in 2009, public and political debate has centred on the hospital's policies regarding many aspects of reproductive medicine. As early as 2007, a dispute between the Canberra Fertility Centre and Little Company of Mary Health Care received national media coverage over restrictions placed on In vitro fertilisation (IVF) procedures at Calvary Public Hospital Bruce and the Calvary John James Private Hospital. During 2019, complaints to the ACT Human Rights Commission alleged the hospital was limiting the information and advice it provided to women on both abortion as well as options for contraception. As the public hospital for many of Canberra's northern districts, the commission was concerned that the hospital's guidance by Catholic doctrines on these issues was unfairly disadvantaging those on lower incomes who could not afford or easily travel to alternative health services.

During 2022, a Legislative Assembly committee launched an inquiry into abortion and reproductive rights in Canberra, partially in response to outrage surrounding the repeal of Roe v. Wade by the Supreme Court of the United States. The committee handed down its report in April 2023, which identified that Calvary Public Hospital Bruce's "religious ethos" was a barrier to accessing certain treatments and procedures that should be considered basic human rights. Central to this finding was the submission from a woman suffering from a natural miscarriage who claimed she was denied a dilation and curettage procedure at the hospital as this treatment can also be used for abortions. The hospital rejected this claim, saying it could not confirm that the woman presented for treatment, and that the government report misrepresented gynecological services and advice it provided. It sought to have aspects of the report's findings redacted.

Following the release of the inquiry's recommendations, in May 2023 the ACT Government announced that it planned to take over the hospital land and assets and to redevelop the site as part of a $1 billion healthcare campus for Canberra's northern districts. The planned acquisition followed attempts to purchase the hospital from Little Company of Mary Health Care during 2010, when a deal was not possible as approval from the Vatican was expected to take several years. Archbishop of Sydney, Anthony Fisher, condemned the proposal as an abuse of property rights and religious freedom. He said that acquiring the hospital would force an "anti-life agenda" by performing abortions and assisted suicide. Fisher also criticised the government's management of Canberra Hospital as evidence of previous incompetence in delivering health services. While the government announced that all staff would be retained as part of the takeover, senior doctors on staff at the hospital and the ACT branch of the Australian Medical Association were also critical of the decision, upset about a lack of consultation by the government. These groups called on the enabling legislation to be delayed, providing certainty and stability for medical staff and guarantees that services would not suffer as a result. The opposition Canberra Liberals also criticised the acquisition.

On 11 May 2023, the Health Infrastructure Enabling Bill 2023 was introduced to the ACT Legislative Assembly, proposing to remove the public hospital land from the existing Crown lease and terminate the Calvary Network Agreement "on just terms", with provision for compensation. This legislation was passed by the Assembly on 31 May to assume control of the hospital on 3 July 2023.

This prompted an immediate legal challenge by Calvary Health Care, which said that the legislation was invalid and did not provide compensation on just terms. Federal Opposition leader Peter Dutton also called on the Prime Minister of Australia, Anthony Albanese, to intervene by overriding the ACT Government to stop the takeover. On 9 June 2023, the Supreme Court of the Australian Capital Territory dismissed Calvary Health Care's application for an injunction to stop the acquisition.

Workers began removing a large exterior cross and other Catholic iconography from the site on 2 July. The operations of Calvary Public Hospital Bruce were transited to Canberra Health Services the next day, and the facility is now known as North Canberra Hospital.

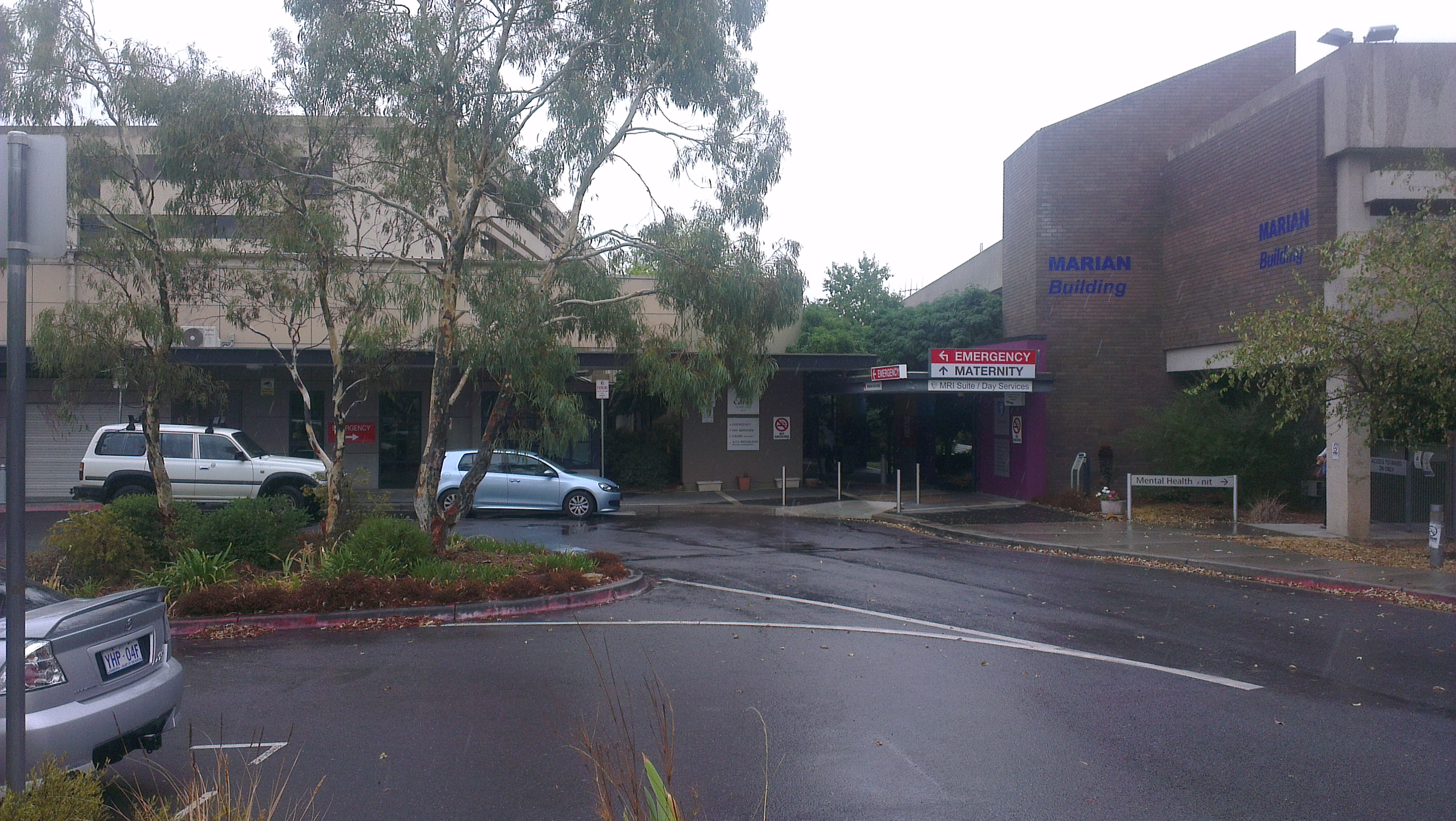
Calvary Emergency Department

== Services ==
Calvary Public Hospital Bruce provided services including:

- Emergency department
- Intensive care unit
- Reconstructive surgery
- General medicine and surgery
- Mental health
- Obstetrics, gynecology and neonatology
- Rheumatology
- Cardiology
- Endocrinology
- Gastroenterology and respiratory care
- Urology
- Neurology
- Ophthalmology
- Orthopaedics
- Oncology and breast cancer nursing services
- Pastoral care

The Bruce campus is also home to a variety of outpatient and Allied Health services which operate in conjunction with the hospital. Due to moral concerns of the Catholic Church, the agreement under which the hospital operated allowed that certain procedures including IVF and induced abortions not be performed at Calvary Public Hospital Bruce.

== Statistics ==
In the 2021-22 financial year, Calvary Public Hospital Bruce conducted 6,295 elective surgeries and handled 56,755 Emergency Department presentations. Elective surgery waiting times were similar or better than national averages of comparable hospitals, while Emergency department wait times were longer, with only 39% of urgent presentations being treated within clinically recommended timeframes, compared to an average of 51% at comparable hospitals per data available on the Australian Institute of Health and Welfare's MyHospitals website.

== See also ==
- List of hospitals in Australia
- List of hospitals in the Australian Capital Territory
