= Kaleen, Australian Capital Territory =

Kaleen
- Suburb
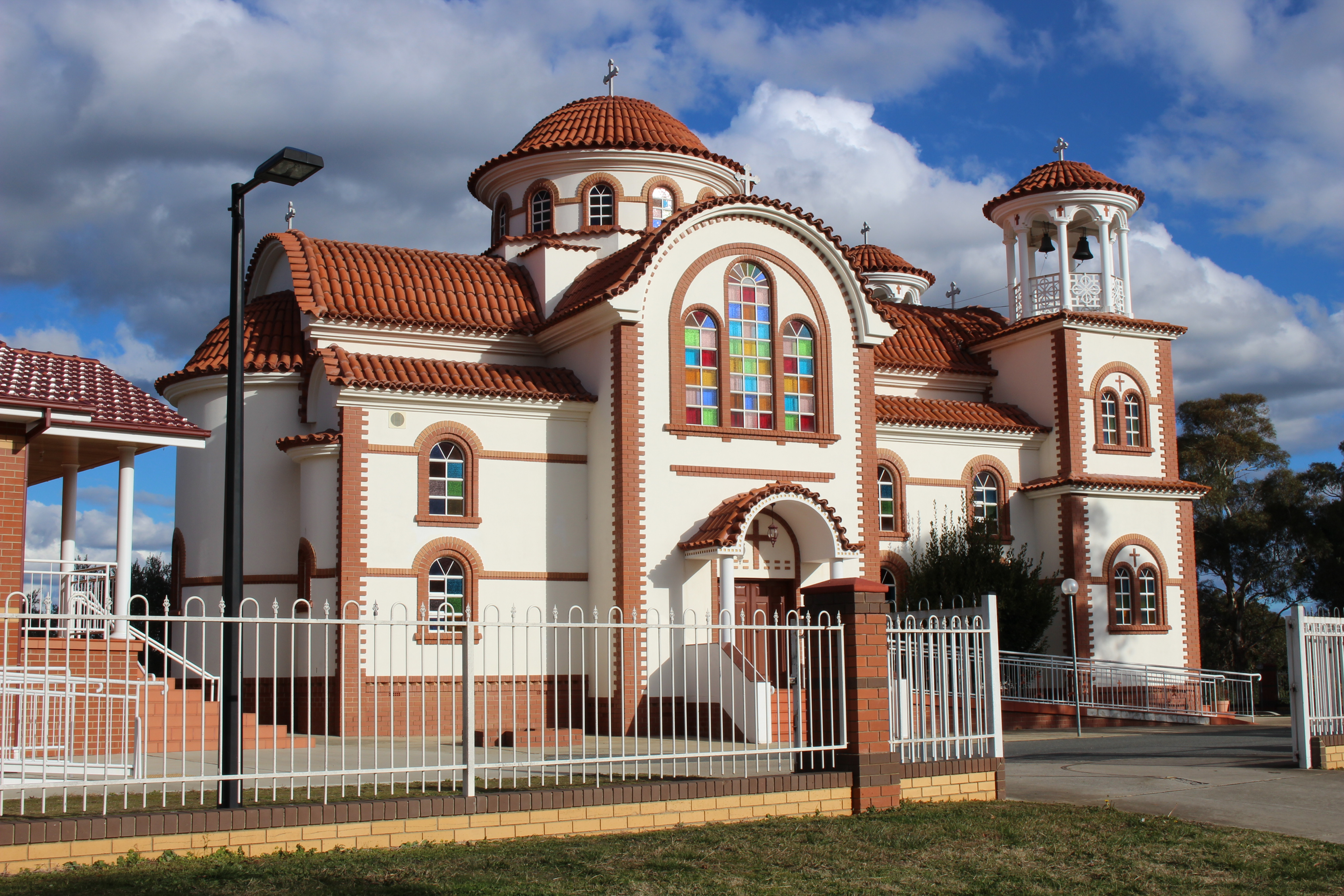
- All Saints Greek Orthodox Church

- Coordinates: 35°13′13″S 149°06′09″E
- Country: Australia
- State: Australian Capital Territory
- City: Canberra
- District: Belconnen
- Location: 9 km (5.6 mi) NNW of Canberra CBD; 24 km (15 mi) NW of Queanbeyan; 90 km (56 mi) SW of Goulburn; 287 km (178 mi) SW of Sydney
- Established: 1974

Government
  - Territory electorate: Yerrabi
  - Federal division: Canberra

Area
  - Total: 6.0 km^{2} (2.3 sq mi)
- Elevation: 601 m (1,972 ft)

Population
  - Total: 7,672 (SAL 2021)
- Postcode: 2617
Suburbs around Kaleen
Giralang	Crace	Crace
Lawson	Kaleen	Lyneham
Belconnen	Bruce	Lyneham

Kaleen (/keɪˈliːn/ kay-LEEN or /kəˈliːn/ kə-LEEN) is a suburb in the Belconnen district of Canberra, located within the Australian Capital Territory, Australia. The suburb's name is derived from the word for 'water' in the language of the Wiradjuri Aboriginal tribe of the central west region of New South Wales. Kaleen was gazetted as a suburb on 15 January 1974. The streets are named after Australian rivers.

The suburb is next to Lyneham, Giralang, Lawson and Bruce. It is bordered by Baldwin Drive and Ginninderra Drive. It has several ovals; Kaleen North oval, Kaleen Enclosed oval, Kaleen District Playing Fields and Kaleen South oval, which play host to a number of sports, including soccer, cricket, and rugby. Unusually for a suburb, there are two small shopping centres in Kaleen, both bordering the main street of Maribyrnong Avenue. There is also a larger shopping centre near Kaleen's border with Giralang on Georgina Crescent.

The 2XX transmitting station is also located in Kaleen, near the Barton Highway. On the east side of the suburb is the Lyneham Ridge eucalypt plantation and a horse holding paddock. Kaleen, like most of Canberra, is located on a network of well-maintained bicycle paths. The main track in Kaleen passes under Ginninderra Drive, and runs through the middle of the suburb in a generally north–south direction, exiting the other side to the neighbouring suburb of Giralang.

== Governance ==
For the purposes of Australian federal elections for the House of Representatives, Kaleen is in the Division of Canberra.

For the purposes of Australian Capital Territory elections for the ACT Legislative Assembly, Kaleen is in the Yerrabi electorate.

== Geology ==
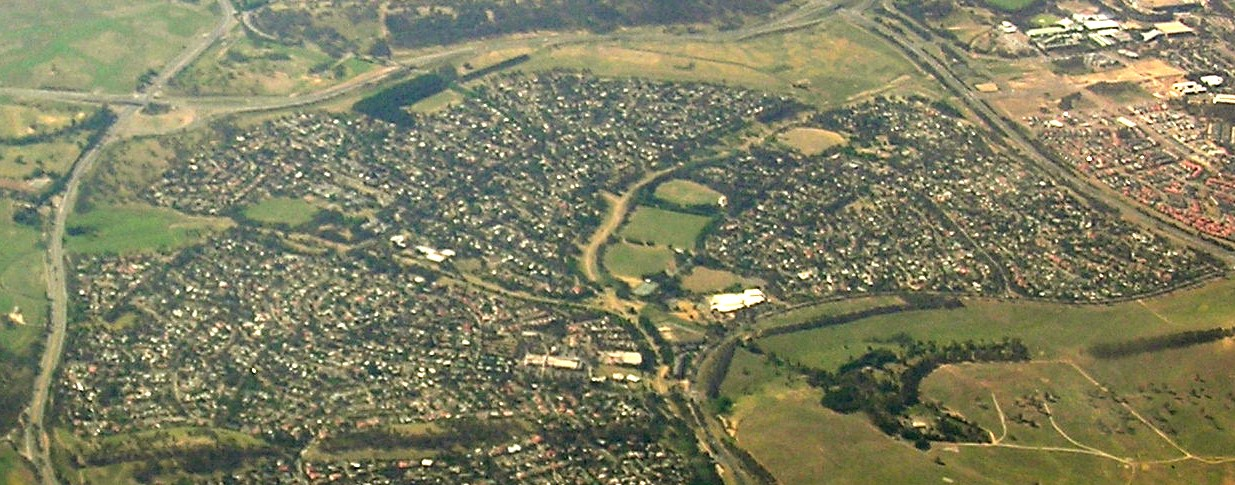
Aerial view of Kaleen, from the west.

Silurian age Canberra Formation calcareous shale is found in the east of Kaleen. Ordovician age Pittman Formation greywacke is in the west of the suburb. The Gungahlin Fault separates the two kinds of sediments, with the older greywacke being uplifted. Also to the east is the Winslade Fault roughly parallel and aligned north east.

== Churches and schools ==
Georgina Crescent is surrounded on three sides by several religious structures, including a Greek Orthodox church, a Coptic Orthodox church, and an Anglican church, St. Simon's Kaleen. St. Michael's Catholic Church and school are located nearby in Tyrrell Circuit. The suburb also has two government-run primary schools: Maribyrnong Primary School (located in Alberga Street, Kaleen) and Kaleen Primary School. Kaleen High School is located off Baldwin drive.

- All Saints (Old Calendar) Greek Orthodox Church, Canberra.
- St Mark Coptic Orthodox Church, Canberra – Australia
- St Simon’s Kaleen-Giralang-Lawson, Diocese of Canberra & Goulburn, Anglican Church of Australia

== Notable residents ==
- Brad Ilott - Australian cricketer and journalist
- Pigsy Deen
