= Bruce, Australian Capital Territory =

Bruce
- Suburb
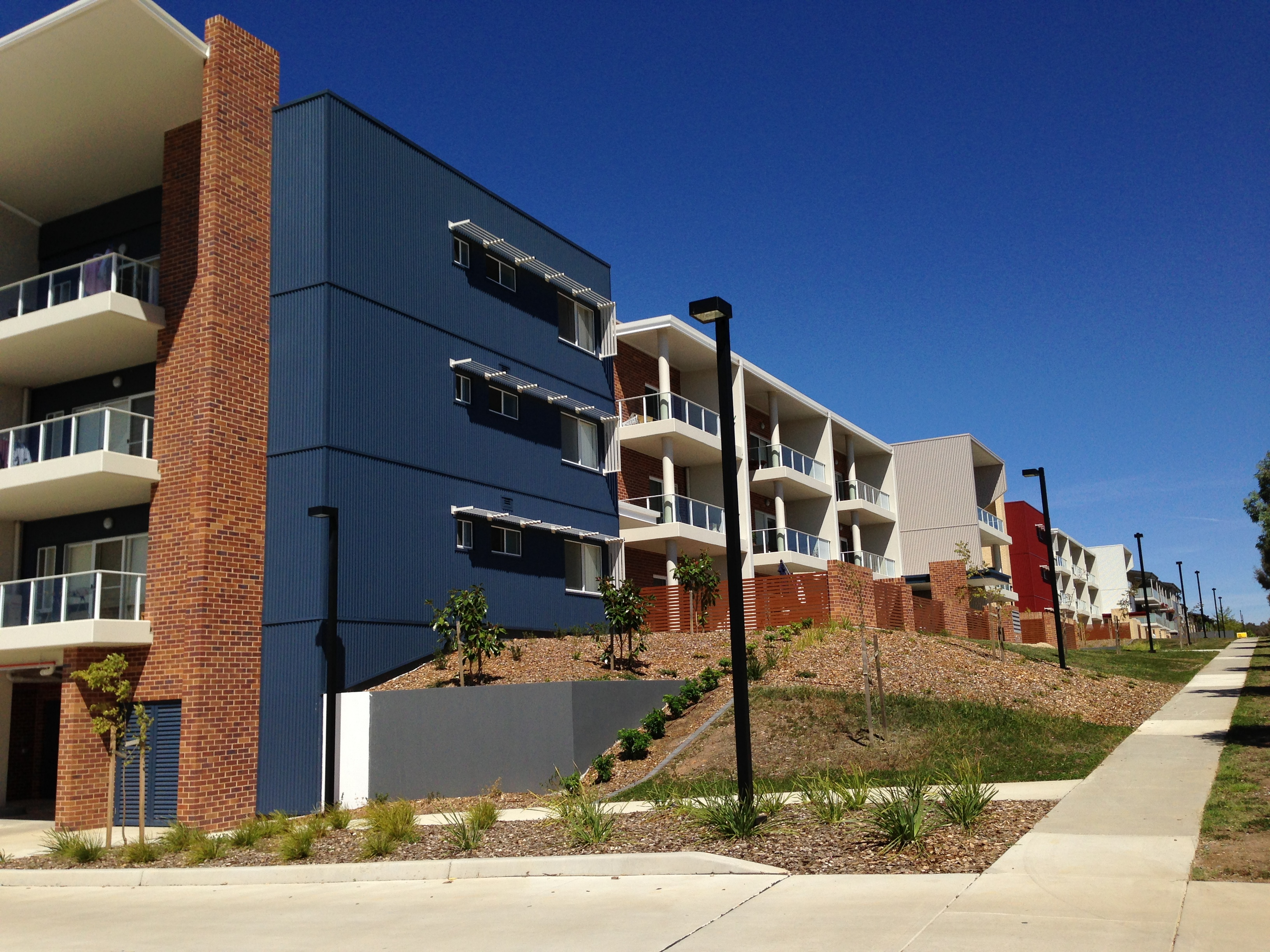
- Apartments on Thynne Street

- Coordinates: 35°14′31″S 149°04′37″E
- Country: Australia
- State: Australian Capital Territory
- City: Canberra
- District: Belconnen
- Location: 8 km (5.0 mi) WNW of Canberra CBD
- Established: 1968

Government
  - Territory electorate: Ginninderra
  - Federal division: Canberra

Area
  - Total: 5.8 km^{2} (2.2 sq mi)
- Elevation: 622 m (2,041 ft)

Population
  - Total: 7,520 (SAL 2021)
- Postcode: 2617
Suburbs around Bruce
Lawson	Kaleen	Lyneham
Belconnen	Bruce	O'Connor
Macquarie	Aranda	Black Mountain

Bruce is a suburb of the Belconnen district of Canberra, that is located within the Australian Capital Territory, Australia. The suburb was gazetted on 6 June 1968 and named for The Viscount Bruce of Melbourne (1883–1967), the eighth Prime Minister of Australia and the first Chancellor of the Australian National University.

== Demographics ==
At the 2021 census, Bruce had a population of 7,520 people, an increase from 6,390 in 2011 and 3,012 in 2001. 58.1% of people were born in Australia. The next most common countries of birth were China (6.2%), India (4.9%), Nepal (3.5%), England (2.1%) and Vietnam (1.6%). 62.7% of people spoke only English at home. Other languages spoken at home included Mandarin (6.7%), Nepali (3.5%), Cantonese (2.0%) and Vietnamese (1.8%). The most common responses for religion were No Religion (44.1%) and Catholic (15.3%). 20.7% of dwellings were separate houses, 45.8% were semi-detached, row or terrace houses or townhouses and 33.4% of were units or apartments.

== Places of interest ==
- Canberra Stadium is the home of the Canberra Raiders rugby league and Brumbies rugby union sides, and occasionally hosts national and international sporting events
- Canberra International Sports and Aquatic Centre
- The University of Canberra (UC) has an enrolment of over 10,000 students and is one of four major universities in Canberra
- The Australian Institute of Sport (AIS)
- Calvary Public Hospital
- Bruce Campus of the Canberra Institute of Technology
- Radford College

== Development ==
The Fern Hill section of the suburb was originally planned as a hub for information and communications technology businesses, with some low-rise office buildings being developed off Thynne Street, along with a small commercial centre including a cafe. However, the area has seen considerable residential development, with densities ranging from detached houses through to four-story apartment buildings, with commercial ground floor uses.

== Street names ==
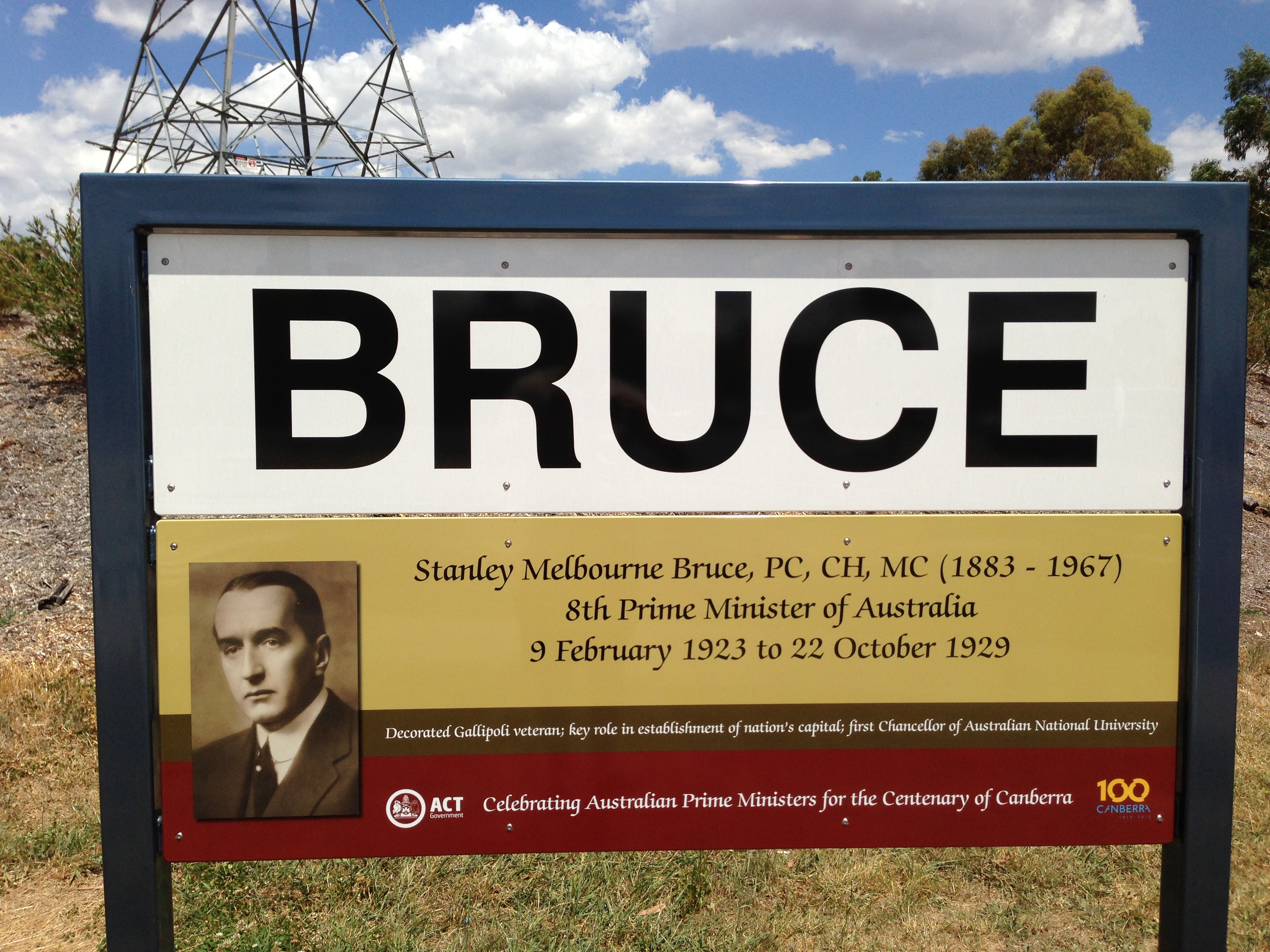
Suburb sign

Many of the streets in Bruce are named after people and places associated with Australian tertiary education, including:

- Agar Street – Wilfred Eade Agar, professor of zoology
- Battye Street – James Battye, chancellor
- Braybrooke Street – Ernest Kingston Braybrooke, professor of law
- College Street – Canberra College of Advanced Education, now the University of Canberra
- Crisp Circuit – Finlay Crisp, professor and Rhodes Scholar
- Funder Street – Kathleen Funder, writer, teacher, and educational psychologist
- Jaeger Circuit – John Conrad Jaeger, professor of geophysics and mathematics
- Leverrier Street – Frank Leverrier, vice-chancellor
- Mugglestone Place – Donald Mugglestone, professor of physics
- Purdie Street – Alexander Purdie, professor of geology
- Thynne Street – Andrew Joseph Thynne, government minister and university chancellor and vice-chancellor (who pronounced his name "thin")

== Transport ==
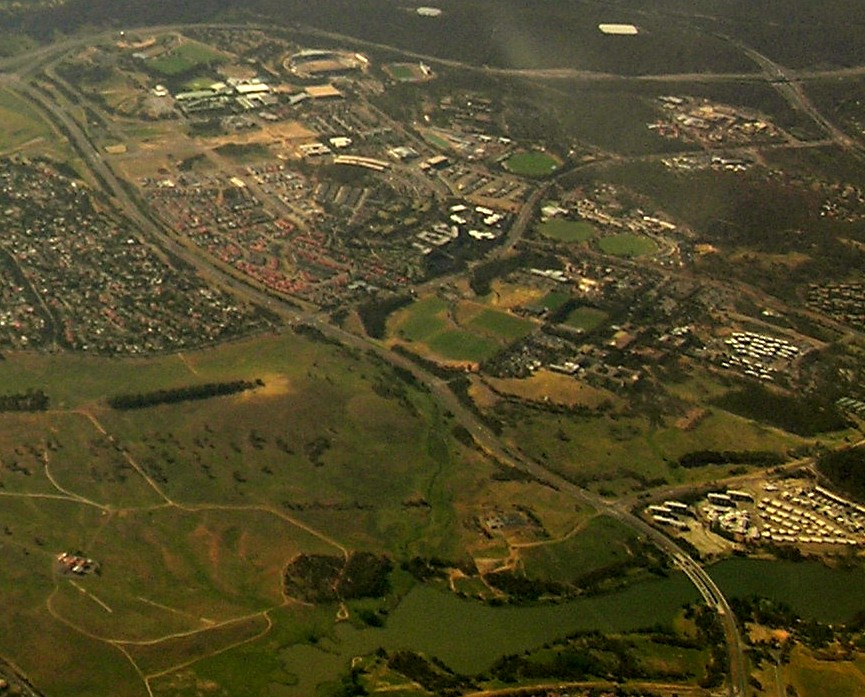
Aerial view from west

The suburb is also relatively well-served by public transport, with routes R2, R3 and R4 running through it via the Calvary Hospital, Radford College, and the University of Canberra. Route R9 connects the suburb to the Gungahlin light rail at Dickson. Additionally, a number of cycle routes provide links to the Inner North, Belconnen Town Centre, and Kaleen.

== Governance ==
For the purposes of Australian federal elections for the House of Representatives, Bruce is in the Division of Canberra.

For the purposes of Australian Capital Territory elections for the ACT Legislative Assembly, Bruce is in the Ginninderra electorate.

== Geology ==
Bruce is dominated by the greywacke of the Ordovician Pittman Formation. Bands of the black Acton Shale Member are found under the University of Canberra and the Calvary Hospital. Glebe Farm Adamellite is a coarse porphyritic micro adamellite of the Silurian age. It intrudes in the west north and southeast and southwest of University of Canberra. A triangle of Silurian age calcareous shale of the Canberra formation is in the north east of Bruce.

== Gallery ==
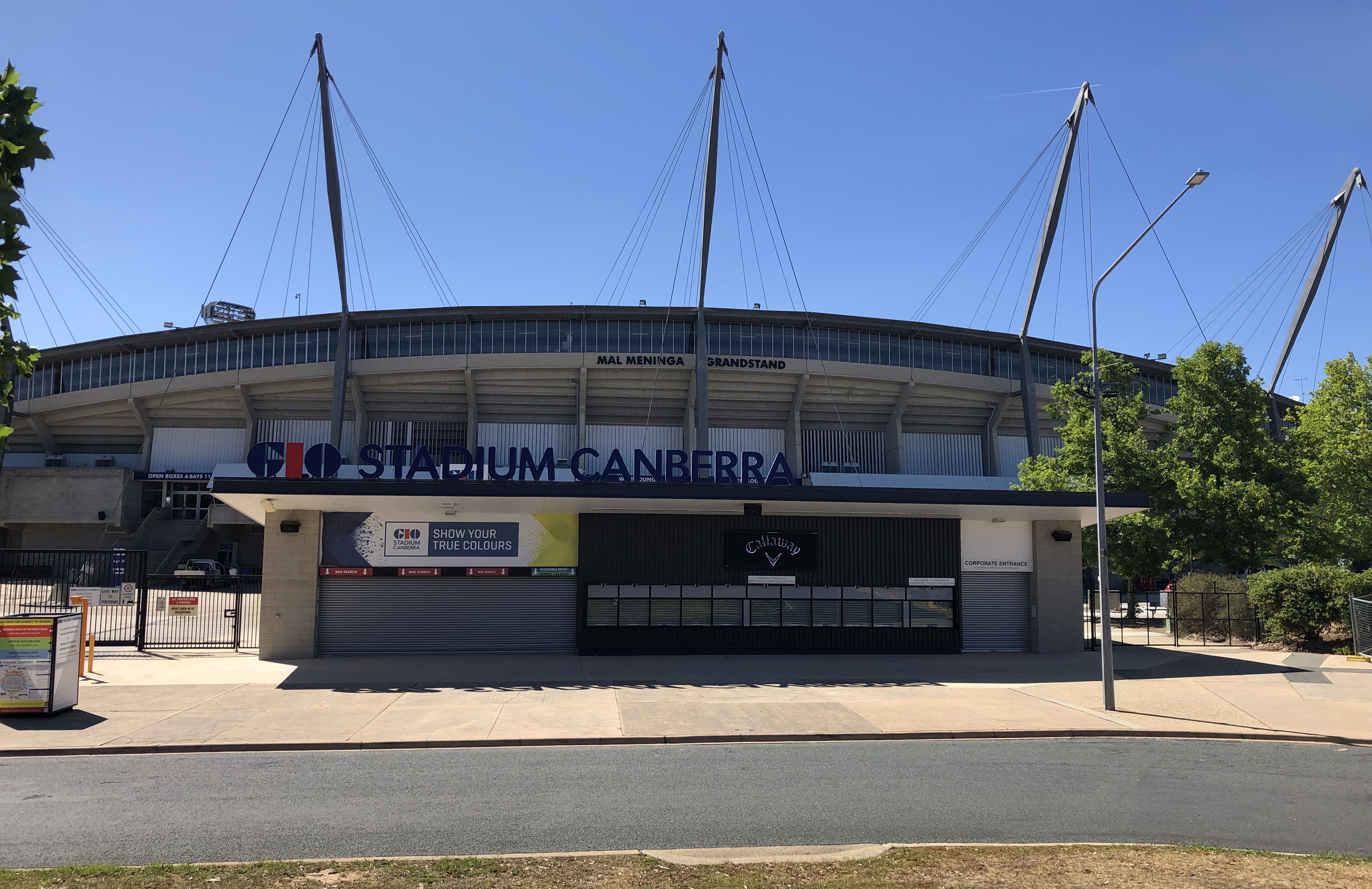
Canberra Stadium

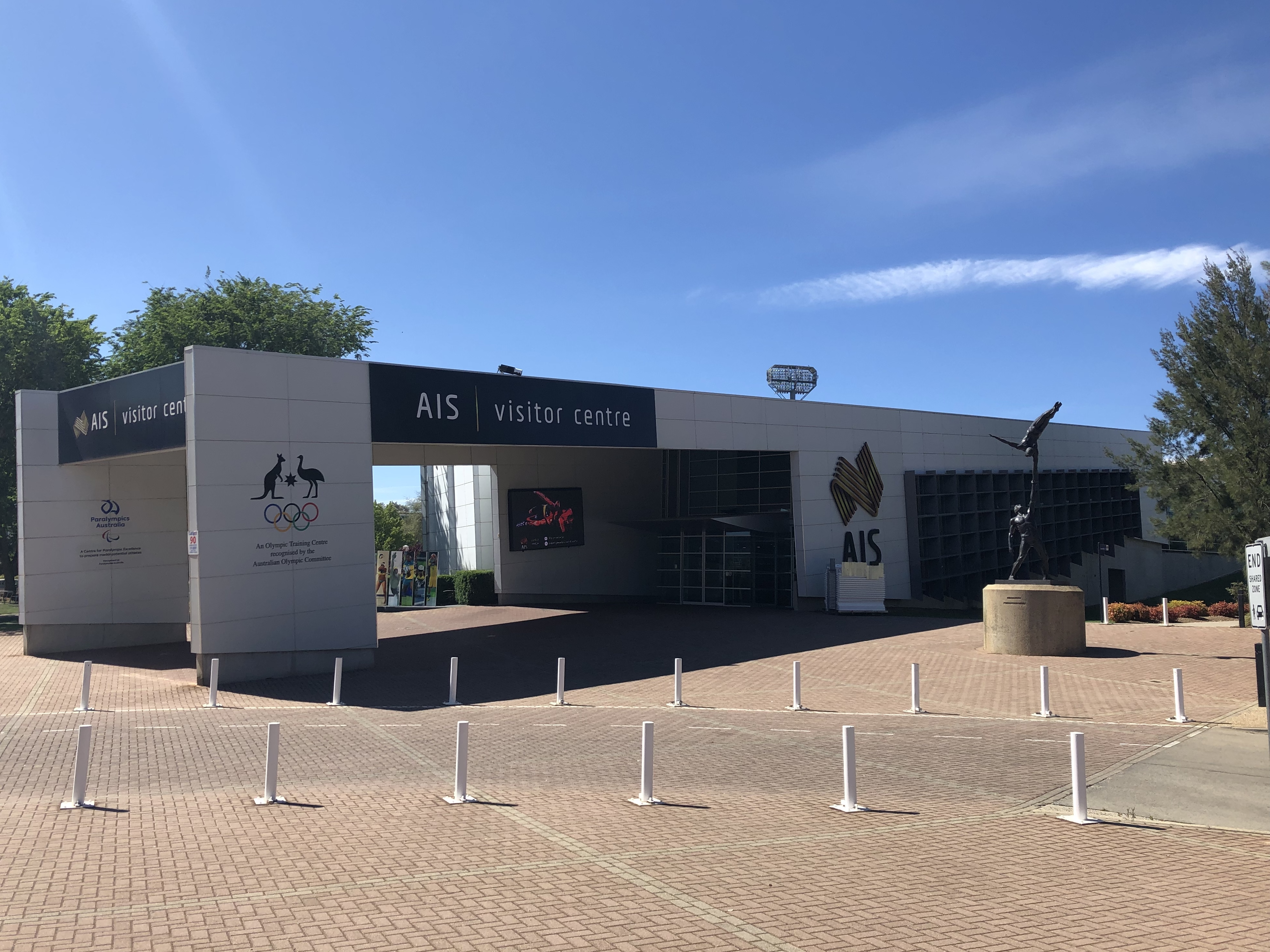
Australian Institute of Sport

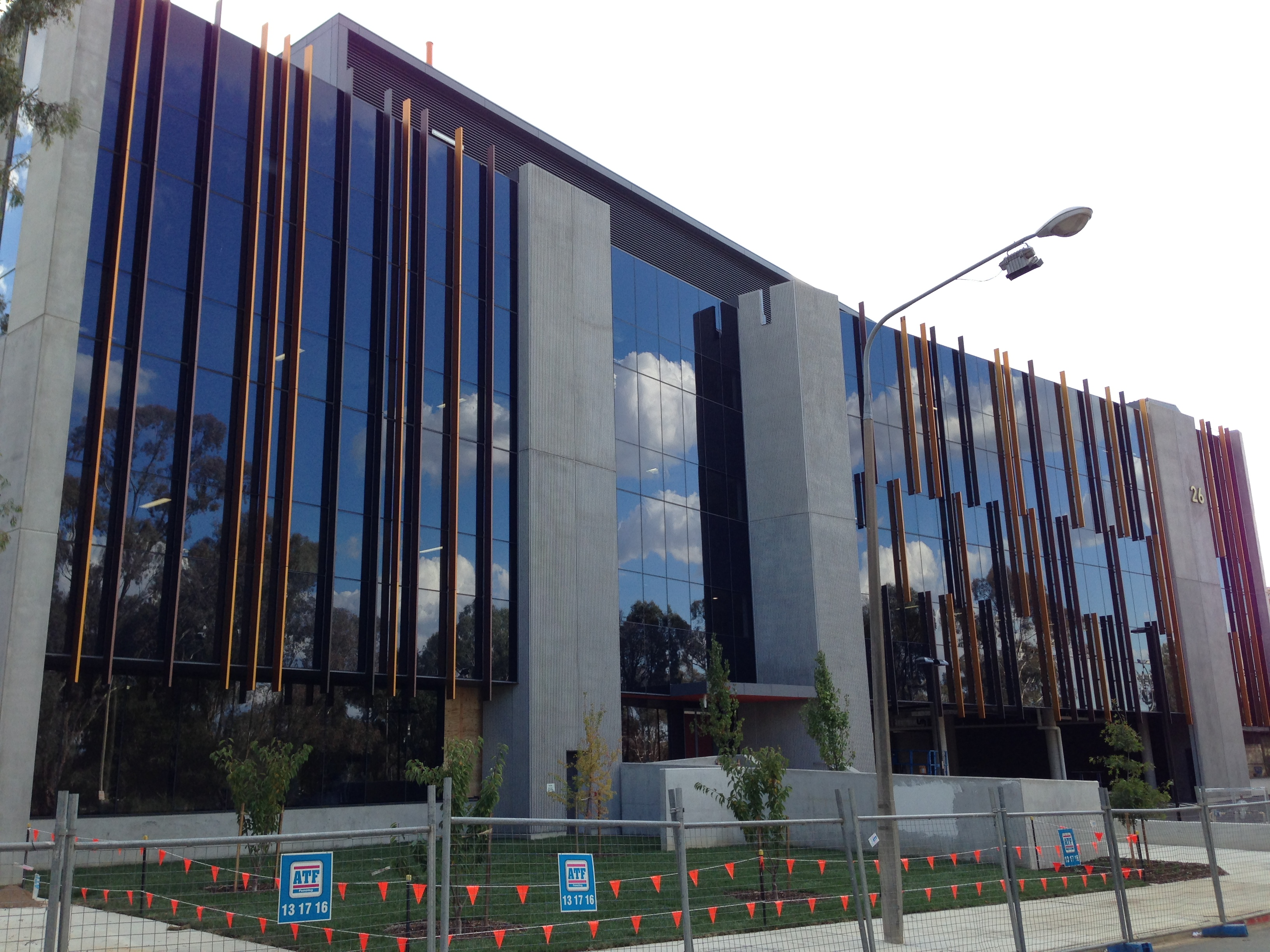
University of Canberra

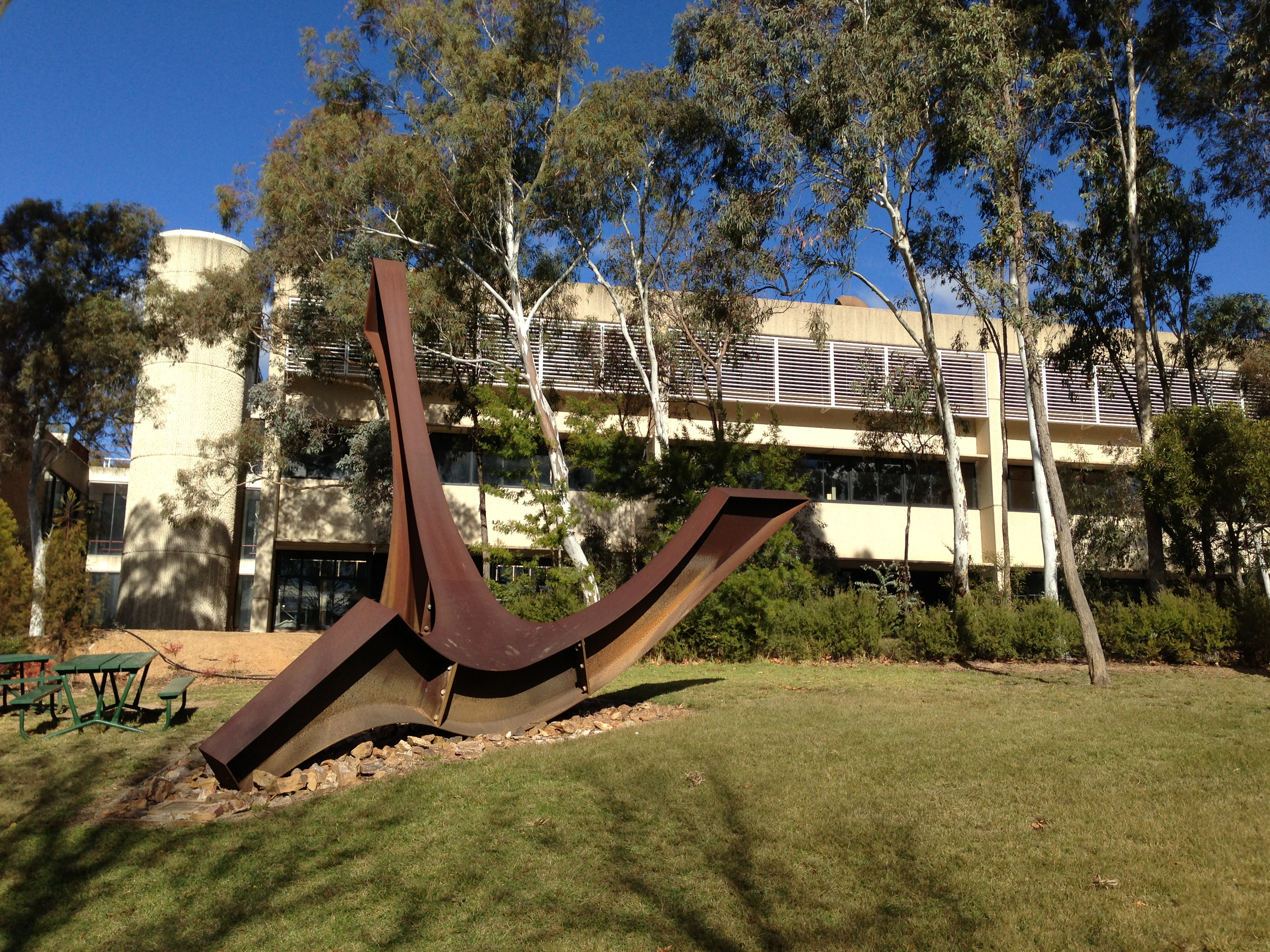
Canberra Institute of Technology

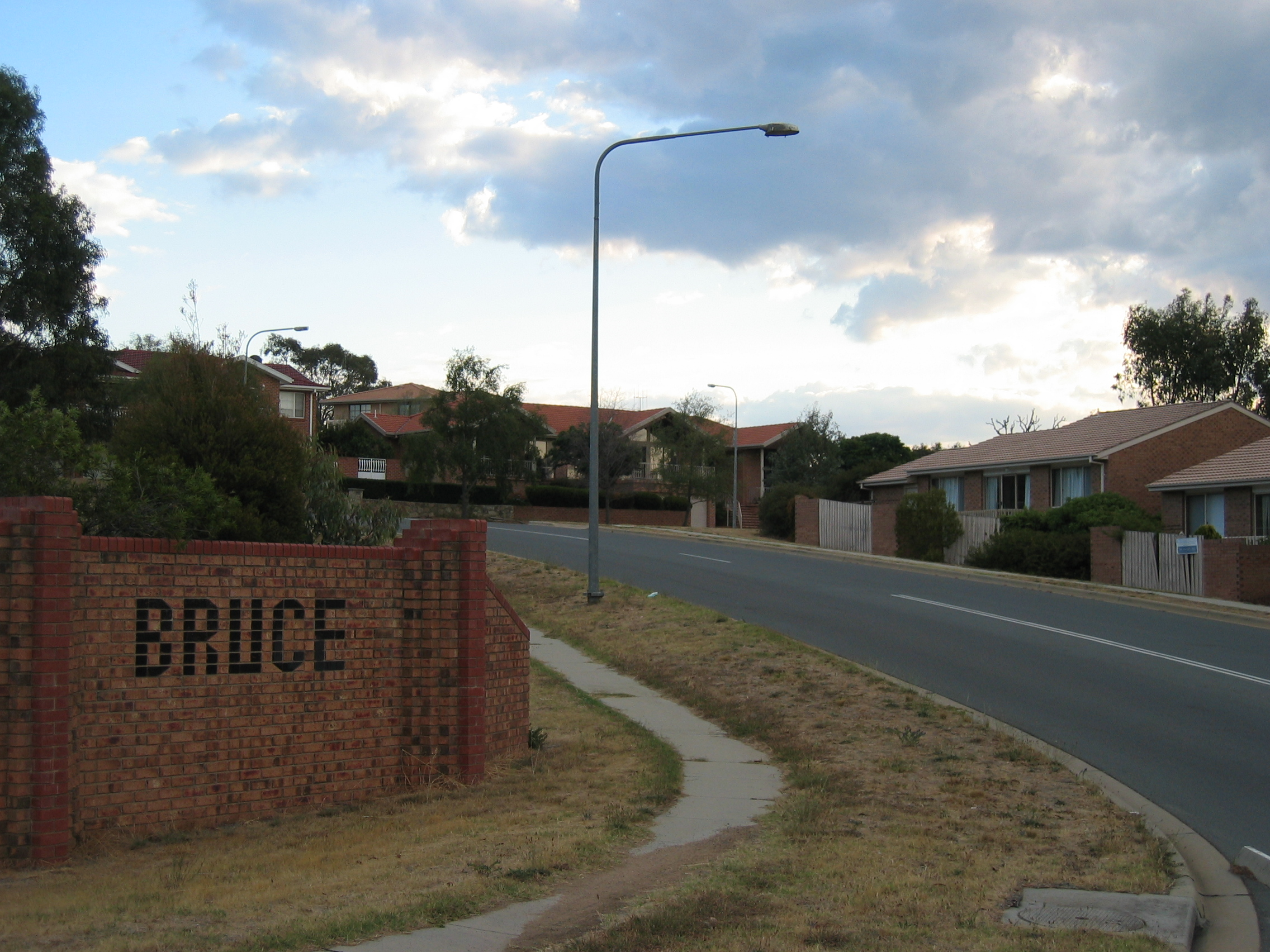
Residential area within Bruce

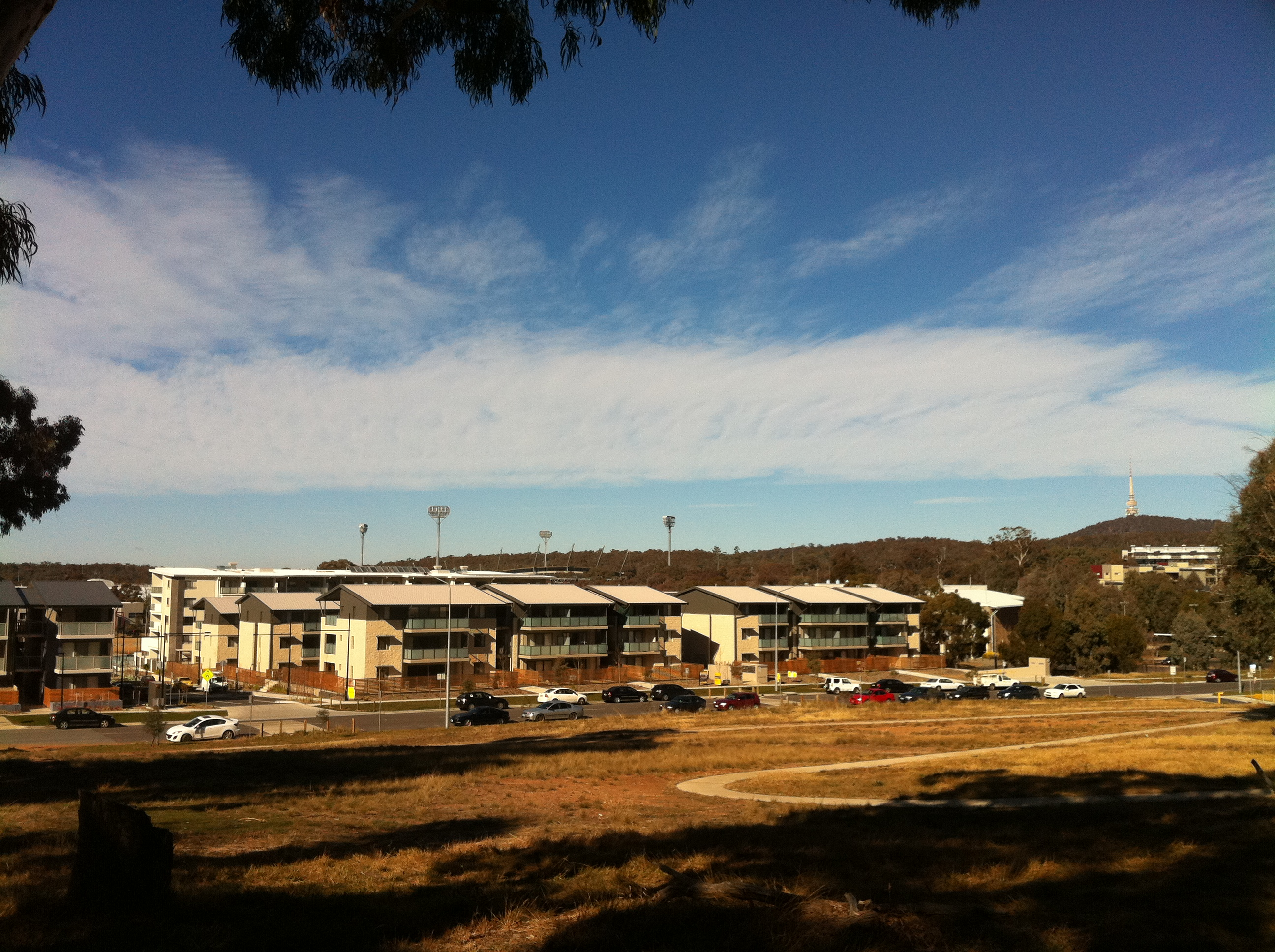
The Hub apartment complex

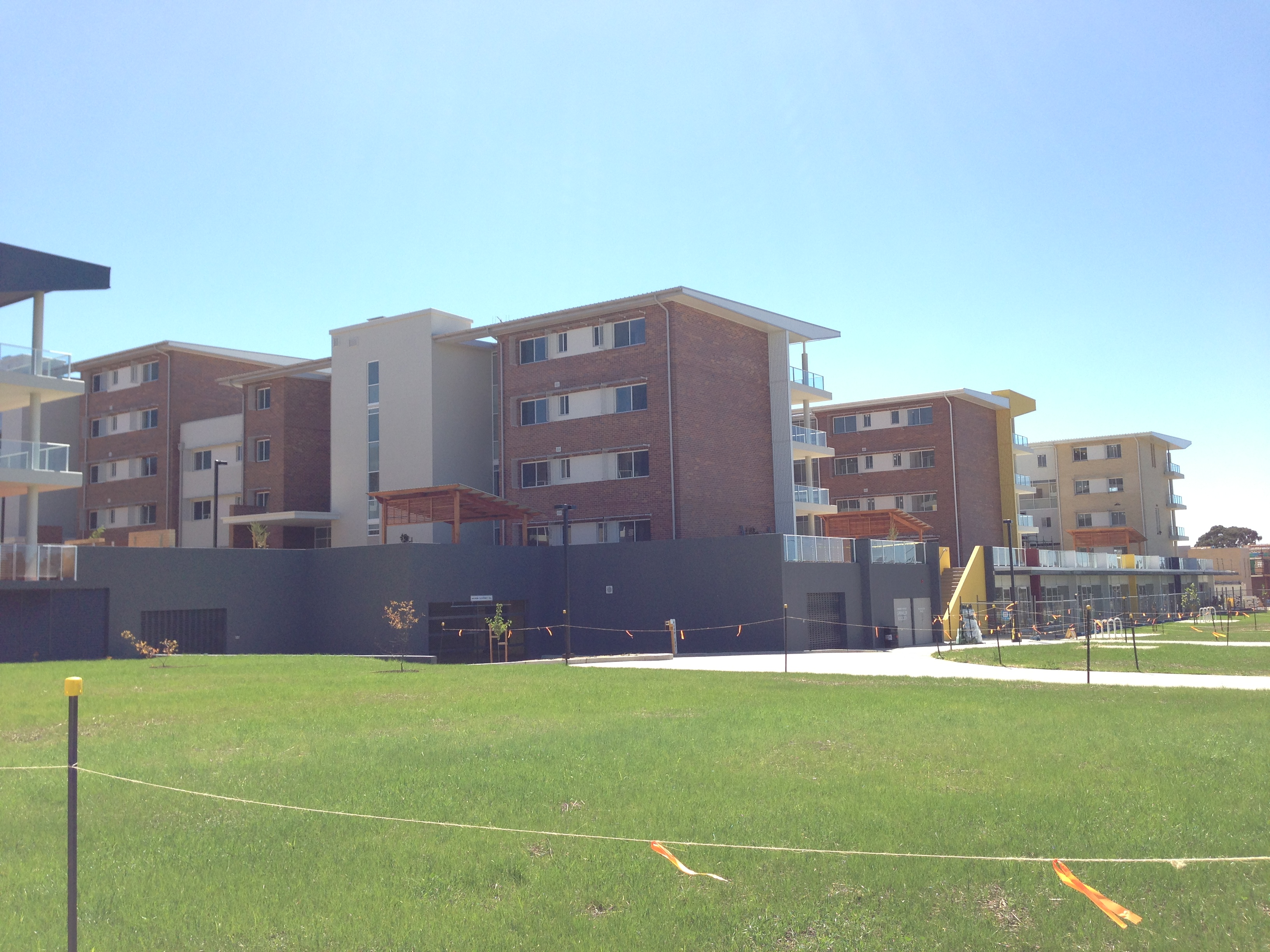
Apartments, Braybrooke Street
