= Australian Capital Territory Legislative Assembly =

Legislative Assembly
- 11th Assembly
- Coat of Arms of Canberra

- Legislative Assembly logo

Type
- Type: Unicameral

History
- Founded: 11 May 1989; 37 years ago
- Preceded by: House of Assembly

Leadership
- Speaker: Jeremy Hanson, Liberal since 2 December 2025
- Deputy Speaker: Andrew Braddock, Greens since 6 November 2024
- Manager of Government Business: Tara Cheyne, Labor since 7 November 2024
- Government whip: Caitlin Tough, Labor
- Chief Minister: Andrew Barr, Labor since 11 December 2014
- Leader of the Opposition: Mark Parton, Liberal since 10 November 2025

Structure
- Seats: 25
- Political groups: Government (10): Labor (10); Opposition (8): Liberal (8); Crossbench (7): Greens (4); Carrick (1); Independents (2)
- Length of term: 4 years

Elections
- Voting system: Hare–Clark electoral system
- First election: 4 March 1989
- Last election: 19 October 2024
- Next election: 21 October 2028

Meeting place
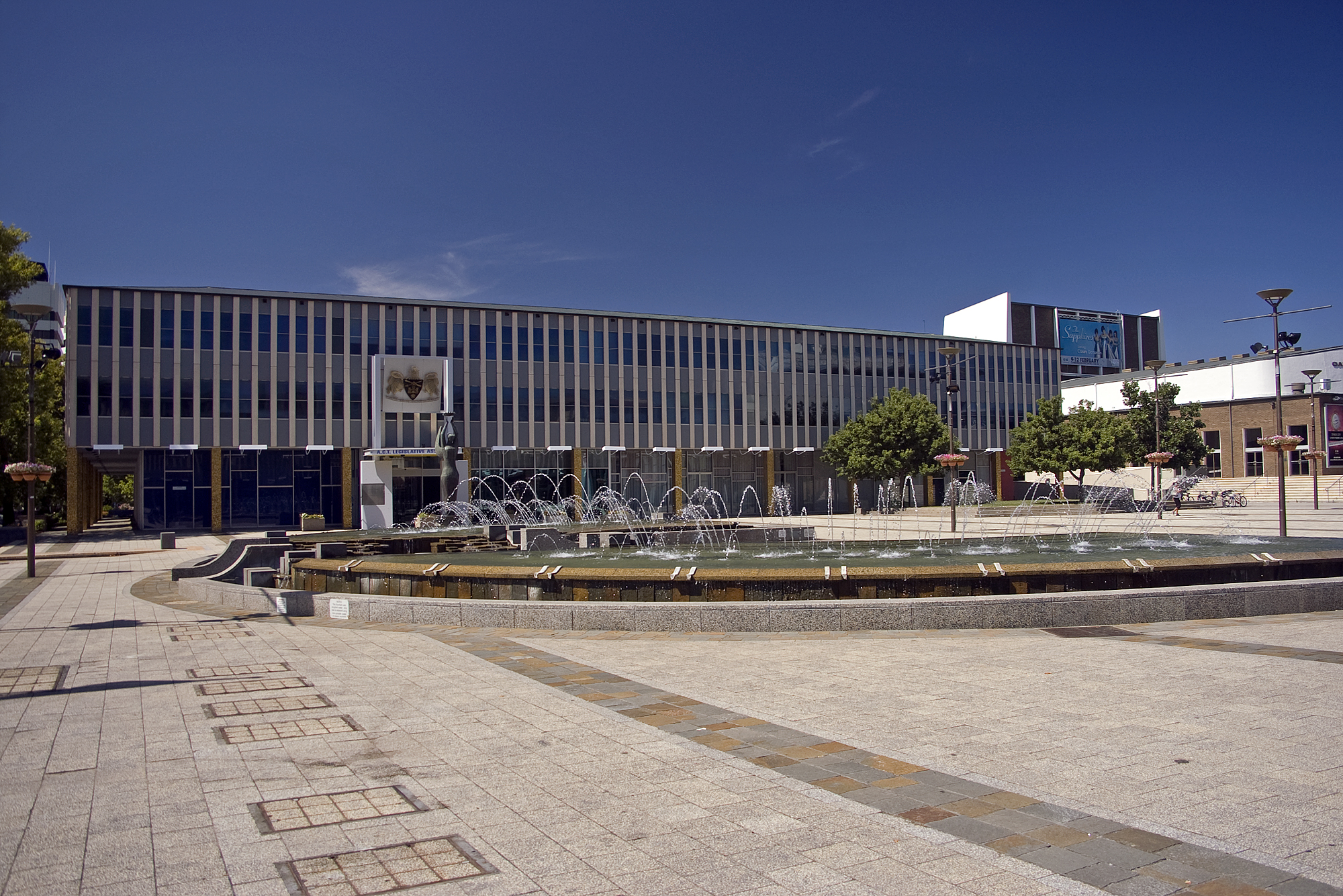
- Legislative Assembly Building, Canberra, Australian Capital Territory, Australia

Website
- parliament.act.gov.au

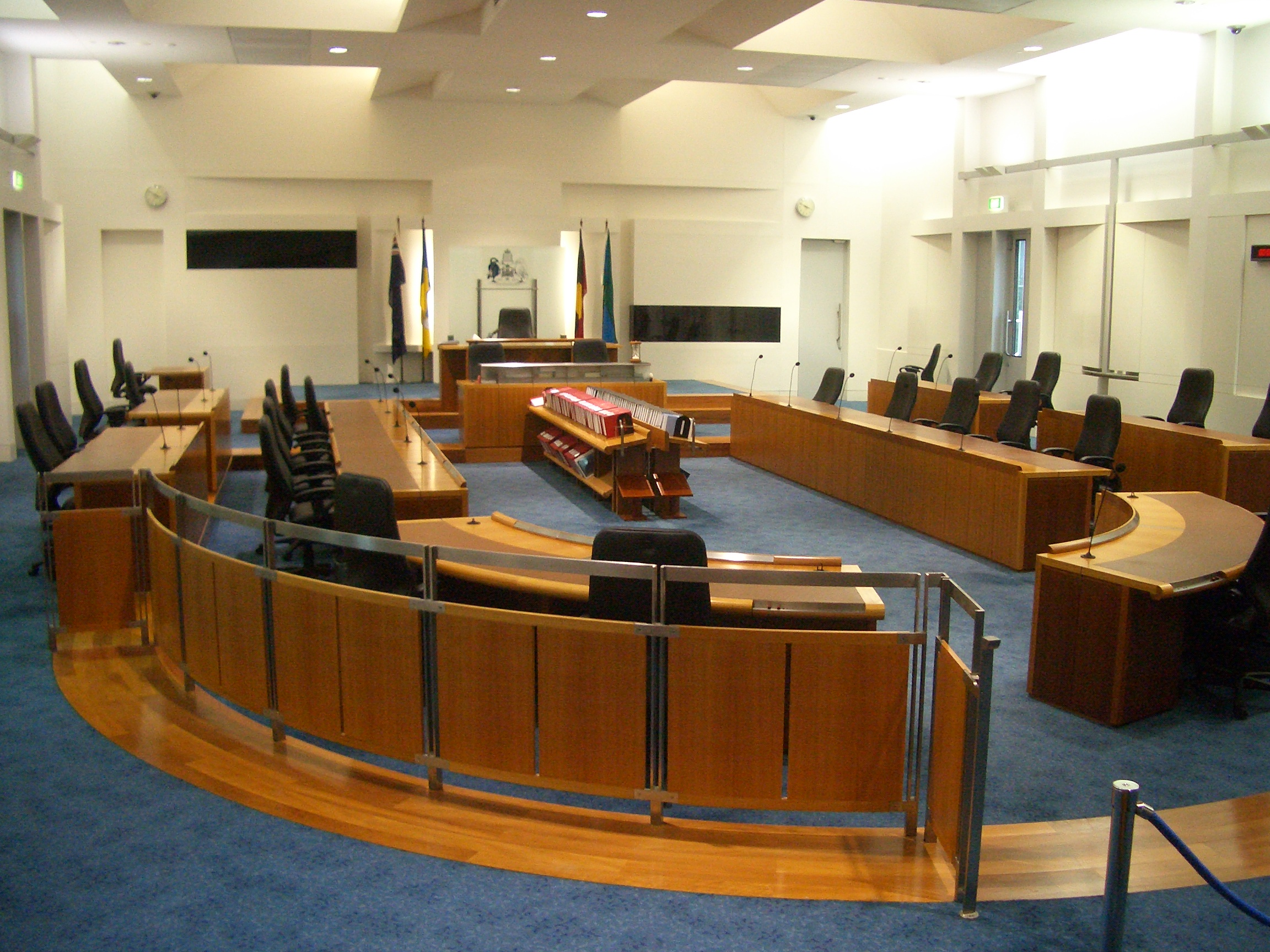
Chamber of the ACT Legislative Assembly

The Legislative Assembly for the Australian Capital Territory, known in short as the ACT Legislative Assembly, is the unicameral legislature of the Australian Capital Territory (ACT). It sits in the Legislative Assembly Building on Civic Square, close to the centre of the city of Canberra.

Unlike the legislatures of the states and the Northern Territory, the Assembly also has the functions of a local council; the city of Canberra has no other local government. It replaced the House of Assembly when the ACT was granted self-government in 1986. Voters had previously rejected self government in a 1978 plebiscite.

== Structure and membership ==
The Legislative Assembly has 25 members, elected from five electorates ― Brindabella, Ginninderra, Kurrajong, Murrumbidgee and Yerrabi ― each having five members. Members are elected for four-year terms by the Hare-Clark system, a variation of the Single Transferable Vote form of proportional representation.

Members of the Legislative Assembly vote to elect a Chief Minister. In practice, Chief Minister is the leader of whichever party is able to form government. The Chief Minister, in turn, selects ministers to form a cabinet. The leader of the second-largest party in the Assembly usually becomes the Leader of the Opposition.

Election dates for the Assembly are fixed in legislation, with elections held on the third Saturday in October every four years (until 1997, elections were held in February). The term of the Assembly was increased in 2004 from three to four years. The last election was held on Saturday 19 October 2024, with the next election expected to be held on 21 October 2028.

=== Current electorates ===
==== Brindabella ====
Electing five members to the Assembly, Brindabella contains the town centre and all of the suburbs of Tuggeranong. It also includes all of the ACT which is south of the Murrumbidgee River, thus making it the largest electorate by area. It used to exclude the whole of the suburb of Kambah.

==== Ginninderra ====
Electing five members to the Assembly, Ginninderra contains the town centre and all of the suburbs of Belconnen excluding Giralang and Kaleen. Its southern boundary was the Molonglo River prior to the 2016 election. It used to exclude the suburbs of Evatt, Lawson and McKellar.

==== Kurrajong ====
Electing five members to the Assembly, Kurrajong contains all the suburbs of Inner North Canberra, Inner South Canberra and Oaks Estate. It used to include the suburbs of Deakin, Yarralumla, Forrest and Red Hill.

==== Murrumbidgee ====
Electing five members to the Assembly, Murrumbidgee contains all the suburbs of the Molonglo Valley, Weston Creek, Woden Valley and also includes the suburbs of Deakin, Yarralumla, Forrest and Red Hill. It used to also include the whole of the suburb of Kambah.

==== Yerrabi ====
Electing five members to the Assembly, Yerrabi contains all the suburbs of Gungahlin as well as the Belconnen suburbs of Giralang and Kaleen and the village of Hall. It used to also include the suburbs of Evatt, Lawson and McKellar.

=== Former electorates ===
==== Molonglo ====
Molonglo was an electorate of the Australian Capital Territory Legislative Assembly that was contested from the 1995 election to the 2012 election, it covered Inner North Canberra, Inner South Canberra, Weston Creek and most of the suburbs of Woden and Gungahlin. It was a 7-seat electorate.

=== Current government ===
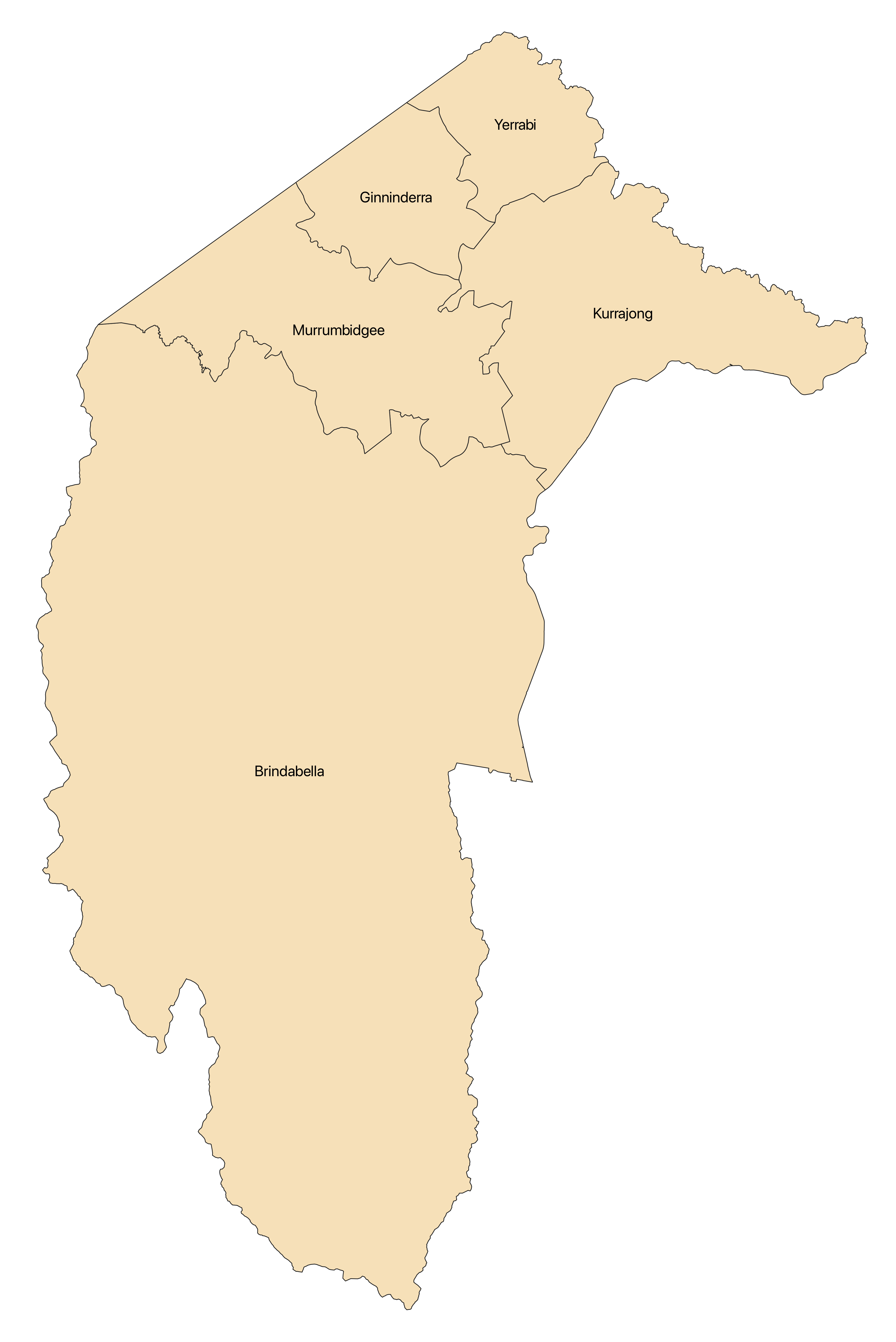
Electorates used for the 2020 election.

The current Chief Minister is Andrew Barr, who is also the Minister for Economic Development and Minister for Tourism and Trade. The position of Chief Minister is analogous to the Premier in the Australian states. Barr is the longest serving Chief Minister in ACT history, as well as the longest serving current Premier or Chief Minister in Australia, having taken the post in December 2014.

The ACT Labor Party has been in power since 2001, although with the exception of 2004-2008, have served in minority or coalition governments with the support of the ACT Greens.

At the 2020 Australian Capital Territory election, 10 Labor members, 9 Liberal members and 6 Greens members were elected.

Following the expulsion of Elizabeth Kikkert from the Canberra Liberals party room on 10 September 2024, the Liberals were left with 8 members, with Kikkert becoming an independent.

At the 2024 Australian Capital Territory election, 10 Labor members, 9 Liberal members, 4 Green members, 1 Independent for Canberra member, and 1 Fiona Carrick Independent member were elected, with Labor to hold power in a minority government.

Party	Seats held	Percentage	Seat distribution
Labor Party	10	34.2%	
Liberal Party	9	33.5%	
ACT Greens	4	12.1%	
Independents for Canberra	1	8.5%	
Fiona Carrick Independent	1	2.7%	

Electorate	Seats held
Brindabella	
Ginninderra	
Kurrajong	
Murrumbidgee	
Yerrabi	

Labor
Liberal
Green
IFC
FCI

=== Salary ===
As of 2024, Members of the Legislative Assembly are paid a base salary of $188,798, while additional remuneration is provided depending on the additional office or role the member holds.

Office	Additional Remuneration	Total Remuneration
Chief Minister	$207,678	$396,476
Deputy Chief Minister	$151,038	$339,836
Leader of the Opposition	$132,158	$320,956
Minister	$132,158	$320,956
Speaker/Presiding Officer	$103,839	$292,636
Deputy Leader of the Opposition	$37,760	$226,558
Deputy Speaker/Presiding Officer	$28,320	$217,118
Government/Opposition Whips	$18,880	$207,678
Presiding member of a committee concerned with public affairs rather than affairs of the Legislative Assembly	$18,880	$207,678

== History ==
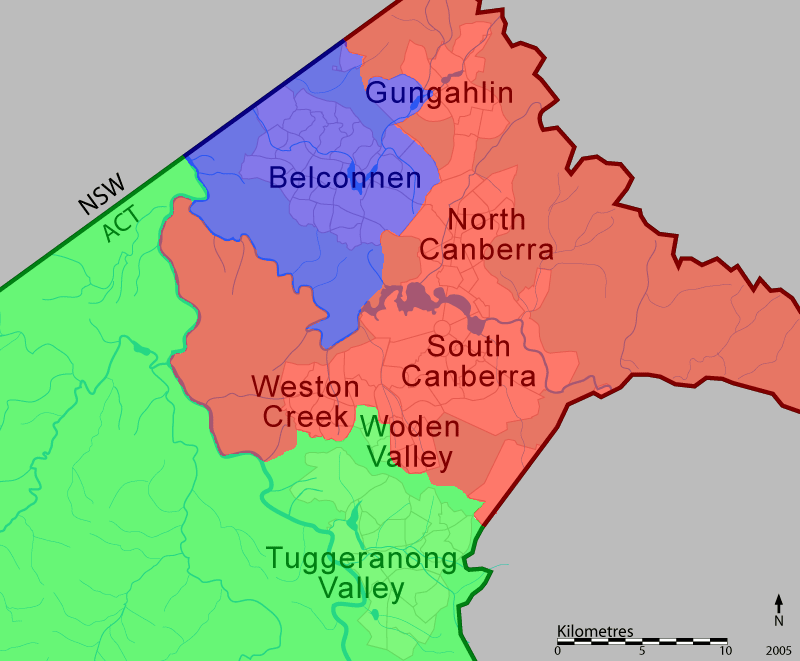
Map of ACT electorates prior to 2016 Molonglo Ginninderra Brindabella

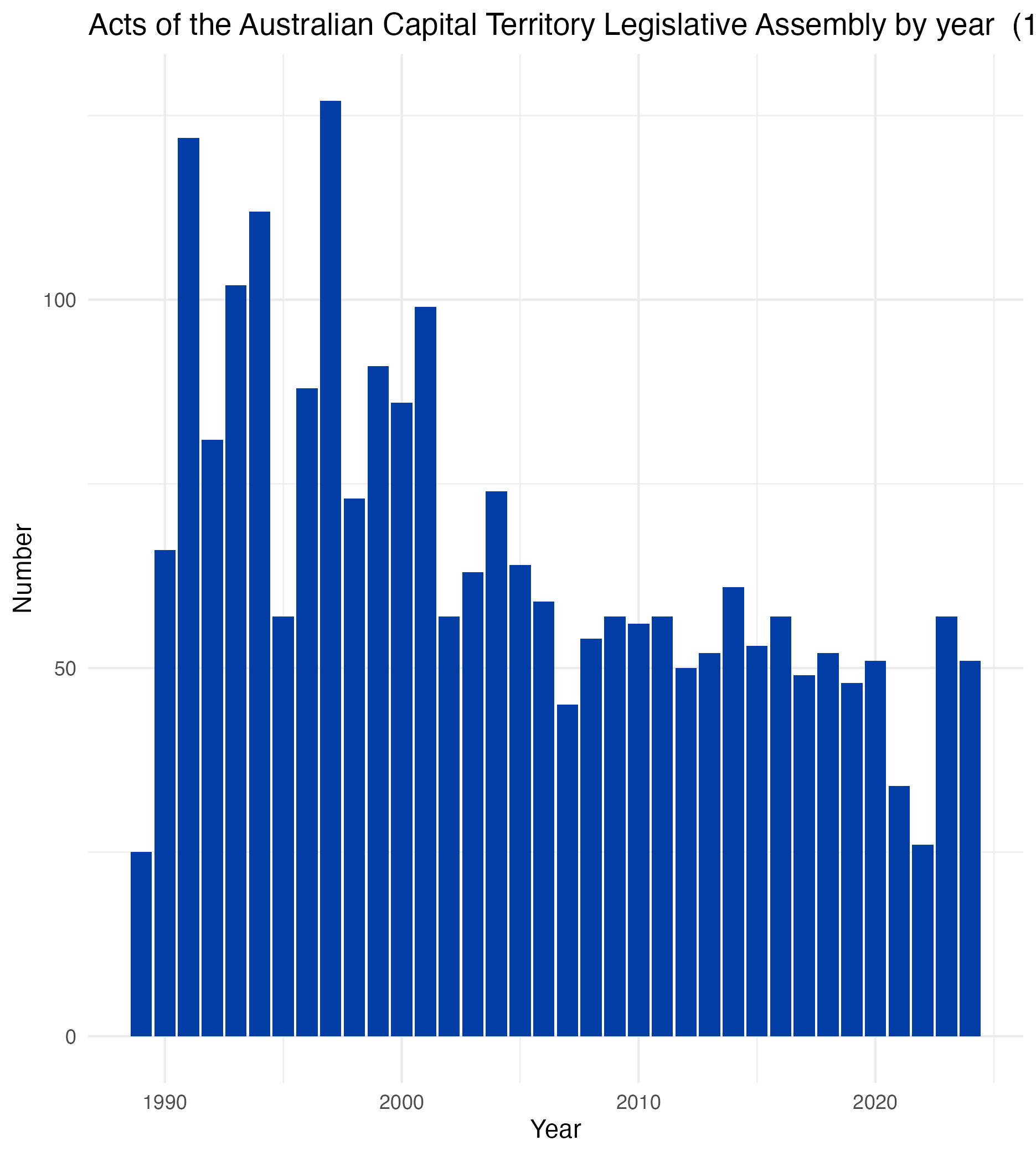
Bar chart showing the number of acts of the Australian Capital Territory Legislative Assembly by year (1989-2024)

The current Legislative Assembly was created by four acts of the Commonwealth Parliament in 1988, including the Australian Capital Territory (Self-Government) Act 1988. The first election was held on 4 March 1989 and the assembly first sat on 11 May that year. Until this point, the ACT had been directly administered by the Commonwealth Government. It replaced the House of Assembly (also known for a period as the Legislative Assembly), which existed from 1976 to 1986, but had no executive power, with a principal function of advising the Commonwealth on matters relating to the Territory.

=== Historical Composition ===
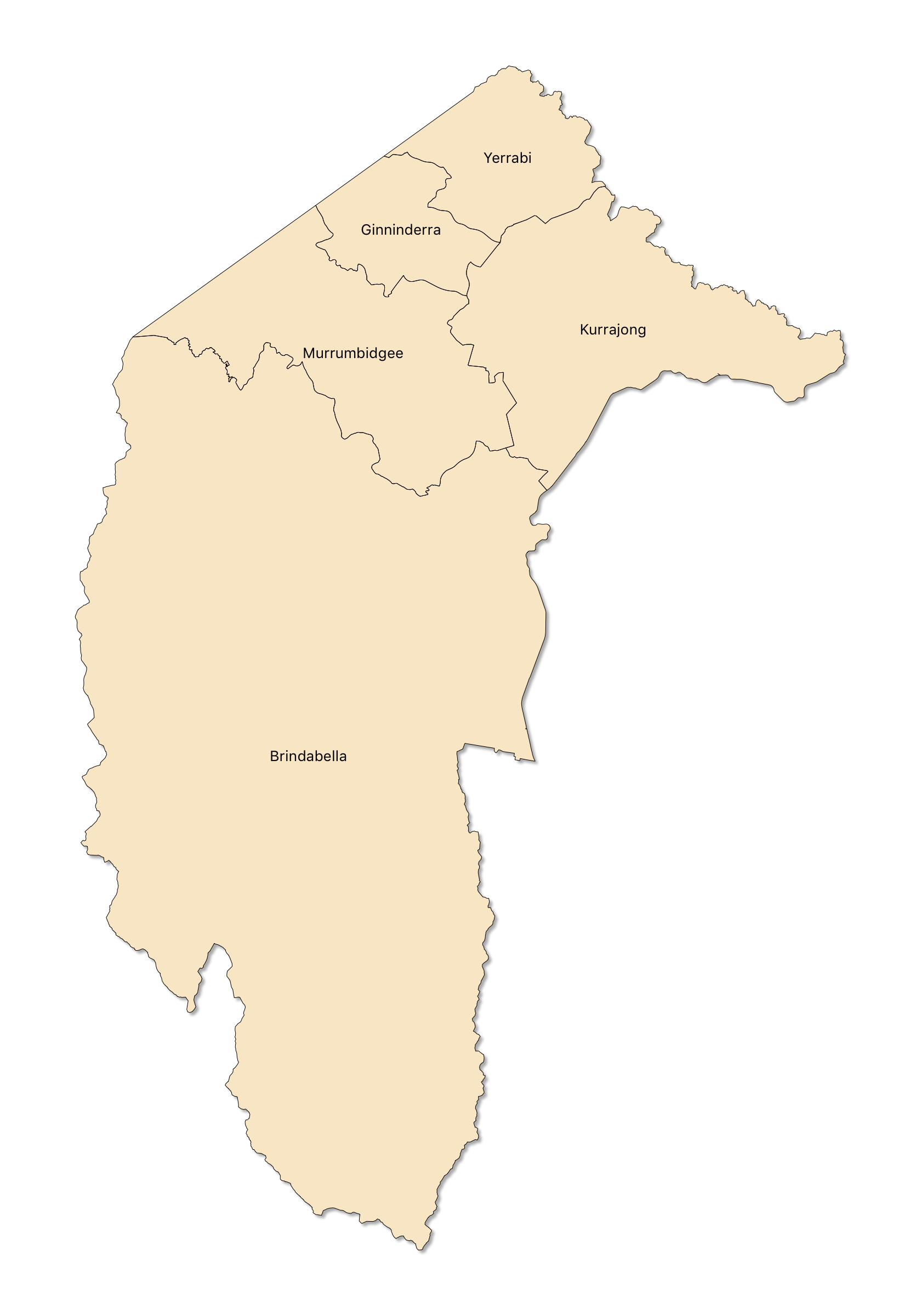
Electorates used for the 2016 election.

At its inception, the Assembly was elected by a modified d'Hondt system, the ACT comprised one electorate, electing seventeen members to the Assembly. A 1992 referendum supported the Hare-Clark method, which was introduced for the 1995 election. As of this change, the Legislative Assembly had 17 members, elected from three electorates. Brindabella and Ginninderra elected five members, and the now-defunct electorate of Molonglo elected seven.

On 30 April 2002, the ACT Electoral Commission made a submission to the ACT Legislative Assembly's Standing Committee on Legal Affairs, which inquired into the appropriateness of the size of the Legislative Assembly for the ACT, and options for changing the number of members and electorates. The Electoral Commission recommended increasing "the size of the Legislative Assembly to three electorates each returning seven members, giving a total of 21 members".

In 2014, the Assembly voted to expand the number of members to the present 25, with the change taking effect at the 2016 election.

There has only been one majority government in the history of the Legislative Assembly, with Labor winning 9 of 17 seats at the 2004 election.

=== Historical Results ===
	Primary vote				Seats				
	ALP	Lib	GRN	Oth.	ALP	Lib	GRN	Oth.	Total
4 March 1989 election	22.8%	14.9%	-	62.3%	5	4	-	8	17
15 February 1992 election	39.9%	29.0%	-	31.1%	8	6	-	3	17
18 February 1995 election	31.6%	40.5%	9.1%	18.8%	7	8	2	0	17
21 February 1998 election	27.7%	37.8%	9.1%	25.4%	6	7	1	3	17
20 October 2001 election	41.7%	31.6%	9.1%	17.6%	8	7	1	1	17
16 October 2004 election	46.8%	34.8%	9.3%	9.1%	9	7	1	0	17
18 October 2008 election	37.4%	31.6%	15.6%	15.4%	7	6	4	0	17
20 October 2012 election	38.88%	38.9%	10.8%	11.4%	8	8	1	0	17
15 October 2016 election	38.4%	36.7%	10.3%	14.6%	12	11	2	0	25
17 October 2020 election	37.8%	33.8%	13.5%	14.9%	10	9	6	0	25
19 October 2024 election	34.1%	33.4%	12.2%	20.3%	10	9	4	2	25

== Powers ==
As with the Northern Territory Legislative Assembly, the ACT Legislative Assembly lacks the full powers of a state legislature. Section 122 of the Constitution of Australia provides that the Commonwealth Parliament "may make laws for the government of any territory" surrendered by any state to the Commonwealth. The Governor-General, on the advice of the executive, previously had the power to override laws passed by the assembly. Although this was rare in practice, the Civil Unions Act 2006, which allowed same-sex couples to enter into "civil unions" was overruled following concerns that the civil unions mimicked marriage. In July 2006, the Federal Government again threatened to overrule the ACT Stanhope Government's anti-terror legislation, which was not consistent with other state laws. In 2011 the Federal Parliament passed a private senator's bill which removed this power in respect to both the Australian Capital Territory and the Northern Territory.

The ACT is unique among Australian states and self-governing territories, as it has no vice-regal post exercising authority as the representative of the monarch, such as a governor or an Administrator. The functions vested in a state governor or territorial administrator as nominal head of the executive—commissioning government, proroguing parliament and enacting legislation—are exercised by the Assembly itself and by the Chief Minister. Instead of vice-regal or regal assent, a bill passed by the ACT Legislative Assembly is enacted on "notification"—publication in the Government Gazette of a notice authorised by the Chief Minister. However, the Governor-General of Australia does have the power to dissolve the assembly if it is "incapable of effectively performing its functions or is conducting its affairs in a grossly improper manner".

== See also ==
- Lists of statutes of the Australian Capital Territory
- Government of the Australian Capital Territory
- 2020 Australian Capital Territory election
- Human Rights Act 2004
- Members of the Australian Capital Territory Legislative Assembly
- Parliaments of the Australian states and territories
- Labor–Greens coalition
- Electoral systems of the Australian states and territories
- Australian Capital Territory ministries
