= Giralang =

- Suburb
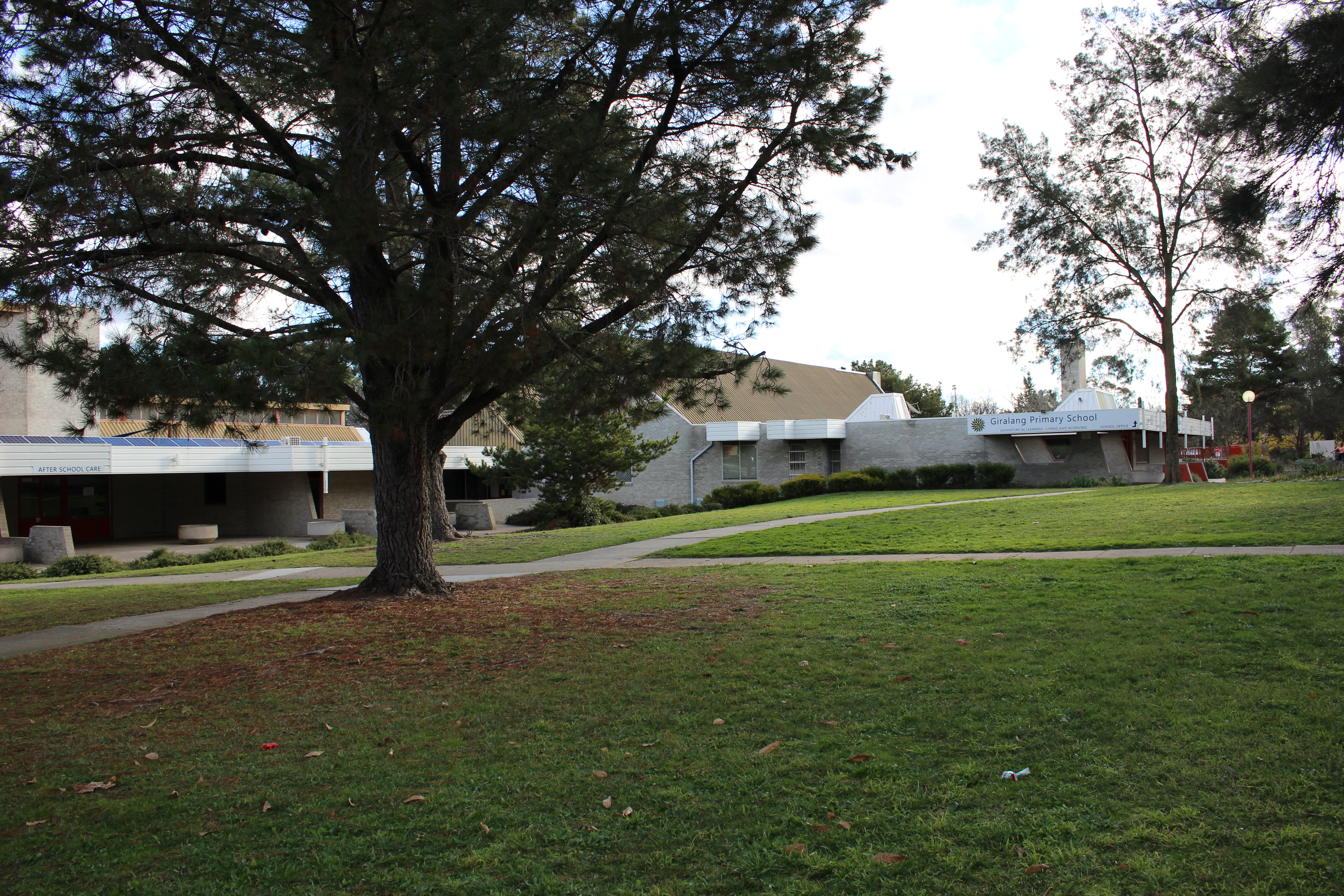
- Giralang Primary

- Coordinates: 35°12′43″S 149°05′50″E
- Country: Australia
- State: Australian Capital Territory
- City: Canberra
- District: Belconnen
- Location: 12 km (7.5 mi) NNW of Canberra CBD; 26 km (16 mi) NW of Queanbeyan; 93 km (58 mi) SW of Goulburn; 290 km (180 mi) SW of Sydney
- Established: 1974

Government
  - Territory electorate: Yerrabi
  - Federal division: Canberra

Area
  - Total: 2.4 km^{2} (0.93 sq mi)
- Elevation: 599 m (1,965 ft)

Population
  - Total: 3,372 (SAL 2021)
- Postcode: 2617
Suburbs around Giralang
Nicholls	Nicholls	Crace
McKellar	Giralang	Crace
McKellar	Lawson	Kaleen

Giralang (/ɡɪrəlæŋ/) is a suburb of the Belconnen district of Canberra, located within the Australian Capital Territory, Australia.

The suburb is named after the word in the language of the Wiradhuri Aboriginal tribe of the Central West of New South Wales, meaning star. The suburb name was gazetted on 15 January 1974. Streets in Giralang are named after Aboriginal words for stars, astronomers and constellations seen from the southern hemisphere.

In the suburb is the Giralang District Playing fields and adjacent Giralang Primary School. The suburb is bordered by Baldwin Drive, Gundaroo Drive and the Barton Highway.

== Educational facilities ==
Giralang Primary School was under threat to close in 2006. After completion of the school closure process it was decided that Giralang Primary School would remain open.

In 2011, a Jewish mikvah opened in Giralang. An early childhood education and care facility for Jewish children opened in 2013 in the refurbished former Giralang Preschool building.

== Geology ==
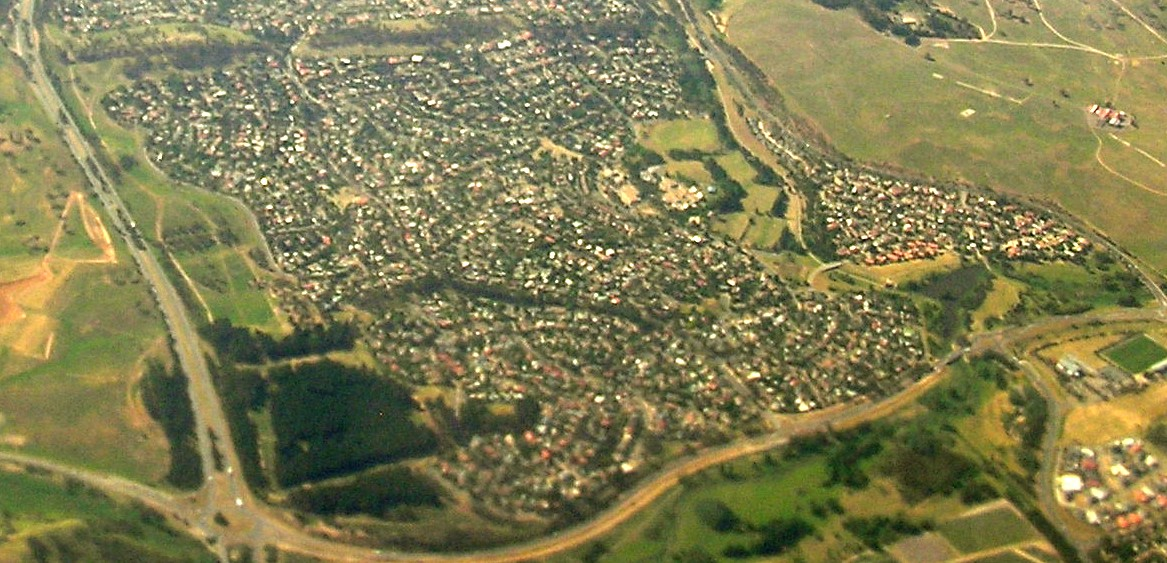
Aerial view of Giralang, from the west.

Ordovician age Pittman Formation greywacke and turbidites are found in the far east and northwest including a band of Acton Shale occurring right on the eastern border of the suburb. Next in the centre, south and north west of Giralang there are late Silurian sedimentary rocks. From the east to west there are, mudstone, State Circle Shale, and then micaceous Black Mountain Sandstone that contains lenses of shale. In the south west of Giralang is calcareous shale from the Canberra Formation. A long fault heading north west roughly parallel to Ginninderra Creek is marked on the surface by an iron oxide reef. In the south of Giralang this fault separates the Canberra formation from State Circle Shale uplifted on the east side.
