= Canberra Link =

Long-distance rail and coach service in Australia

- V/Line coach to Canberra in Gundagai in 2026

Overview
- Service type: Regional rail/coach
- Status: Operational
- Locale: Victoria–ACT
- First service: 27 April 1987; 39 years ago
- Current operator: V/Line

Route
- Termini: Southern Cross, Melbourne; Jolimont Centre, Canberra
- Stops: 19
- Distance travelled: 663 km (412 mi)
- Service frequency: One service daily each direction

On-board services
- Class: Economy
- Catering facilities: Yes (rail only)
- Baggage facilities: Yes (rail and coach)

Canberra Link is a long-distance rail and coach service operated by V/Line between the Australian state of Victoria and the Australian Capital Territory. The service runs as a rail service from Southern Cross station in Melbourne to the regional city of Wodonga, where passengers switch to a coach that travels to Jolimont Centre in Canberra. Two services – one travelling each direction – operate per day.

== History ==
V/Line introduced the Canberra Link service on 27 April 1987. Its initial fare was A$39 for adults and A$23.50 for concession card holders.

In addition to Canberra Link, V/Line operates Capital Link as another rail–coach service from Melbourne to Canberra, which was introduced on 20 February 1989. It runs as a rail service along the Gippsland railway line from Southern Cross to Bairnsdale station, where it becomes a coach service and travels via Orbost and Cooma to reach Jolimont Centre.

At present, Canberra Link and Capital Link are the only direct public transport services between Melbourne and Canberra. Several other limited-stop bus services run between the two cities through private operators, including Greyhound Australia and FlixBus. There is no direct rail service from Melbourne to Canberra, but passengers can take the NSW TrainLink XPT service from Southern Cross to Goulburn station, then connect to an Xplorer that travels to Canberra station.

== Operations ==
Coach services are operated by Dysons under contract to V/Line.

=== Route ===
The V/Line rail service on the Albury line departs Southern Cross station at 7:07am, running through Melbourne Yard, then along the South Kensington–West Footscray railway line, the Albion–Jacana railway line, and then the North East railway line from Jacana station (where it does not stop) to Broadmeadows station.

After Broadmeadows, it skips three metropolitan and seven regional stations before reaching Seymour. The service continues to run along the North East line, stopping at seven stations until it reaches Wodonga, where passengers travelling to Canberra exit and enter a coach; passengers have the ability to stay on the train one stop further to Albury station, where it meets the coach at 11:05am.

The coach service makes six stops on its way to Canberra, including a ten-minute stop at the Gundagai Visitor Information Centre. It is scheduled to reach Jolimont Centre in Canberra at 3:20pm, where passengers can connect with local bus services at City Interchange and the light rail at Alinga Street.

For services travelling from Canberra to Melbourne, the route runs the opposite way and departs Jolimont Centre approximately one hour later at 8:05am, reaching Gundagai at 10am, Wodonga at 12:40pm and Southern Cross at 4:33pm.

=== Stops ===
Canberra Link
Station/Stop	Image	Suburb/Town	Connections	Time (Note: Travel time in minutes from Southern Cross.)
Southern Cross		Docklands	Metropolitan train Metropolitan tram Metropolitan bus Regional coach Skybus	0
Broadmeadows		Broadmeadows	Metropolitan train Metropolitan bus	28
Seymour		Seymour	Regional bus Regional coach	79
Avenel		Avenel		90
Euroa		Euroa	Regional bus Regional coach	109
Violet Town		Violet Town		120
Benalla		Benalla	Regional bus Regional coach	137
Wangaratta		Wangaratta	Regional bus Regional coach	162
Springhurst		Springhurst	Regional coach	175
Chiltern		Chiltern	Regional coach	183
Wodonga		Wodonga	Regional coach	200 (Note: Service dwells for 18 minutes.)
Passengers switch from rail service to coach
Albury		Albury	Regional train	238
BP Service Station/Hume Highway		Woomargama		273
Albury Street		Holbrook		288
Sydney Street		Tarcutta		338
Tourist Information Centre		Gundagai		368 (Note: Service dwells for 10 minutes.)
Yass Bus Interchange		Yass		448
Barton Highway		Murrumbateman		463
Jolimont Centre		Canberra City	Light rail in Canberra Buses in Canberra	493
