= Dickson Interchange =

Metro and bus station in Canberra, Australia

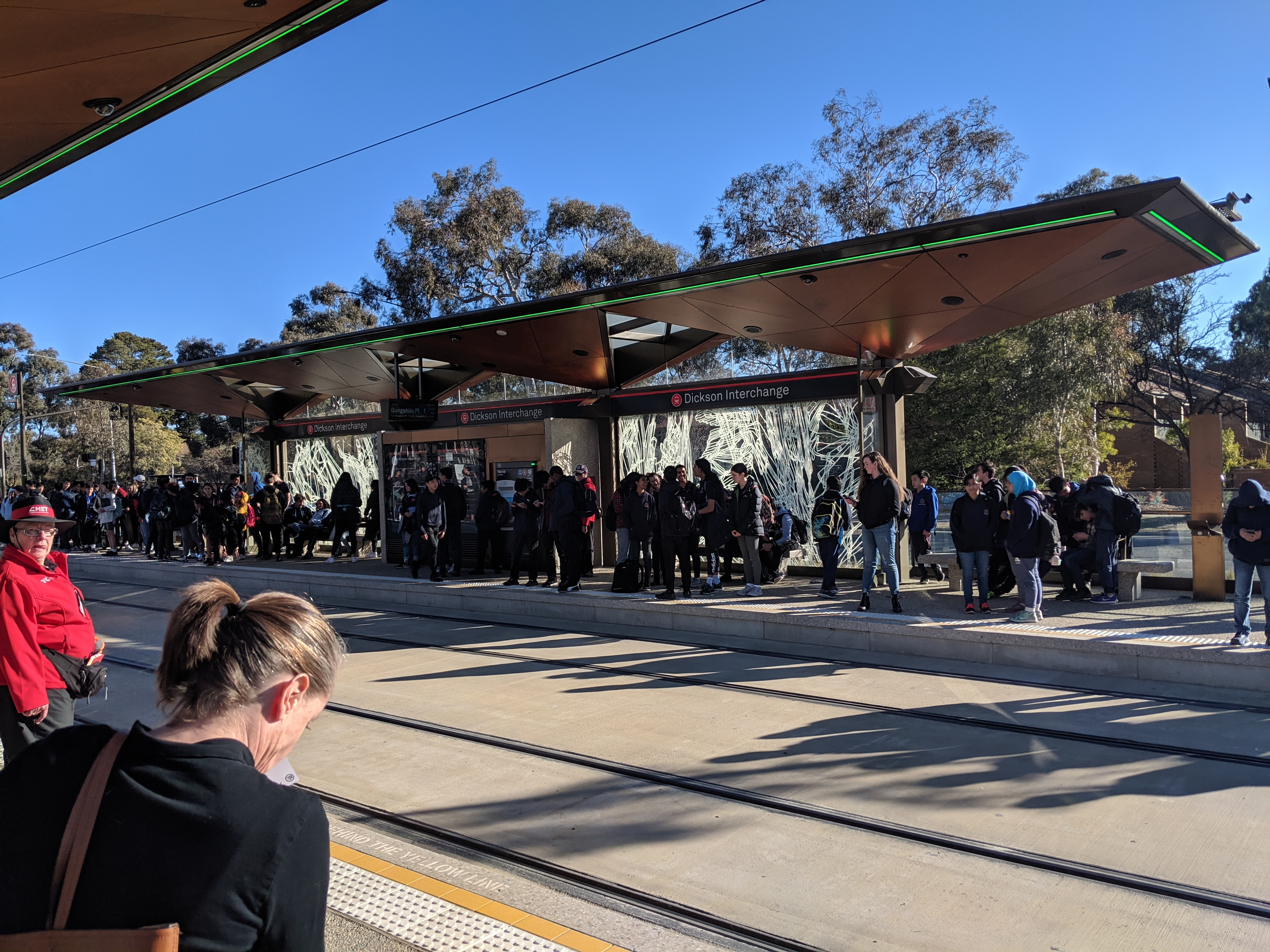

General information
- Location: Northbourne Avenue, Dickson/Lyneham
- Coordinates: 35°15′01″S 149°08′01″E
- Operator: Transport Canberra
- Line: R1
- Platforms: 2 (side)
- Tracks: 2
- Connections: ACTION bus services

Construction
- Structure type: Ground
- Cycle facilities: Yes
- Accessible: Yes

History
- Opened: 20 April 2019

Services
Preceding station	Canberra Metro	Following station
Swinden Street towards Gungahlin Place	R1	Macarthur Avenue towards Alinga Street
Location

Dickson Interchange is a transport interchange in Dickson, an inner-northern suburb of Canberra. The interchange allows transfers between the Canberra Metro light rail network and local ACTION bus services. As part of the construction of the Civic to Gungahlin light rail line, a new $4 million bus interchange opened in 2018. The interchange was built on land compulsorily acquired by the ACT Government in 2015, the terms of which were not disclosed to the public. Construction allowed direct access for bus and pedestrian traffic between Northbourne Avenue and Challis Street, as well as accommodation for up to nine local bus routes, a new taxi rank, kiss and ride facilities and signalised pedestrian crossings. The new facilities became an important connection point for commuters under a redesigned timetable that integrated bus and light rail services in early 2019.

Between the station's opening and February 2020, 11% of all light rail passengers boarded or alighted at Dickson Interchange, making it the busiest intermediate station on the line.

== Services ==
The light rail platforms are located in the central median of Northbourne Avenue, while most bus services depart from a dedicated thoroughfare connecting to Cape Street. Additional shelters are provided on both sides of Northbourne Avenue to service light rail replacement buses when required.

=== Light rail ===
Line	Destinations	Notes
R1	Alinga Street	
R1	EPIC and Racecourse*, Gungahlin Place	* Limited peak hours services only

=== ACTION bus services ===
Route number	Commences	Terminates
R9	Belconnen (Cohen Street) via Canberra Stadium	Watson
30	Belconnen (Cohen Street) via University of Canberra	Dickson Shops
31	Belconnen (Cohen Street) via Kaleen	City Interchange
50	Watson	City Interchange
51	Dickson Shops	City Interchange via Lyneham, O'Connor
53	Dickson Shops	National Museum via Ainslie, Hackett and City Interchange

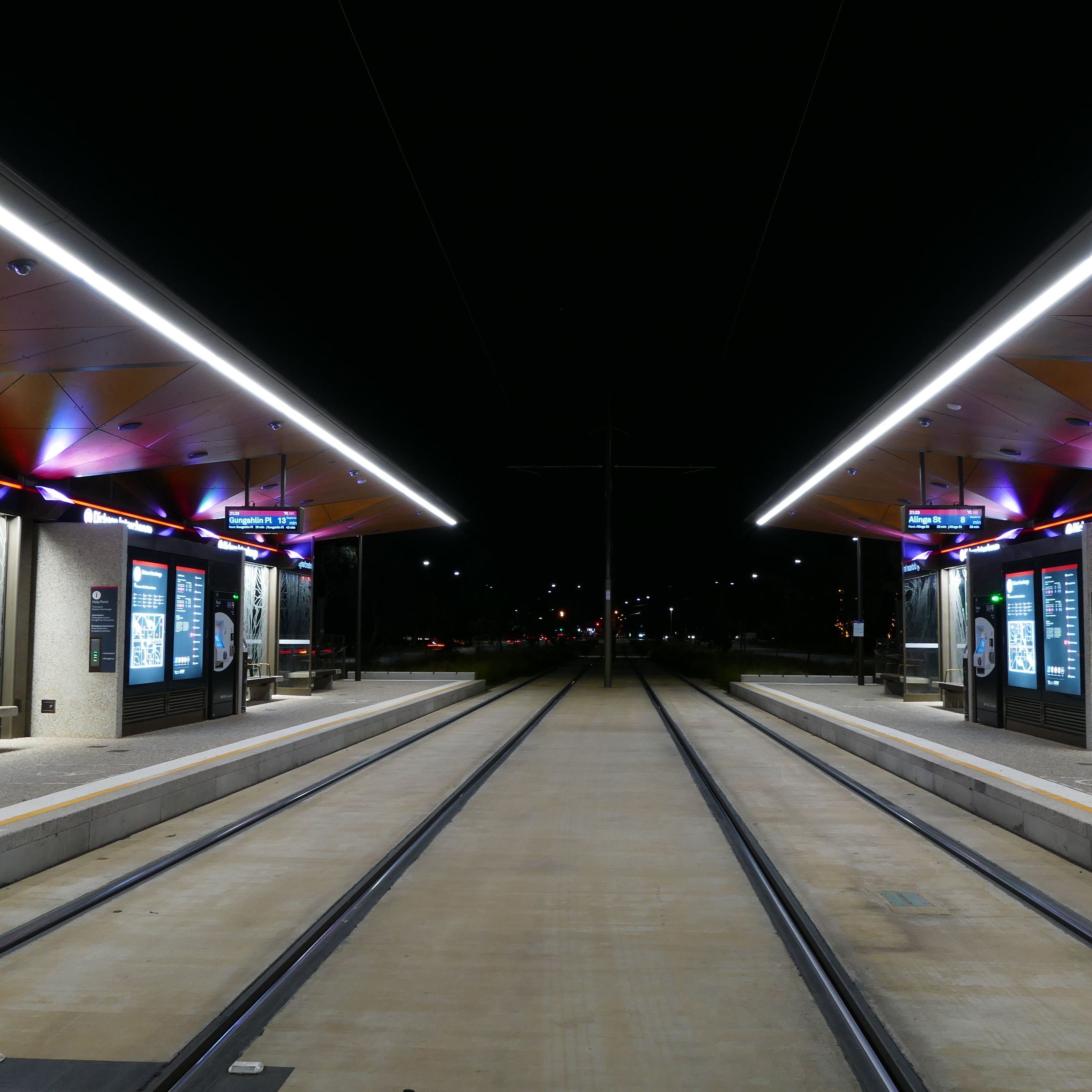
Dickson Interchange facing northward at night on 4 August 2020.
