= Transport in Canberra =

The Transport Canberra public transport logos. Left to right: light rail, bus

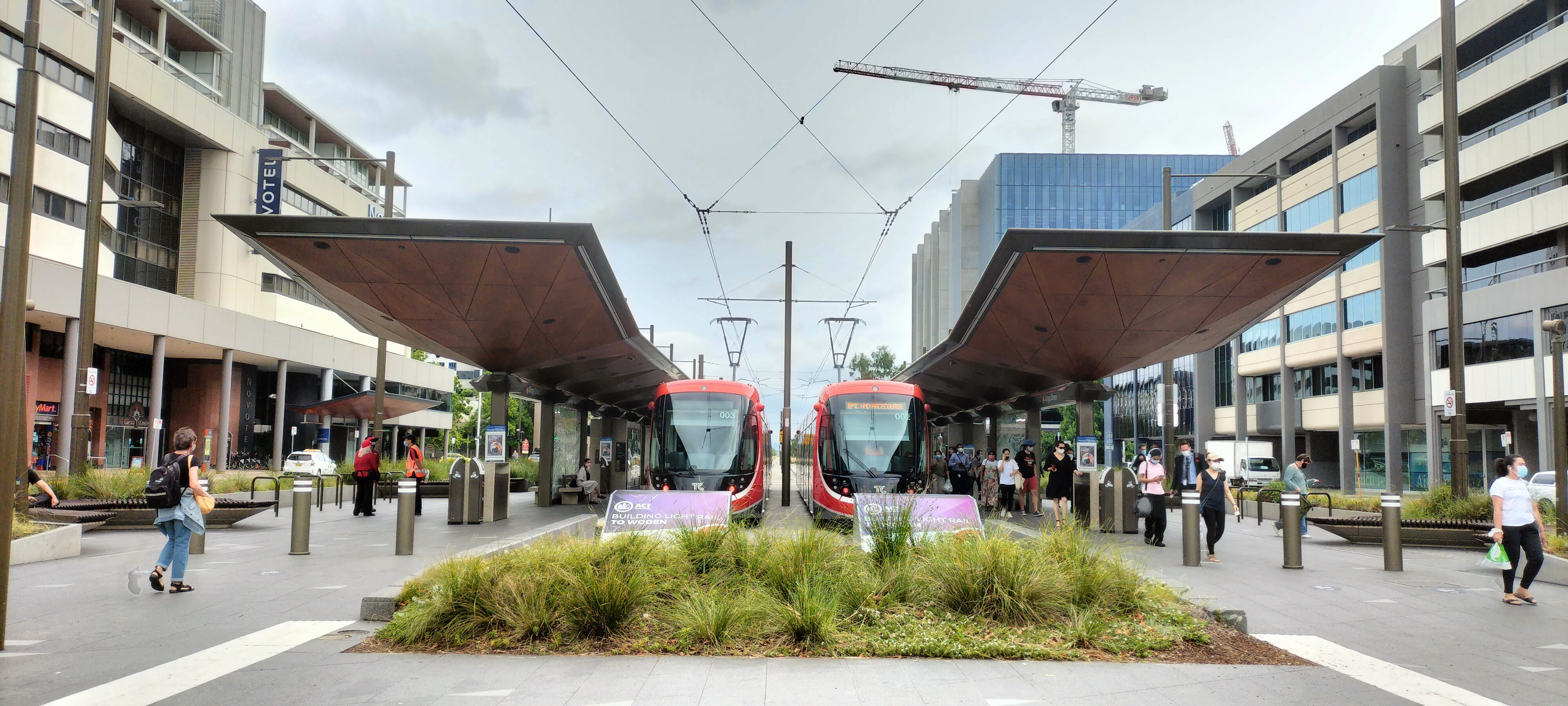
The Alinga Street light rail station with the Jolimont Centre on the left, 2022

Transport in Canberra is provided by private cars, buses, walking, cycling, taxis and light rail for travel within the city, while regional rail, air, and long-distance coach services operate for travel beyond Canberra. A vast road network also plays a major role in transport within and beyond the city.

Most travel within Canberra is provided by private vehicles (75% of trips / 90% of travel distance), walking (18% / 2.2%), public transport (3.6% / 5.2%) and bicycling (2.5% / 1.3%).

== Transport Canberra ==
On 1 July 2016, Transport Canberra, a division of Transport Canberra & City Services, was formed to manage all public transport operations within the Australian Capital Territory including ACTION bus services and light rail planning and construction, previously managed by the Capital Metro Agency.

== Roads ==
The automobile is by far the dominant form of transport in Canberra. The city is laid out so that arterial roads connecting inhabited clusters run through undeveloped areas of open land or forest, which results in a low population density; this also means that idle land is available for the development of future transport corridors if necessary without the need to build tunnels or acquire developed residential land. In contrast, other capital cities in Australia have substantially less green space.

Canberra's districts are generally connected by parkways—limited access dual carriageway roads with speed limits generally set at a maximum of 100 km/h (62 mph). An example is the Tuggeranong Parkway which links Canberra's CBD and Tuggeranong, and bypasses Weston Creek. In most districts, discrete residential suburbs are bounded by main arterial roads with only a few residential link roads in, to deter non-local traffic from cutting through residential areas.

In an effort to improve road safety, traffic cameras were first introduced to Canberra by the Kate Carnell Government in 1999. The traffic cameras installed in Canberra include fixed red-light and speed cameras and point-to-point speed cameras; together they bring in revenue of approximately $11 million per year in fines.

== Bus ==
=== ACTION ===
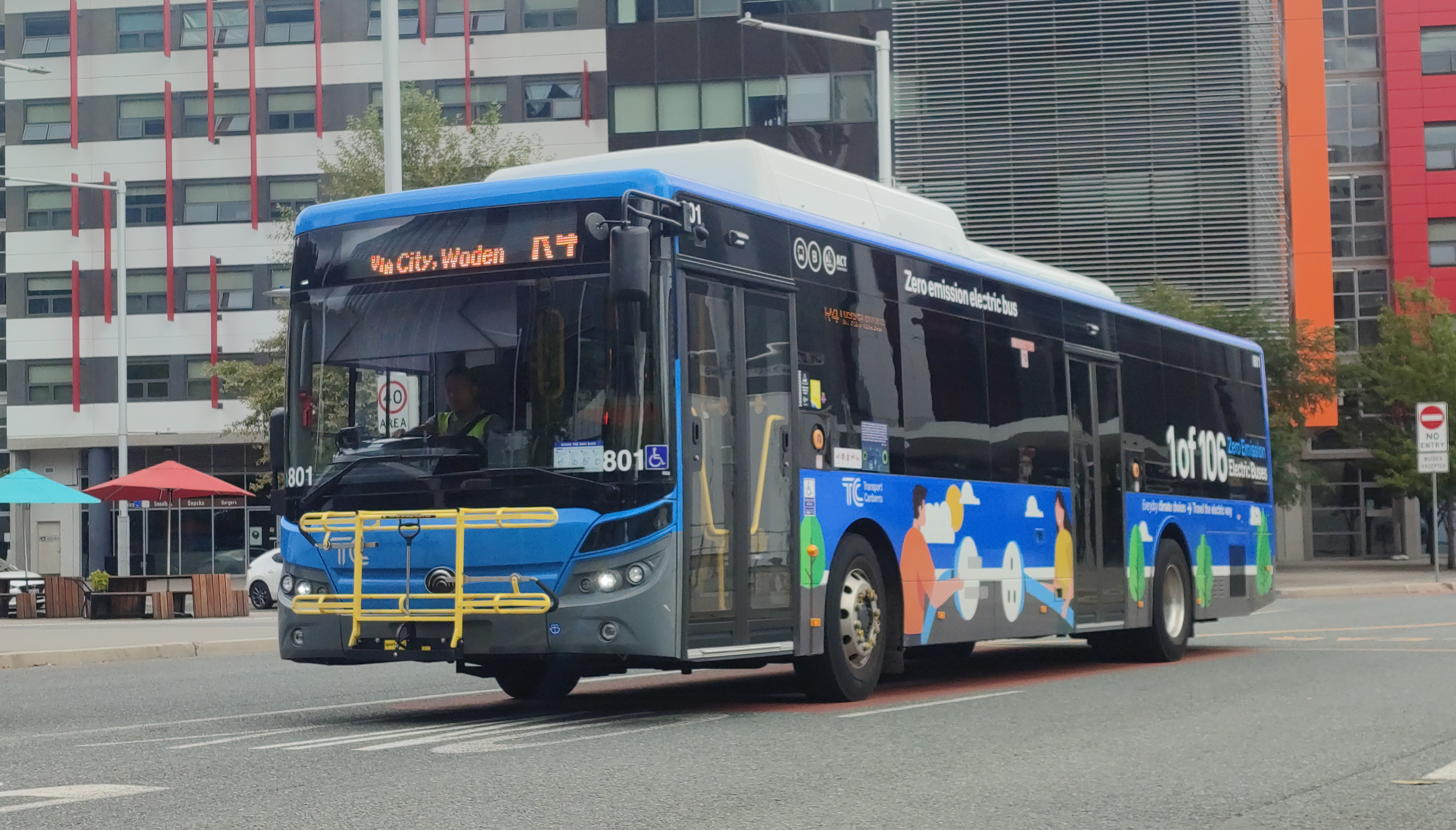
Yutong E12 electric bus owned by ACTION, 2024

The largest public transport operator is the Government of the Australian Capital Territory owned ACTION. In July 1926, the Federal Capital Commission commenced operating bus services in Canberra. With the opening of Old Parliament House in May 1927, and the associated relocation of Australian Commonwealth Government departments to Canberra, the frequency of service offered by the Canberra City Omnibus Service increased as the population of the new city grew.

During the early 1950s, bus services were expanded to Narrabundah, Yarralumla and O'Connor. These routes were extended further in the late 1950s with the development of Dickson and Campbell.

In August 1963, the first Woden Valley services were introduced. Similar early services were provided for other areas. From 1961 the new Russell Offices complex demanded a growing number of additional peak services, including feeders from the city. The Canberra fleet grew from 25 buses in 1942 to over 90 in 1966.

In March 1968, a reformed bus network was introduced. It involved new bus timetables and driver schedules, based on regular services on all routes throughout the day with synchronised movements through the main centres. In February 1977, a new system was unveiled and the operation renamed Australian Capital Territory Internal Omnibus Network (ACTION).

Today ACTION operates routes throughout the Australian Capital Territory with a fleet of 456 buses.

=== CDC Canberra ===
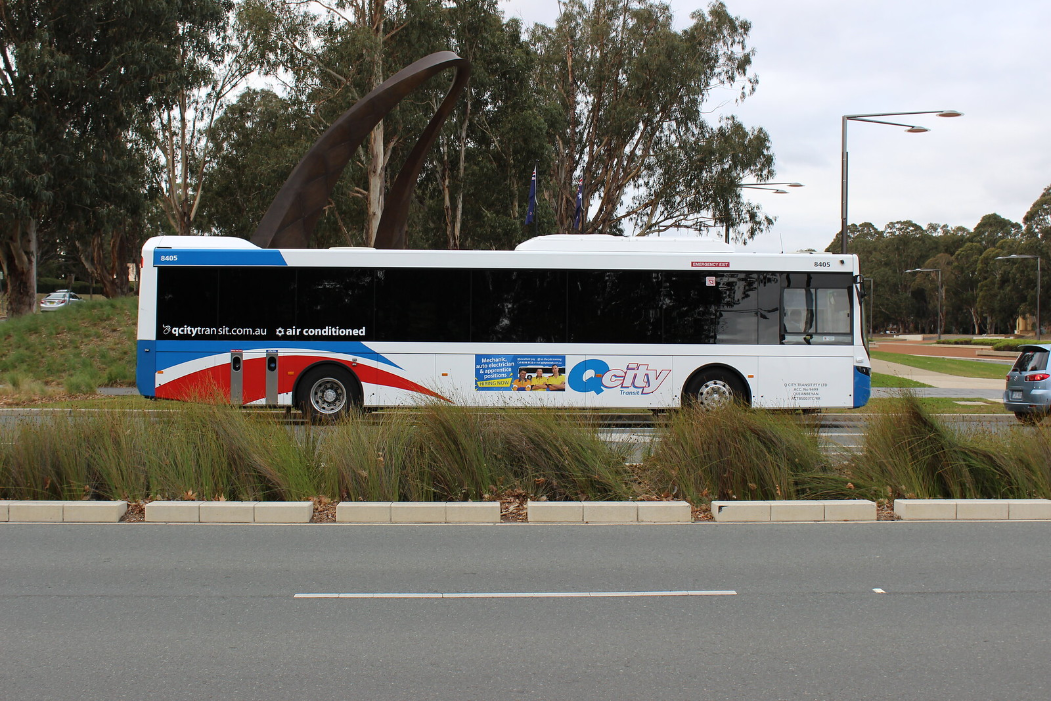
Qcity Transit Volgren bodied Volvo B7RLE, June 2018

CDC Canberra, formerly known as Qcity Transit, operates bus services from the neighbouring city of Queanbeyan to Canberra City. As well as these services it also has services that can run to the town of Yass. It is owned by ComfortDelGro Australia, which purchased the business in August 2012.

CDC Canberra is permitted to carry passengers within the Australian Capital Territory, with the previous restriction being lifted in June 2012.

== Coach ==
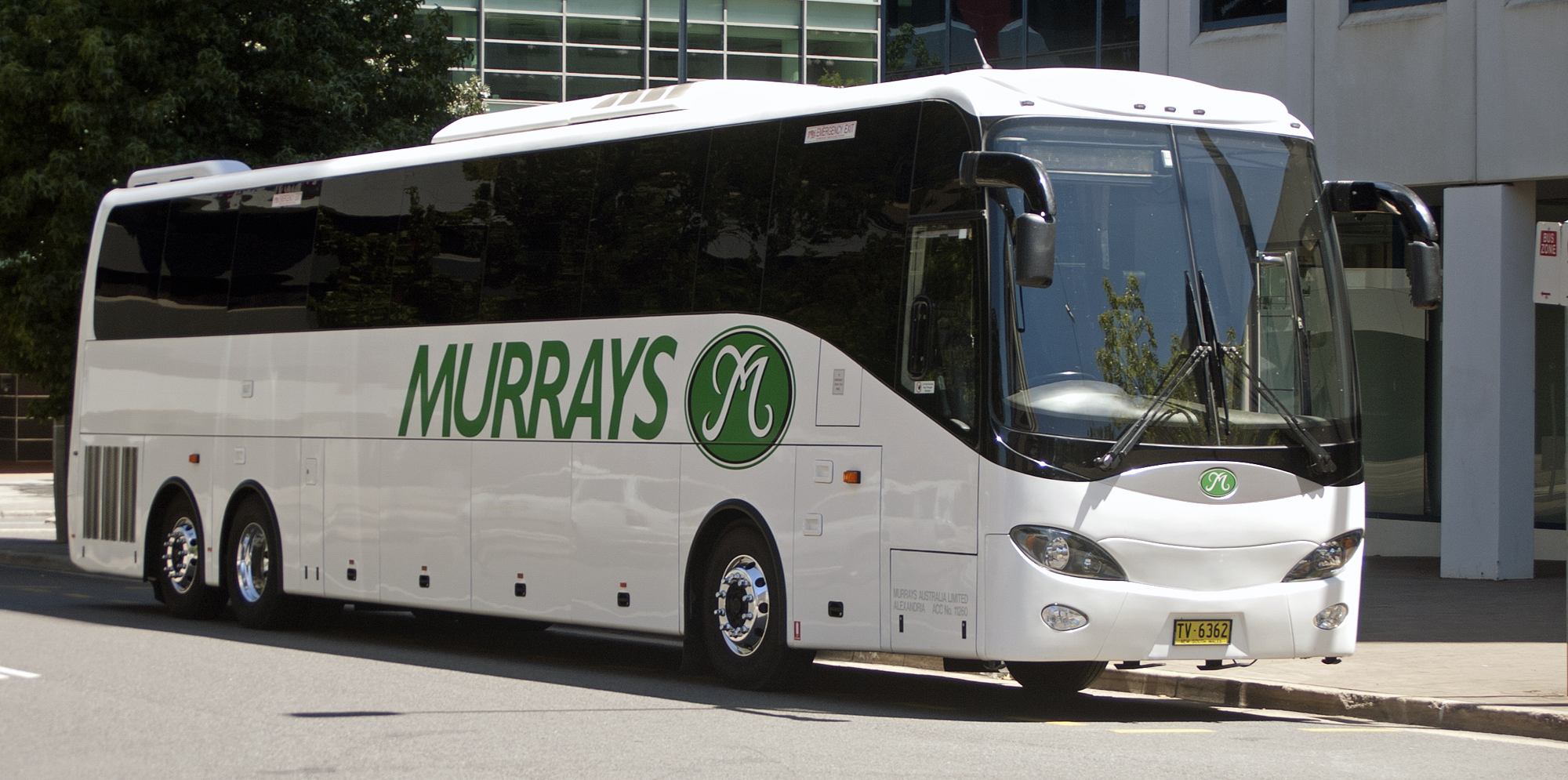
Murrays BCI JXK613 coach in Canberra, January 2011

Canberra is served by a number of long-distance coach operators, running from the Jolimont Centre.

- Greyhound Australia operate services to Melbourne and Sydney
- Murrays operate services to Narooma, Sydney and Wollongong
- NSW TrainLink operate services to Bombala, Cootamundra and Eden
- V/Line operates services to Albury and Bairnsdale

== Rail ==
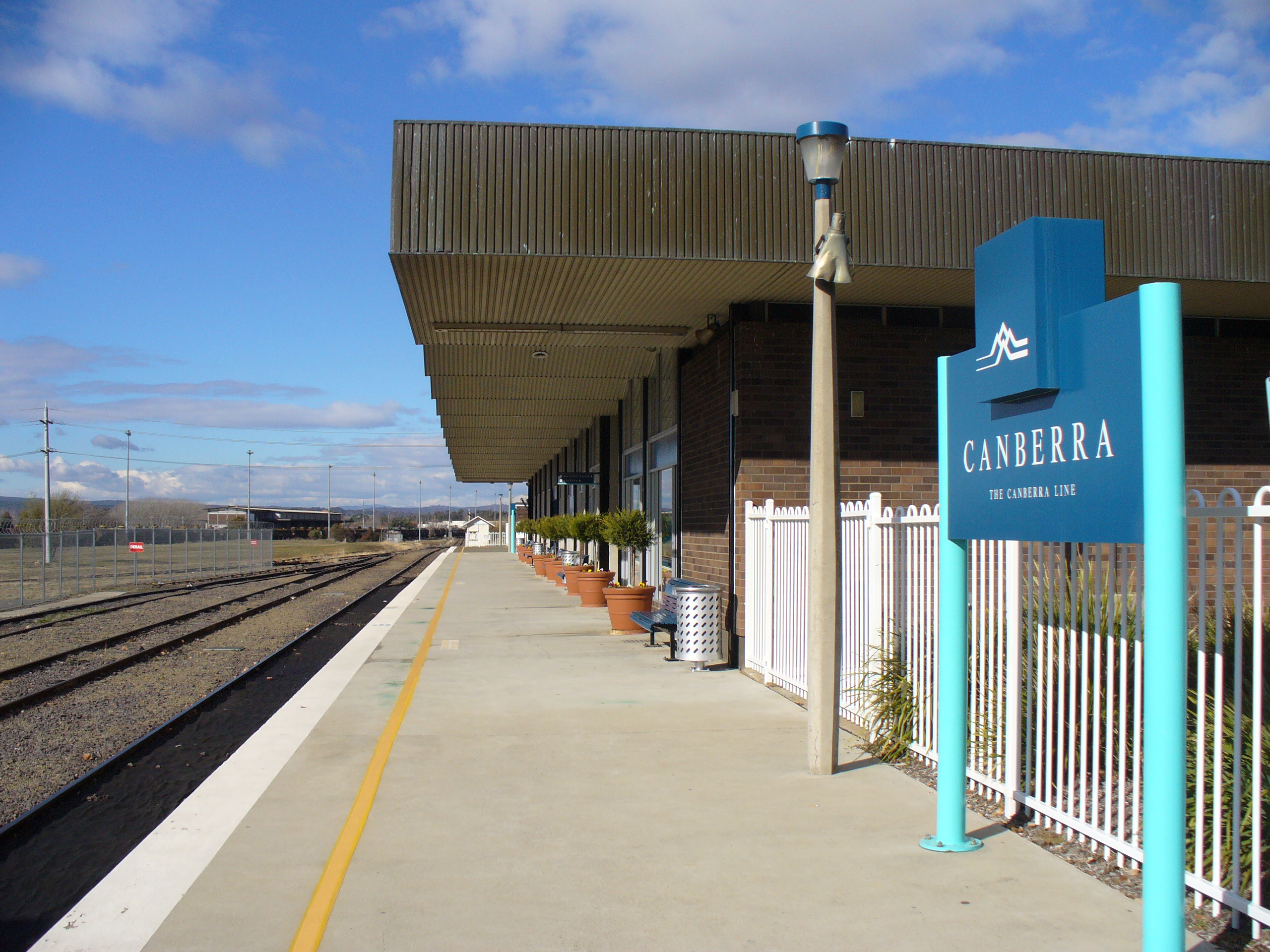
Canberra railway station, 2007

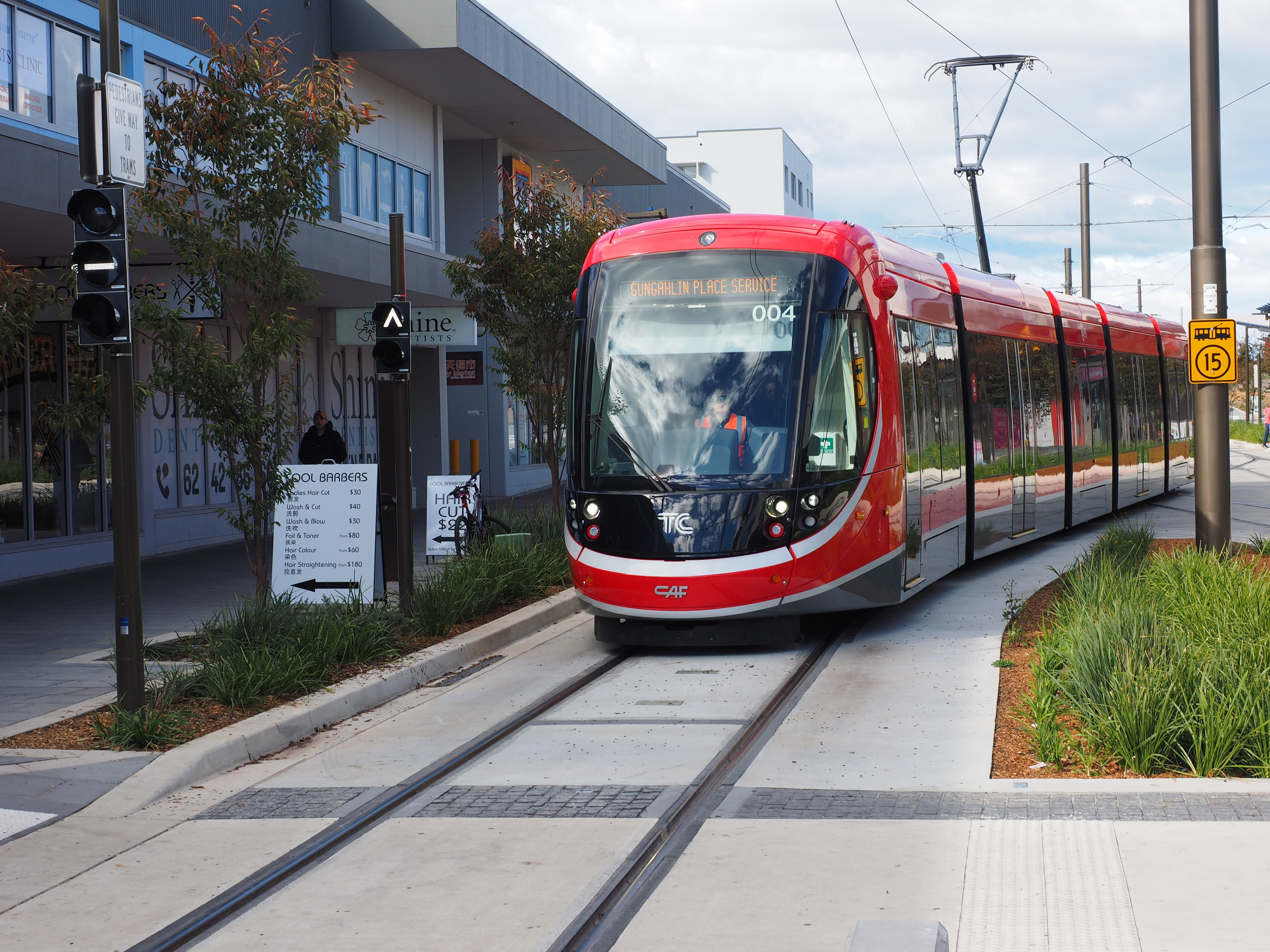
CAF Urbos 3 tram, May 2019

=== Heavy ===
Walter Burley Griffin's master plan for Canberra included a railway that was to run from Queanbeyan to the current Canberra railway station in Kingston, then north along a causeway and over the Molonglo River to Russell, along Amaroo Street to Civic, and then north out of the city along Lonsdale and Ijong Streets.

However, apart from the current track from Queanbeyan to Kingston, the only other part of the route constructed went as far as Civic, but was built cheaply and lightly, to carry construction materials. The section was opened in mid-1921 but, only 18 months later, flooding of the Molonglo River washed away the central supports of the timber trestle bridge and the line became disused. It was dismantled in 1940.

Since March 1927, Canberra has been served by trains from Sydney, with the Federal City Express, Canberra Monaro Express, Southern Highlands Express and Canberra Express all having provided that link, the latter being operated by an XPT from August 1983 until February 1990. An overnight service was provided with a carriage detached from the Cooma Mail at Queanbeyan. From April 1962 until March 1975, a through carriage was detached from the Spirit of Progress at Goulburn providing a connection with Melbourne.

Today Canberra is served by three daily NSW TrainLink Xplorer services each way to Sydney.

=== Light rail ===
The Canberra light rail stage 1 operates between Gungahlin Place and Canberra City, travelling along Flemington Road and Northbourne Avenue. A 1.7 km extension (stage 2A) is under construction.

=== High speed rail ===
Canberra has been on the map of various high-speed rail proposals since 1984. The last serious attempt with government backing was terminated in December 2000.

== Ticketing ==
Canberra has an integrated ticketing system between bus and light rail using the MyWay, a smartcard system introduced in 2011 by ACTION.

== Air ==
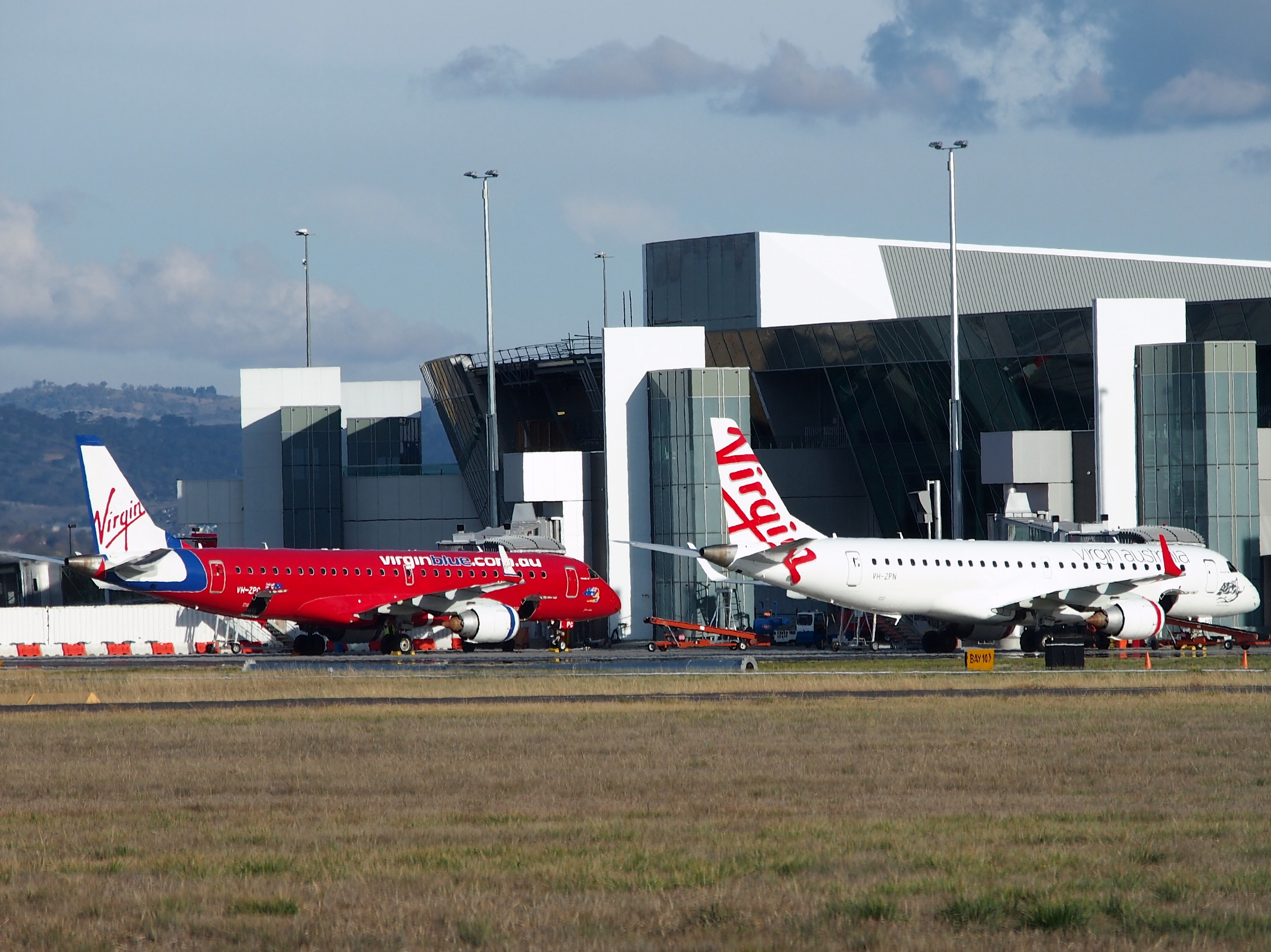
Virgin Australia Embraer E190s at Canberra Airport, July 2013

Canberra Airport is serviced by Qantas, QantasLink, Virgin Australia and FlyPelican with services to Adelaide, Brisbane, Gold Coast, Melbourne, Perth, Sydney, Newcastle and Dubbo. In September 2016, Singapore Airlines commenced operating international flights to Singapore and Wellington, and in February 2018, Qatar Airways commenced operating international flights to Doha.

== History ==
Since the days of the Griffin Plan, corridors have been reserved for high-capacity, fixed-route public transport.

In 1977, ACTION said it was providing 15 minute bus frequencies to 27 suburbs all-day. Canberra was a pioneer of the timed-transfer bus system, and was cited as a model in a 1981 study for the US Department of Transportation.

In 1974 the National Capital Development Commission announced a shift in transport planning, designed primarily to prioritise intertown public transport and discourage private vehicles for commuting.

By 1984, the roads policy was designed contrary to the 1974 transport policy, which has led to Canberra being a car-dominated city.

== Sources ==
- The Penguin Australia Road Atlas. Ringwood, Victoria: Penguin Books Australia. 2000. ISBN 0-670-88980-6.
- UBD Canberra. North Ryde, New South Wales: Universal Publishers. 2007. ISBN 978-0-7319-1882-9.
