= Dickson Centre, Australian Capital Territory =

Group centre in Dickson, Canberra, Australia

Coordinates: 35°15′0″S 149°08′15″E

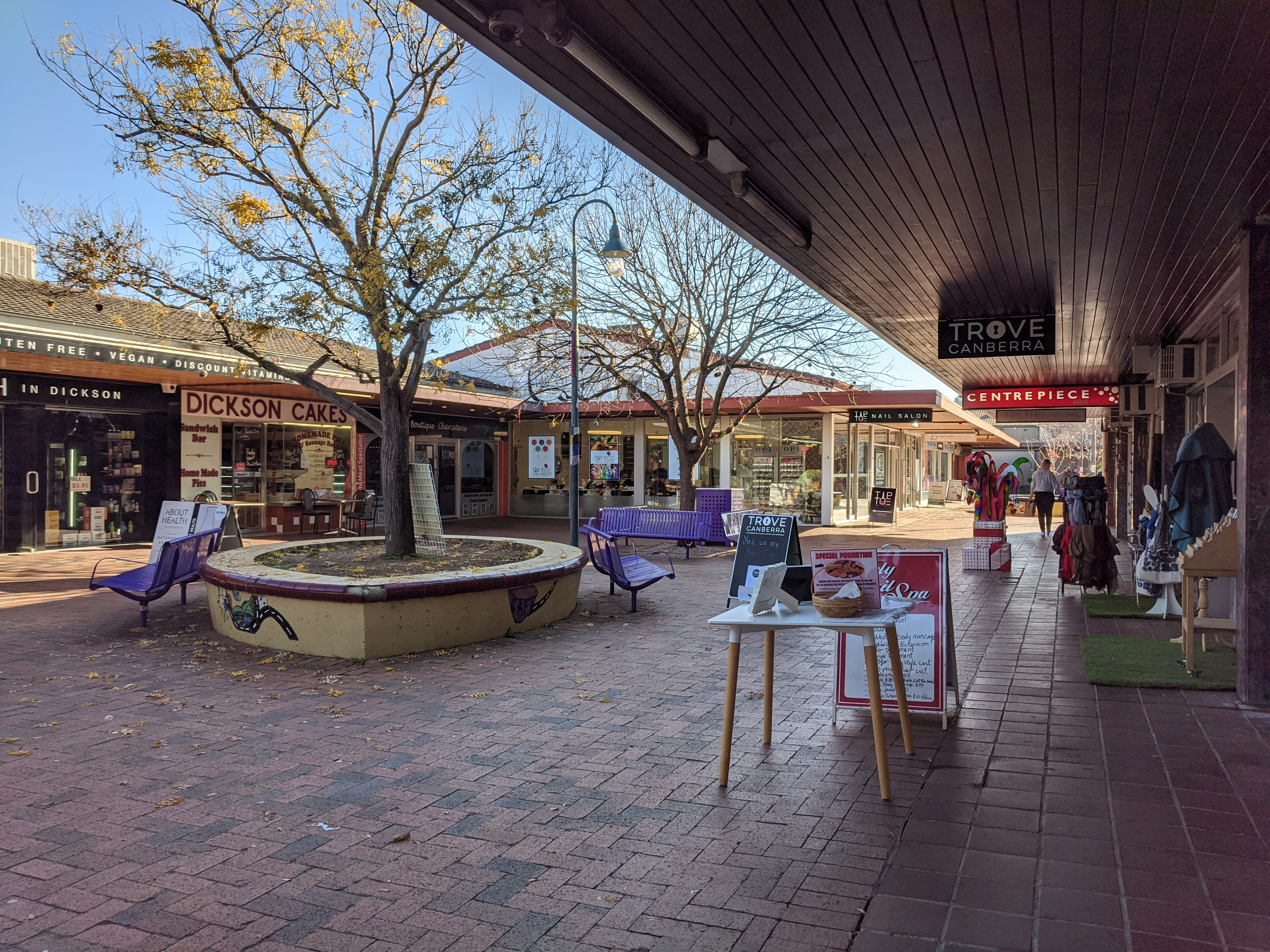
The Centre contains a paved pedestrian area with a number of shops and offices

The Dickson Centre, located in the suburb of Dickson, is a group centre in the inner northern suburbs of Canberra.

The centre is the main commercial centre for the inner northern suburbs, after Civic, and is a significant site of employment. A range of businesses, services and community facilities are located there as well as a private school: Daramalan College.

== Location ==
Dickson Centre is located approximately 4 km north of Civic near Northbourne Avenue at the northern end of the suburb of Dickson. It lies on the southern side of Antill Street and is bounded on the eastern side by Cowper Street, the southern side by the Sullivans Creek stormwater channel and associated parkland, and on the western side by Challis Street.

== Description ==
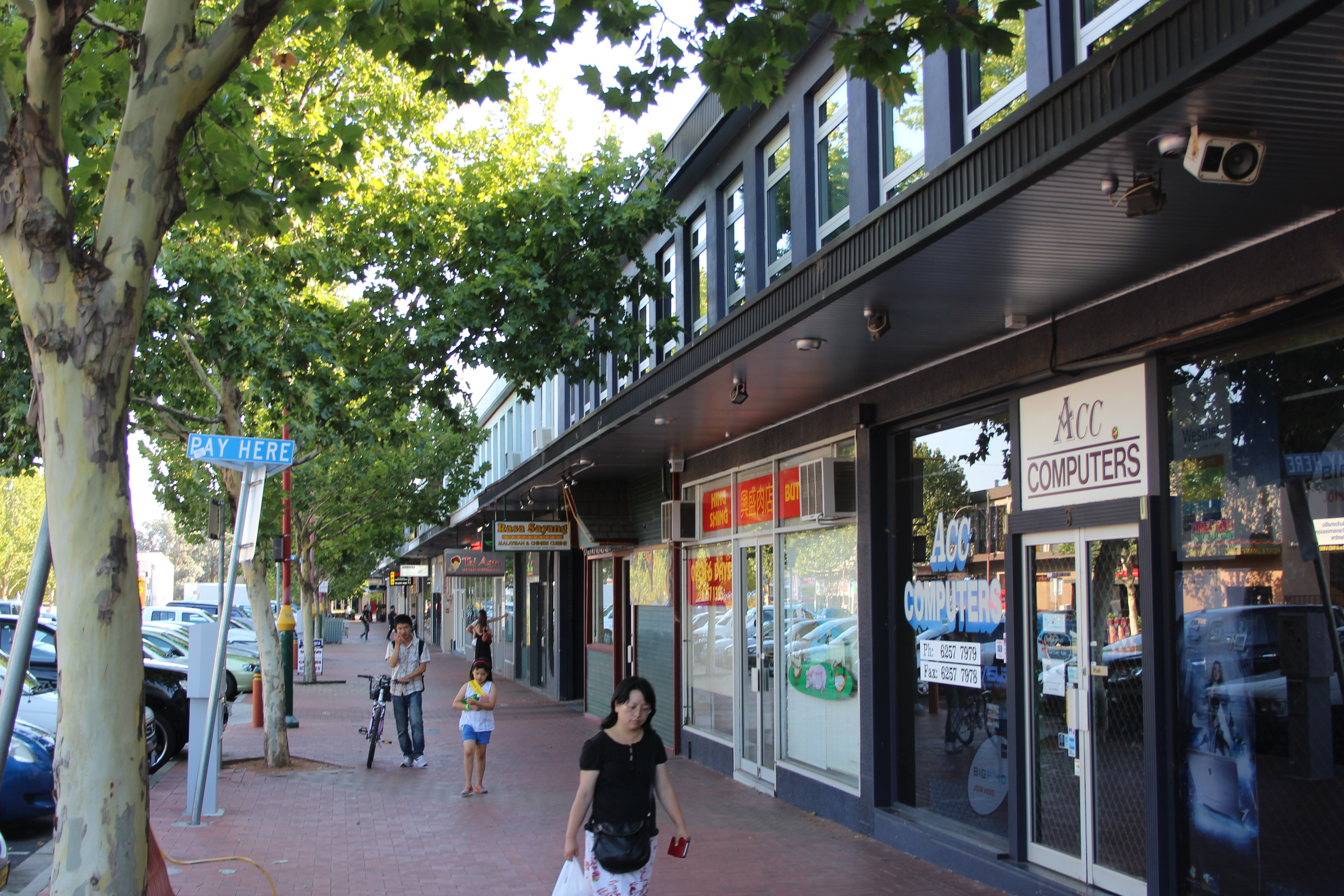
The "Chinatown" restaurant area of the Dickson Centre

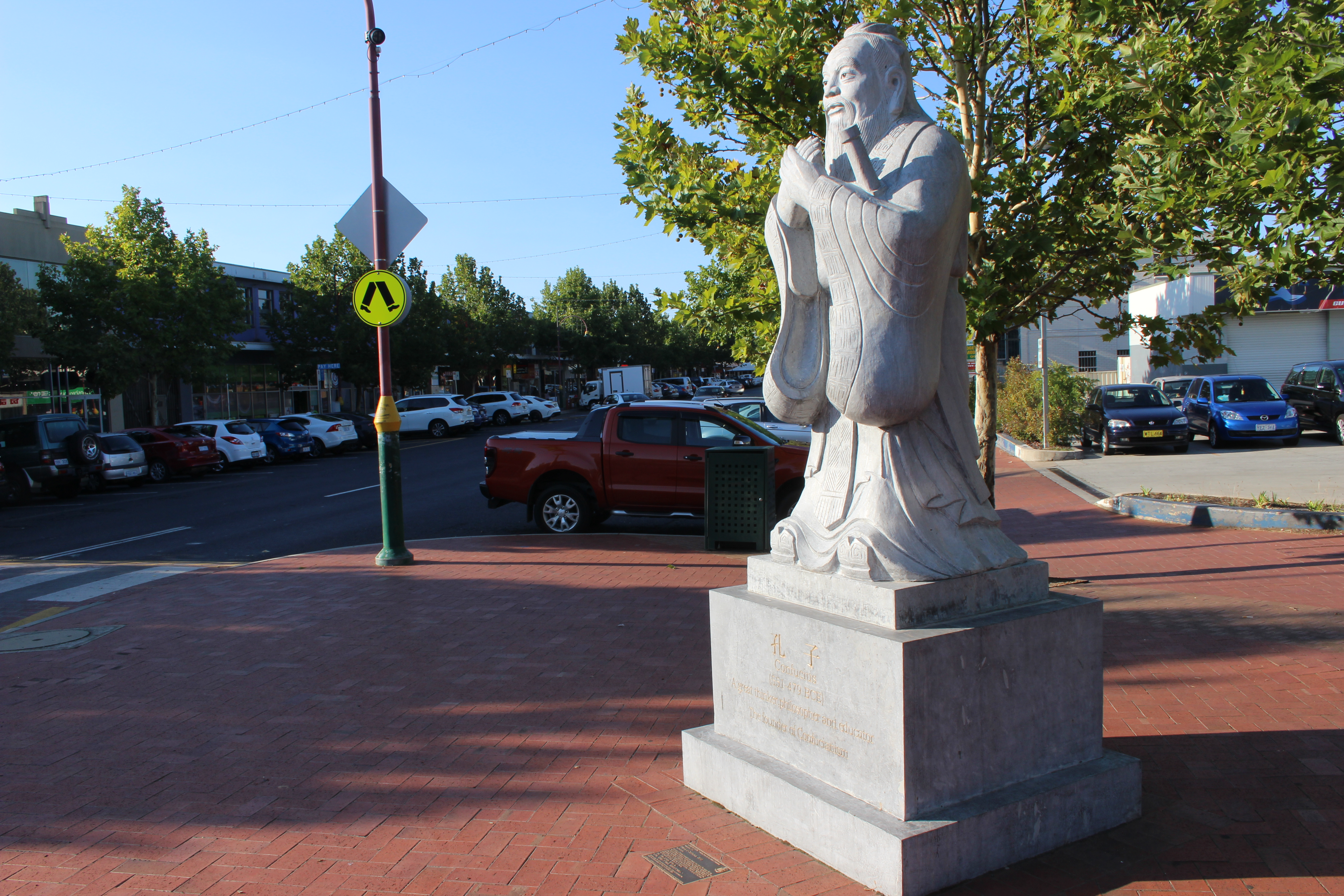
Statue of Confucius in Woolley St

Dickson Centre is the largest group centre in Canberra. It is structured as an outdoor pedestrian area with a ‘village square’ feel, without a mall or arcades. There is a broad range of community facilities, restaurants, cafés, shops and offices.

The central area around Woolley Street is often referred to as Canberra's Chinatown, which includes Indian, Korean, Japanese and South-East Asian restaurants as well as Chinese restaurants, a Chinese butcher, Asian supermarkets and fresh Asian grocery stores.

Community facilities within the Centre include: the post office, Inner North Walk-In Centre (an ACT health clinic staffed by nurses), Dickson Library, Northside Fitness Centre (a private gym) and Dickson Baptist Church. Nearby community facilities include: Dickson Pool, Majura Tennis Club, Northside Community Services, Majura playing fields, St Brigid's Catholic Church and an ACT Ambulance Service station, which serves the inner northern suburbs.

Immediately west of the Centre, between Northbourne Avenue and Challis Street, hosts large office buildings and multi-storey apartments with ground floor tenancies known as the DKSN complex. Services include: Telstra’s regional headquarters; TransACT; Canberra Imaging Group at 484 Northbourne; an ACT Government shopfront at 480 Northbourne; and Dickson Interchange, which accommodates bus and light rail services.

Services inside the Centre include: Westpac and St George banks (Commonwealth, NAB, and ANZ branches have closed); Dickson newsagency; several dentists and pharmacies; medical centres; two physiotherapy clinics; a podiatrist; several automotive repairers; and small offices such as real estate agents and accountants. The Centre also hosts many major national and international brands and franchises such as: Woolworths, Coles, McDonald's, Ampol, Shell, KFC, Subway, Zambrero, and Domino's Pizza.

Night venues include a variety of restaurants along Woolley, Cape, Badham and Challis Streets; Dickson Taphouse pub; The Tradies (The Canberra Tradesman's Union Club); and Canberra Wine House.

Daytime meeting places and cafés include: Highroad, Hudson's, My Rainbow Dreams, Nicky's, Praga, Trev's, Dickson Library and The Tradies Club.

== Changes ==
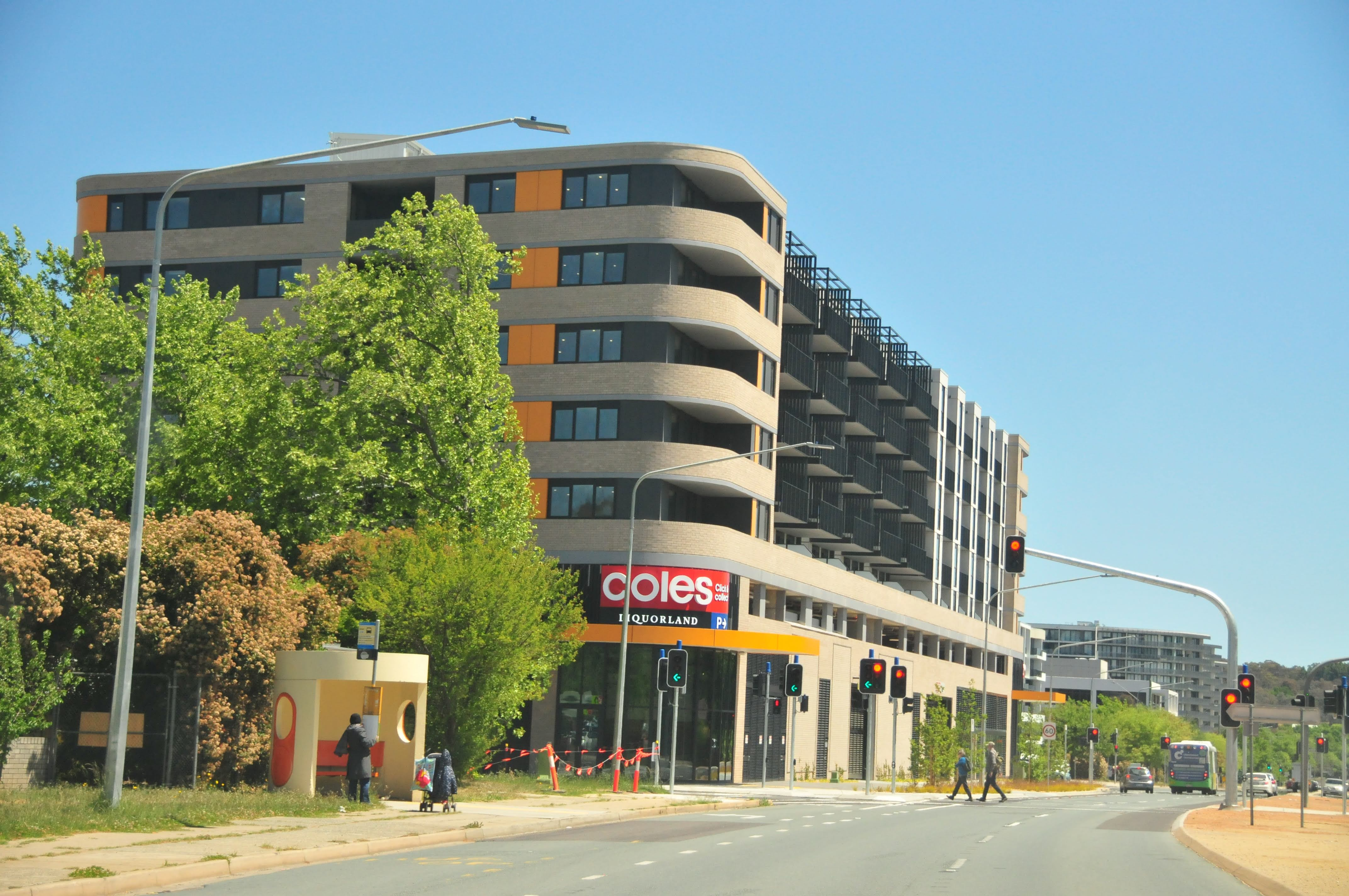
Mixed-use complex featuring 140 apartments and a Coles Supermarket

Zoning changes adopted as a result of the 2011 Dickson Centre Master Plan, permit new buildings up to 12 metres (three storeys) high on the parking areas in Section 30 around the shopping centre, except for an area next to Antill Street where 24 metre high buildings are permitted. In the area to its west and south (north of Sullivans Creek and east of Challis Street, including the Woolley St area), 21 metre (six storey) high buildings are permitted. A new Coles and 140 apartments opened in September 2023 on the former public carpark north of Woolworths supermarket.

Several roads in the Centre were re-named in 2023 to recognise the significant contributions made by local women: Joan Kellett Way (where the east-west road passes between Dickson Baptist Church and the Inner North Walk-In Centre); and Hanna Enders Lane (the section of one-way road that travels east past McDonald's and turns north past Dickson Library toward Antill Street).

The forecourt of Dickson Library has also been given a legal place name for the first time: Taglietti Square, in honour of the library's famous Italian-Australian architect Enrico Taglietti.

== Transport ==
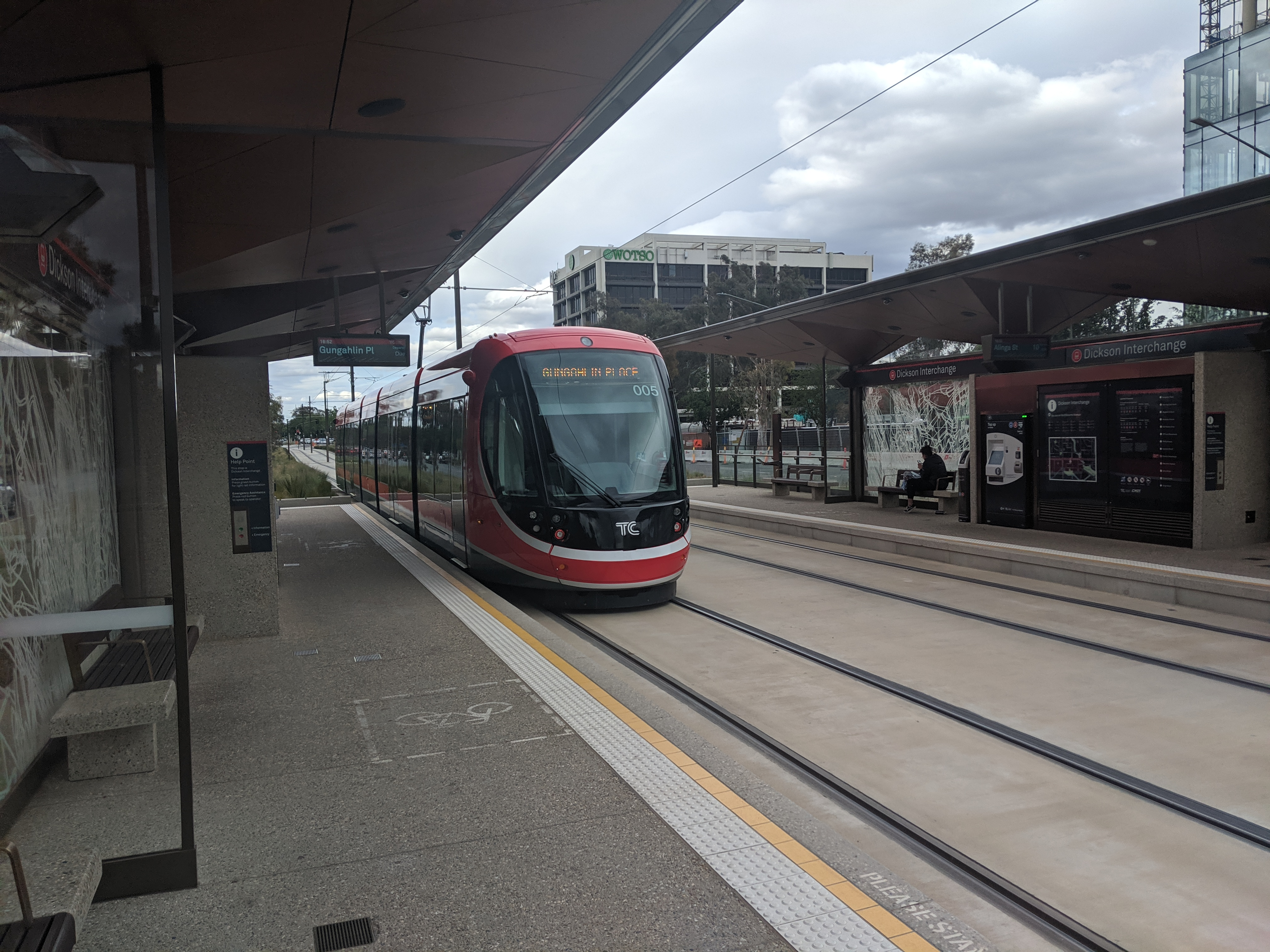
Dickson Interchange in November 2019

Opened in April 2019, Canberra’s light rail line runs along Northbourne Avenue and stops at Dickson Interchange, which is the third busiest stop on the line. This interchange also serves the Centre with buses running to surrounding suburbs as well as further afield to Civic and Belconnen.

Dickson Centre is located near the corner of two major roads - Antill Street and Northbourne Avenue, both of which bound the suburb of Dickson to the north and west respectively. These roads also intersect with Mouat Street, a major route to suburbs in northern Belconnen.

== Canberra's original Aerodrome (1924-1926) ==
The area that became Dickson shopping centre, suburban streets and playing fields was Canberra's first Aerodrome in the early history of Canberra. A former plaque on the front of Dickson Library was removed in 2021 because of errors, and replaced by a Canberra Tracks sign on the lawn outside Dickson Baptist Church. The sign describes the ACT's first fatal aviation disaster, which occurred just north of the library between Antill and Blacket Streets in Downer in 1926.
