= City Interchange =

Central station in Canberra, Australia

Coordinates: 35.2785°S 149.1306°E

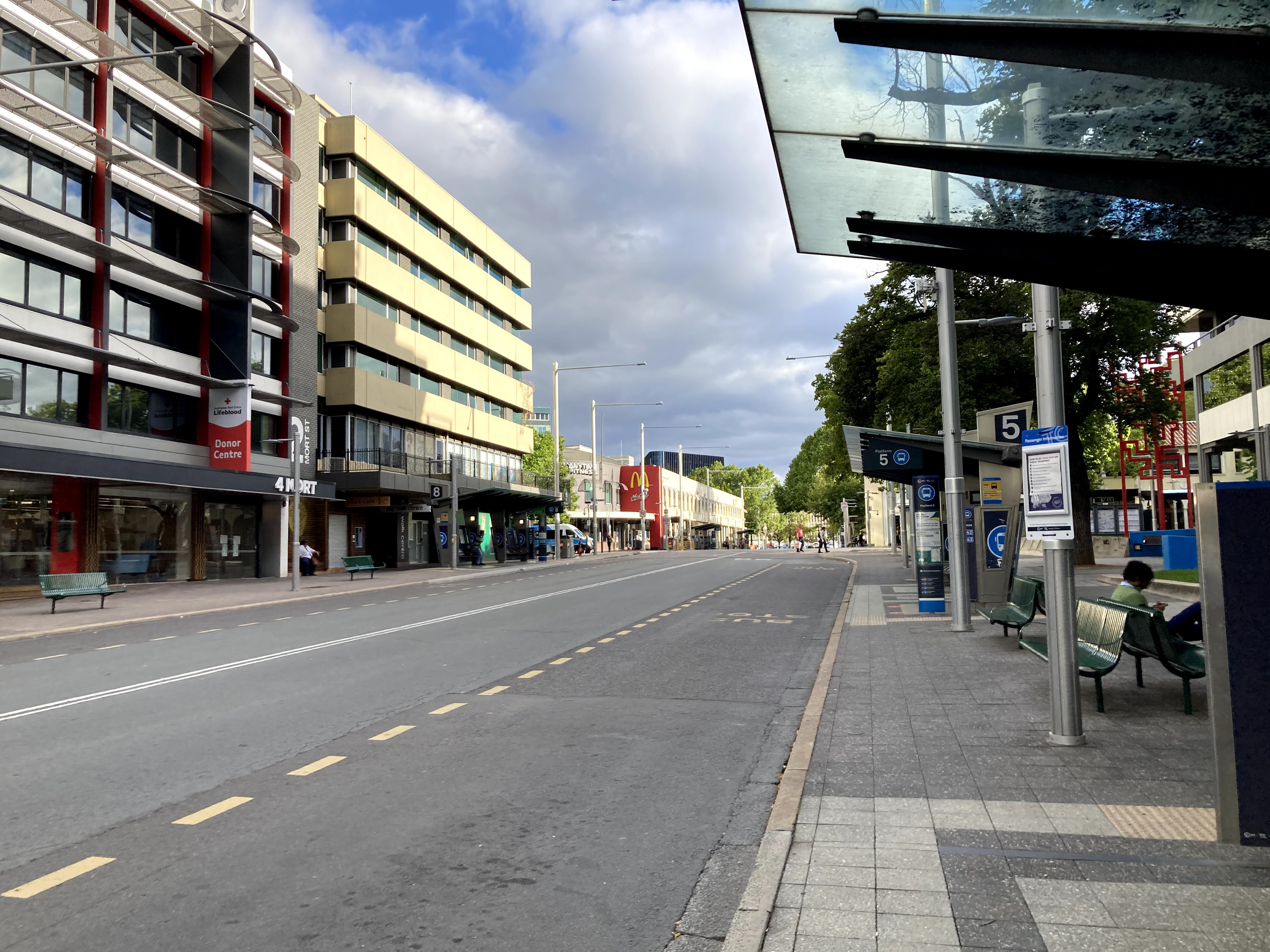
- City Interchange in February 2021

General information
- Location: Alinga Street, Civic, Australian Capital Territory
- Owner: Transport Canberra
- Operator: Transport Canberra
- Bus stands: 12
- Bus operators: ACTION; CDC Canberra
- Connections: Light rail from Alinga Street

History
- Opened: 23 November 1982
Location

City Interchange, formerly City Bus Station is located in the central business district of Canberra. It is a major connecting point for Transport Canberra services across the ACT, as well as commuter bus services to surrounding areas in New South Wales. Bus stands are located on Alinga Street, East Row and Mort Street, while light rail platforms are located in the median on Northbourne Avenue. The Jolimont Centre, which serves as a station for long-distance, interstate coach services is located to the west of Northbourne Avenue, within easy walking distance of all stands and platforms.

== History ==
Construction began in January 1982 with the station opening on 23 November 1982 replacing a temporary stabling facility on the Jolimont Centre site. Buses had previously stopped in Northbourne Avenue and London Circuit, but these stops were not separated from general traffic.

Initially only served by ACTION, from January 1999 Deane's Buslines (now CDC Canberra) and Transborder Express began providing services. Having been named City Bus Station since it opened, in April 2019 it was renamed City Interchange coinciding with the opening of stage 1 of Canberra's light rail network.

== Services ==
City Interchange is currently served by the following routes:

| Service | Destination | Notes |
Platform 1
| R2 | Fraser West | via Belconnen, Kippax Centre |
| R3 | Spence Terminus | via Belconnen, Florey |
| R4 | Belconnen |
Platform 2
| R2 | Canberra Outlet Centre | via Barton |
| R6 | Woden Interchange | via Barton, Kingston, Manuka, Narrabundah College, Canberra Hospital |
| R7 | Chapman | via Cooleman Court |
| R10 | Denman Prospect |
Platform 3
| R5 | City ANU |
| R6 | City ANU |
| R7 | City ANU |
| R10 | City ANU |
Platform 4
| R3 | Canberra Airport | via Russell Offices |
| R4 | Tuggeranong Interchange | via Woden Interchange |
| R5 | Lanyon Marketplace | via Woden Interchange, Erindale Centre, Calwell |
Platform 5 - Transborder Express regional services
| 981 | Yass | via Hall, Murrumbateman |
| 982 | Yass | via Belconnen, Hall, Murrumbateman |
Platform 6
| 31 | Belconnen | via Braddon, Dickson, Kaleen |
| 53 | Dickson | via Ainslie, Hackett |
Platform 7
| | School services |
Platform 8
| 53 | National Museum |
| 54 | Majura Park | via War Memorial |
| 55 | ADFA | via Reid, Campbell, Russell Offices |
Platform 9
| 180 | Lanyon Marketplace | via Tuggeranong Parkway, Banks |
| 181 | Lanyon Marketplace | via Tuggeranong Parkway, Gordon |
| 182 | Lanyon Marketplace | via Russell Offices, Barton, Monaro Highway, Chisholm, Calwell |
Platform 10 - ACTION and CDC Canberra services
| 56 | Canberra Outlet Centre | via Russell Offices, Barton, Kingston, Manuka, Red Hill, Narrabundah, Fyshwick |
| 57 | Woden Interchange | via Parliament House, Deakin, Yarralumla, Hughes, Garran |
| 58 | Woden Interchange | via Parliament House, Deakin, Curtin |
| 59 | Woden Interchange | via Russell Offices, Barton |
| 830 | Googong | via Queanbeyan |
| 840X | Googong | via Jerrabomberra |
| 844X | Bungendore | via Queanbeyan |
Platform 11
| | Set down only |
Platform 12
| 32 | Belconnen | via Aranda, Cook, Macquarie |
| 50 | Watson | via Turner, O'Connor, Lyneham, Dickson, Downer |
| 51 | Dickson | via Turner, O'Connor, Lyneham |
