= Tilley's =

Café in Lyneham, Canberra, Australia

Coordinates: 35°15′7″S 149°7′27″E

Tilley's Devine Café Gallery

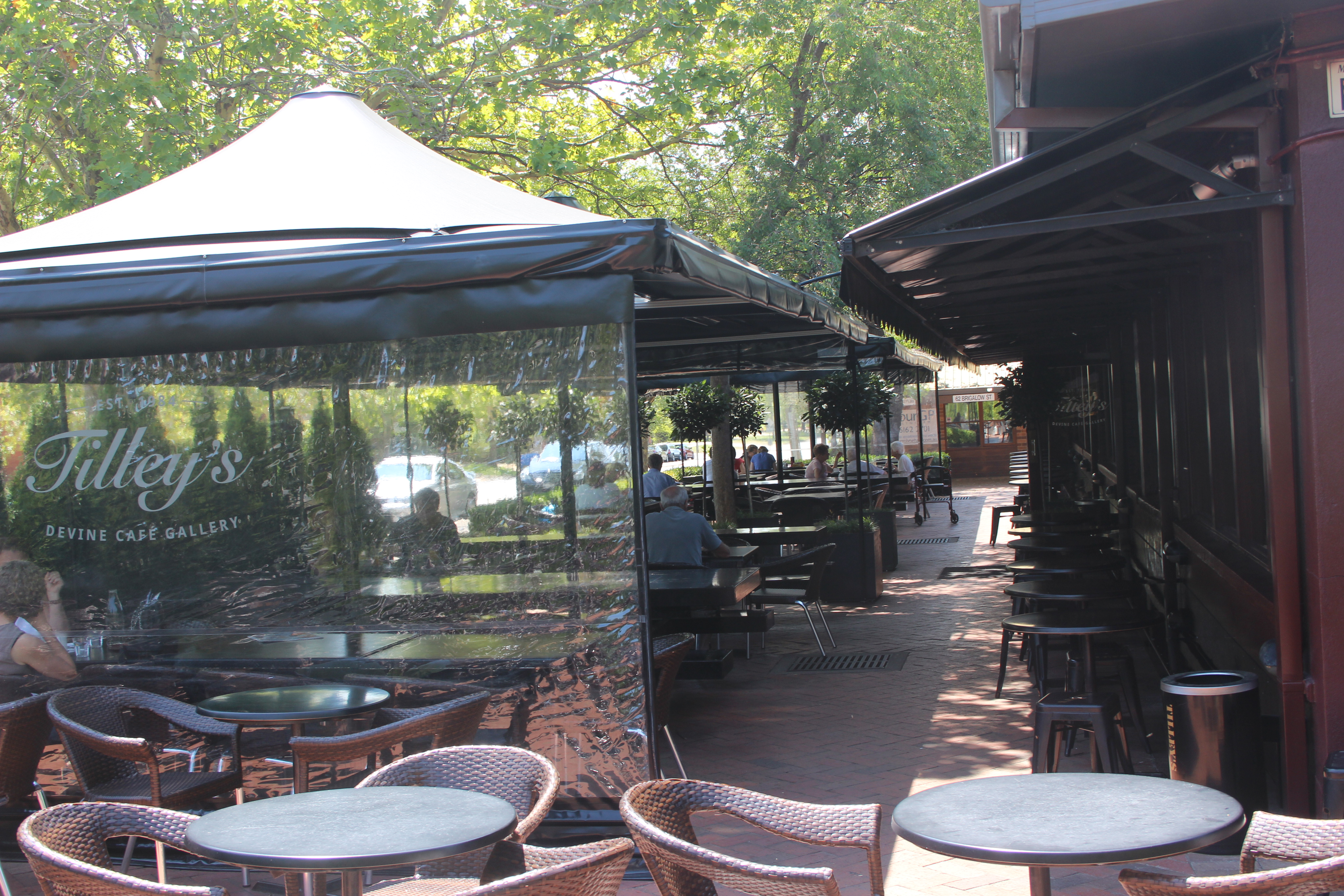
- Founded: 1984
- Founder: Paulie Higgisson
- Area served: Lyneham, Canberra
- Website: tilleys.com.au

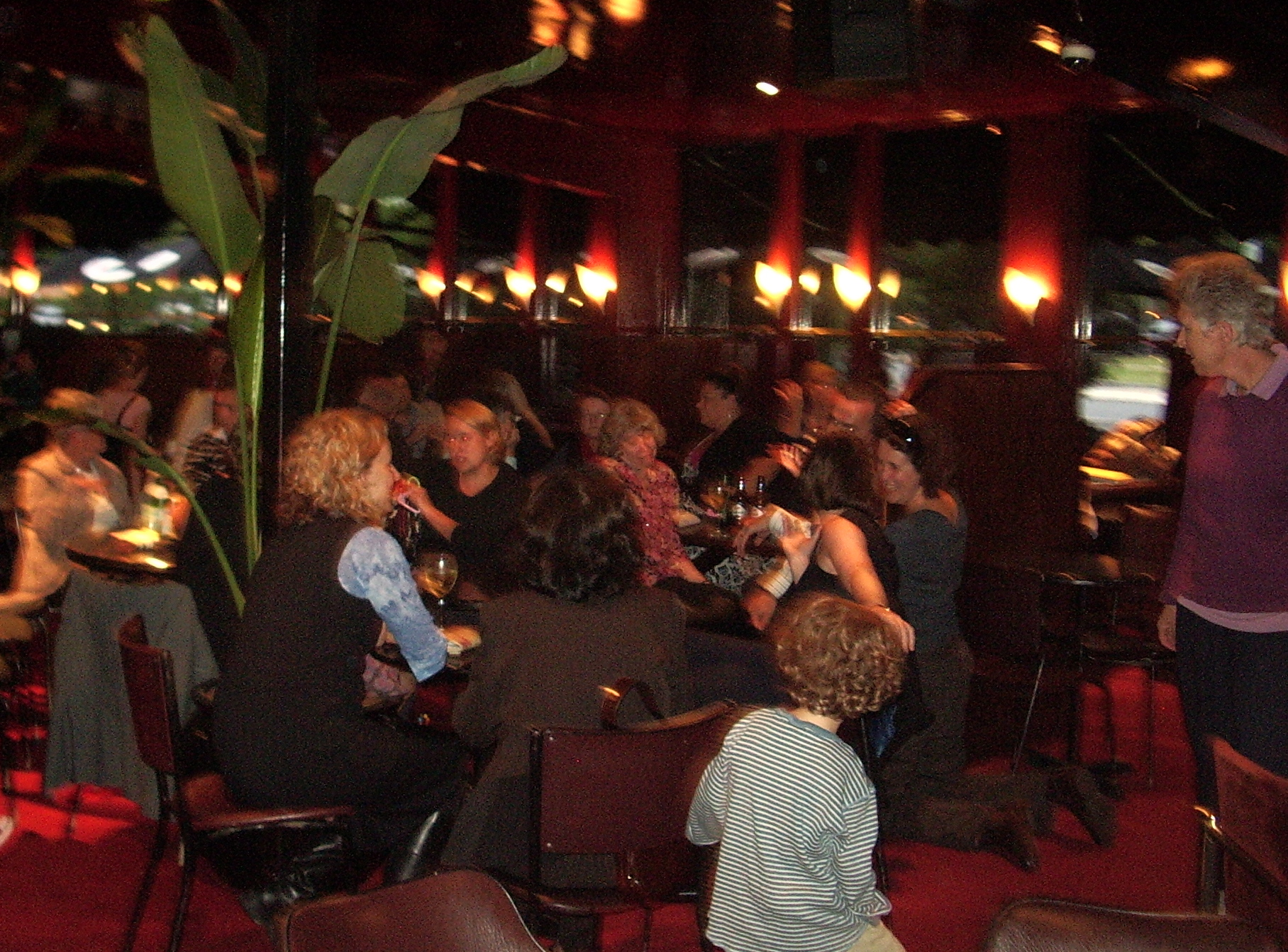
Tilley's by night

Tilley's Devine Café Gallery is a well-known café in the suburb of Lyneham in Canberra, Australia. It was named after Matilda 'Tilly' Devine, an English Australian gangster and madame from Sydney.

When the café first opened in 1984, it was intended as a women's space, with men allowed entry only when accompanied by women. Popular with lesbian women, it quickly became an icon of Canberra's LGBT scene. Attempts to restrict or limit entry of men brought challenges, most notably by a group of cadets from the Royal Military College, Duntroon who attempted to force their way in, instigating a brawl. The policy was maintained for two years.

Tilley's originally had seating for 60, but subsequently expanded five times, and now has large indoor and outdoor eating areas. It was once a popular space for night time concerts by local musicians, hosting names such as Wayne Kelly, Mia Dyson, Frente!, and Clare Bowditch. In 2005 concerts were scaled back in order to expand the more financially viable restaurant and café. According to ACT historian Roslyn Russell, it was the first licensed outdoor venue in Australia, and the first Australian bar to ban smoking indoors.

== See also ==
- Coffee culture in Australia
