= Canberra Racecourse =

Horse racing venue in Canberra, Australia

Canberra
- Location: Lyneham, Australian Capital Territory
- Coordinates: 35°13′55.71″S 149°8′24.39″E
- Owned by: Canberra Racing Club
- Date opened: 1962
- Race type: Flat racing
- Course type: Oval
- Notable races: Black Opal Stakes; Canberra Cup

Canberra Racecourse, also known as Thoroughbred Park, is the major racecourse in Canberra, Australian Capital Territory, Australia. It is located in the suburb of Lyneham, 6 kilometers north of Canberra's central business district.

The Thoroughbred Park turf track proper has a circumference of 1,815 metres (5,955 ft), while the smaller all-weather Acton Track, built in 2004, has a circumference of 1,597 metres (5,240 ft).

The racecourse hosts two major race days. The Black Opal Stakes is Canberra's feature event on the racing calendar, held annually in March, while the Canberra Cup is held annually in November.

== History ==
The Canberra Racing Club was formed in 1925, with the first race meeting conducted at the Acton racetrack, now submerged beneath Lake Burley Griffin. Approval for a new racecourse at the contemporary site was granted in 1950, but racing continued at the Acton racetrack until 1962 when the club moved to its current location in Lyneham. The first meeting at the racecourse was held on 3 November, 1962.

The original grandstand, built in 1962, was demolished and replaced by a new complex in 1987. The following year, during a royal visit to Canberra as part of the bicentennial celebrations, Queen Elizabeth II attended a race meeting at the course and opened the new Queen Elizabeth II Grandstand.

In 2022, the ACT Government released a draft strategy document that proposed options for redeveloping the racecourse for housing, but later distanced themselves from an intention to close the racecourse entirely. In 2024, the ACT Greens announced a plan to compulsorily acquire the racecourse to redevelop it in entirety as a new suburb.

== Transport ==
Transport to and from the course can be found at the nearby EPIC and Racecourse light rail station on the Canberra Metro R1 Civic to Gungahlin line. There is also a taxi rank and parking available on-site.
