= Alinga Street light rail station =

Canberra Metro station

Alinga Street
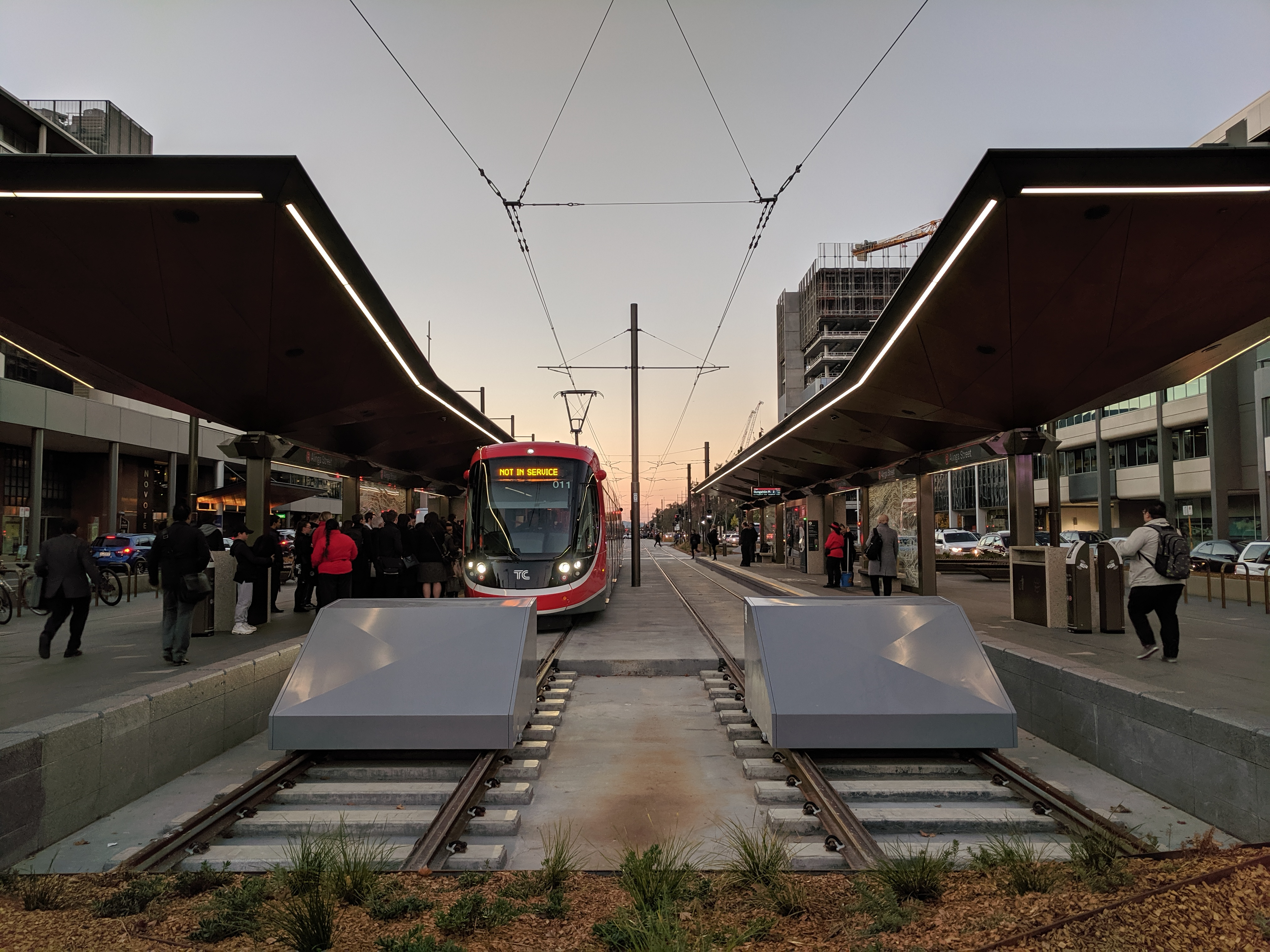

General information
- Location: Alinga Street and Northbourne Avenue, Civic
- Coordinates: 35°16′40″S 149°07′46″E
- Owner: Transport Canberra
- Operator: Transport Canberra
- Line: R1
- Platforms: 2 (side)
- Tracks: 2
- Connections: ACTION and CDC Canberra bus services from City Interchange

Construction
- Structure type: Ground
- Cycle facilities: Yes
- Accessible: Yes

History
- Opened: 20 April 2019

Services
Preceding station	Canberra Metro	Following station
Elouera Street towards Gungahlin Place	R1	Terminus
Location

Alinga Street light rail station is the terminus of the Canberra Metro R1 light rail line. It opened on 20 April 2019. As the main connection point for bus services to Canberra's southern districts as well as to Queanbeyan and Yass, Alinga Street is by far the busiest station on the route, with 37% of all light rail passengers beginning or ending a journey here in the first 10 months of operation.

Alinga street is laid out with two side platforms. This configuration will allow through-running once construction of future lines to Commonwealth Park and Woden Town Centre is complete. Currently only the western platform is used outside of peak times, although a crossover to switch light rail vehicles between tracks allows both to be used simultaneously when demand requires. The station is located immediately adjacent to both City Interchange, providing a convenient transfer to ACTION bus services throughout Canberra as well as some regional services, and the Jolimont Centre for connection to interstate coach services.

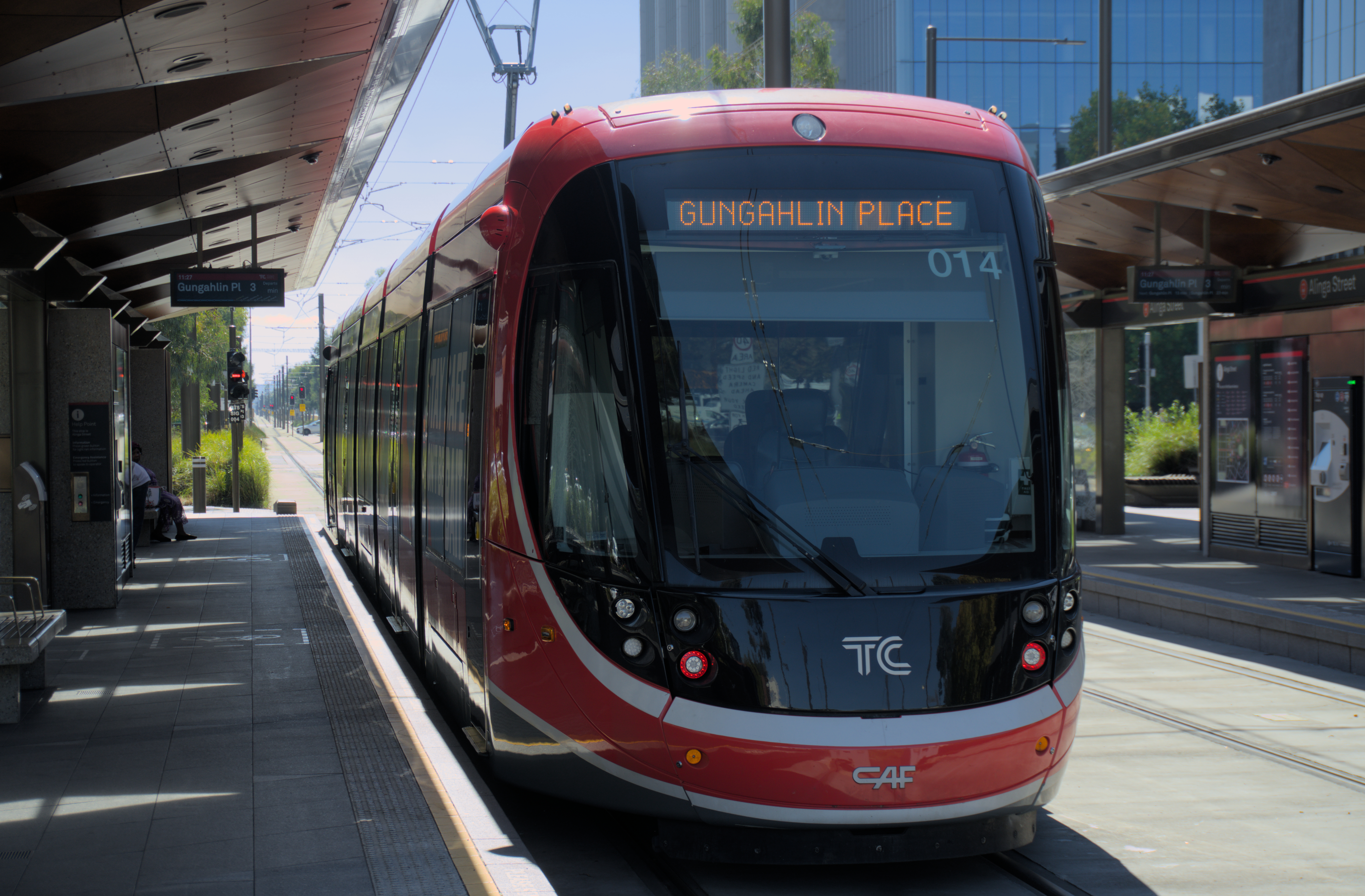
Canberra Metro LRV014 at Alinga Street Station

== Light rail services ==
As the terminus of the line, most light rail services either originate from or terminate at Alinga Street. Most outbound services continue to Gungahlin Place, however on the shoulder of peak hour, some terminate at EPIC and Racecourse when returning to the depot in Mitchell.

Line	Destinations	Notes
R1	Gungahlin Place	
R1	EPIC and Racecourse*, Gungahlin Place	*Limited peak hours services only
