= Lyneham, Australian Capital Territory =

Suburb of Canberra, Australia

Lyneham
- Suburb
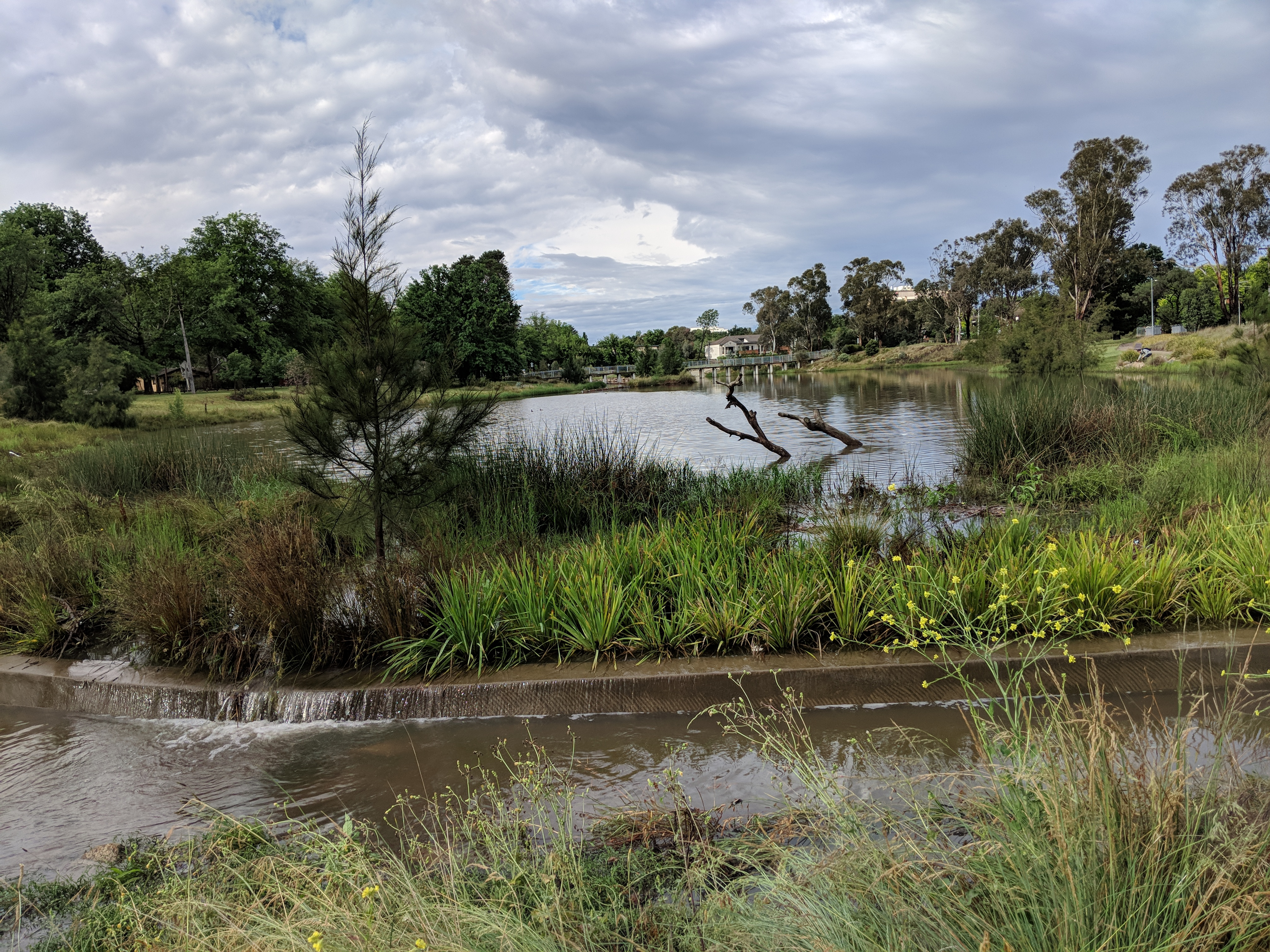
- Lyneham wetlands c. 2017

- Interactive map of Lyneham
- Coordinates: 35°15′0″S 149°07′45″E
- Country: Australia
- State: Australian Capital Territory
- City: Canberra
- District: North Canberra
- Location: 4 km (2.5 mi) N of Canberra CBD; 19 km (12 mi) NW of Queanbeyan; 86 km (53 mi) SW of Goulburn; 283 km (176 mi) SW of Sydney
- Established: 1928

Government
  - Territory electorate: Kurrajong
  - Federal division: Canberra

Area
  - Total: 5.5 km^{2} (2.1 sq mi)
- Elevation: 575 m (1,886 ft)

Population
  - Total: 5,703 (2021 census)
  - Density: 1,037/km^{2} (2,686/sq mi)
- Postcode: 2602
Suburbs around Lyneham
Kaleen	Mitchell	Downer, Watson
O'Connor	Lyneham	Dickson
O'Connor	Turner	Braddon

Lyneham (/laɪnəm/) is a suburb of Canberra, Australia in the North Canberra district. It is named after Sir William Lyne, premier of New South Wales from 1899 to 1901. The suburb name was gazetted in 1928, but development did not commence until 1958. The streets of Lyneham are named after artists and people associated with the development of early Canberra.

== Points of interest ==
Lyneham has many attractions including nature parks and bushland, proximity to the centre of Canberra, the Old Canberra Inn (the earliest licensed pub in Canberra), Tilley's Devine Cafe and Gallery, and a number of sporting facilities. Also located in Lyneham is Exhibition Park in Canberra (EPIC), which annually hosts Australia's best known car festival, Summernats, the Royal Canberra Show and the National Folk Festival.

St Ninian's Uniting Church in Brigalow Street is the second-oldest church in Canberra, opened in 1873. It was founded as a Presbyterian Church by the Scottish community, many of whom had come to the area as shepherds. It has been heritage-listed by the ACT Heritage Council. The Sakyamuni Buddhist Centre, also known as Van Hanh Temple, is a large Vietnamese Buddhist temple located on Archibald St.

== Character ==
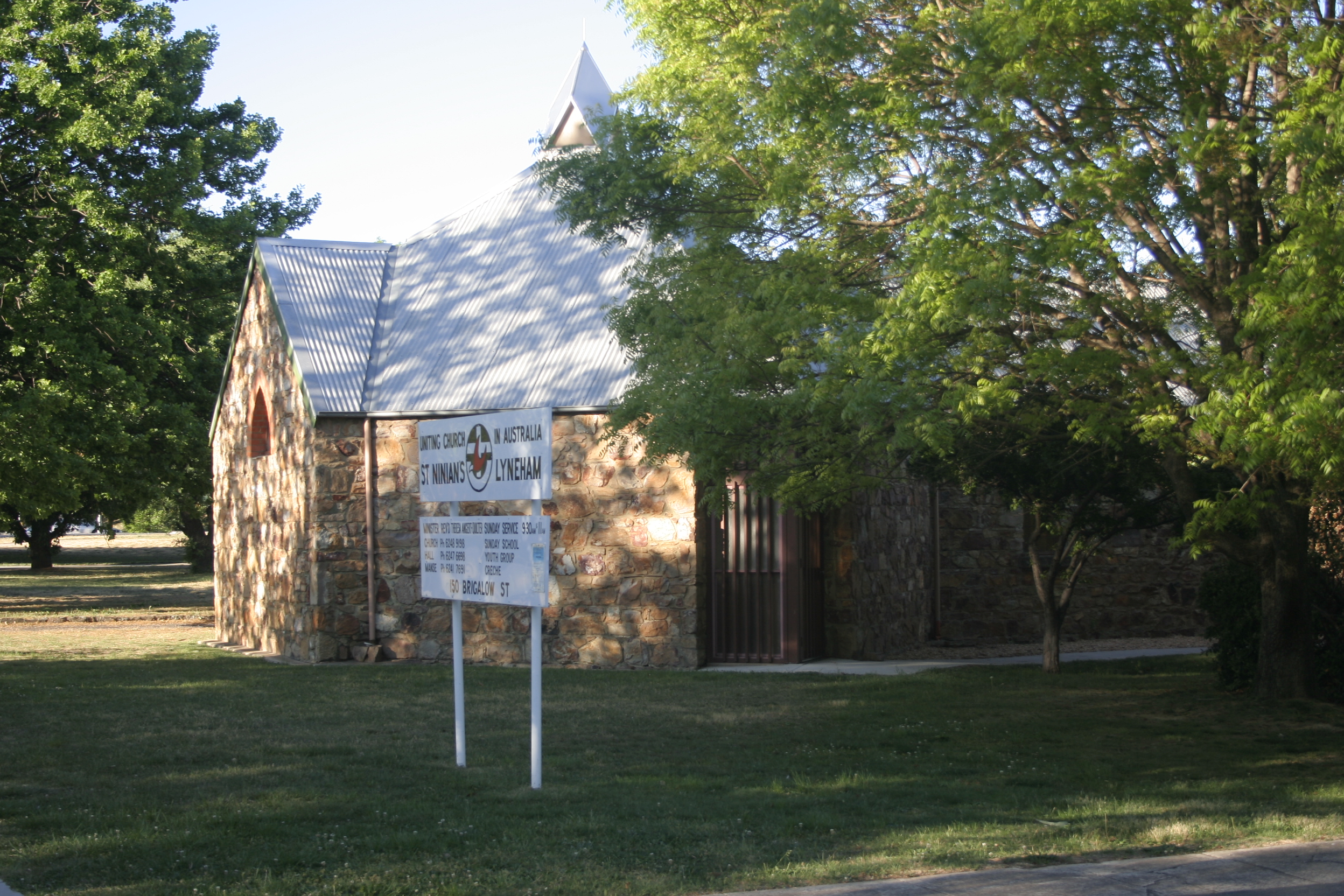
St Ninian's Church, Canberra's second-oldest church

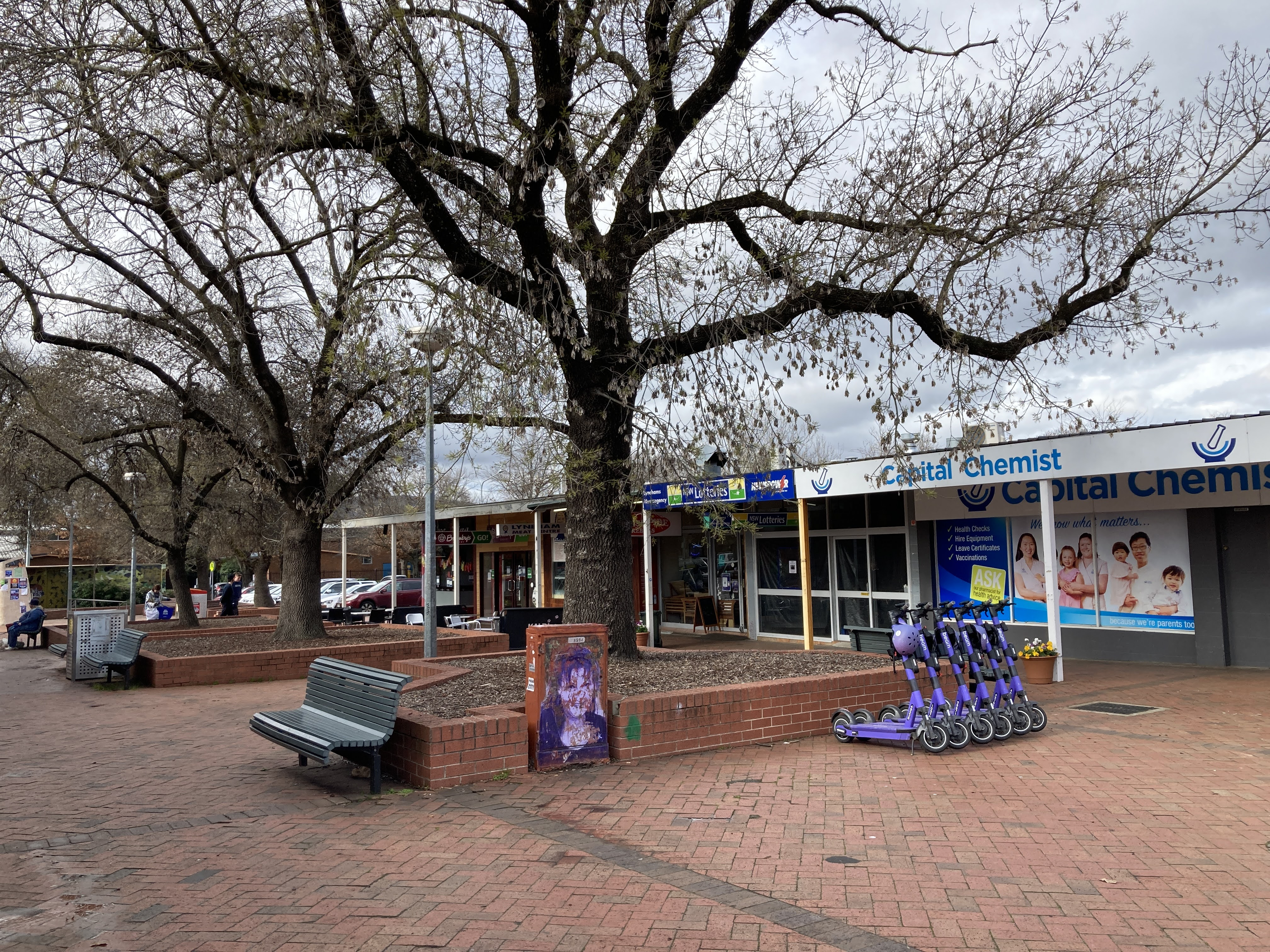
Lyneham shops

The style of the suburb has been evolving since development commenced in 1958 at the north-western periphery of what is now 'inner' Canberra. The older homes built in 1958-59 (many of which catered to the sizeable influx of Commonwealth public servants' families, who were being relocated with their respective Departments' headquarters from Melbourne), now sit beside modern townhouse developments, while individual blocks are being 'gentrified' by either extensive renovation or demolition and rebuilt homes. Having mainly been substantially established since the 1960s, Lyneham residents enjoy its leafy streets and established gardens. A scenic wetland was built adjacent to Sullivans Creek in Lyneham to improve downstream water quality. It was opened to the public in April 2012 and it is frequented by wood ducks.

Many of the single houses between Sullivans Creek and Northbourne Avenue have been replaced by two and three-storey flats in recent years. Land adjoining Northbourne Avenue is now zoned to permit redevelopment with 25-metre (about 8 storeys) high flats or 32 metres (about 11 storeys) at the corners of Mouat Street and Macarthur Avenue with Northbourne Avenue and the first such flats were completed on the site of a two-storey motel on the corner of Northbourne Ave and Mouat St in 2013.

=== North Lyneham ===
The residential part of Lyneham built to the north of Ginninderra Drive having been developed in the mid to late 1980s was a relatively recent addition to the original suburban homes of 1960s' Lyneham. The original residences on "old" Lyneham, contained within the area bounded by Wattle, Dryandra, Archibald and Mouat Streets and Northbourne Avenue mainly date back to the late 1950s. North Lyneham's main feeder road, Cossington Smith Crescent, loops through the area with other streets coming off it. North Lyneham also has a small shopping centre housing shops, a couple of restaurants and a number of small businesses. North Lyneham backs onto a bush reserve which separates it from the Belconnnen suburb of Kaleen. The walking trails in the reserve are popular with the local residents and provide scenic views of the inner northern suburbs of Canberra to the east and south and Belconnen and the Brindabella Ranges to the west.

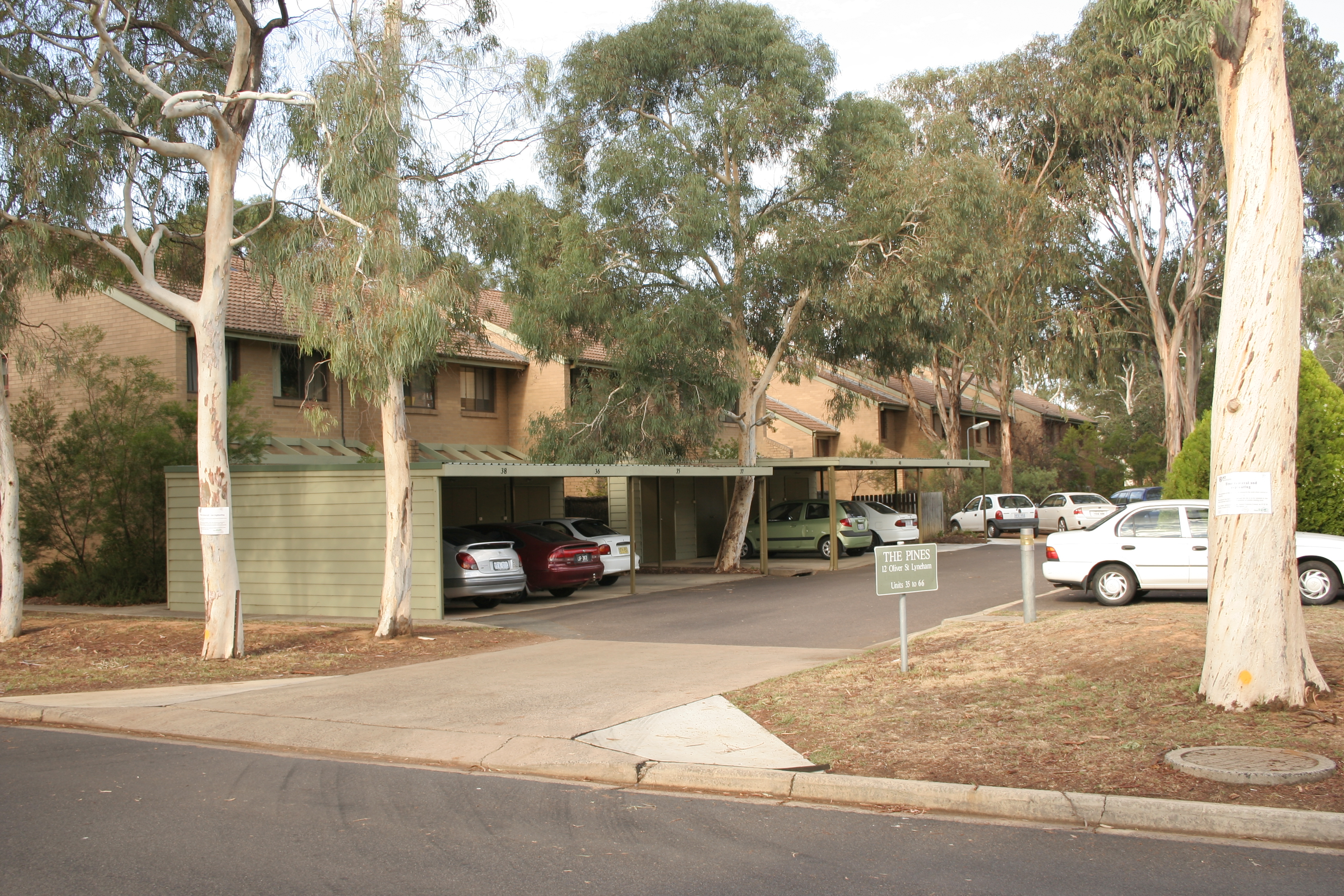
The Pines, townhouses built in the 1980s

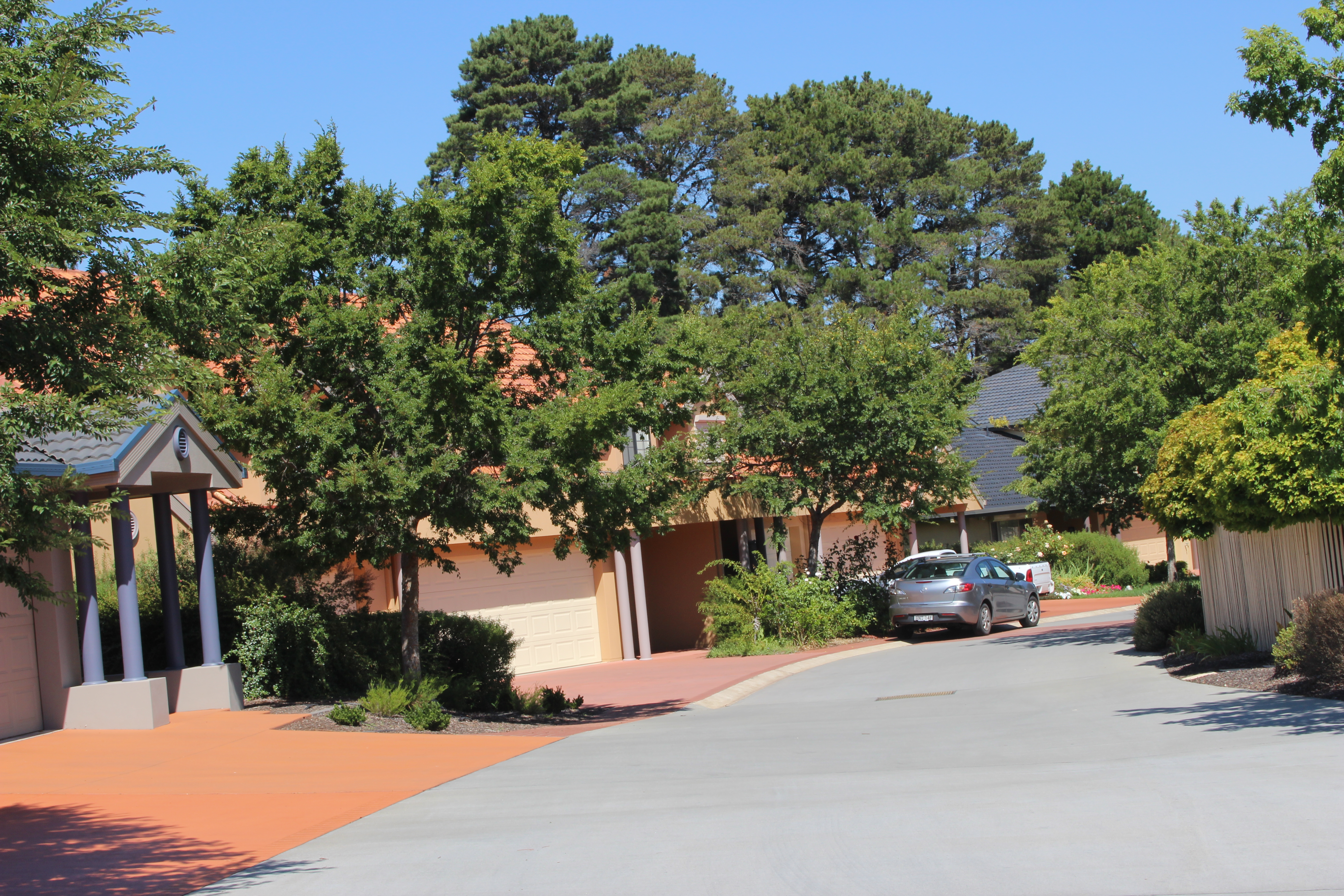
Town houses in the Sanctuary, north Lyneham

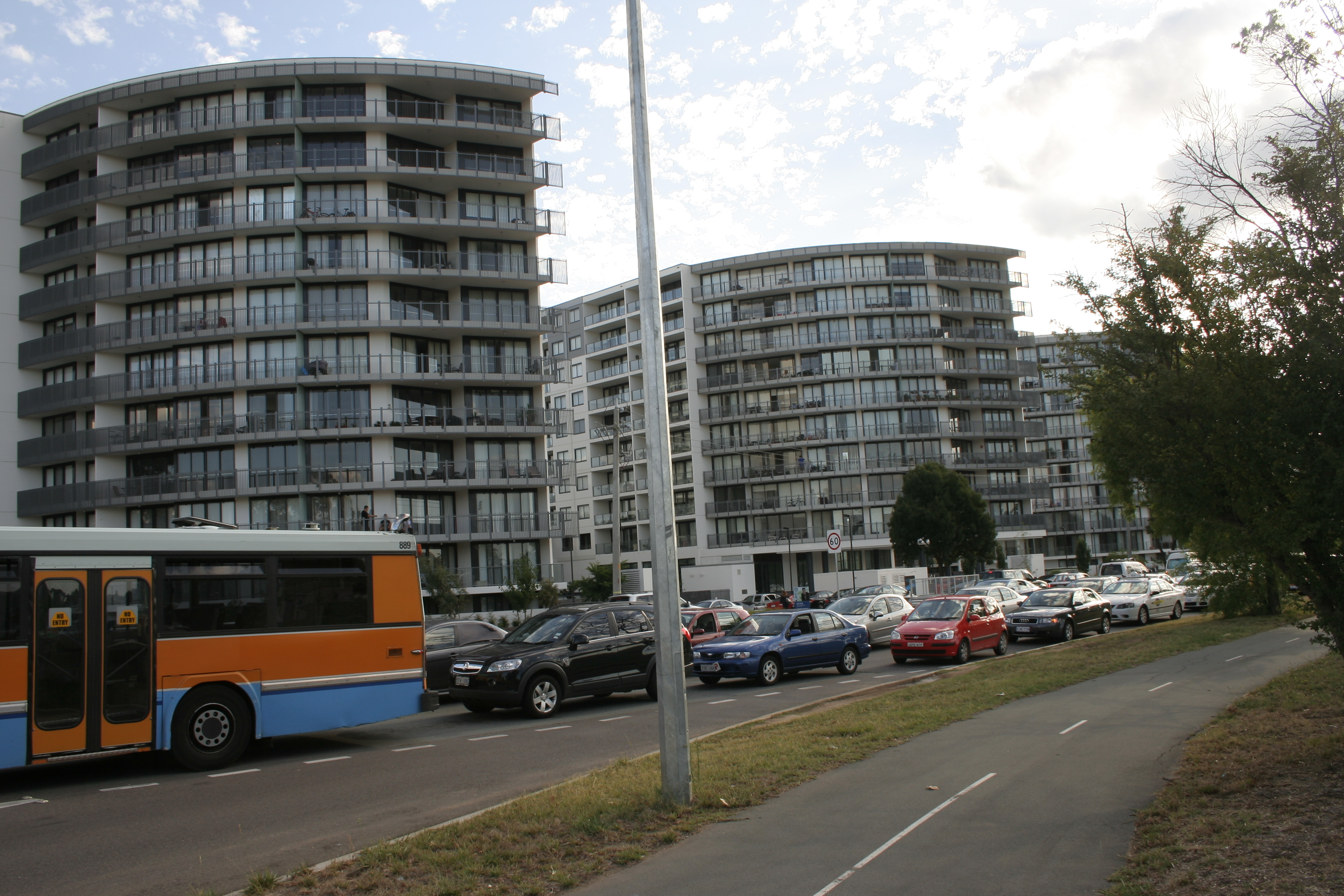
First high-rise flats in Mouat St

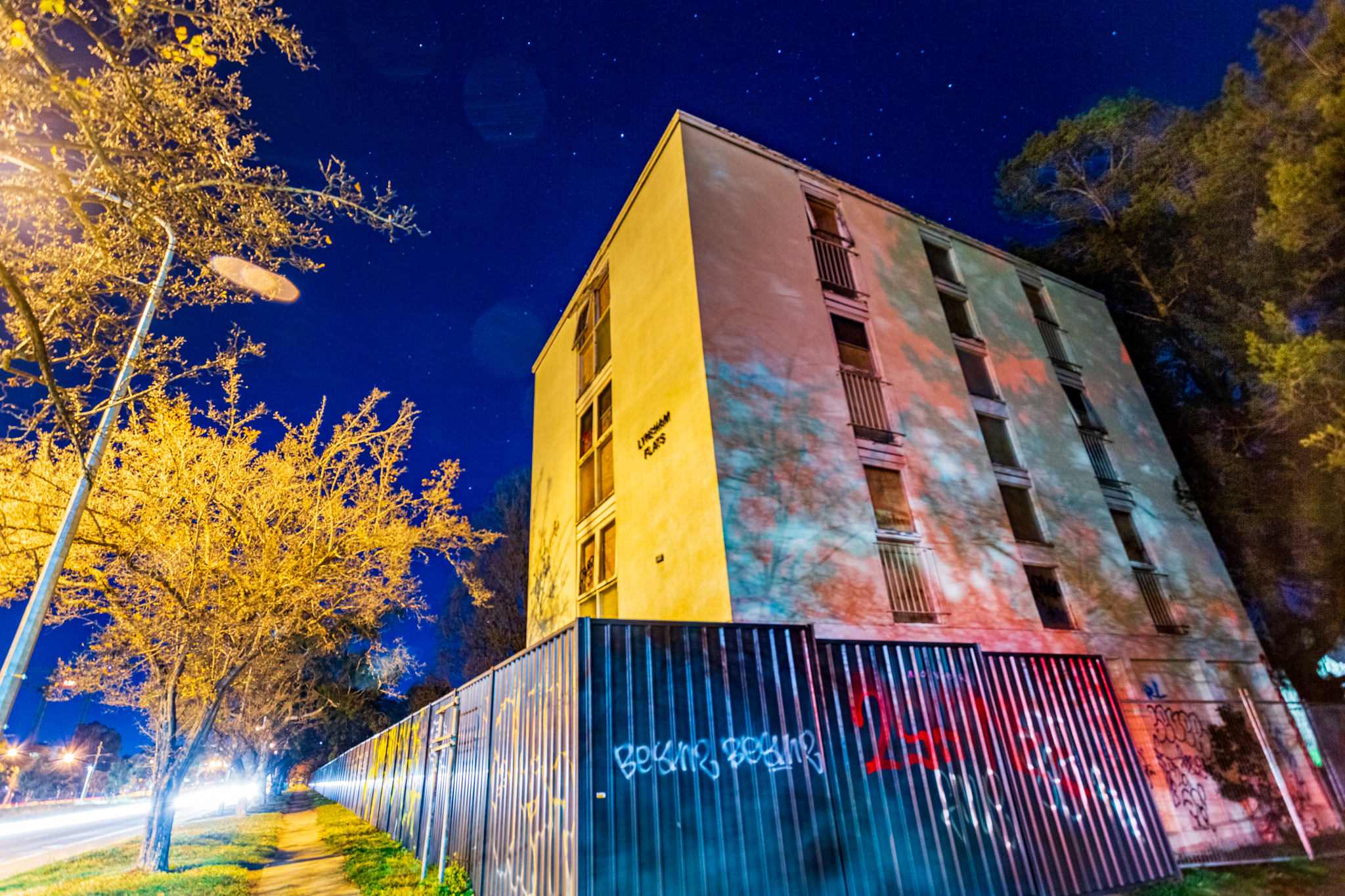
Lyneham Flats on Northbourne Avenue

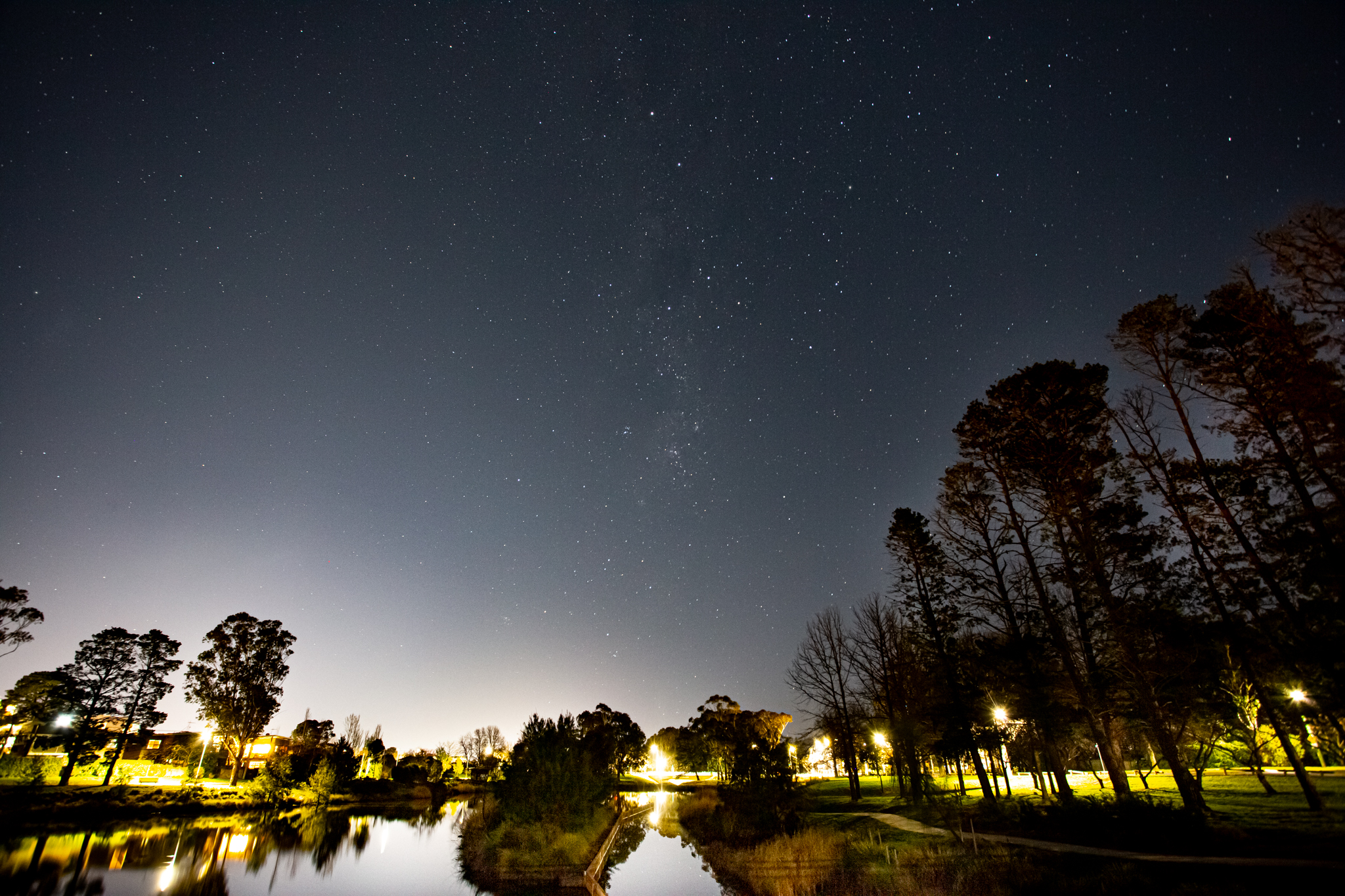
Lyneham Wetlands facing southward at night

== Demographics ==
In the 2021 census, the population of Lyneham was 5,703, including 69 (1.2%) Indigenous persons and 3,517 (61.7%) Australian-born persons. Only 26.8% (36.5% in 2011) of dwellings were separate houses (compared to the Australian average of 72.3%), while 35.9% were semi-detached, row or terrace houses (Australian average: 12.7%) and 36.6% (24.0% in 2011) were flats, units or apartments (Australian average: 14.2%). 37.9% of the population were professionals, compared to the Australian average of 24.0%. Notably 18.3% worked in government administration, compared to the Australian average of 1.1%, although the ACT-wide average is a very similar 17.1%. Lyneham is favoured by students and young adults with 34.5% of its population in the 20- to 34-year-old age group (compared to the Australian average of 20.5%). The suburb has few children under 15: 11.4%, compared to 18.2% Australia-wide. 37.9% of the dwellings are occupied by single person households, compared to the Australian average of 25.6%. 51.6% of the population had no religion, while 12.4% were Catholic, 7.0% not stated, 5.9% Anglican and 4.6% Buddhist.

== Governance ==
2025 federal election
Labor	48.46%
Greens	28.99%
Liberal	10.13%
Independent	10.04%
2024 ACT election
Labor	38.1%
Greens	23.9%
Liberal	15.4%
Independents for Canberra	13.4%

Lyneham is located within the federal electorate of Canberra and it is represented by Alicia Payne for the Labor Party. In the ACT Legislative Assembly, Lyneham is part of the electorate of Kurrajong, which elects five members on the basis of proportional representation, two Labor, one Green, one Liberal and one Independent. Polling place statistics are shown to the right for the Lyneham polling place at Lyneham Primary School in the 2025 federal and 2024 ACT elections. The Lyneham East polling place was also established at Lyneham High School for the 2025 election.

== Education ==
Lyneham is home to Lyneham High School, Lyneham Primary School and Brindabella Christian College Lyneham Campus.

== Transport ==
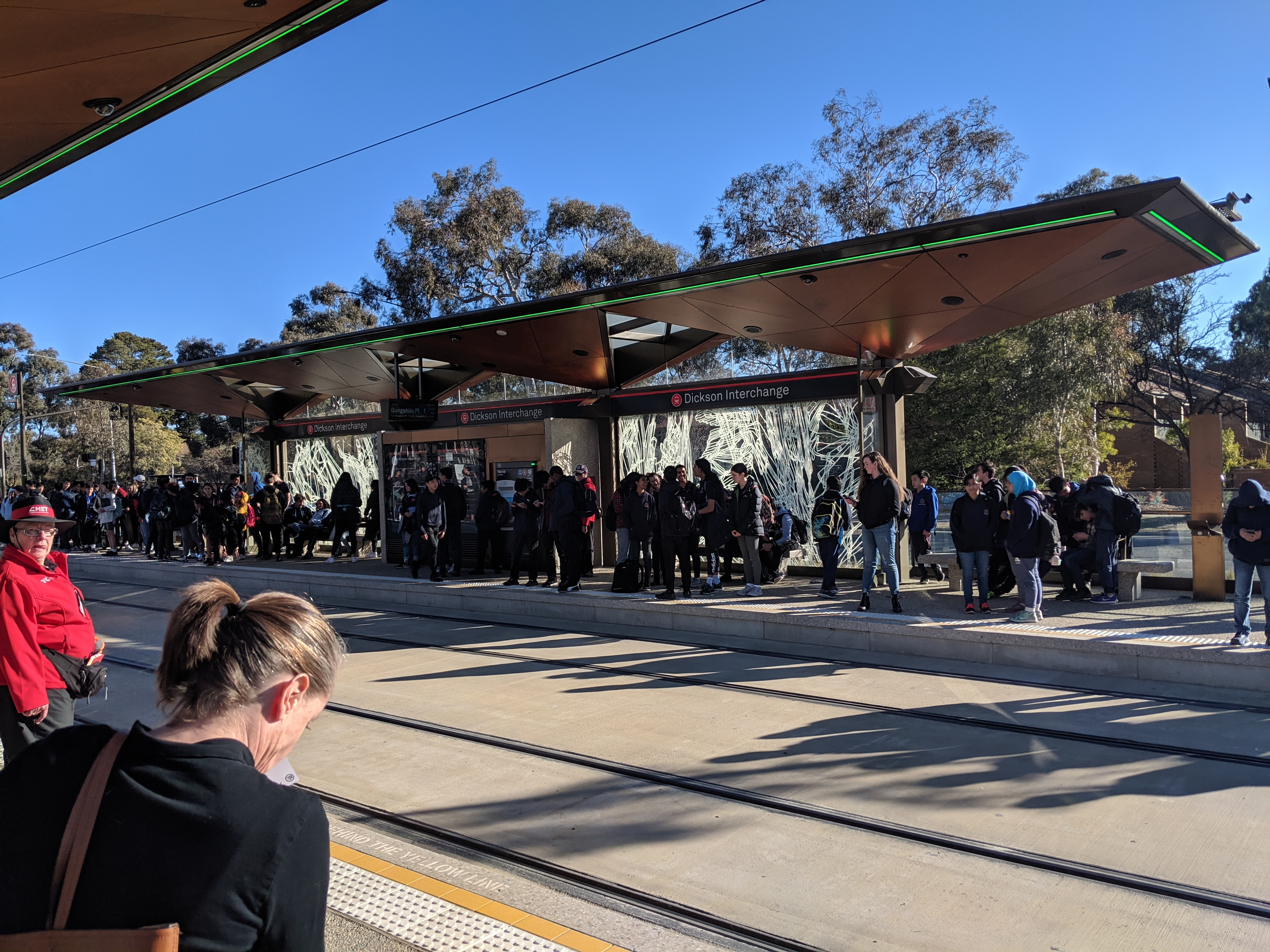
Dickson Interchange

Lyneham is served by five light rail stops: Macarthur Avenue, Dickson Interchange, Swinden Street, Phillip Avenue and EPIC and Racecourse. The first four are located on its eastern edge and only the first two are near the residential areas of Lyneham. It is also served by buses on routes R9, 30, 31, 50 and 51. The Sullivans Creek shared path traverses the suburb and is a busy commuter cycling route.

== Sport ==
Sports facilities within Lyneham include the National Hockey Centre, Thoroughbred Park (Canberra Racecourse), the ACT Netball Centre and Yowani Country Club.

== Geology ==
Silurian calcareous shales from the Canberra Formation is overlain by Quaternary alluvium. This rock is the limestone of the original title of Canberra "Limestone Plains". Greywacke from the Ordovician age Pittman Formation is in the north west.

== External links and references ==
- Connery, Georgina (28 March 2014). "A weekend in your suburb: 36 hours in Lyneham". The Canberra Times. Archived from the original on 3 April 2014.
- Exhibition Park in Canberra
