= Gungahlin Place =

Light rail and bus station in Canberra, Australia

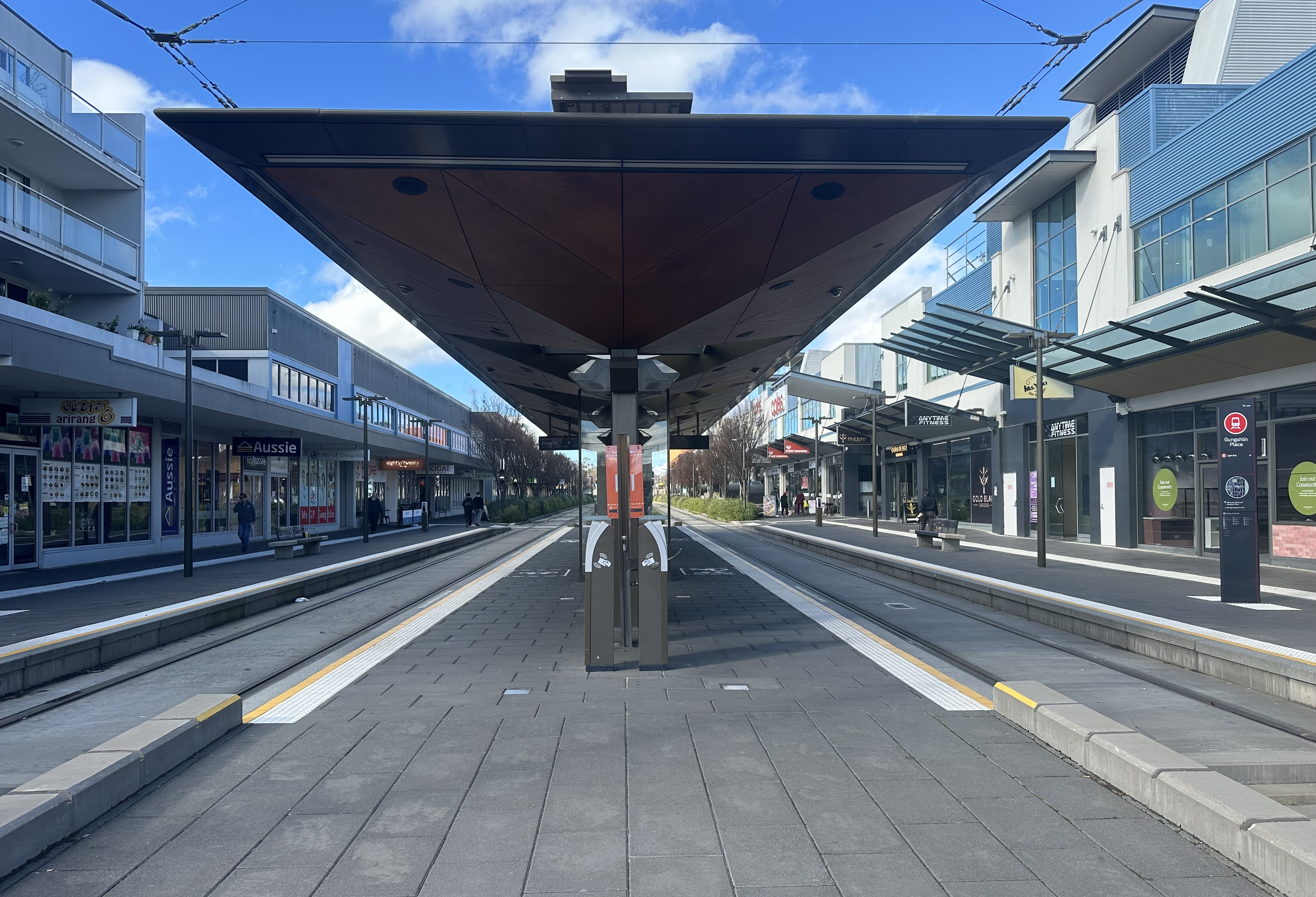
- Gungahlin Place light rail stop in July 2026

General information
- Location: Gungahlin Place, Gungahlin Town Centre
- Coordinates: 35°11′08″S 149°08′07″E
- Operator: Transport Canberra
- Line: R1
- Platforms: 4 (2 bay)
- Tracks: 2
- Connections: ACTION bus services

Construction
- Structure type: Ground
- Cycle facilities: Yes
- Accessible: Yes

History
- Opened: 20 April 2019

Services
| Preceding station | Canberra Metro | Following station |
|---|---|---|
| Terminus | R1 | Manning Clark North towards Alinga Street |
Location

Gungahlin Place is a transport interchange in Gungahlin Town Centre. It is the northern terminus of the Canberra Metro R1 Civic to Gungahlin line and is an important connection point between light rail and bus transport. The current bus interchange opened on 21 April 2018. Despite the station being named Gungahlin Place, the light rail platforms are actually located on a section of Hibberson Street that has been closed to road traffic. Light rail service began in April 2019.

As the northern terminus of Canberra Metro's R1 route, Gungahlin Place is the second busiest light rail station on the network, with 20% of all passengers boarding or alighting a service here in the first 10 months of operation.

== Services ==
=== Light rail ===
The light rail platforms are arranged to allow access to the vehicles from doors on both sides. This allows separation of passengers who are alighting and those waiting to board. During peak times both sets of platforms may be used and there is a crossover to allow arriving or departing light rail vehicles to switch between tracks. On the shoulder of peak hour, some services from Gungahlin Place terminate at Sandford Street when returning to the depot in Mitchell.

| Line | Destinations | Notes |
|---|---|---|
| R1 | Alinga Street | |
| R1 | Sandford Street*, Alinga Street | *Limited peak hours services only |

=== Bus services ===
Gungahlin Place serves as the terminus for the R8 Rapid route between Belconnen and Gungahlin, as well as many local routes, most which operate as bi-directional loops, each connecting several suburbs within the district. There are currently 4 bus platforms in use.

| Route number | Commences | Terminates |
|---|---|---|
| R8 | Belconnen (Cohen Street) | Terminus |
| 18 | Terminus | Gungahlin Place via Franklin, Harrison and Mitchell |
| 19 | Terminus | Gungahlin Place via Forde, Bonner and Amaroo |
| 20 | Terminus | Gungahlin Place via Amaroo Bonner and Forde |
| 21 | Terminus | Gungahlin Place via Palmerston, Harrison and Throsby |
| 22 | Terminus | Gungahlin Place via Throsby, Harrison and Palmerston |
| 23 | Terminus | Gungahlin Place via Crace, Gold Creek and Nicholls |
| 24 | Terminus | Gungahlin Place via Nicholls, Gold Creek and Crace |
| 25 | Terminus | Gungahlin Place via Amaroo, Taylor and Casey |
| 26 | Terminus | Gungahlin Place via Casey, Taylor and Amaroo |
| 27 | Casey Market Town via Moncrieff | Gungahlin (Valley Av) |
| 28 | Casey Market Town via Casey | Gungahlin (Valley Av) |
