= Jolimont Centre =

Commercial building and bus station in Canberra, Australia

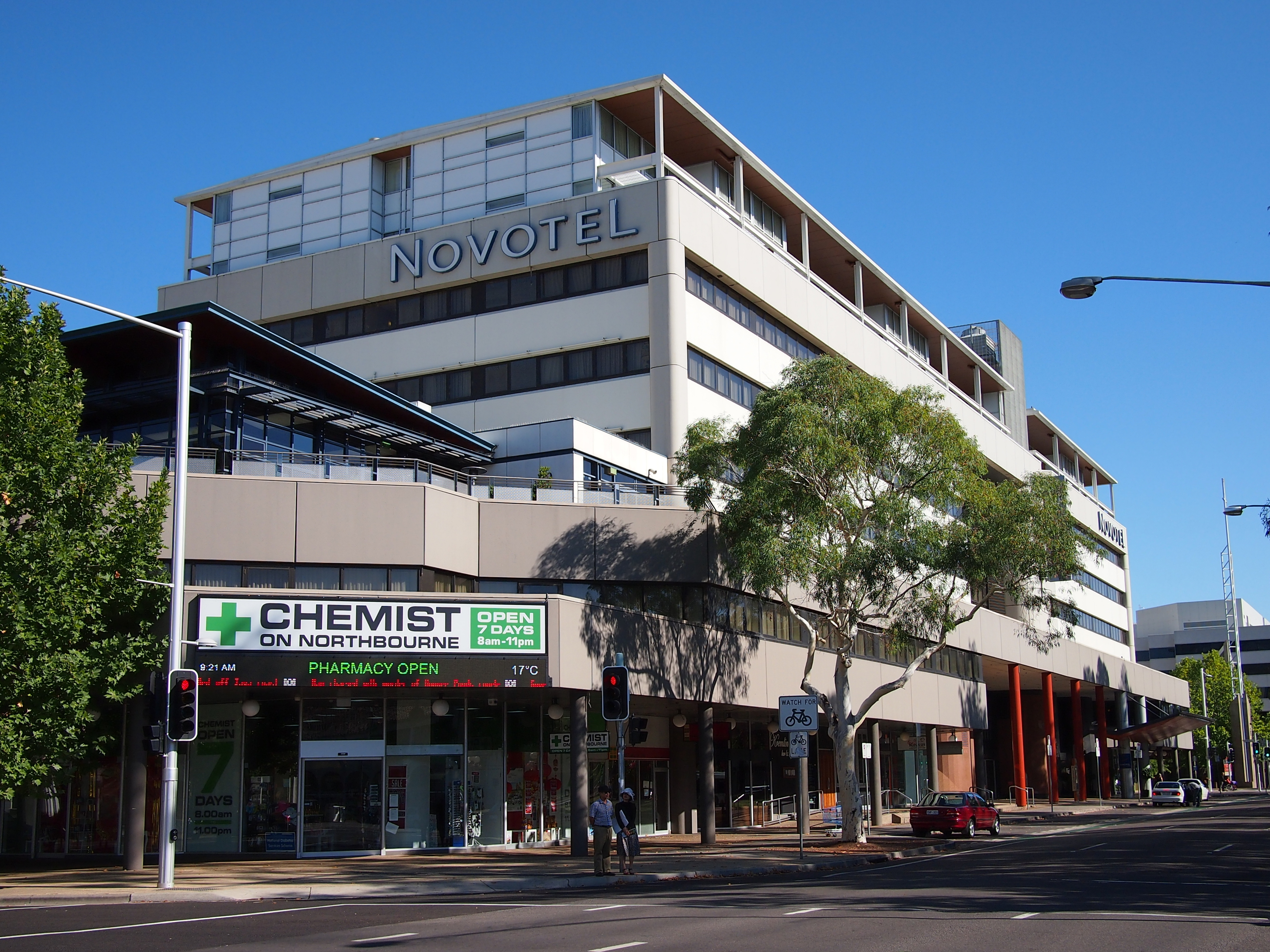
- Jolimont Centre in January 2014
- Interactive map of the Jolimont Centre area

General information
- Location: Northbourne Avenue, Civic, Australian Capital Territory
- Coordinates: 35.277585°S 149.129050°E
- Opening: 5 May 1983
- Owner: AMP

Technical details
- Floor count: 6
- Floor area: 12,400 square metres

Design and construction
- Architect: Godfrey and Spowers
- Developer: Lend Lease Development
- Main contractor: Civil & Civic

Website
- Public Transport Victoria

The Jolimont Centre is a commercial building in Canberra, Australia. It is also the city's long-distance coach station.

== History ==
In the late 1920s, a timber building named the Jolimont Building was erected in Civic, on a block bounded by Northbourne Avenue, Alinga, Moore, and Rudd Streets. The building had originally been manufactured in England in 1899 for use at Jolimont railway station in Melbourne. It was partially damaged by fire in 1969, and was demolished in 1977.

In 1978, approval was granted for the construction of a hotel complex and a long-distance coach terminal. After the project had not commenced in 1981, Lend Lease Development began work on a six-storey commercial and office complex, which was initially tenanted by the Department of Resources and Energy, the Canberra Tourist Bureau, Prime Television, Trans Australia Airlines, and radio station 2CA.

During the construction phase, the building was sold to AMP. A two-storey General Post Office was also built. It opened on 5 May 1983, with Ansett Pioneer and Greyhound using the coach terminal for services to Adelaide, Melbourne and Sydney. Later, CountryLink, Deluxe Coachlines, McCafferty's, Murrays, Transborder Express, Trans City, V/Line and FlixBus began using the terminal.

The 1993 Jolimont Centre siege saw the centre rammed by a vehicle rigged with petrol and gas canisters. The commercial space has since been converted to a Novotel hotel.

== Coach operators ==
- FlixBus to Sydney and Melbourne
- Murrays to Narooma, Sydney and Wollongong
- V/Line to Bairnsdale and Wodonga
