= Transport Canberra & City Services =

Directorate of the Australian Capital Territory government, Australia

Directorate overview
- Formed: 1 July 2016
- Preceding agencies: Transport and Municipal Services; Capital Metro Agency
- Jurisdiction: Australian Capital Territory
- Headquarters: 496 Northbourne Avenue, Dickson
- Employees: 2,055 (2019)
- Minister responsible: Chris Steel MLA, Minister for City Services, Minister for Roads, Minister for Transport
- Directorate executive: Alison Playford, Director-General
- Child agencies: Transport Canberra; City Services
- Key document: Administrative Arrangements 2019 (No 3) NI2019-674
- Website: https://www.cityservices.act.gov.au/

Transport Canberra & City Services (TCCS) is a directorate of the Government of the Australian Capital Territory of the Australian Capital Territory, responsible for managing roads, footpaths and cycle paths and managing public transport in Canberra including ACTION buses and the Canberra Light Rail through its Transport Canberra division.

Besides roads and transport, TCCS also delivers services such as recycling and collecting waste, public libraries and ensuring municipal infrastructure such as streetlights and public barbecues are in good working order. It also oversees the management of a number of the ACT Government's commercial operations, including ACT NOWaste, Capital Linen Service, ACT Public Cemeteries Authority (which includes Woden, Gungahlin and Hall cemeteries), and Yarralumla Nursery.

== History ==
The predecessor to TCCS was the Territory and Municipal Services Directorate (TAMS), previously the Department of Territory and Municipal Services (also TAMS). TAMS was formed on 1 July 2006 from the merger of the Department of Urban Services, Environment ACT, Australian Capital Tourism, Sport and Recreation ACT, ACTION, Canberra Stadiums and parts of the Office of Sustainability into a single department.

In October 2015, the ACT government announced that they were planning to form a standalone public transport directorate known as Transport Canberra, merged from ACTION buses and Capital Metro Agency (CMA), the agency in charge of planning the Canberra light rail project. The plan was modified and announced in April 2016 and the new changes took effect on 1 July 2016:

- the Territory and Municipal Services Directorate (TAMS) was renamed the Transport Canberra and City Services Directorate (TCCS)
- the Parks and Conservation function was transferred from the old TAMS to the Environment, Planning and Sustainable Development Directorate (EPSDD)
- the Active Travel Office was transferred from EPSDD to new TCCS
- the Capital Metro Agency (CMA) ceased as a separate reporting entity and its functions were amalgamated with the TCCS

The administrative changes brought together the CMA, ACTION buses and the existing municipal services functions of TAMS into one directorate. Transport Canberra was still created to manage public transport in Canberra, but as a division under the new TCCS directorate.

In December 2016, TCCS was given the responsibility of waste policy, transferred from the EPSDD.

== Structure ==
As of September 2019, TCCS operated under four areas of responsibilities, which are:

- Transport Canberra Division (Transport Canberra)
- City Services Division
- Chief Operating Officer Group
- Finance, Legal and Sustainability Group.

The directorate is responsible to Chris Steel, Minister for City Services, Recycling and Waste Reduction, Roads and Active Travel, and Transport.

As of 5 June 2019, the Director-General of TCCS is Alison Playford, who has held this position since May 2019. Emma Thomas was the inaugural and previous director-general until her retirement from the ACT public service in April 2019.

=== Transport Canberra ===
Transport Canberra

Agency overview
- Formed: 1 July 2016
- Preceding agencies: Transport for Canberra; Capital Metro Agency (CMA)
- Minister responsible: Chris Steel MLA, Minister for Transport
- Agency executive: Duncan Edghill, Deputy Director-General of TCCS
- Parent Directorate: Transport Canberra and City Services (TCCS)
- Child agency: ACTION
- Website: https://www.transport.act.gov.au

Transport Canberra (TC) is the transport agency equivalent in the ACT, in charge of managing Canberra's public transport network, including ACTION buses and Canberra Light Rail, as well as active travel. It was formed from combining the public transport division of the TAMS with Capital Metro Agency, the agency in charge of the light rail project. It also replaced the previous roads and public transport agency, Transport for Canberra. Originally planned to be a standalone government directorate, it was later changed to be a division of the newly created TCCS.
