= List of public art in Canberra =

Artworks on public display in Canberra, Australia

This is a list of public art on permanent public display in Canberra, Australian Capital Territory.

The list applies only to works of public art accessible in an outdoor public space; it does not include artwork on display inside museums. Public art may include sculptures, statues, monuments, memorials, murals and mosaics.

== List ==
Year	Name	Image	Artist	Location	Medium	Notes	Ref
1961	Ethos		Tom Bass	Civic Square 35.2813°S 149.1311°E	Copper	The winged female figure symbolises the civic pride of Canberra residents. The fabric of her robe is decorated with emblems and figures representing the community.	
1964	Father and Son		John Dowie	Garema Place 35.2783°S 149.1317°E		Dedicated to Sir John Downer.	
1967	Play Sculpture		David Tolley	Commonwealth Park 35.2891°S 149.1362°E	Precast concrete with a painted fibreglass finish	Consists of seven separate forms arranged to function as both play equipment and as seating	
1967	Untitled		Bert Flugelman	In front of Bruce Hall, Australian National University 35.2745°S 149.1169°E	Copper sheeted upright set on mosaic tile basin	This fountain is a thoughtful and well-integrated study of the spiralling and radiating movements of water and light.	
1968	Two Figures		Barbara Hepworth	Out front of National Capital Exhibition 35.2901°S 149.1312°E	Bronze		
1968-1973	Lintel Sculpture		Tom Bass	Above the front entrance of the National Library of Australia 35.2968°S 149.1300°E	Copper	It is based on allegorical symbols based on ancient Sumerian and Akkadian seals dating back to 3000 BC.	
1970	Sculptured Form		Margel Hinder	Woden Town Centre 35.3445°S 149.0857°E	Aluminium	Winner of a competition that invited artists to represent the "metamorphosis of a typical natural Australian environment into complex development for urban use"	
1970	Virginia		Clement Meadmore	National Gallery of Australia 35.3445°S 149.0857°E	Weathering steel	365 h x 1402 w x 609 d cm, 8164 kg Cross section 152.25 h cm	
1973	Dreaming		Milan Vojsk	Between Reserve Bank of Australia and Canberra City Police Station 35.2805°S 149.1268°E	Cast bronze figure on natural rock in rectangular pool		
1977	Seated Lady		Herman Hohaus	Commonwealth Park 35.2884°S 149.1340°E		From 1978 to about 2000 this sculpture was located at the government offices canteen in Woden, and then moved to Commonwealth Park.	
1978	Seqvanae		Michael Kitching	Canberra City Community Health Centre 35.2780°S 149.1276°E	Polished stainless steel and red fibreglass	Contains symbolic references to health and medicine	
1979	Tumbling Cubes		Bert Flugelman	Margaret Timpson Park 35.2379°S 149.0679°E	Polished stainless steel cubes	A series of highly-polished metal cubes.	
1980	Japanese Cherry Tree Grove			Canberra City Community Health Centre 35.2906°S 149.1287°E		A gift from the people of Japan presented during a visit in 1980 by Japanese Prime Minister Masayoshi Ōhira.	
1981	Wind Sculpture		Ernst Fries	Intersection of Akuna Street and City Walk 35.2780°S 149.1276°E	Stainless steel and painted steel		
1981	Eternity		John Robinson	Petrie Plaza 35.2799°S 149.1310°E	Polished bronze ring and black painted steel	Cast in Italy and donated anonymously to the people of Canberra in 1981	
1982	Gymnast		John Robinson				
1983	Edmund Barton Statue		Marc Clark	Southwest of Edmund Barton Building 35.3046°S 149.1343°E			
1985	Holodomor memorial		Yurii Denysenko	Ukrainian Orthodox Centre 35.2741°S 149.1271°E			
1986	Head		Bruce Armstrong	National Gallery of Australia 35.3003°S 149.1362°E	Carved red gum 155.5 h x 90.5 w x 239.5 d cm		
1988	Armillary sphere sundial		Hendrik Forster	Northwest corner terrace to Parliament Drive 35.2799°S 149.1310°E	Sand-cast and polished bronze on a large granite base	A gift from the Country Women's Association to the nation for the opening of Parliament House	
1988	Eglė the Queen of Serpents		Ieva Pocius	Glebe Park 35.2815°S 149.1361°E	Bronze	Refers to a Lithuanian folk tale about Eglė the Queen of Serpents	
1988	Illumicube		Kerry Simpson	Canberra Centre entrance through Ainslie Avenue 35.2795°S 149.1352°E	Glass and programmable LED lighting	Made from 570 glass bricks	
1989	Resting Place of the Dragonfly		Mary Kayser	Commonwealth Park 35.2887°S 149.1340°E	Painted steel	Originally exhibited as part of the 1989 Floriade Sculpture Project	
1995	Two Piece Reclining Figure No. 9		Henry Moore	East corner of the National Library of Australia 35.2965°S 149.1308°E		One of nine two-piece sculptures Moore created, starting in 1959	
2000	Lola Black Lola Pink		Stephanie Burns	East entrance of the Canberra Museum and Gallery 35.2808°S 149.1306°E	Bronze		
2000	Shevchenko's Visions		Anatoly Valiev	Ukrainian Orthodox Centre 35.2742°S 149.1270°E		In honour of Ukrainian writer, poet and artist Taras Shevchenko. Presented to the Ukrainian community in Australia by the city of Kyiv.	
2000	Korean War Memorial			Anzac Parade 35.2892°S 149.1417°E		Commemorates the Australians who served and who died in the Korean War	
2001	The Master's Voice		Sonia Leber and David Chesworth	City Walk 35.2810°S 149.1327°E	Digital recording, stainless steel grilles	People walking past hear the unexpected real–world sounds of people talking to animals, but with the sounds of the animals edited out, the voices seem to be calling out directly to the passersby: beckoning, controlling, coaxing.	
2001	Cushion		Matthew Harding	Garema Place 35.2808°S 149.1306°E	Stainless steel, polished granite "wedge" plinth, steel inlayed poetry pages	A lounging large stainless steel cushion. A poem by Marion Halligan lies on scattered pages on the granite plinth below the cushion to form a tribute to Garema Place.	
2001	Casuarina Pods		Matthew Harding	City Walk, Canberra 35.2819°S 149.1335°E	Bronze		
2001	Ainslie's Sheep		Les Kossatz	City Walk, Canberra 35.2798°S 149.1322°E	Cast aluminium		
2001	Circuitry		Fiona Hooton	Junction of Alinga Street and Mort Street 35.2782°S 149.1304°E	Painted steel		
2002	Diamonds		Neil Dawson	National Gallery of Australia 35.2999°S 149.1362°E	Aluminium extrusion, mesh painted with synthetic polymer automotive paints, stainless steel fittings, cables		
2002	Vortex		David Jensz	New Acton Precinct 35.2846°S 149.1242°E	Corrugated iron	190 X 210 X 235 cm	
2002	The Glebe		Hew Chee Fong and L. M. Noonan	Glebe Park 35.2826°S 149.1367°E	Grandee granite and porphyry pavers	Inspired by Glebe House, previously located on this site, the Glebe is made from a single block of grandee granite, segmented into house shaped blocks to represent European settlement of the area and the sub-division of the original Glebe allotment of 119 acres.	
2005	Red and Blue		Inge King	National Gallery of Australia 35.2792°S 149.1276°E	Polychrome steel		
2006	ACT Memorial		Matthew Harding	Ainslie Place 35.2808°S 149.1316°E		Dedicated in 2006	
2006	Fractal Weave		David Jensz	Canberra Theatre Centre 35.2812°S 149.1306°E	Two woven curved forms in copper piping and sits on a granite plinth		
2007	Resilience		Ante Dabro	Intersection of Binara St and City Walk 35.2824°S 149.1338°E	Bronze		
2007	Gather		Matthew Tobin	Intersection of Bougainville Street and Flinders Way, Griffith 35.3211°S 149.1336°E	Bronze and mosaic tile	These sculptures appear as a group of surreal vegetative forms crowned with oversized seed pods (referencing nearby Liquidambar trees).	
2007	Relic		Rick Amor	Intersection of Childers Street and University Avenue 35.2789°S 149.1238°E	Bronze	It is a bronze sentinel, an ancient figure borne from distant memory, standing at a nexus of both time and place.	
2007	Sculpture No 23 (The Parcel)		Alex Seton	Corner of West Row and Alinga Street 35.2784°S 149.1276°E	Western Australian jade green marble, white marble and resin inlay	It is a carved illusion where an everyday object is transformed into and object of art.	
2008	Choice of Passage		Phil Price	Waldorf Arcade, London Circuit 35.2820°S 149.1321°E	Polyurethane painted fabricated steel	It uses abstract forms to create a sense of balance and poise.	
2008	The Big Little Man		Dean Bowen	Petrie Plaza 35.2797°S 149.1315°E	Bronze	It provokes interaction and discussion.	
2008	Untitled		Jean-Pierre Rives	7 London Circuit 35.2816°S 149.1251°E	Painted steel	Donated to the ACT Public Art Collection by Leighton Properties	
2008	Rain Pools		Stephen Newton	East side of Clare Holland House 35.3043°S 149.1522°E	Carved granite	It is a series of granite discs that respond to the tranquillity of Lake Burley Griffin. They symbolise circles of support and the bonds of a common humanity.	
2008	Dinornis Maximus		Phil Price	Yarra Glen, Curtin 35.3334°S 149.0862°E	Wind kinetic sculpture 11 metre tall	It uses fully-sealed rolling bearing systems designed for longevity and environmental resilience to create "a wind powered ballet in the sky".	
2008	Paper Plane		Jerko Starcevic	15 Lancaster Place, Canberra Airport 35.2978°S 149.1877°E	Steel	It symbolise flight in all its simplicity but with an understanding of its intellectual difficulty.	
2009	On the Staircase		Keld Moseholm	Gorman Arts Centre courtyard 35.2816°S 149.1251°E	Bronze, copper	It has a philosophical aspect by reflecting on the effect of reading on the spirit - 'the more I read the smaller I feel'.	
2009	Icarus		Jan Brown	Garema Place 35.2794°S 149.1322°E	Bronze	Four bronze figures are inspired by the ancient Greek myth of Icarus.	
2009	Vessel of (Horti)cultural Plenty		Warren Langley	Intersection of Rimmer Street and Marcus Clarke Street 35.2769°S 149.1262°E	Galvanised steel, polycarbonate, LED lights	The Vessel holds abstracted flowers that are illuminated at night and move with the breeze.	
2009	DNA		Jonathon Leahey	Alexandrina Drive, Yarralumla 35.2991°S 149.1103°E	Corten steel, stainless steel	It consists of 27 interconnected cubes.	
2009	Genesis		Ante Dabro	25 Brindabella Circuit, Brindabella Business Park 35.3152°S 149.1890°E		The artist describes it as “a symphony of forms and echoes the beginning of time, sensing the site called for a composition of two”.	
2009	Young Eagle		Qian Jian Hua	Intersection of Bunda Street and Garema Place 35.2784°S 149.1325°E	Bronze	It evokes the strength, optimism and freedom of youth - a spirit that can be embraced at any age.	
2010	Tree of Knowledge		Peter Latona	Garran Place 35.3423°S 149.1086°E	Bronze, stone	It honours Australian writers and the part played by landscape in our literature. Local stone forms the base of this cast bronze sculpture which reflects playfully on relationships between human knowledge and our native landscape.	
2010	Windstone - A Trail of a Cloud		Koichi Ishino	Glebe park 35.2811°S 149.1348°E	Stainless steel, granite	The solidity and surface detail of natural granite is a sharp contrast to the ethereal, mirrored surface of stainless steel.	
2010	Cupressus sempervirens		Paul Jamieson	The lane on the west of New Acton Precinct 35.2844°S 149.1244°E			
2010	Life Cycle		David Jensz	Intersection of Bunda Street and Petrie Plaza 35.2790°S 149.1332°E	Stainless steel, stone	Mixture of stone and steel create a form that is both supple and organic. The double spiral of tightly packed stones is a visual metaphor for a life crammed full of experience.	
2010	Eran		Gloria Thapich	National Gallery of Australia 35.3011°S 149.1355°E	Aluminium	2.7 meters height	
2010	Within without		James Turrell	National Gallery of Australia 35.3016°S 149.1365°E		This Skyspace is a viewing chamber that affects the way we perceive the sky.	
2010	Ebb and Flow		Matthew Harding	Corner of Bunda Street and Genge Street 35.2776°S 149.1317°E	Stainless steel	It draws in and reflects back the movement and colour of one of Canberra's busiest urban streets. The sculpture appears to be made of liquid and light.	
2010	Toku		Shinki Kato	Lennox Gardens 35.2981°S 149.1216°E	Steel, granite, mirror	Toku was commissioned to celebrate the 1300th anniversary of Japan’s ancient capital.	
2010	Saltimbanque		Tim Kyle	Kendall Lane, New Acton Precinct 35.2850°S 149.1240°E			
2011	Modern Man		Tim Kyle	New Acton Precinct 35.2847°S 149.1251°E			
2011	Statues of Prime Minister John Curtin and Treasurer Ben Chifley		Peter Corlett	Intersection of Walpole Crescent and Queen Victoria Terrace 35.3049°S 149.1326°E	Bronze		
2011	Lady With Flowers		Dean Bowen	Flemington Road, Gungahlin 35.2002°S 149.14911°E	Bronze		
2011	A is for Alexander B is for Bunyip C is for Canberra		Anne Ross	Flemington Road, Gungahlin 35.1853°S 149.1318°E	Bronze, Stainless Steel, Glass, Light	Inspired by the popular 1972 children's book, The Monster that Ate Canberra by Michael Salmon	
2011	The Big Powerful Owl		Bruce Armstrong	Intersection of Benjamin Way and Belconnen Way 35.2475°S 149.0675°E	Cast composite, steel, hardwood, paint	It honours the Powerful owl, Ninox strenua, which is the largest owl species in Australasia.	
2011	Two to Tango		Michael Le Grand	Shakespeare Square, London Circuit 35.2807°S 149.1257°E	Painted steel	It refers to couples or plant shoots reflecting the growth and rise of the city centre and its changing demographic.	
2011	bush pack (nil tenure)		Amanda Stuart	City Walk, Canberra 35.2789°S 149.1316°E	Bronze	Seven dogs in three groups run down City Walk in the direction of the Civic carousel. The artwork is of an intimate pedestrian scale.	
2011	Fenix 2		N/A	Latin American Plaza, Childers Street 35.2773°S 149.1255°E	Stainless steel	Replica of the capsule that rescued 33 trapped miners from the San Jose mine in the Atacama Desert, Chile in October 2010.	
2011	Folding Ground Across the In Between (Pink sculpture) Sky Shard Above the In Between (Blue sculpture)		Jon Tarry	Intersection of Moore Street and Rudd Street 35.2770°S 149.1279°E (Pink sculpture); 35.2768°S 149.1281°E (Blue sculpture)	Steel and paint		
2012	Robert Menzies statue		Peter Corlett	Commonwealth Park 35.2904°S 149.1344°E	Bronze		
2012	Perception and Reality 1		Andrew Rogers	Canberra Airport 35.2811°S 149.2491°E	Bronze	Australia’s largest cast figurative bronze sculpture	
2012	The Other Side of Midnight		Anne Ross	City Walk 35.2806°S 149.1327°E	Bronze, stainless steel		
2012	Chalchiuhtlicue		Jesús Mayagoitia	Latin American Plaza, Childers Street 35.2773°S 149.1255°E	Steel	Inspired by the pre-Hispanic stone sculpture of the same name, found at the archaeological site of Teotihuacan, Mexico.	
2012	Droplet		Stuart Green	23 Furzer Street, Phillip 35.3421°S 149.0841°E	Electro-polished 316 grade stainless steel		
2012	Poets' Corner		Cathy Weiszmann	Glebe Park 35.2815°S 149.1358°E	Bronze and Granite	Three bronze busts depicting Canberra-focused Australian poets Judith Wright, A. D. Hope and David Campbell	
2012	Dream Lens for the Future		Keizo Ushio	Vibe Hotel Canberra 35.3090°S 149.1878°E	Japanese Granite	Carved from a single piece of stone	
2012	Journeys		Phil Price	Entrance to the Canberra Airport 35.3087°S 149.1868°E		Wind-activated kinetic sculpture that has 22 moving joints	
2012	Longitude		Matthew Harding	Veterans Park 35.2769°S 149.1302°E	Granite	The artist takes up the concept of emotional separation that service personnel and their families experience during periods of active duty	
2012-2014	Big Snake		Phil Price	Legislative Plaza 35.2819°S 149.1316°E		Wind-activated kinetic sculpture. The identical sculptures have been placed in various places in the world.	
2013	Patria es Humanidad (Our Country is Humanity)		Nelson Dominguez Cedeño (with the support of local artist Geoff Farquhar-Still)	Latin American Plaza, Childers Street 35.2777°S 149.1262°E	Steel, gravel, stone	Donated by Cuba	
2014	Canberra Centenary Column		Geoff Farquhar-Still	City Hill 35.2814°S 149.1292°E	Stainless steel, granite, glass tiles	Inspired by the Canberra Commencement Column	
2014	Hungarian Gate		Balázs Gábor	Bowen Park 35.3087°S 149.1404°E		Gift from the people of Hungary presented to the people of Canberra	
2014	The Encounter		Hugo Morales	Latin American Plaza, Childers Street 35.2776°S 149.1260°E	Steel	Donated by the Government of Uruguay and the people of Soriano Province	
2015	Elevation of the senses		Ewen Coates	Australian War Memorial 35.2813°S 149.1493°E	Bronze	Dedicated to explosive detection dogs	
2019	The Wayfinder		Bev Hogg	Entrance to the Centenary Hospital for Women and Children 35.3442°S 149.1016°E	Concrete, stainless steel, granite	This fanciful bird at top of rock has a strong life force, she points our way towards hope, wisdom and mystery.	
2020	Undergrazing		Sian Watson	Hobart Place 35.279543°S 149.126064°E	Bronze	Inspired by the artist’s long-standing relationship with animals and the landscape	
2020	Windswept		April Pine	Constitution Place 35.2831°S 149.1311°E	Weathered steel	It depicts the architect of the Constitution of Australia – Andrew Inglis Clark, who was a founding father and co-author of the Australian Constitution.	
2021	John Gorton statue		Lis Johnson	South of John Gorton Building 35.3026°S 149.1336°E	Bronze		
2022	Big Swoop		Yanni Pounartzis	Petrie Plaza 35.2786°S 149.1319°E	Fibreglass with steel structure	Has been commemorated on stamps and coins	
2022	Duyfken			Willem Janszoon Commemorative Park 35.3305°S 149.1301°E			
2022	Christ child and Saint Christopher			St Christopher's Cathedral, Manuka 35.3185°S 149.1324°E	Bronze		
2023	Vivian Bullwinkel		Charles Robb	Australian War Memorial 35.2814°S 149.1494°E	Bronze, stainless steel, concrete		
2024	Ouroboros		Lindy Lee	National Gallery of Australia 35.3013°S 149.1353°E	Recycled stainless steel	Commissioned to celebrate the 40th anniversary of the museum	
	Introspection		Ante Dabro	Canberra Airport	Bronze		
	Between Innings		Gary Lee Price	Theatre end of Lyric Lane, Constitution Place 35.2824°S 149.1310°E	Bronze	Sourced from the United States	
	Journeys of the Imagination		Gary Lee Price	25 Catalina Drive, Majura Park 35.2988°S 149.1882°E	Bronze		
	Flight		Keizo Ushio	Vibe Hotel Canberra 35.3090°S 149.1878°E			
	Uluru Line			National Museum of Australia 35.2928°S 149.1202°E			
	Dance of the Secateurs		Bruce Radke	Commonwealth Park 35.2884°S 149.1329°E		Winner of the 1988 Canberra Floriade sculpture award	
	Kangaroo and Joey		Jan Brown	Commonwealth Park 35.2877°S 149.1322°E			
	Skylark		Sian Watson	East Hotel, Kingston 35.3193°S 149.1373°E	steel, cement, sealant, paint	237 x 90 x 40 cm	
	Zugzwang		Philip Spelman	Commonwealth Park 35.2885°S 149.1324°E		It recalls the carts that carried people to the guillotine during the French Revolution and is named Zugzwang, a chess term that refers to forcing a player into an unwanted move.	
	Torsional Wave			Questacon 35.2990°S 149.1312°E		Wind-activated kinetic sculpture. It consists of 25 horizontal bars, suspended vertically by means of a central tensile strap which is, in turn, attached to two parallel columns of spheres.	
	Ithaca		Anne Ferguson	The lane on the west of New Acton 35.2845°S 149.1243°E			
	Canberra's Basketball Tree			Petrie Plaza 35.2847°S 149.1244°E			
	Time Thief (center to left) & Bowerbird (right corner)		Robin Blau	New Acton Precinct 35.2797°S 149.1313°E			
	The Astronomer		Tim Wetherell	Questacon 35.2982°S 149.1319°E		Made from the ruins of the Mount Stromlo Observatory, which was destroyed by the 2003 Canberra bushfires	
	Albert Einstein			Questacon 35.2987°S 149.1314°E			
	Wings of Ethos			Out front of Manuka Terrace 35.3205°S 149.1339°E			
	Unknown			240 Bunda Street 35.3457°S 149.2060°E			
