= City Walk, Canberra =

Pedestrian area in Australian Capital Territory, Australia

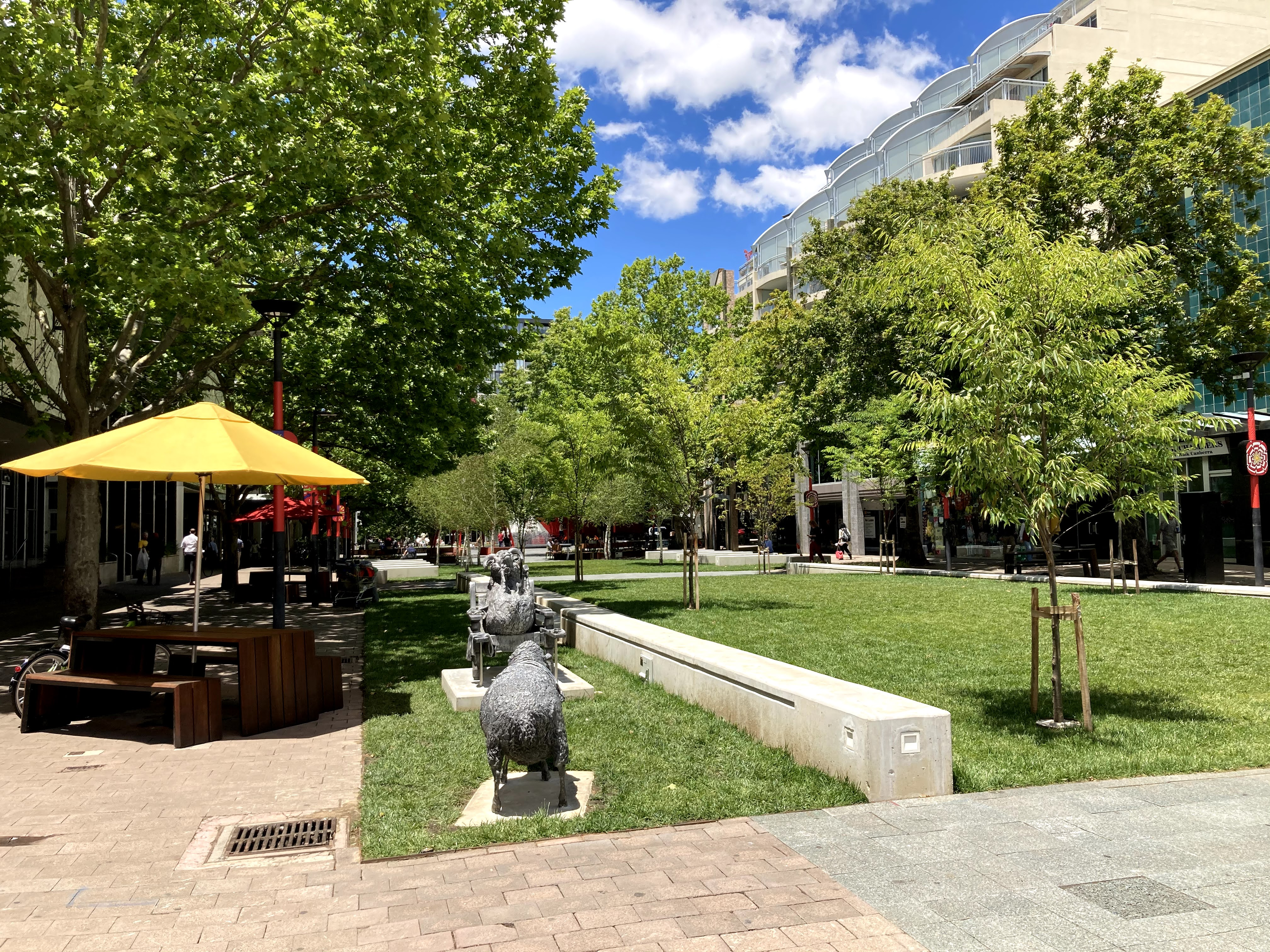
City Walk, a pedestrian mall in Civic is a focus of retail activity and outdoor dining

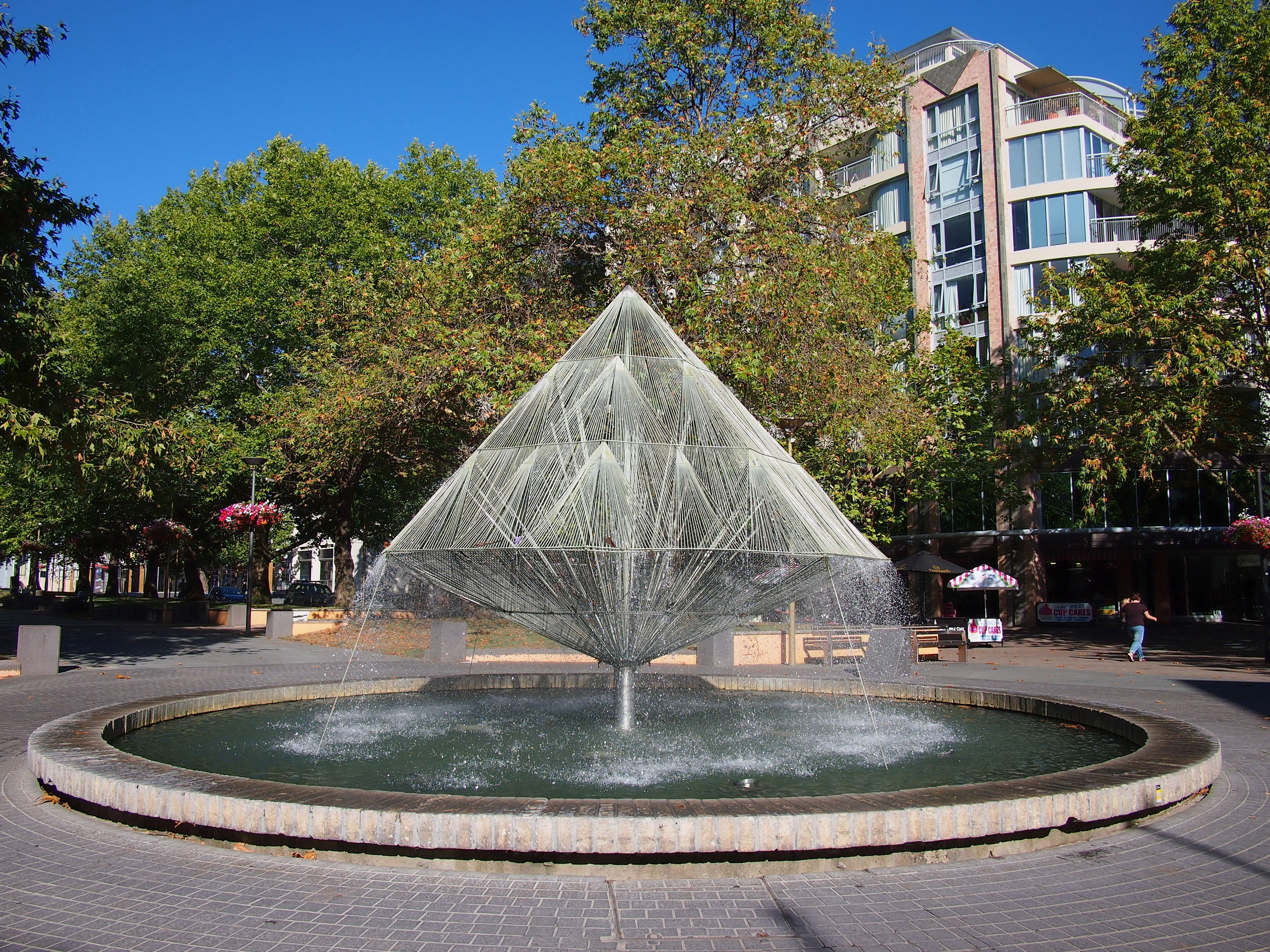
The Canberra Times fountain

City Walk is a paved outdoor pedestrian area in Civic, Canberra. It was formed by the closure to traffic of Alinga Street between East Row in the east (at the City Interchange) and Binara Street (near Casino Canberra) in the south-west, and named City Walk in January 1975. Pedestrians can walk almost the whole way without having to cross any roads with cars on them, except for Akuna Street.

City Walk intersects with Garema Place and Petrie Plaza. Along the walk can be found the Canberra Merry-Go-Round, the Centrepoint arcade, Canberra Centre shopping centre and the Canberra Times fountain.

City Walk often has street performers, and events such as the National Multicultural Festival.

== Upgrades ==
In 2025, City Walk began to be upgraded by the ACT Government which included adding new paving, improving lighting, and adding Aboriginal artworks on light poles.
