= John Robinson (sculptor) =

British sculptor (1935–2007)

John Robinson (4 May 1935 – 6 April 2007) was a British sculptor and co-founder of the Bradshaw Foundation. Accounts of his work may be seen at the Robinson estate website, the website of the Centre for the Popularisation of Mathematics and the June and July 2007, issues of Hyperseeing. Among other distinctions, he was the Official Sculptor for the British Olympic Committee in 1988, and a University of Wales Honorary Fellow, 1992.

== Sculpture ==
=== Figurative sculptures ===
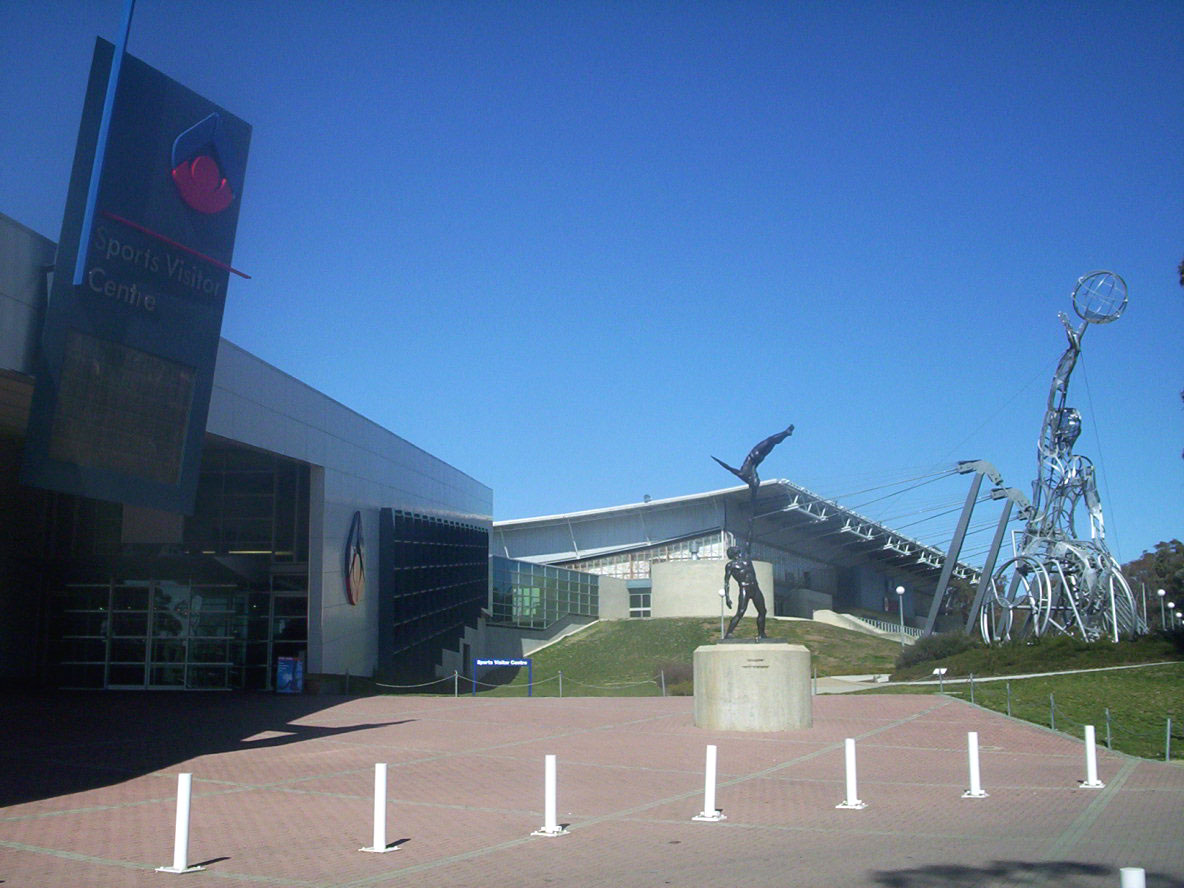
The Acrobats in front of the Australian Institute of Sport in Canberra

Robinson first made a name for himself with representational pieces. His figurative bronzes ranged in scope and scale from life-size commissioned sculptures of children to athletic sculptures, and included a commissioned bust of Queen Elizabeth and another of the Queen Mother. His representational sports figure Acrobats (1980, 5 metres) was first mounted at the Hyatt Regency hotel in Maui, Hawaii. There are another 7 examples around the world, one of which is located outside the Australian Institute of Sport in Canberra, Australia. Another of his athletic sculptures, Hammer Thrower, may be seen at the United States Sports Academy, Daphne, Alabama, and in Queen Victoria Gardens, Melbourne, Australia. A third version was outside the Bowring Building in Tower Hill, London, now Tower Place, but its current location is unknown. Robinson was Official Sculptor for the British Olympic Committee in 1988. His Gymnast is at the Olympic Museum in Lausanne, donated by the Australian Olympic Committee.

=== Abstract symbolic sculptures and tapestries ===
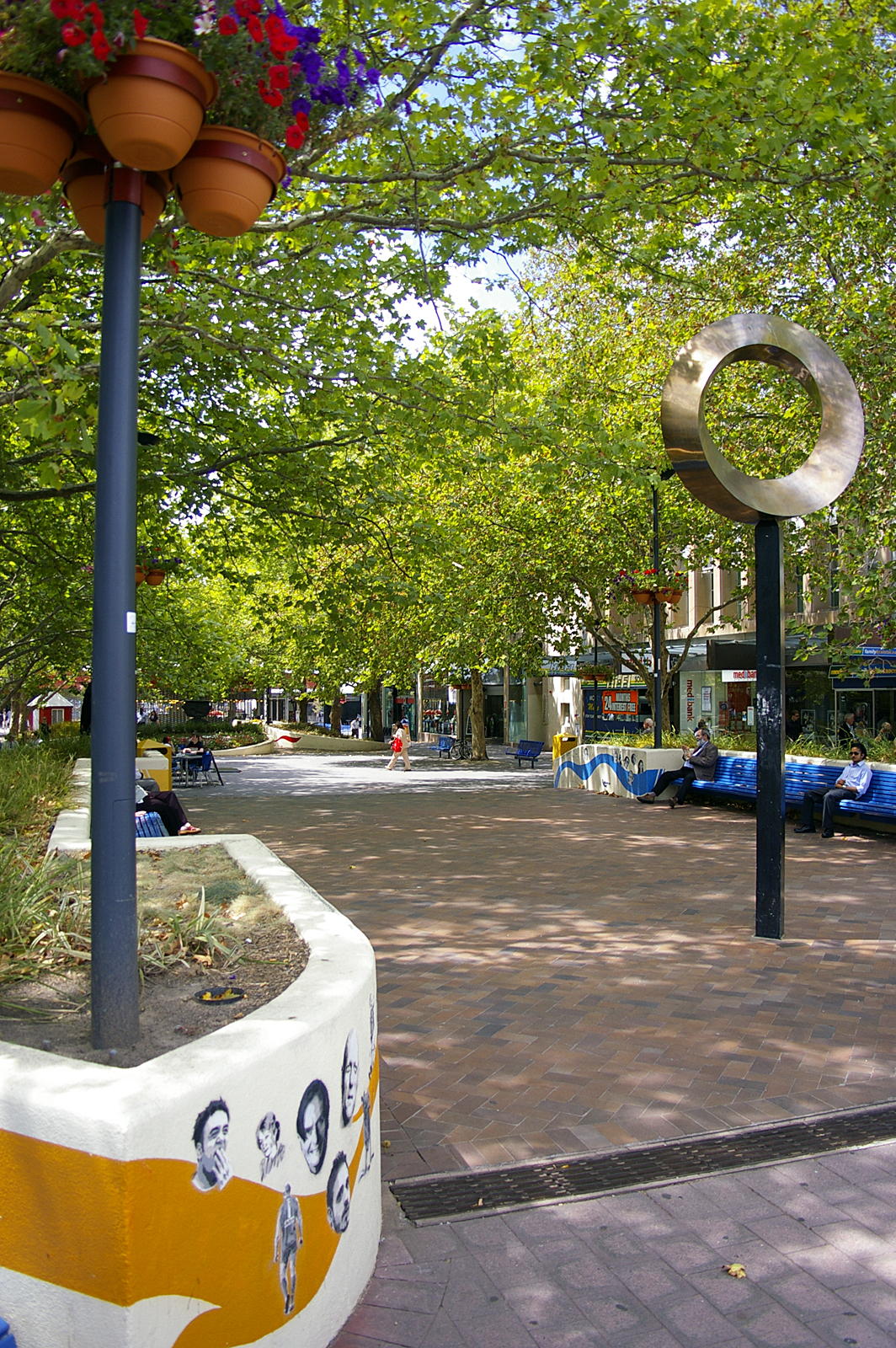
Eternity (1981) at Petrie Plaza, Canberra

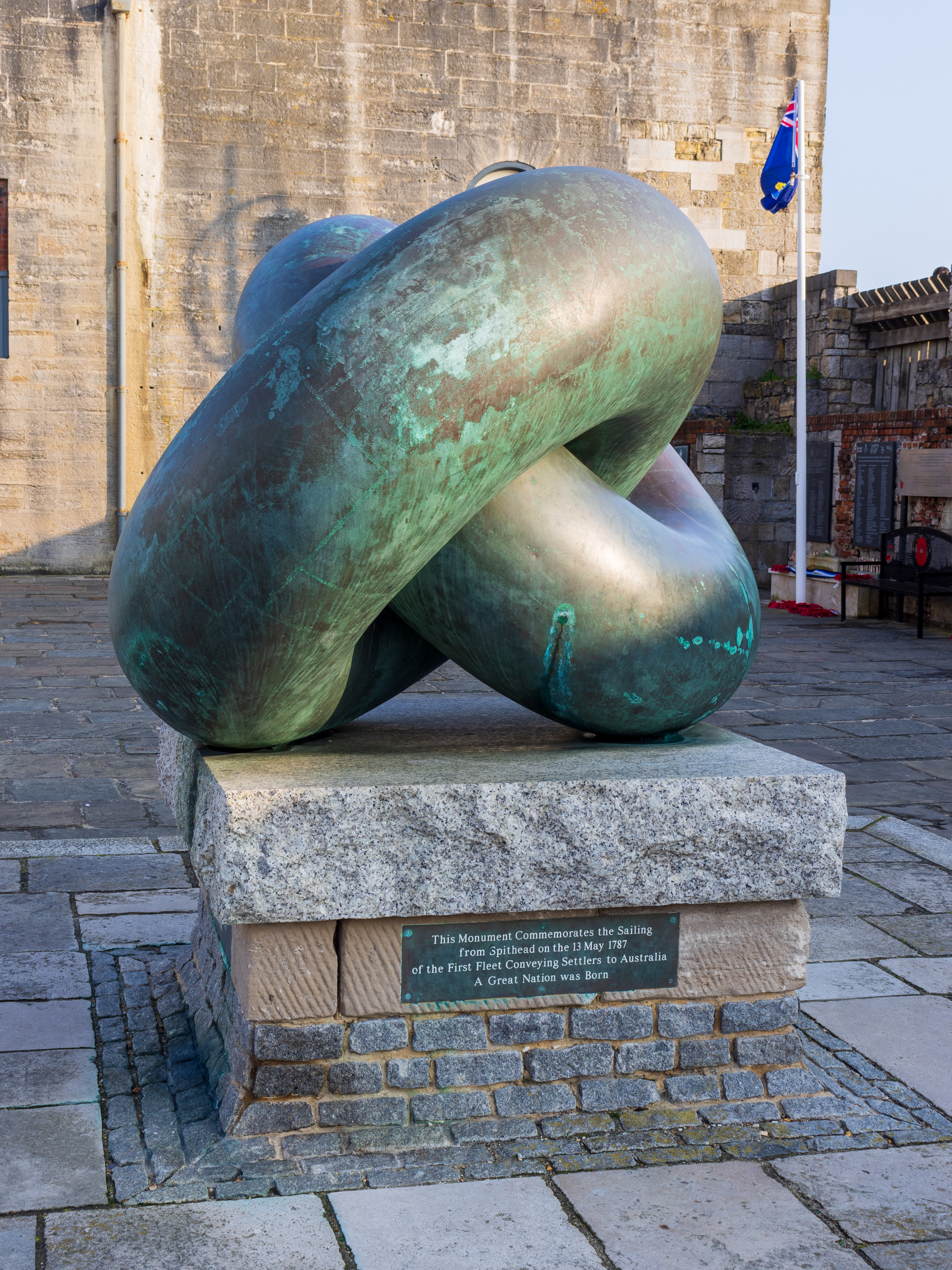
Bonds of Friendship in Portsmouth

In 1975, after listening to a Mozart violin concerto, an abstract form came into his mind, which he then translated into a sculpture. This Adagio was the first of his non-figurative sculptures. Robinson then embarked on a series of abstract sculptures with the aim of symbolizing human values and our concepts of the dynamic processes which shape our lives. In this 'Universe Series' of symbolic sculptures and tapestries, which comprises over 100 works, he combined scientific and mathematical principles with artistic aesthetic. One example is Joy of Living (1993), a curving band of stainless steel. The symbolic Elation (1983) conveys the punching of the fist in triumph.

A number of Robinson's sculptures show scientific concepts, such as matter/antimatter in Janus, evolution in Evolution the explosions of stars in StarBurst. He produced sculptures related to fiber bundles and to Borromean rings. He has also made a set of tapestries, woven in Aubusson, France.

One of Robinson's best-known symbolic sculptures is Bonds of Friendship (1979), which he dedicated as symbolizing the notion that "trust is the basis of peace". A 1.5m x 1m edition of Bonds, in polished bronze, was unveiled in 1979 in Sydney Cove by the Governor General of Australia, to commemorate the landing in 1788 of the First Fleet. An analogous sculpture, but patinated to represent the Old Country, was unveiled in Portsmouth by Queen Elizabeth. Robinson said that 'Bonds' "symbolises the friendship that exists between the two countries, as well as between my patrons and myself, which has enriched my life beyond measure and made the Symbolic Sculptures possible".

Selections of Robinson's work have been exhibited at the universities of Leeds, Bangor, Swansea, Liverpool, Wadham College Oxford, Churchill College Cambridge, London, Barcelona, Zaragoza, and at several sites in the U.S. His symbolic sculptures have been donated to a number of universities, including Bangor (4), Cambridge (5), Durham (3), Oxford (2), Macquarie (1). Many of his sculptures can be viewed on web sites, including the Robinson estate website. A discussion of Robinson's work within the context of mathematical principles can be seen at the website of the Centre for the Popularisation of Mathematics hosted by the University of Wales, Bangor.

== Biography ==
Robinson was born in London on 4 May 1935. His father was Australian and mother English. He was evacuated to Australia from 1940 to 1943, where attended Melbourne Grammar School. On returning to England, he attended Rugby School, where he received prizes for geometry and sculpture. He left school at the age of 16 and joined the Merchant Navy, but left the Navy upon arrival in Australia. There he engaged in a wide range of activities that enabled him to explore that continent. His adventures ranged from jackerooing and cattle droving to serving on a mounted patrol: he joined the last Mounted Police Patrol and trekked on horseback through 1100 kilometres of the Wunaamin Miliwundi Ranges of the Kimberley region of Western Australia. In the 1950s, he married, bought a 1,600-acre (6.5 km^{2}) virgin scrub block in the Ninety Mile Desert of South Australia and for ten years, he and Margie developed a sheep farm. Their three sons were born on that farm.

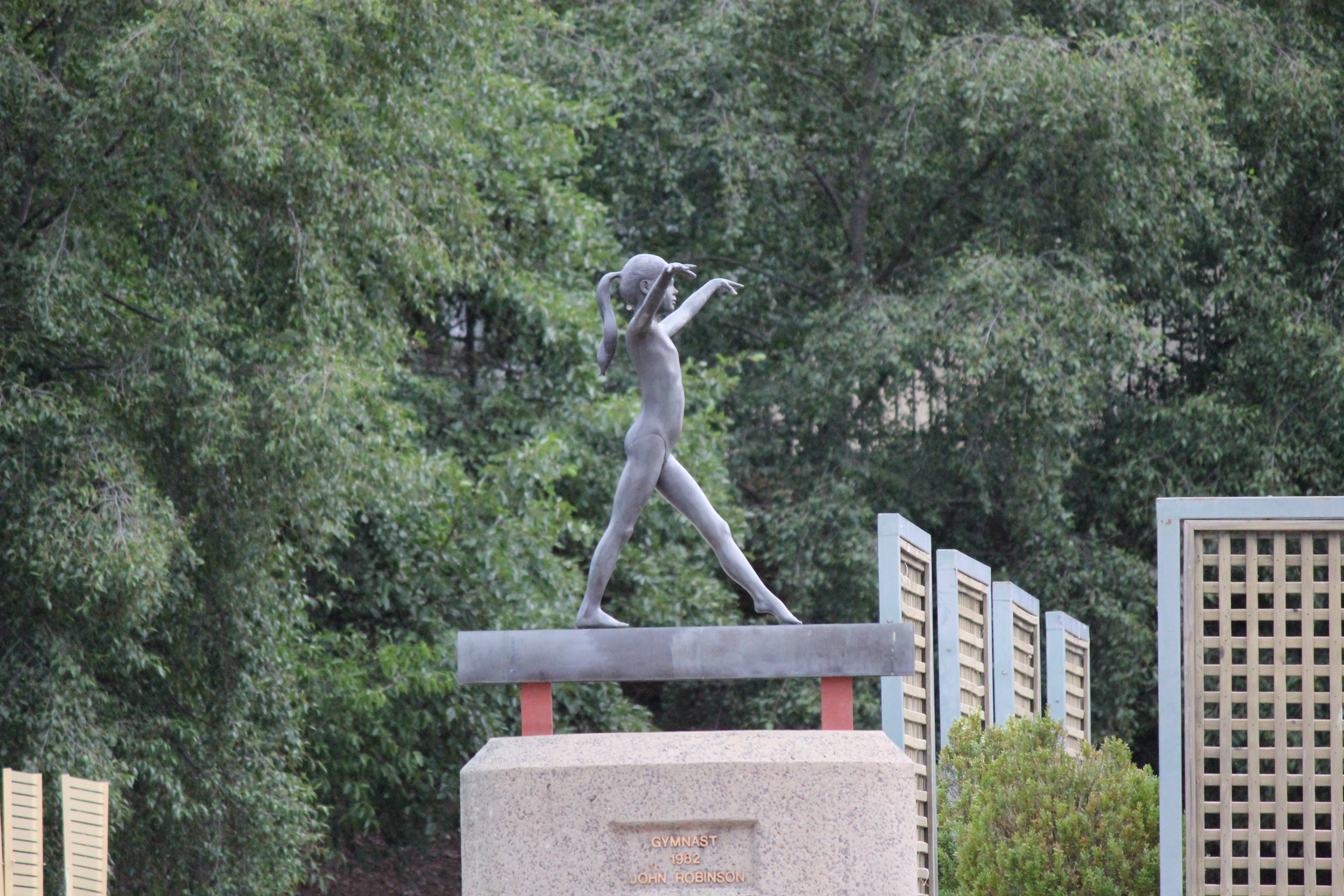
The Gymnast at the Australian Institute of Sport in Canberra.

In the late 1960s, he bought some modelling clay and started modelling friends and children, working in his shearing shed at weekends. His sculpting became so consuming that, in 1969 at the age of 35, having developed the farm totally and alone, he sold it for enough money to support himself and his family for two years to try his hand as a sculptor. Robinson returned to England with his wife and 3 sons to begin his sculpting career in earnest. Robinson first worked from a barn studio in Devon in the early 1970s, and later moved his family and studio to Somerset.

In 1983-1985 Robinson opened the Freeland Gallery in Albemarle Street, London, showing both figurative and representative sculptures. This led to contact with several art collectors and with the topologist Ronnie Brown. He and John collaborated in designing an exhibition of 13 full size sculptures at the Pop Maths Roadshow at Leeds University in 1989. The Catalogue they prepared for this exhibition, Symbolic Sculptures and Tapestries, was widely distributed and led to further exhibitions.

In 1992 John was made an Honorary Fellow of the University of Wales, in recognition of the value of his sculpture and his collaboration with the Department of Mathematics. In 1996 he worked with Ronnie Brown and Cara Quinton on a web account of his sculptures, and this convinced him of the value of the internet. In typical fashion, he developed his own ideas, skills and a team of experts. Later he worked with Nick Mee of Virtual Image to create animations of some of his sculptures, and these were used in a CDRom produced by John, another developed by Ronnie Brown in WMY2000 under an EC grant, and in the two web sites referred to earlier.

For an indication of John's style of symbolism and craftmanship, see Mortality 'From nothing to nothing, cut from an egg, representing the cycle of life', and also Immortality, Passing on the torch of life.

=== Rock Art Research and the Bradshaw Foundation ===
After a lifetime of interest in art, archaeology and anthropology, Robinson co-founded the Bradshaw Foundation. This foundation was formed in 1992 following an expedition to the Kimberley region of north-western Australia to examine a distributed set of rock art called the Bradshaws. Robinson's travels to study rock art took him from the Sahara Desert to Easter Island. He was one of the few members of the Chauvet Cave scientific exploration team, led by Jean Clottes. In 1998, Robinson visited the Chauvet cave with Dr. Clottes, Dr. David Lewis-Williams, and several other team members, to visit the images estimated to be older than 35,000 years, the oldest art yet discovered. Robinson also travelled from Petra in Jordan to Kata Tjuṯa in Central Australia, visited art academies throughout China, and explored the temples of Egypt, Mexico, Malta, Samarkand and Bokara in Uzbekistan.

The Bradshaw Foundation's first publication 'Bradshaws - Rock Paintings of North-Western Australia' was edited by Robinson in 1993. He foresaw the importance of the emerging World Wide Web, and in 1997 the Bradshaw Foundation website was established to highlight rock art research from around the world. In 2004 the website further expanded as Robinson introduced the genetic research of Professor Stephen Oppenheimer of Oxford University, in order to give rock art an anthropological context. This resulted in the 'Journey of Mankind - Genetic Map'. It was at this point the Bradshaw Foundation received a web award from Scientific American for work in the field of Anthropology & Paleontology.

In March 2007 Robinson was diagnosed with advanced lung cancer. He died on 6 April the same year at his home in Somerset, England after a short illness, fully in control, and, as he said, with no regrets. Two of his sculptures illustrate his attitude: Mortality (1982), From nothing to nothing, cut from an egg, where the egg is the symbol of the cycle of life; and Immortality (1982), Passing on the torch of life.
