= Bunda Street =

Street in Canberra, Australia

Bunda Street Australian Capital Territory
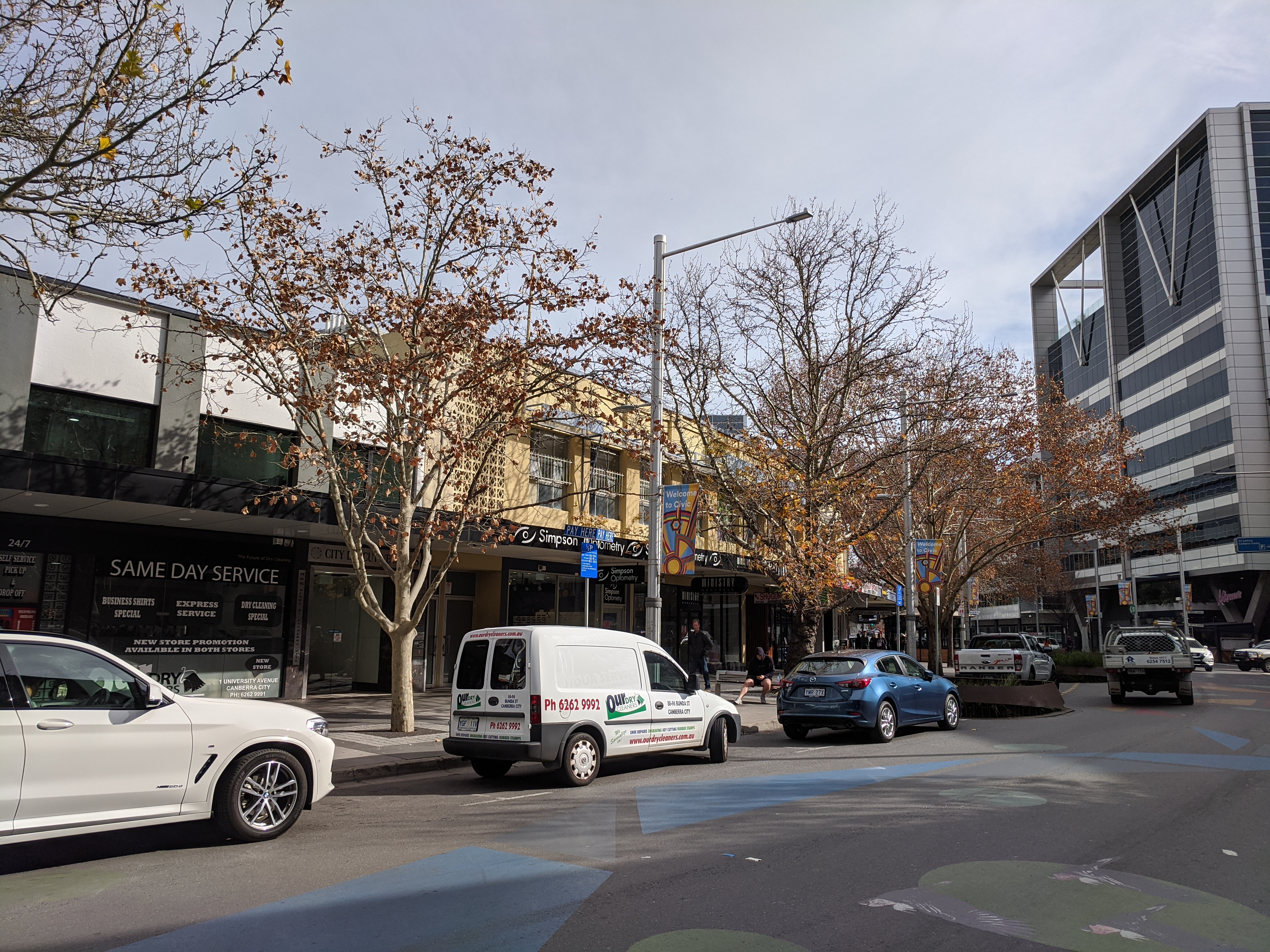
- Bunda Street in July 2020
- Coordinates: 35.277115°S 149.129414°E (West end); 35.282002°S 149.134908°E (East end)

General information
- Type: Street
- Length: 800 m (0.5 mi)
- Opened: 1953

Major junctions
- West end: Rudd Street; Civic, Australian Capital Territory
- Northbourne Avenue
- East end: Binara Street; Civic, Australian Capital Territory

Location(s)
- Suburb(s): Civic (CBD)

Bunda Street is a shared traffic zone in Canberra, Australia. Linking Northbourne Avenue and Glebe Park, Bunda Street is one of the main shopping and retail streets within the Civic area. The street is lined by many cafes and nightclubs, and passes underneath the Canberra Centre. Bunda Street forms part of a corridor known as the City Cycle Loop that forms a connection between the Sullivans Creek shared path and the commuter cycling networks to the south of the city. The name Bunda is believed to be an aboriginal word for "kangaroo".

The street has a strong association with the cultural development of Canberra. It is the location of several heritage sites that were significant to the growth of cultural activities in the young city. It remains a focal point for community events, including as a major venue during the annual National Multicultural Festival, which sees the street closed to vehicular traffic for several days.

While most businesses along Bunda Street are involved in retail trade, there is some office and residential development along short sections that were not converted to a shared zone in the mid-2010s. At the northern end, the street connects directly to the Civic bus interchange at a junction with Mort Street a short distance from Northbourne Avenue. At this corner, the lobby of ActewAGL House, the corporate headquarters of ActewAGL, prominently featured an art installation called The Journey by Robert Foster from 2010 until 2022. This installation consisted of a 300 m^{2} (3,200 sq ft) array of illuminated plexiglass cones that reacted to the time of day and passing pedestrians. At the southern end, the regional headquarters of Cisco is a major tenant of the 224 Bunda Street office tower and the 16-story Manhattan on the Park apartment building sits opposite Glebe Park.

== History ==
Following gazettal of the name in October 1952, earthworks were completed for a new city block extending off London Circuit in 1953. Bunda Street was one of four new streets developed to support the proposed Brisbane Buildings retail development. Leases for the first shop sites were auctioned off in March of that year. From its inception, Bunda Street was a focal point for entertainment in the city, with an existing cinema complex modified and its lease amended to allow for an entrance from the new street.

The Monaro Mall (now part of the Canberra Centre) opened in 1963 with retail frontage on Bunda Street. It was Australia's first fully-enclosed, multi-story, air-conditioned shopping center.

Constructed in 1965 opening in 1966, the Cinema Center at 50 Bunda Street featured an architecturally significant cinema constructed in the basement beneath an office building, which was unique in Australia at the time. The building, designed by architect Enrico Taglietti originally included an art gallery space at street level and four floors of retail and office space above the cinema. It was heritage-listed in 2021.

In 1970, Gus Petersilka, proprietor of Gus's, a Viennese-style café on Bunda Street, introduced al fresco dining to Canberra. Despite objections by government authorities over the placement of awnings and furniture on the footpath, Petersilka was able to have regulations amended to allow this idea to spread throughout the city. Gus's cafe became a Canberra icon, with the sidewalk space outside the former cafe subject to protections under an ACT Heritage listing. A brass plaque was installed in the pavement of Bunda Street in 1998 to commemorate Petersilka and his contributions to establishing Canberra's vibrant dining scene.

An explosion in the underground cinema on 10 February 1977 killed one man and seriously injured another. The explosion was caused by a build up of hydrocarbons seeping into groundwater from a Mobil petrol station on the opposite side of Bunda Street. The two men were plumbers, who had been working to repair pumps in the underground complex when sparks from a welder ignited fumes. Rescue efforts were hampered by clouds of smoke and toxic fumes that spilled onto the street outside the complex. The operators of the cinema had been given assurances by Mobil engineers and government authorities that the fumes were not from petroleum products and were not explosive just weeks before.

The extension of Bunda Street from Akuna Street through Glebe Park was approved by the Commonwealth in 1980. This extension, along with the yet to be named Binara Street, would form a link to Constitution Avenue and formalise the park boundary. At the Canberra premiere of Phar Lap in August 1983, the Canberra Racing Club staged a parade of period costumes, racehorses, jockeys and 1930s vehicles along Bunda Street.

At around 4am on 5 February 2023, National Rugby League players Jack Wighton and Latrell Mitchell were arrested on allegations of fighting in Bunda Street after being asked to leave a nightclub. ACT Police charged both men with fighting in a public place and ordered Wighton to leave the public area of Bunda Street, adding additional charges for ignoring an exclusion order when he did not. All charges against both men, who are cousins and were celebrating Wighton's birthday together, were dismissed in court when CCTV and police body-cams showed the events alleged by police never occurred. The case attracted significant national media attention, with the exonerating video footage made public. Their lawyers claimed the incident only became violent after police used excessive force against the men.

=== Conversion to shared zone ===
In 2013, the ACT Government invited public consultation on three proposals for major redevelopment of Bunda Street. Each of the proposals focussed on creating a shared zone, reduced speed limits, and improved facilities to prioritise pedestrians and cycling. By December 2014, work on the final design was completed between Mort Street and Petrie Plaza, removing line markings, reducing the speed limit to 20 km/h (12 mph) and giving pedestrians right of way. During further works in 2015, an artwork depicting a flock of gang-gang cockatoos by local artist Geoffrey Filmer was installed in the pavement of the Bunda Street shared zone.

Bunda Street facing approximately northwest from Akuna Street	Bunda Street facing southeast with the Canberra Centre visible on left
