= ACT Memorial =

Australian war memorial

Coordinates: 35°16′51″S 149°7′54″E

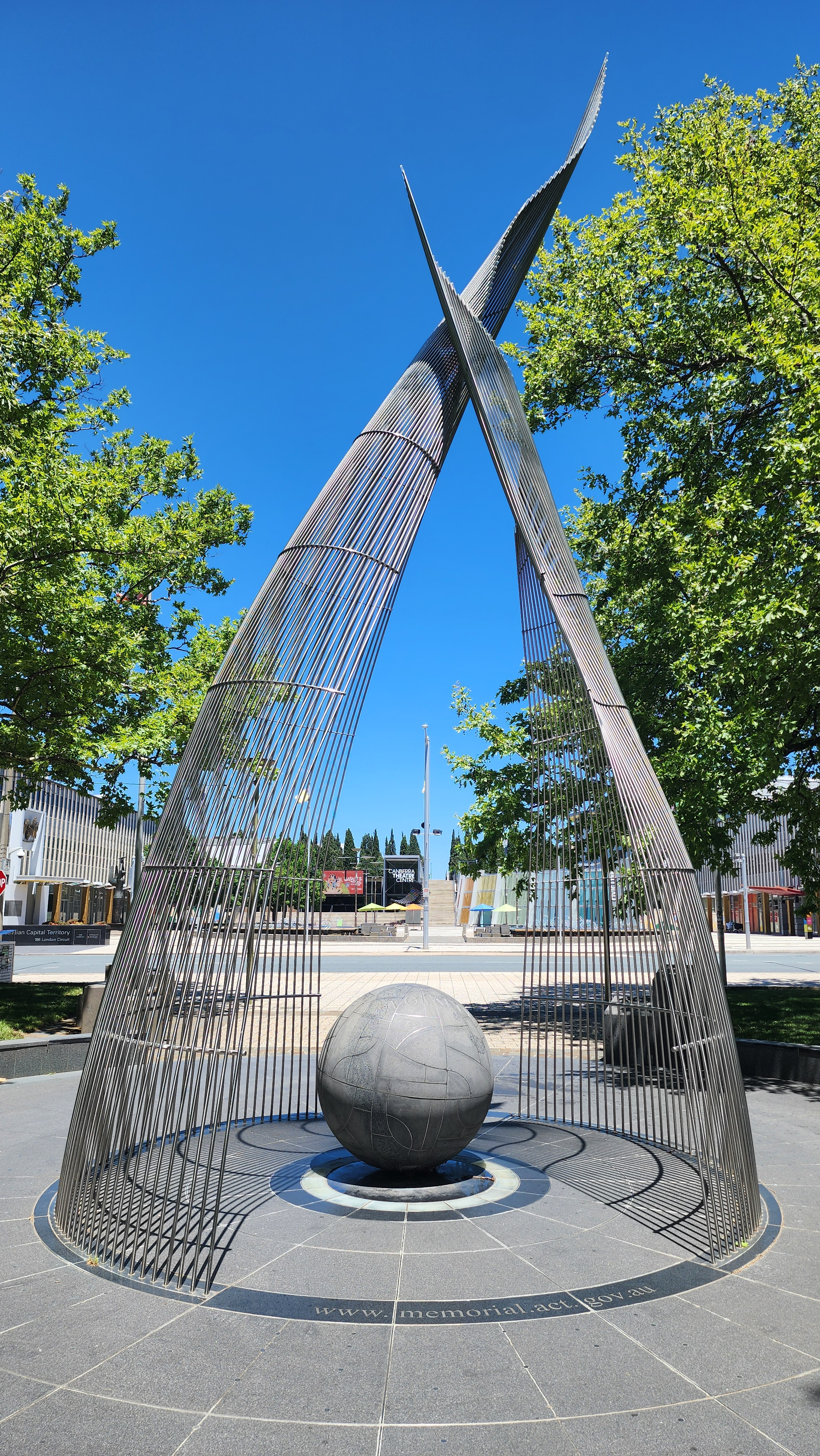
The ACT Memorial with London Circuit, Canberra Theatre and the ACT Legislative Assembly in the background

The ACT Memorial is an Australian war memorial honouring men and women associated with the Australian Capital Territory who served in a number of conflicts and peacekeeping missions throughout the world.

== Overview ==
Located in Canberra, on London Circuit, opposite Civic Square, the ACT Memorial consists of two primary components: a physical memorial, and a web site providing public access to a database of names and information about those honoured by the memorial. The memorial was dedicated on 10 August 2006 by the ACT Chief Minister, Mr Jon Stanhope MLA.

== Design ==
The ACT Memorial was designed by local Canberra artist Matthew Harding. It consists of a central illuminated glass sphere which is encompassed by two large stylised wing or feather structures which consist of a number of stainless steel bands. Text on one side of the outer rim at the base of the memorial reads "ACT MEMORIAL" and on the opposite side is the URL for the associated web site. On the inner rim under the sphere there are a series of glass tiles with key words related to conflict and sacrifice, such as "peace", "dedication", "resolve", "service", "honour", etc.
