= Keizo Ushio =

Japanese sculptor

- 牛尾啓三
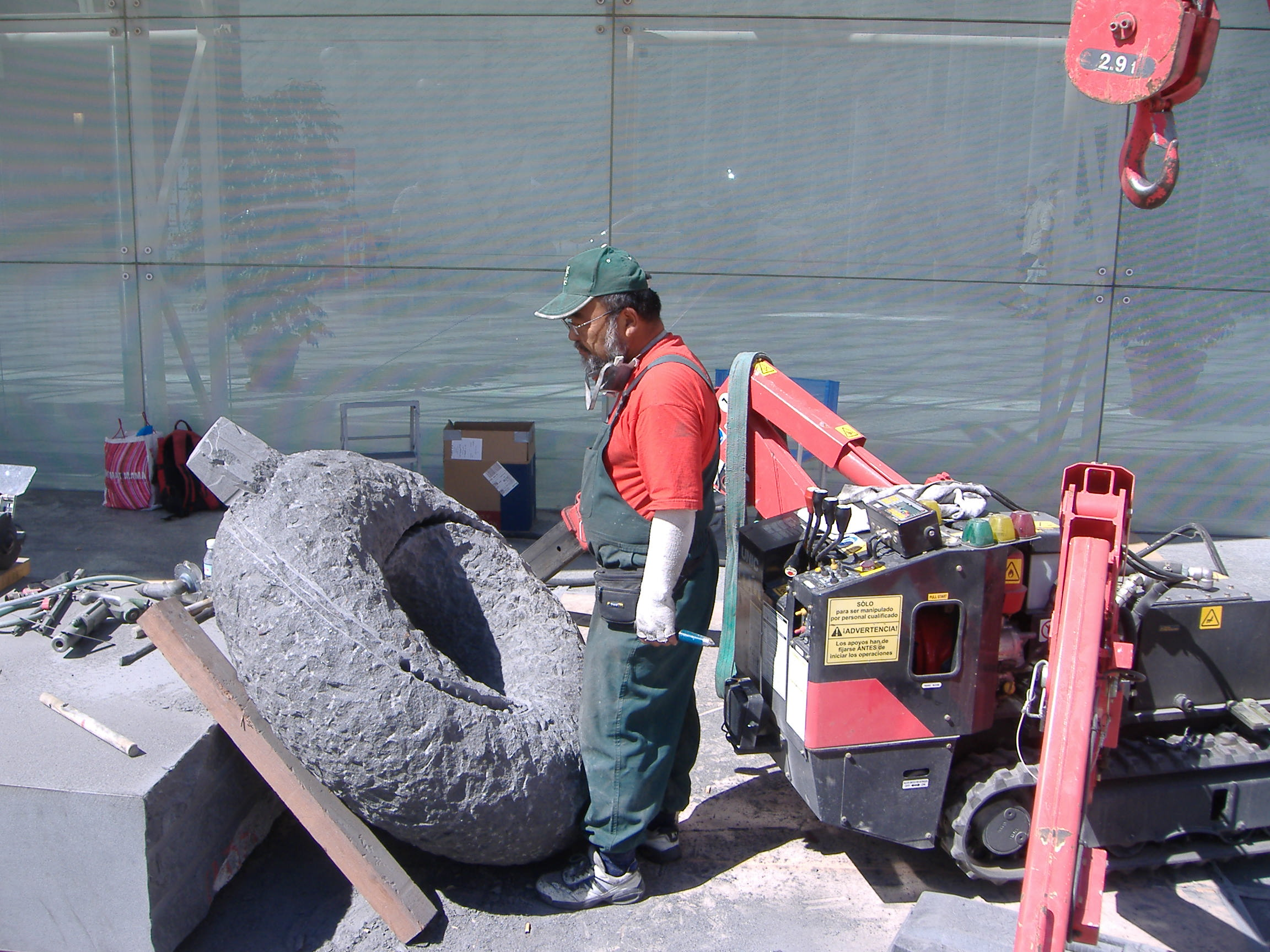
- Keizo Ushio at work in Madrid, 2006
- Born: 1951 (age 74–75); Fukusaki, Japan
- Education: Kyoto University
- Occupation: Sculptor

Keizo Ushio (Japanese: 牛尾啓三; born 1951) is a Japanese sculptor.

== Biography ==
Keizo Ushio was born in Fukusaki, Hyōgo, Japan, in 1951. He graduated from Kyoto City University of Arts in 1976.

Ushio's sculptures are made from granite. They have one sides and are based on möbius strips.

== Selected works ==
Ushio has contributed to the annual Australian Sculpture by the Sea exhibitions since 1999.

In 2009 the City of Perth Art Foundation bought the oushi zokei, mobius in space, sculpture from that year's Sculpture by the Sea exhibition. The following year the sculpture was unveiled at The Esplanade railway station. It is 170cm x 170cm x 80cm and made with pink granite and red ochre.

The sculpture Flight is at the entrance of the Vibe Hotel at Canberra Airport in Australia.

== Gallery ==
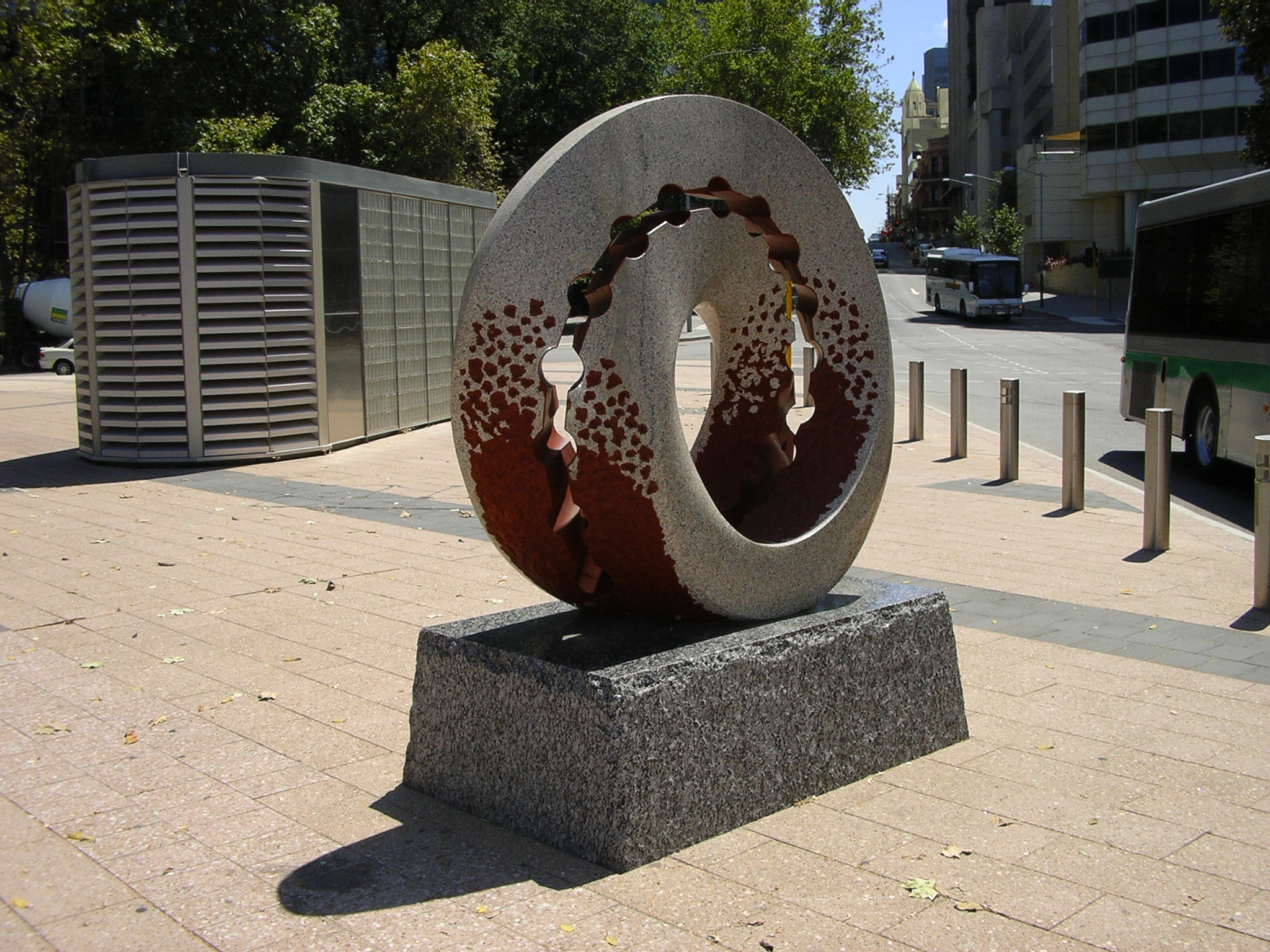
Mobius in Space, in Perth

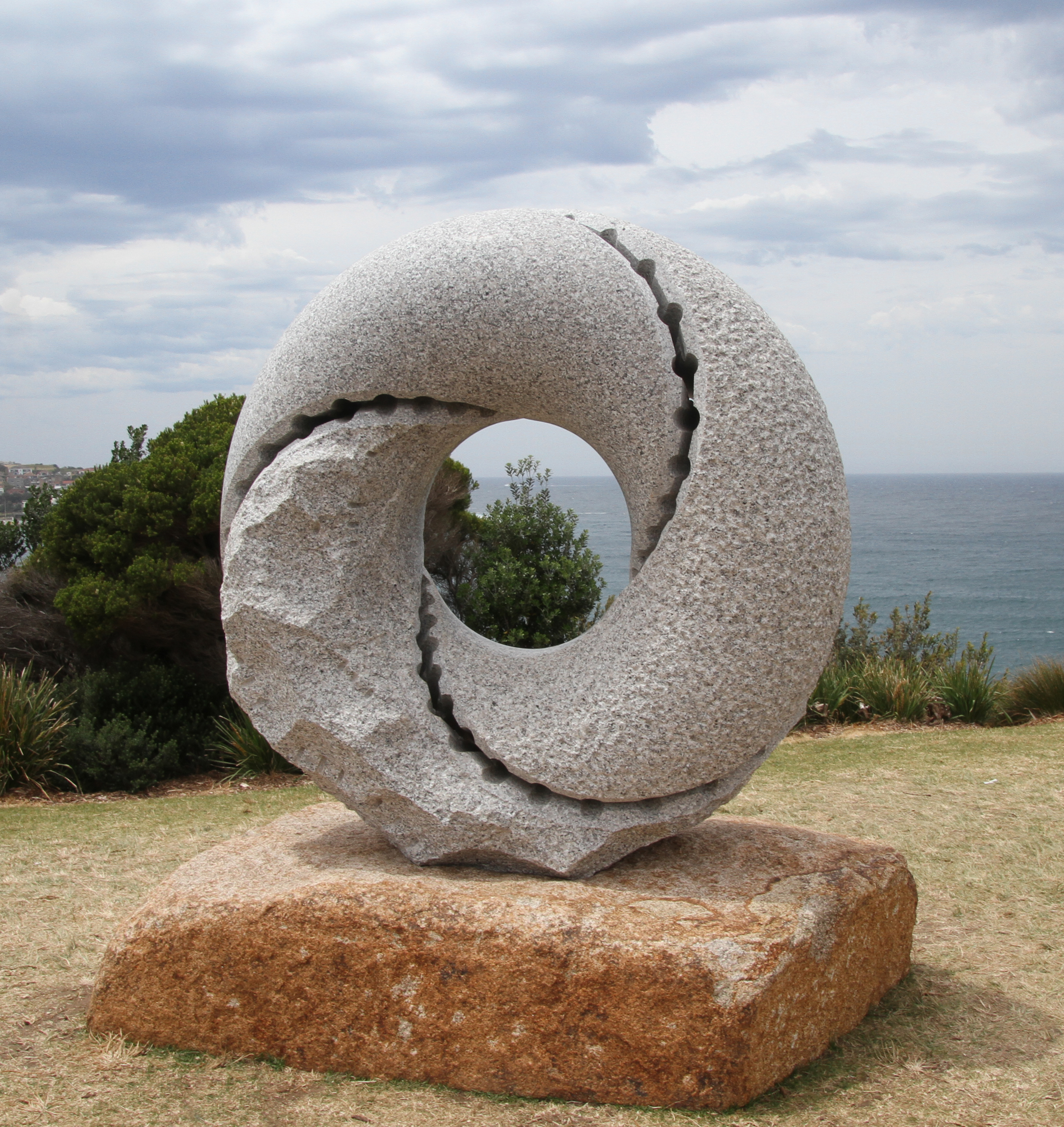
The sculpture in Tamarama, New South Wales, Australia

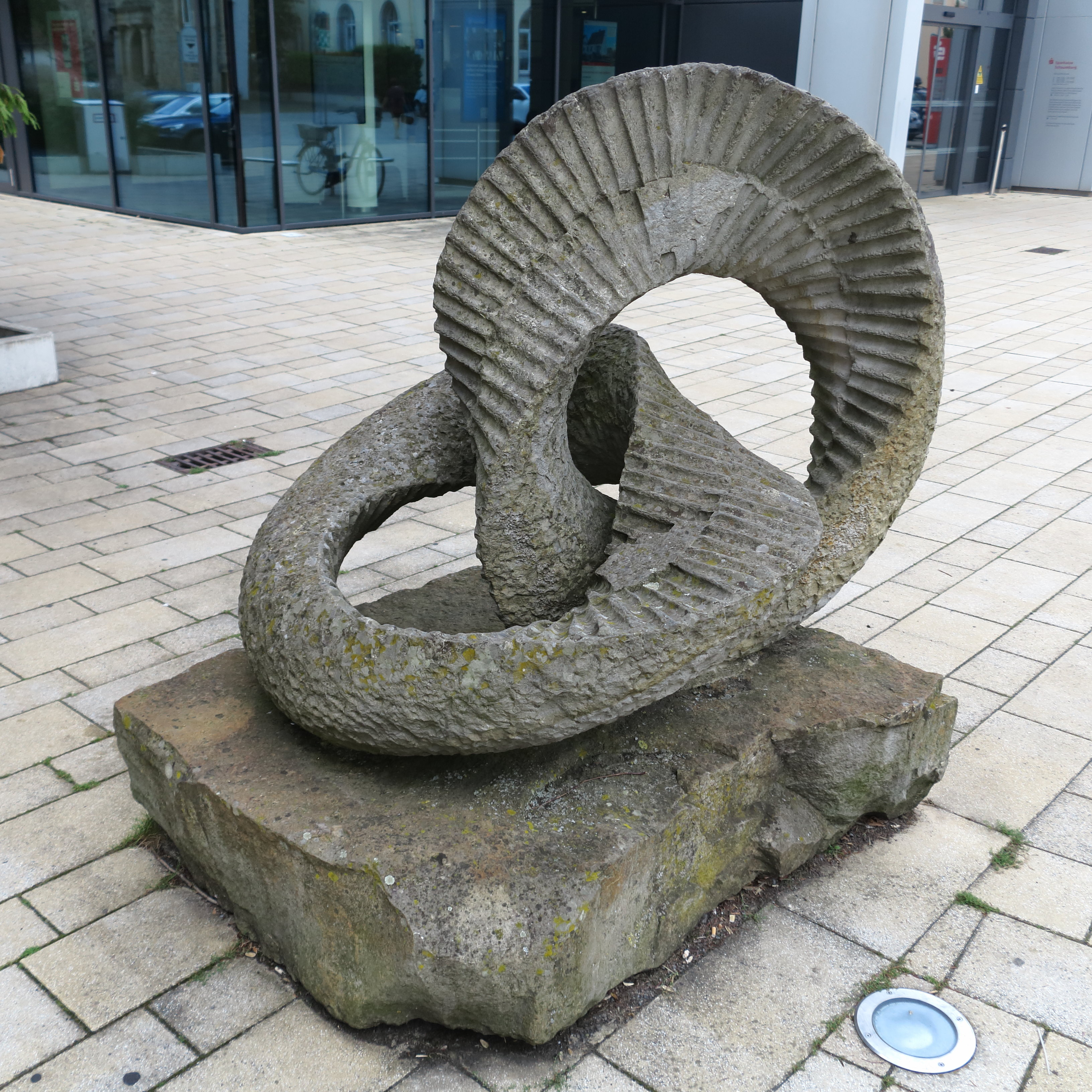
The sculpture "Oushi-Zoukei" in Bückeburg, Germany

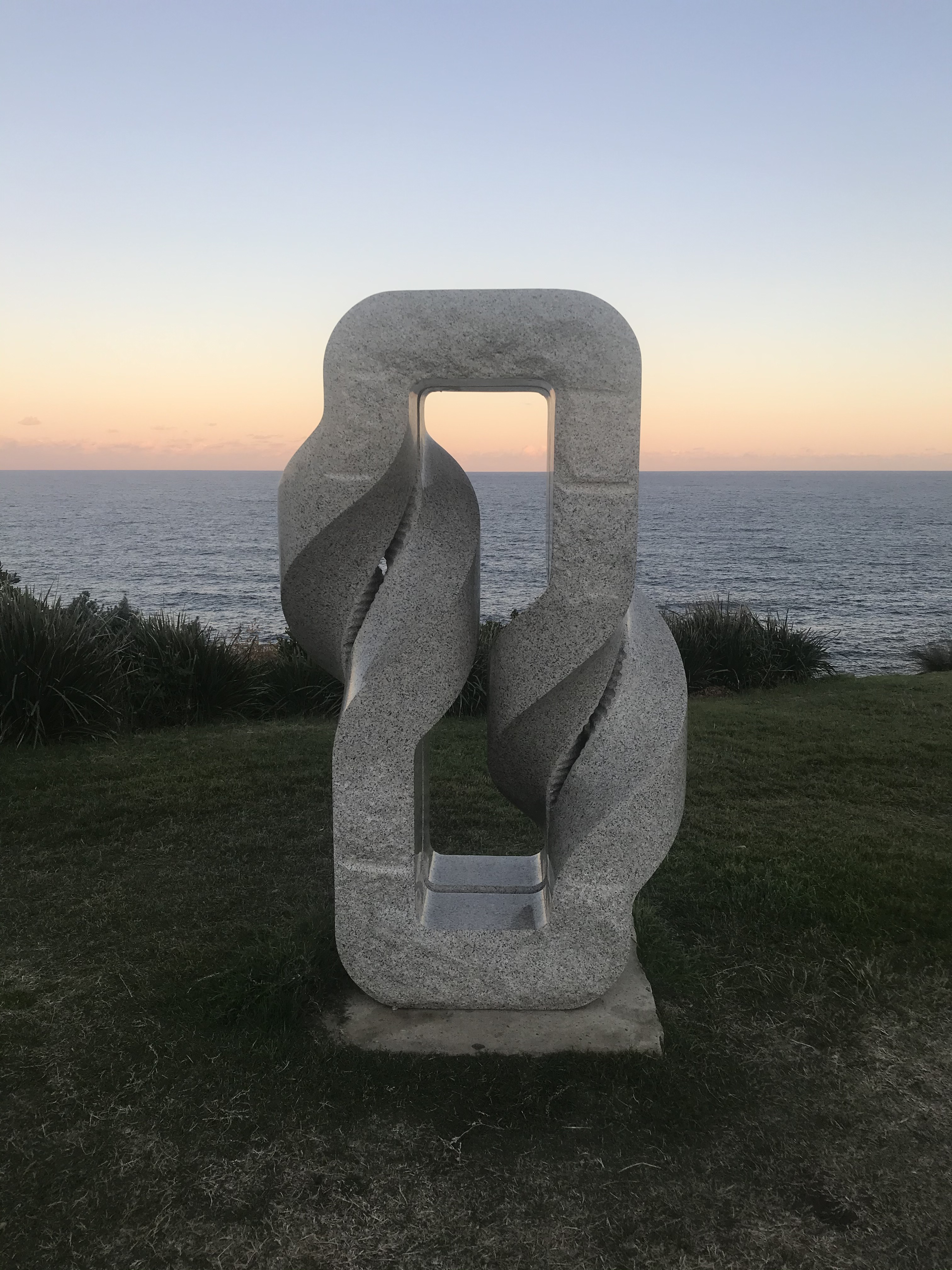
"Twice Twist Bands", sculpture by the sea, 2012
