= Canberra Centre =

Shopping mall in Canberra, Australia

Coordinates: 35°16′50″S 149°08′0″E

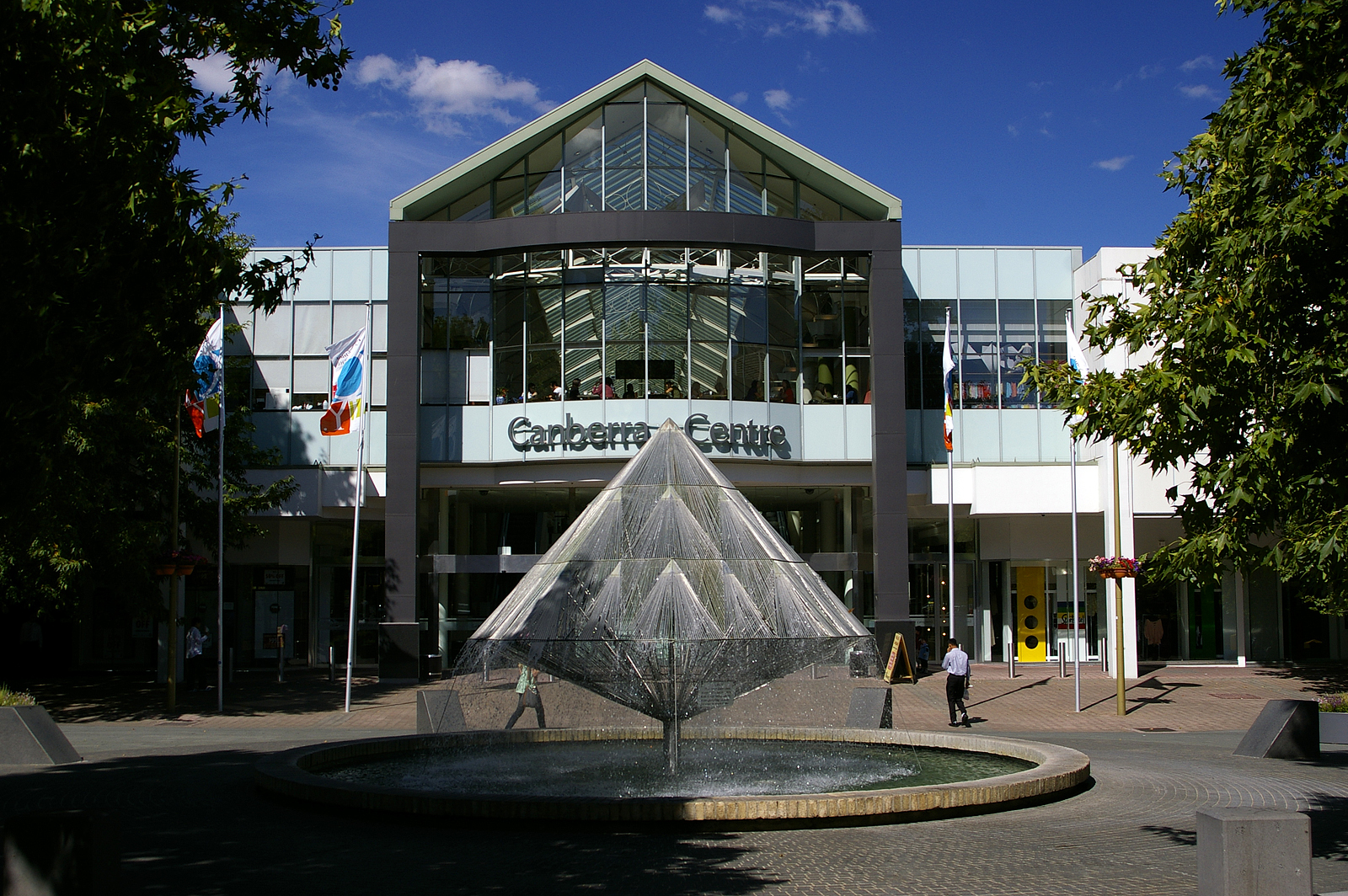
- Canberra Centre City Walk entrance
- Location: 148 Bunda Street, Civic, Canberra
- Opened: 6 March 1963; 63 years ago
- Owner: Queensland Investment Corporation
- Num. of stores: 403
- Num. of anchor tenants: 5
- Floor area: 94,259 m^{2} (1,014,595 sq ft)
- Floors: 4
- Website: canberracentre.com.au

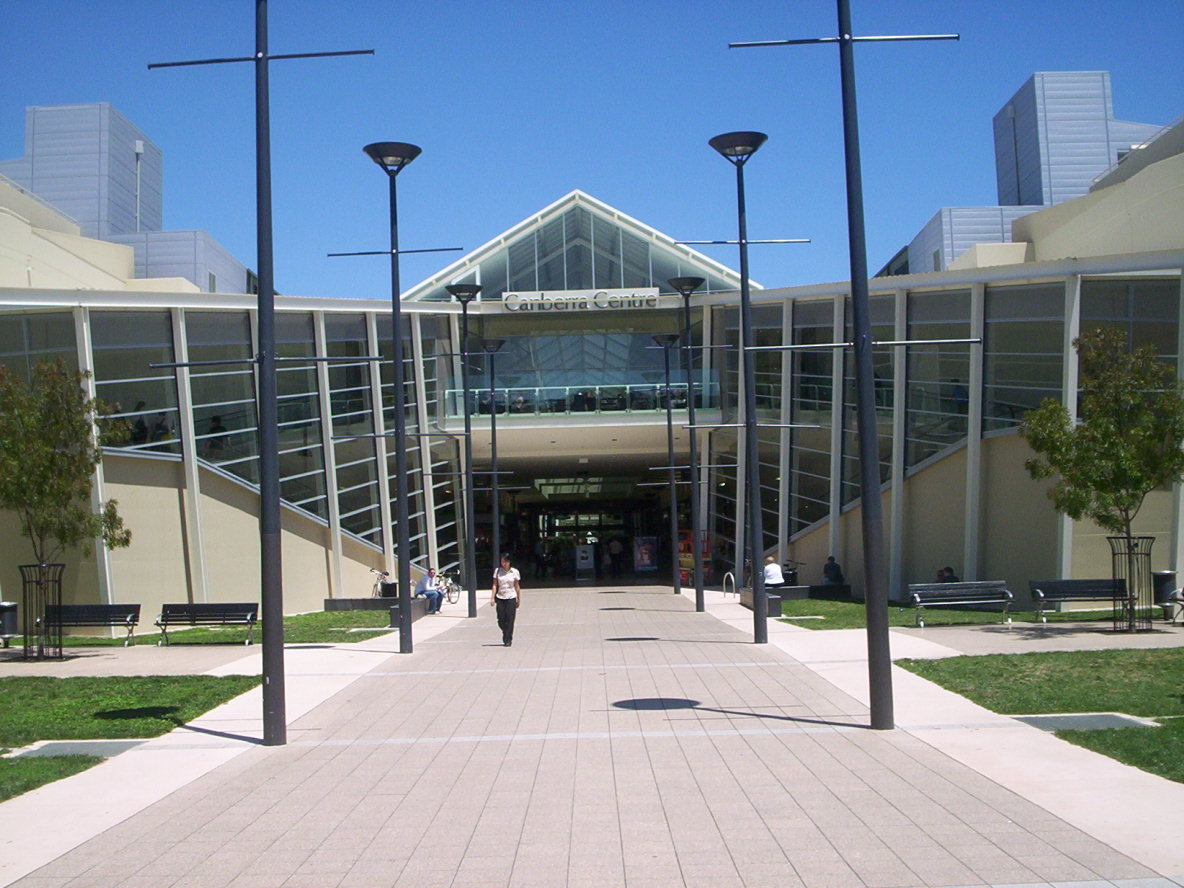
The front of the Canberra Centre on Ainslie Avenue

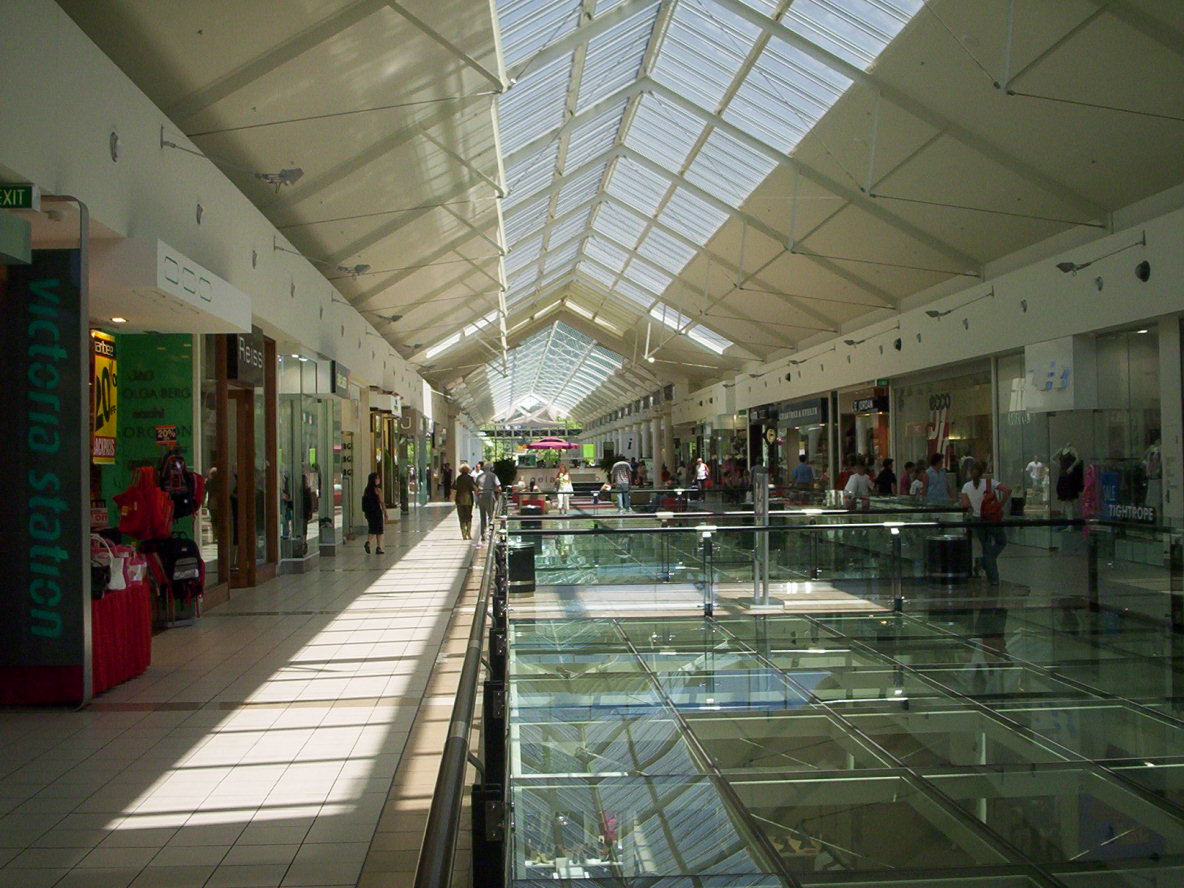
Upper level of the Canberra Centre, 2003

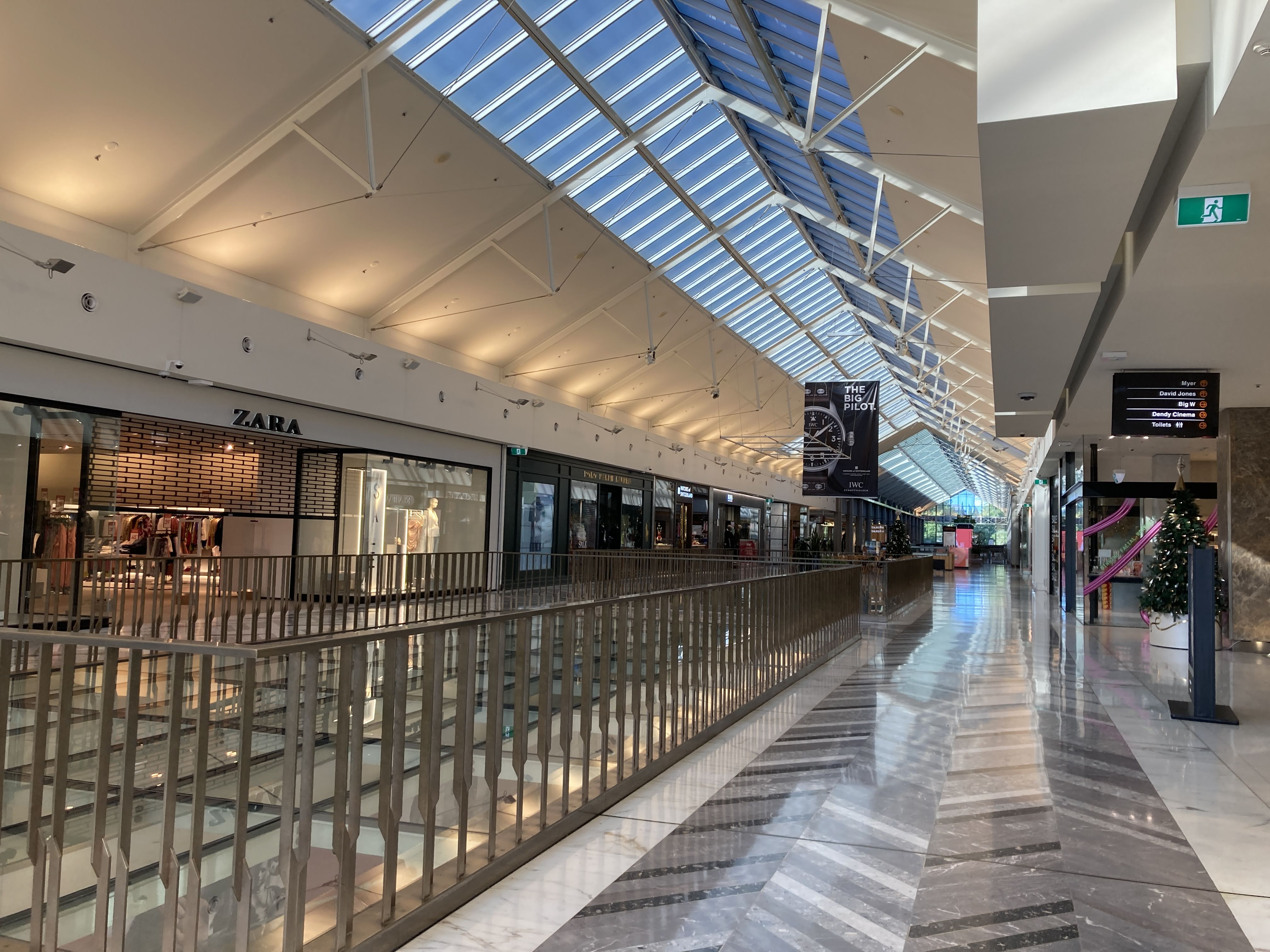
Upper level of Canberra Centre, 2023

The Canberra Centre, also known by the longer name Canberra Shopping Centre, is a large shopping centre located in the northern section of the Canberra City Centre, Australian Capital Territory, Australia, being the second largest centre in the Australian Capital Territory, behind Westfield Belconnen. It opened on 6 March 1963 as the Monaro Mall, becoming the first in Australia to contain three floors and be fully enclosed, though would later expand to cover a substantial outdoor component on Garema Place. The Canberra Centre spans six city blocks and has three skybridges.

It was designated an Australian Capital Historic Site in 1997. It underwent a $220 million redevelopment and became the Canberra Centre in 1989. It was the first shopping centre in Canberra to have a car park operated by ticket machines. As at December 2020, Canberra Centre was 94,259 m^{2} in size with over 403 retailers.

== History ==
Prime Minister Robert Menzies opened the original shopping centre, known as the Monaro Mall, on 6 March 1963. At the time it was the first Australian three-storey, fully enclosed and air conditioned shopping centre. with David Jones, Marcus Clark & Company, Coles New World Supermarket, McEwans hardware (now closed) and 58 speciality shops. The centre was expanded and rebranded as Canberra Centre and was opened officially by Rosemary Follett on 2 November 1989. The Canberra Centre was designed by Canberra-based Geoff Butterworth and Partners, in conjunction with Sydney mall architects Drummond and Rosen. Canberra Centre originally consisted of four city blocks: David Jones, Myer, City Market (a fresh food precinct) and Target. To access either City Market or Target, you had to either exit the main atrium and cross Bunda Street or access via the now-demolished travelators that ran parallel to Ainslie Avenue from the car parks.

At this time, Canberra Centre was owned and managed by Canberra Advance Bank, which later became St George Bank. In 1992, the Queensland Investment Corporation purchased a 50% shareholding. In 1993 the old Bunda Street entrance was aligned diagonally to be on the corner of Petrie Plaza and Bunda Street. Another extension occurred in 1993 of the Upper Floor fashion atrium, where Pumpkin Patch was. It was not until 2002 when a major expansion occurred, by extending the atrium by crossing over Bunda Street and closing Ainslie Avenue to allow access to City Market and Target without going outdoors. By this time, the original atrium was under refurbishment. The columns were painted in shades of white and dark green, replacing the previous watery-blue and maroon. Balustrades were re-fitted with stainless steel and painted black, replacing the brass and maroon. The Lower Ground Floor replaced all the brass and maroon chairs and tables, with plastic black and white ones. The Centre Court fountain was removed and replaced with a 360 TV. The centre clock, which ran up 3 levels, was removed due to being maroon and brass. All the toilets were refurbished and centre signage was replaced, again due to being brass letters on maroon wood.

Further expansions were completed in late 2006, this time closing half of the City Market Car Park and City Market for retail space. The new mall added another 100 stores, a second food court and relocated City Market (now called the Fresh Food Precinct). On the northern end of Bunda Street, Canberra Centre's new dining and entertainment precinct, North Quarter houses restaurants on street level and indoor.

On 28 February 2007, a severe thunderstorm known as a supercell passed over Canberra causing flash flooding, severe hail and property damage. The Canberra Centre along with the Australian National University and Campbell High School sustained heavy damage with flooding and damage to internal fit out. Severe damage was inflicted on most parts of the centre including the brand new expansion. The first sign of trouble for those inside the centre came when water began pouring from the ceiling of the Dendy Cinema. After ten minutes, staff began a hasty evacuation. Borders (now closed) also sustained heavy damage and flooding.

In mid 2013 the lower ground level food court was closed due to its refurbishment that will finish late 2013. The David Jones lower ground level closed as well. Myer lower ground level continued to open. On Thursday 31 October 2013 the new Refurbished Lower Level Food Court was opened so as the Myer and David Jones lower ground.

In July 2017, a renovated section of the Canberra Centre known as Monaro Mall reopened as the Beauty precinct with brands like Jurlique, Lush, Crabtree & Evelyn, Mecca Maxima, Inglot, L'Occitane en Provence, Aveda.

New fashion brands H&M, Gorman, and Calvin Klein were also opened in 2017.

End of 2018 and 2019 saw new brands like Superdry, Nike, The North Face, Vans and Levi's open stores on the lower level on the mall.
