= Petrie Plaza =

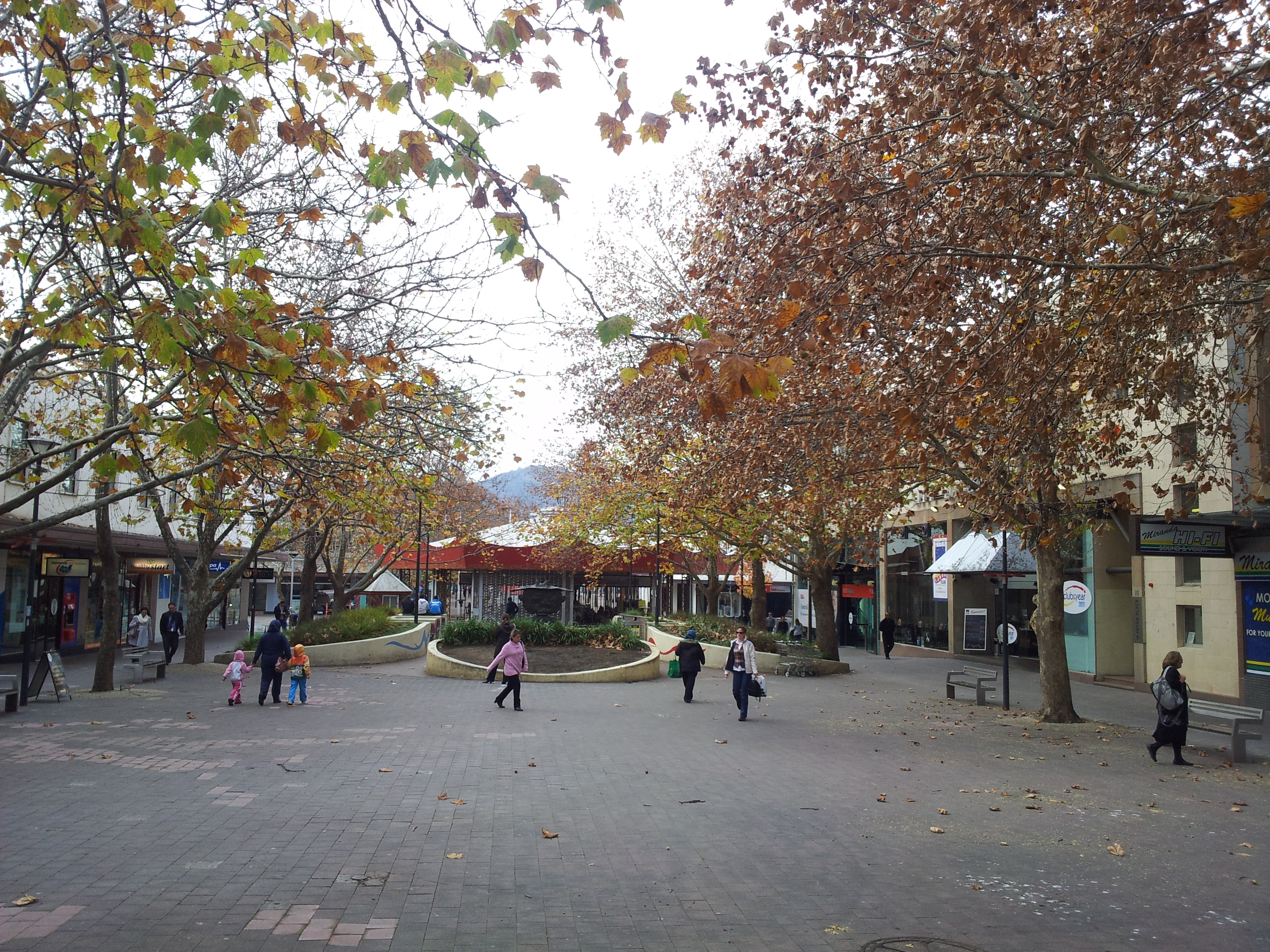
Petrie Plaza in June 2012

Petrie Plaza is a pedestrian mall located in Civic, Australian Capital Territory (Canberra City), Australia, being the largest centre within the Australian Capital Territory.

Petrie Plaza was created in the early 1970s from pedestrianising part of Petrie Street, which is a road running between London Circuit and Bunda Street.

== History ==
Petrie Street and Petrie Plaza are named after the Petrie family from Queensland. The street has been closely associated with business and banking in Canberra due to the location of many corporations in this area. In the 1960s, those that lived on acreage in the outskirts of Canberra and travelled into the city for work were called 'Petrie Street farmers'

The street was partially closed to vehicular traffic in 1965 to create Petrie Plaza, although not all residents were proponents of the change.

Parts of Petrie Street were closed in 2015 to construct the shareway.

The Liam Neeson movie Blacklight was filmed in Canberra and required the closure of Petrie Street and Petrie Plaza.
