= Marrianne Collinson Campbell =

Australian botanical illustrator

Marrianne Collinson Campbell (30 June 1827 – 2 May 1903) was an Australian botanical illustrator and diarist.

== Biography ==
Marrianne Collinson Campbell (née Close) was born on 30 June 1827 in Morpeth in the Hunter Valley of New South Wales to Edward Charles Close and Sophia Susanna Close (née Palmer).

Marrianne Collinson Campbell
- Born: Marrianne Collinson Close; 30 June 1827; Morpeth, New South Wales
- Died: 2 May 1903 (aged 75); Duntroon, ACT
- Resting place: St John the Baptist Church, Reid
- Known for: Painting
- Partner: George Campbell

She was named after her paternal grandmother, Marrianne Collinson, and was the great great granddaughter to notable botanist Peter Collinson. She was known as Minnie by her family. Campbell's father, Lieutenant Close, was an officer of the 48th Regiment who fought in Spain, Portugal, and France. He arrived in Sydney in August 1817 and served in the Army four more years before marrying Sophia in 1821 and settling at Green Hills. Marrianne was the only surviving daughter of her parents' nine children, along with her brothers Edward, Robert, and George.

As with many of the colonial ladies of the era such as Annabella Boswell and Fanny Macleay, Campbell received lessons in drawing and painting, being educated by the professional artist Conrad Martens. Her great aunt Sophia Campbell nurtured her work when she visited her at Wharf House in Sydney as a young girl. When her father resigned from the Army he settled on the land he had been granted, originally known as Illalaung, with one third of this land becoming the town of Morpeth on the Hunter River.

She met George Campbell, her first cousin once removed, when he visited Newcastle. They married in Morpeth on 24 August 1854. They lived at Wharf House when they were first married where Marrianne gave birth to their first son, John, in 1855. Although George had inherited his father's property of Duntroon some years earlier, it was being managed by his brother Charles until George decided to take up residence there in 1860.

Marrianne's involvement with the house and its grounds was extensive. An extension to the house, as well as its cottages and outbuildings, were designed by her. Her great love was overseeing the garden where she ensured a tree was planted there from every country that the Campbell family's shipping line went to. The Campbells were patrons of St John's Church in Canberra, built by George's father Robert, and entertained many clergymen at Duntroon. When they found out the Sunday services were not well attended they gave their servants a half-holiday to be able to attend.

Headstone of Marrianne Collinson Campbell at St John the Baptist Church, Reid

While Marrianne spent much of her time tending and cultivating her garden, she also painted the flowers. Her surviving sketchbook depicts many flowers native to Australia and reflects her passion for orchids. The only known public exhibiting of her work was a community bazaar held by Mr and Mrs George Campbell at Duntroon. Marrianne painted what she encountered; her husband George raised and showed horses and these horses are depicted by his wife in the landscape. George would host shows of sheep and horses at their property.

Unusual for a woman of that era was that Marrianne was very involved with the designing of plans for works at Duntroon and its buildings. The stables and coach house were both designed by her as well as the Gothic-inspired extensions to the main house. When Robert Campbell's original bungalow became inadequate for their needs, Marrianne designed a grand new two-storeyed house complete with four bedrooms, a breakfast room, a library, a morning room, and a study.

She was known as "Lady Bountiful" for the kindness with which she treated her community. Marrianne and George sailed the long journey to England with their family in 1876 for their children's schooling. George was never to return to Duntroon, dying in 1881. Duntroon was the social centre of the growing district and both their employees and neighbours held the Campbells in high regard. The station hands gathered and cheered when Mrs Campbell returned home from England, and indeed they had many workers who were employed by the estate for their whole lives. Marrianne also taught Sunday school, and her students presented her with a bowl that still survives today. She would host picnics for local schools and balls for her staff.

Wild flowers, fruit and butterflies of Australia by Marrianne Collinson Campbell, National Library of Australia

Elaeocarpus obovatus (Hard quandong), [and unidentified wild fruit [picture] / by Marrianne Collinson Campbell

Moreton Bay Bignonia i.e. Pandorea jasminoides, Diplarrena moraea, Callistemon (Bottlebrushes), Genetyllis tulipifera [picture / by Marrianne Collinson Campbell

[Dianella caerulea, Joycea pallida, Diuris maculata, Centaurium spicatum [picture] / by Marrianne Collinson Campbell

[Agonis marginata with six other species [picture] / by Marrianne Collinson Campbell

[Banksia praemorsa, Chorizema rhombeum and Patersonia occidentalis [picture] / by Marrianne Collinson Campbell

Wahlenbergia gracilis [with five other species [picture] / by Marrianne Collinson Campbell
