= Glebe Park, Canberra =

Park in Canberra, Australia

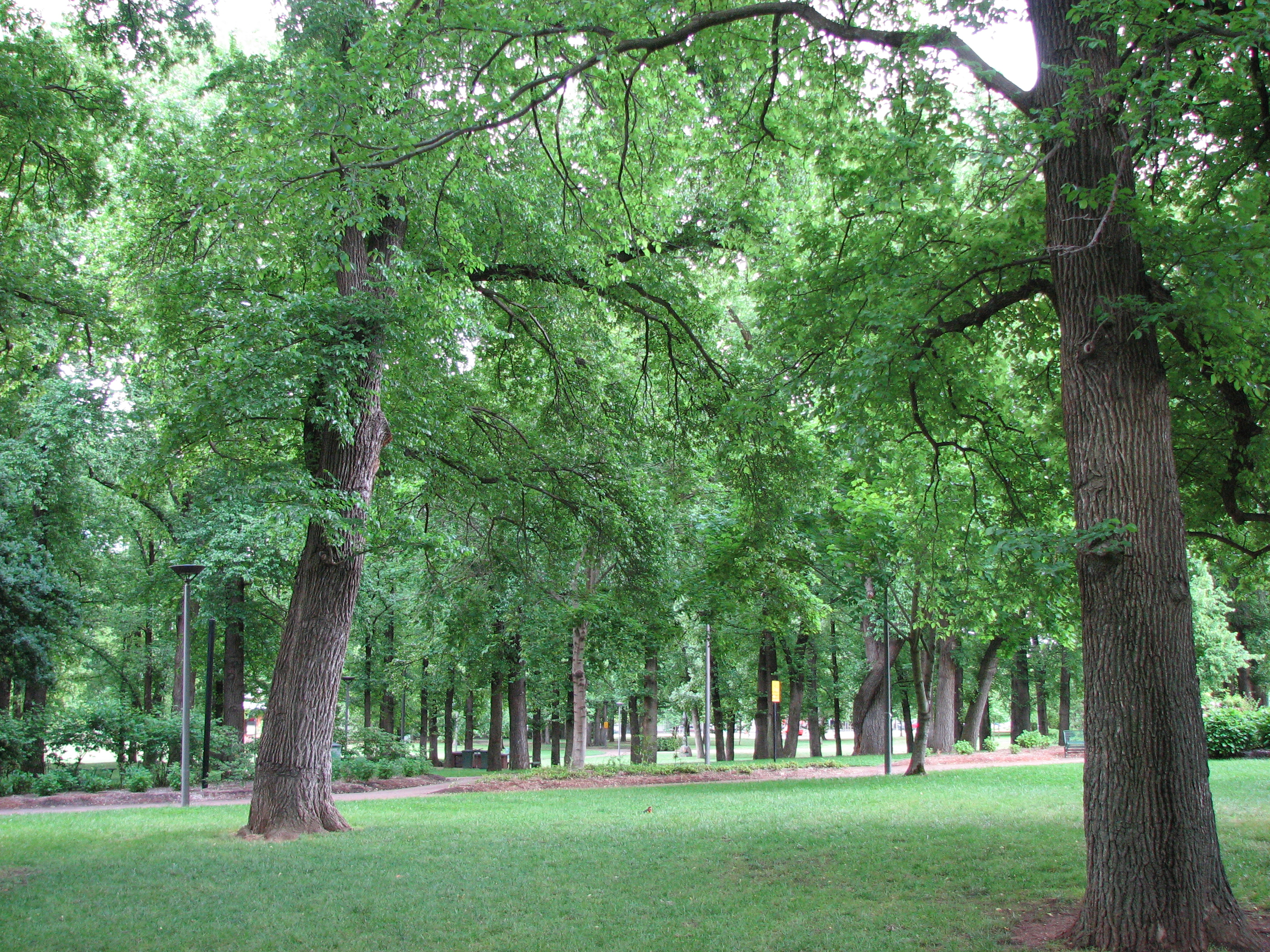
- Glebe Park in early November. By far the largest group of trees in the park are the English elm.
- Interactive map of Glebe Park, Canberra
- Location: Civic, Australian Capital Territory
- Coordinates: 35°16′54″S 149°8′9″E
- Area: 40 hectares (99 acres)

Glebe Park is a public park on the eastern side of Civic, Canberra, Australia. The park is bounded by Coranderrk, Ballumbir, Akuna, and Bunda Streets, and to the south, the National Convention Centre.

== History ==
Glebe Park is a remnant of a hundred acres (40 hectares) of land allocated by Robert Campbell to the Anglican Church in the early 1840s for use as a glebe, an area of land whose revenues contribute towards parish expenses. Campbell gave two acres (8,000 m²) of land to St John the Baptist Church in nearby Reid at the same time.

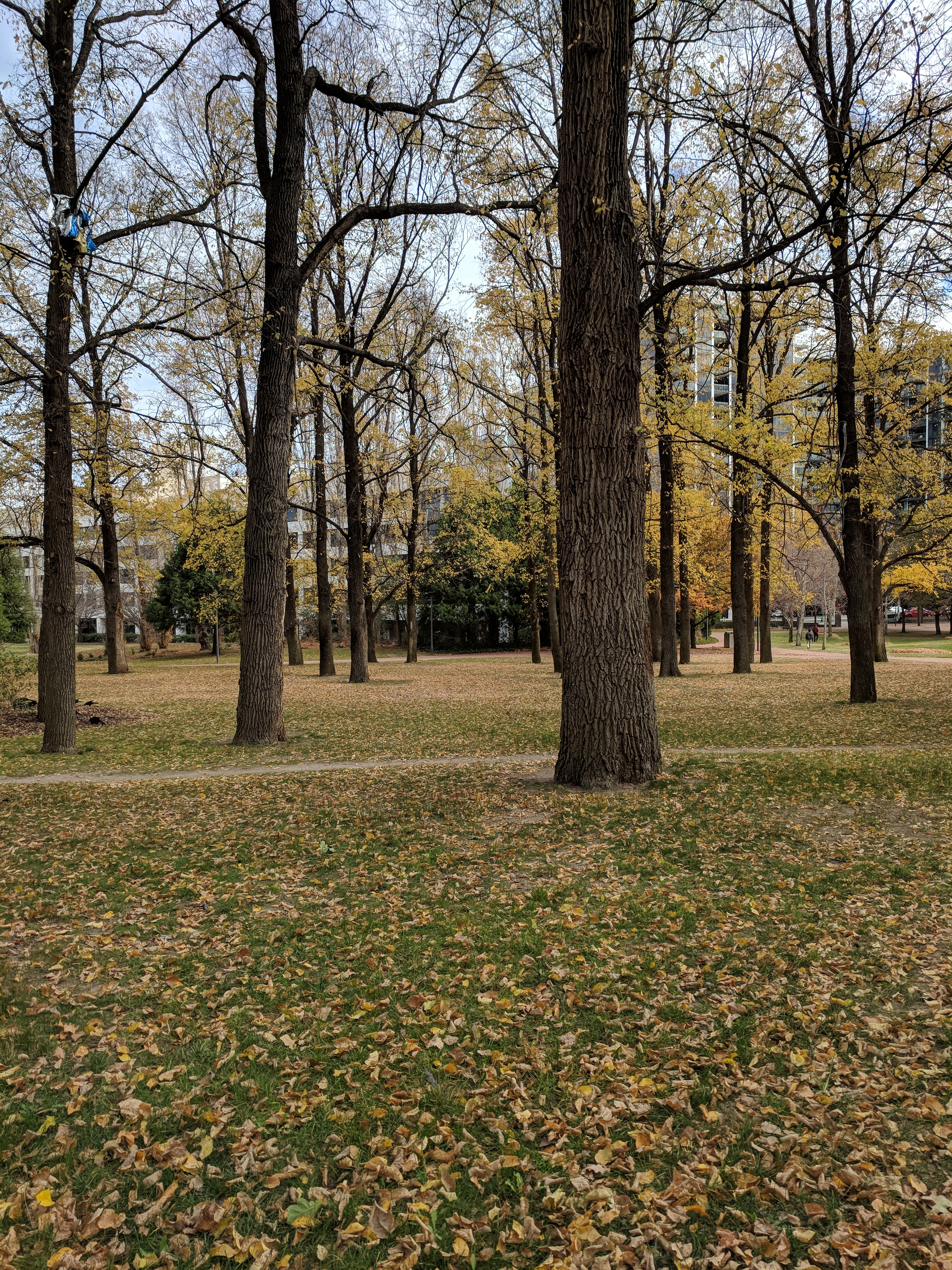
The park's deciduous trees lose their leaves in winter and provide strong autumn foliage colour

Glebe House was built in 1871-3 as a rectory for St John's church. It was a two storied house with a single storied veranda made of bricks from nearby swampland clay. The land was used as a farm to support the rector.

Elms, willows, and poplars were planted around the house by the Reverend Pierce Galliard Smith, who was Rector at St Johns for fifty-one years from 1855 until 1906. The elms in the park today are descended from his plantings with some survivors from one hundred years ago. Nearly seven hundred trees remain in the park, of which just over five hundred are English elms (Ulmus procera). About a hundred are English oaks (Quercus robur).

In 1912, when the decision had been made to site Australia's capital here, the land and building were resumed by the Commonwealth Government but was continued to be used as a rectory until a new rectory much closer to the church was built in 1926. From 1926 to early 1928 the Old Rectory at St Johns was leased from the Government by the Anglican religious order of the Community of the Sisters of the Church, or the Kilburn Sisters, to found St Gabriel's school which later became the Canberra Girls' Grammar School. The school moved into its Deakin premises on Melbourne Avenue in 1928.

Glebe House then served as a guest house for the next 25 years. By 1954 it was in a poor state of repair and there had been a number of additions that were not in harmony with the original building. The House also stood in the way of plans for the development of the city area. There was some protest at destroying a building associated with Canberra's early history and some discussion about alternate uses such as a residence for the aged. However, the building was sold by the Commonwealth government to the Acton Football Club. The club used the bricks to construct a clubhouse in Franklin Street, Forrest. A plaque was erected ten years later in Ballumbir Street, Reid, just to the south of St Peter's Lutheran Church, to mark the site of the former building.

== Recent history ==
In 1980, the Canberra Development Board proposed establishing the Canberra Tivoli Gardens on the site of Glebe Park. The proposal was for a major complex featuring entertainment and dining facilities, with an entry fee charged for admission. A community campaign to save the trees resulted in a park being proclaimed in 1983 and heritage listing by the National Trust of Australia (ACT) and the Australian Heritage Commission. Formal landscaping with fences, gates, paths, a rotunda, and a playground was completed in 1989. The park has ten gates, which are named after historic people or places. In the course of the landscaping, further land was excised for the building of the National Convention Centre, a casino and a hotel (at present, the Crowne Plaza). The present area is about 4.7 hectares, just under one eighth of the original area of the glebe.

=== Uses ===
A children's playground has now been built in the park.

In recent years outdoor art exhibitions have been staged in the park, notably during the Canberra Festival.

2017 saw the Canberra Christmas activation move from City Walk into the park for Christmas In Glebe Park, With a more family focused event running for 3 weekends and supporting Red Nose as the charity partner.

== Gallery ==
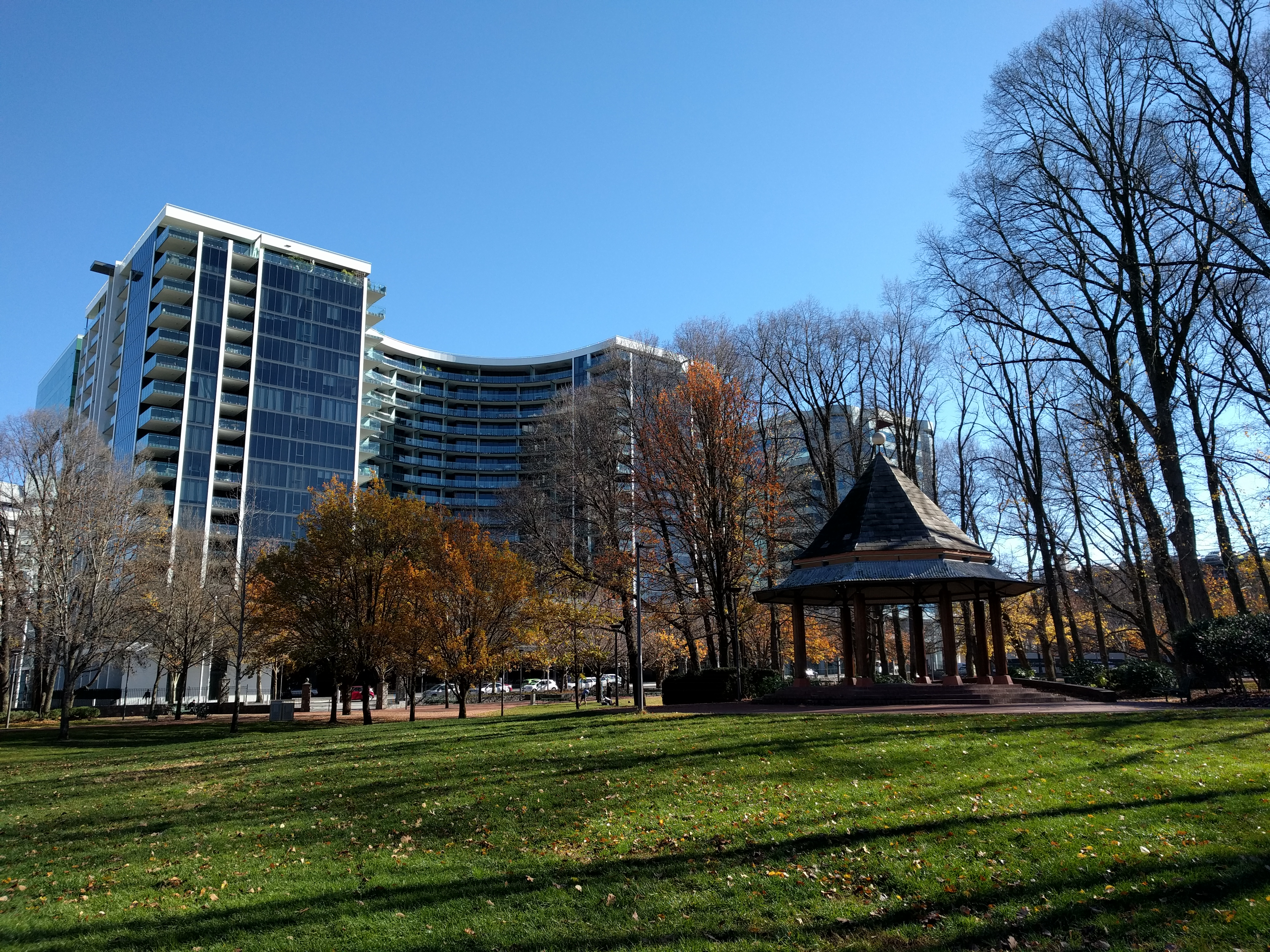
Part of Glebe Park, looking towards the Manhattan apartment building

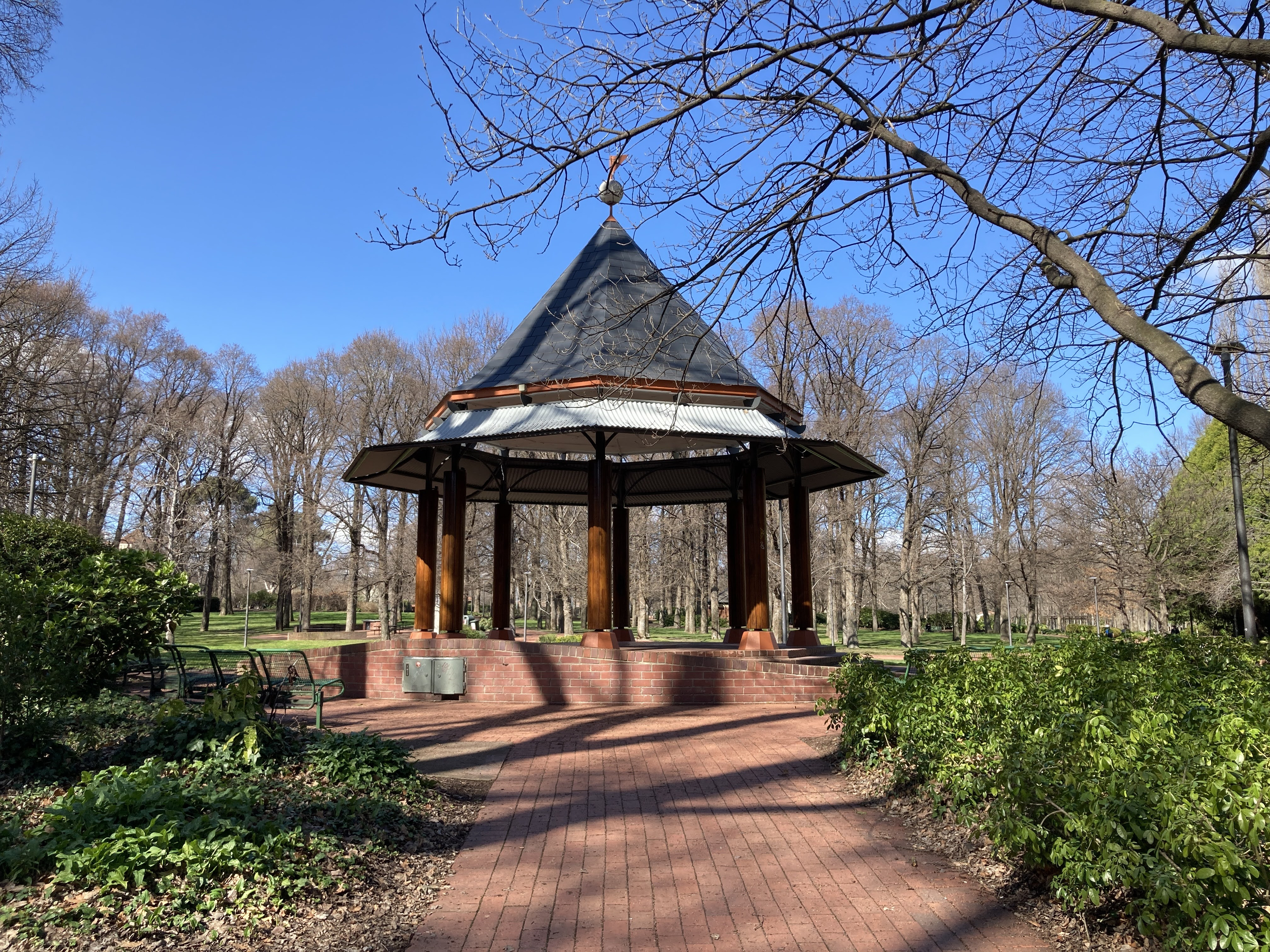
A gazebo built in 1989 is located at the centre of Glebe Park

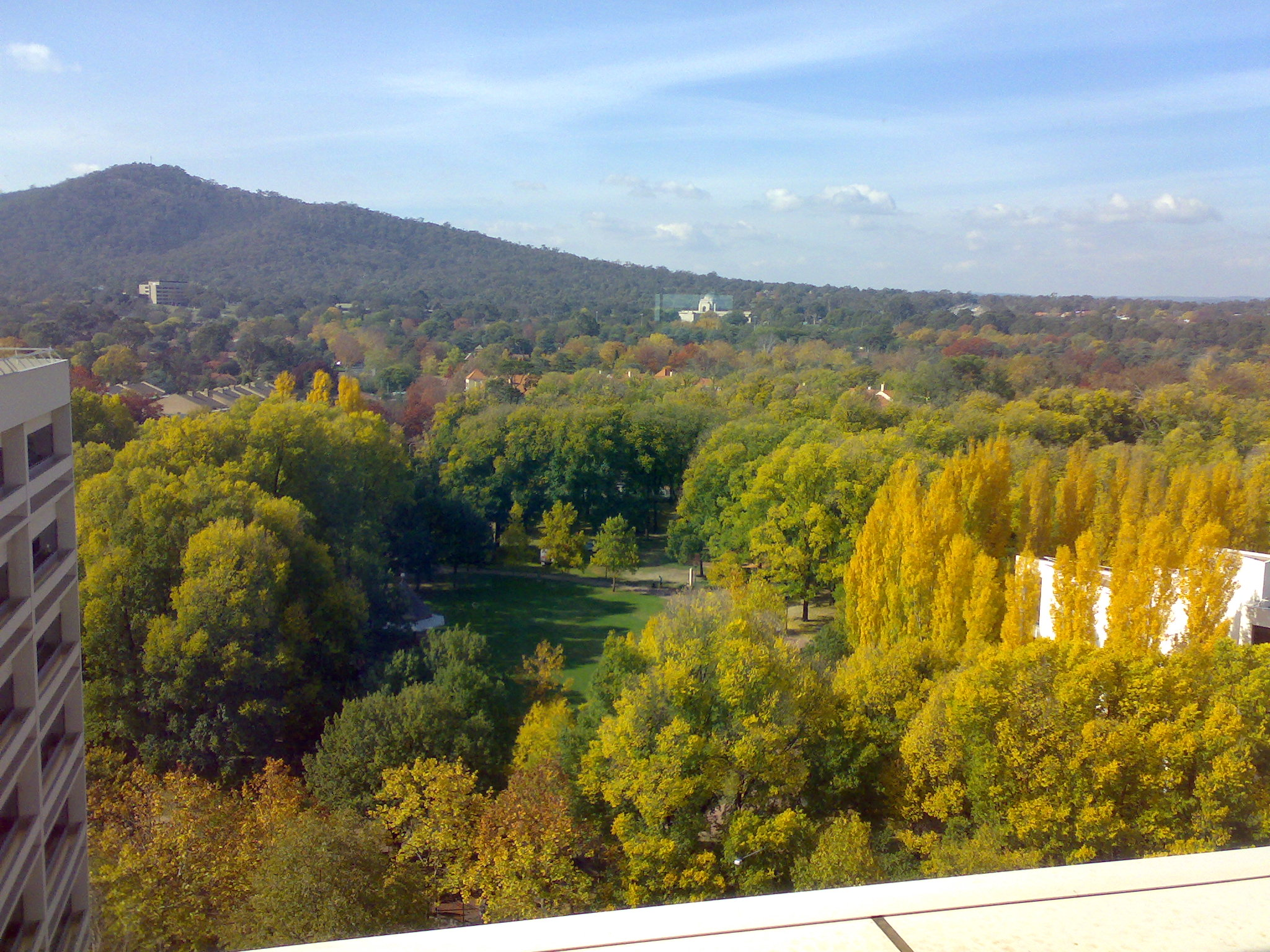
The park as viewed from above during autumn, looking out towards Mount Ainslie

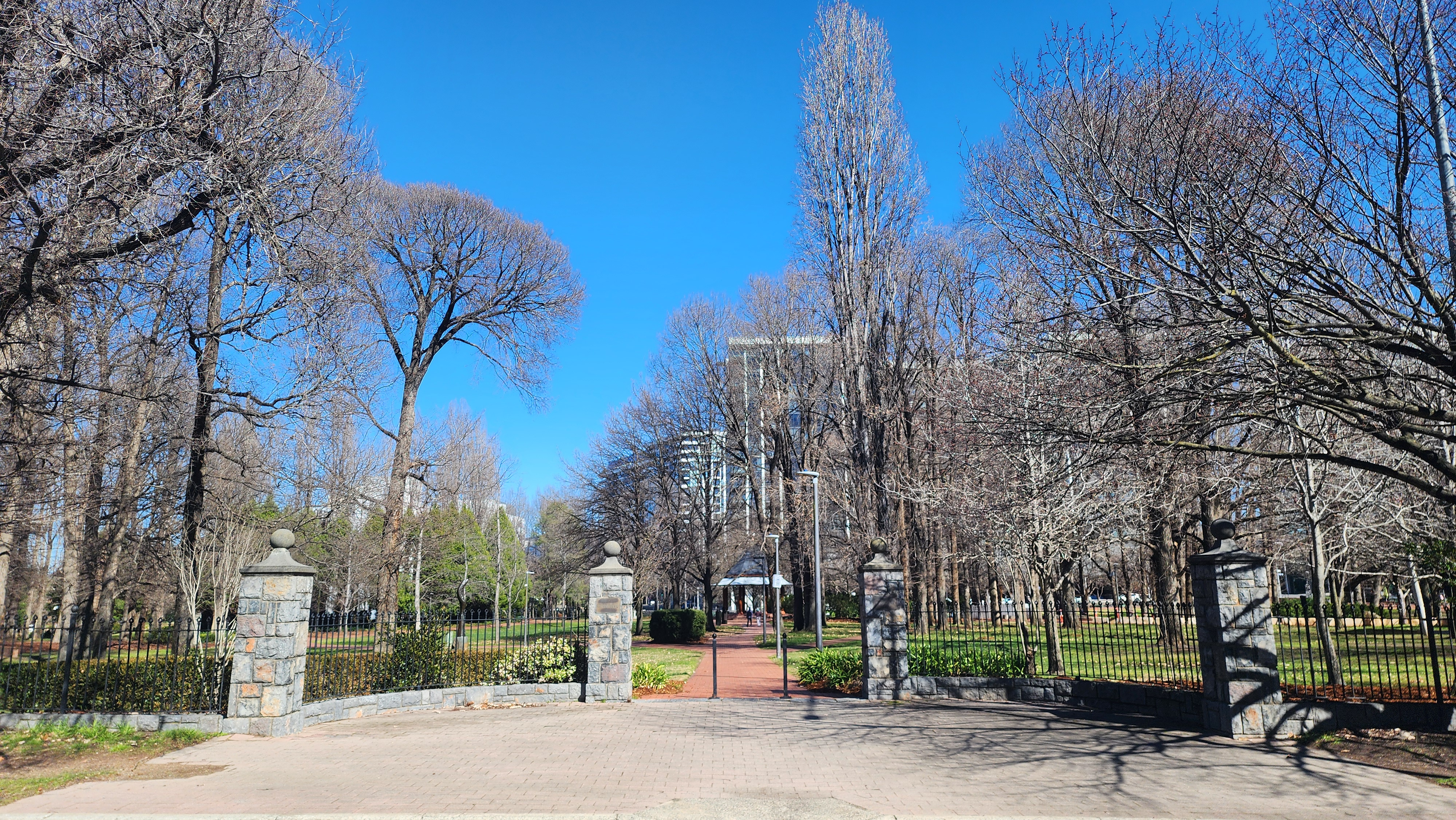
Landscaping changes in 1989 included a fence and gates

== Bibliography ==
- Body, A.H. (1986). Firm Still You Stand (The Anglican Church of St John The Baptist, Canberra, Its Parish and Parishioners. 1841-1984). St Johns Parish Council. ISBN 0-9591711-2-6.
- Waterhouse, Jill (1978). A light in the Bush (The Canberra Church of England Girls' Grammar School and the capital city of Australia, 1926-1977). Canberra Church of England Girls' Grammar School Old Grammarians' Association. ISBN 0-9599072-1-1.
