= Playfair's Terrace =

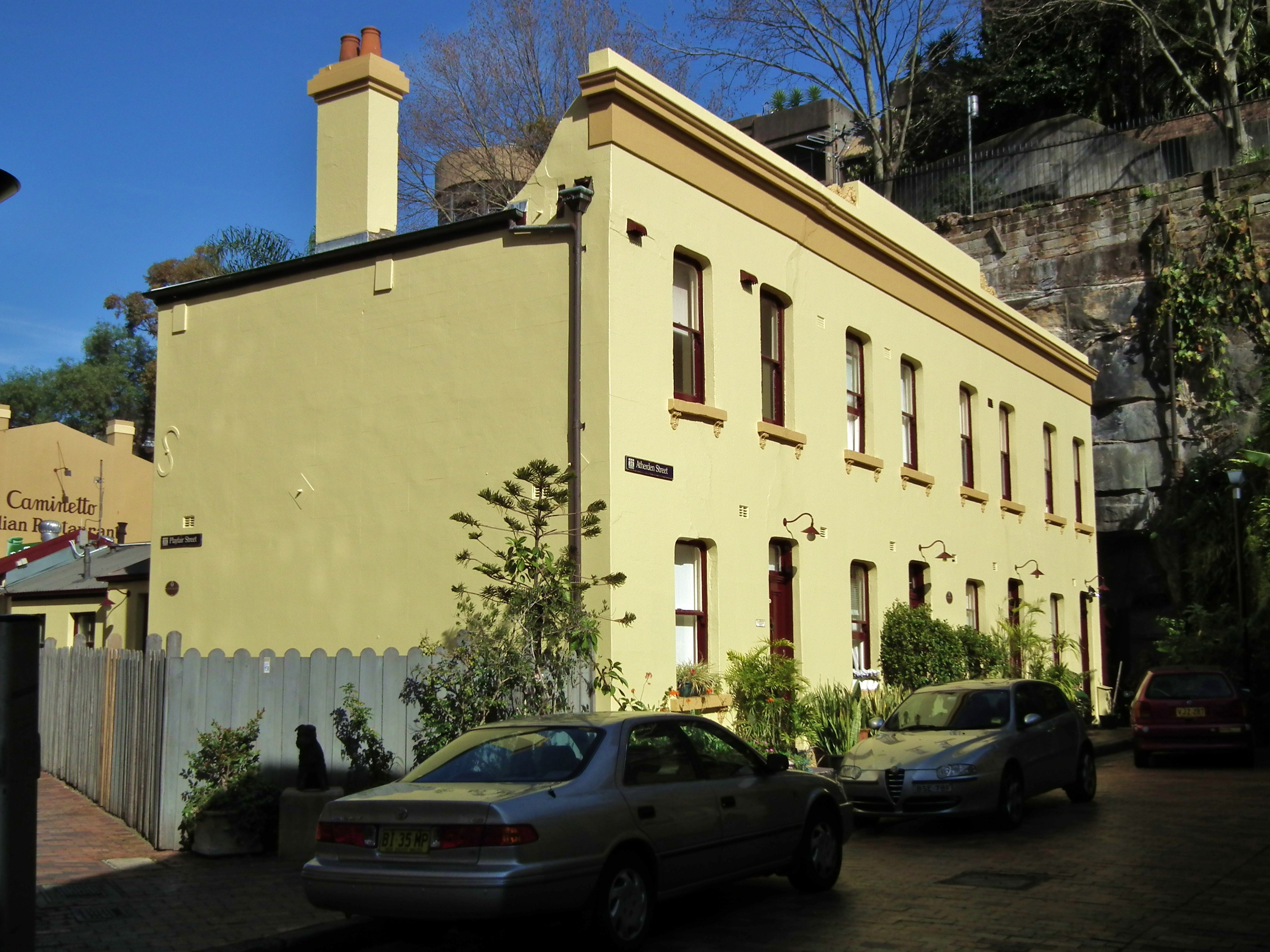
- Playfair's Terrace, located at 1–7 Atherden Street, on the corner of Playfair Street, The Rocks, pictured in 2012.

- Location within Sydney Location within Australia
- 33°51′29″S 151°12′30″E
- Location: 1–7 Atherden Street, The Rocks, City of Sydney, New South Wales, Australia

History
- Built: 1880

Site notes
- Owner: Property NSW

New South Wales Heritage Register
- Official name: Playfair's Terrace; Playfairs
- Type: State heritage (built)
- Designated: 10 May 2002
- Reference no.: 1570
- Type: Terrace
- Category: Residential buildings (private)

Playfair's Terrace are heritage-listed terrace houses located at 1–7 Atherden Street in the inner-city Sydney suburb of The Rocks in the City of Sydney local government area of New South Wales, Australia. It was built in 1880. It is also known as Playfairs. The property is owned by Property NSW, an agency of the Government of New South Wales. It was added to the New South Wales State Heritage Register on 10 May 2002.

== History ==
In 1834, Robert Campbell Snr. was granted this section of land above his water front property. Campbell sold the land to Frederick Wright Unwin in 1841, and in 1847 Unwin reconveyed the property to the Trustees of Campbell's property. In 1848, Joshua Frey Josephson brought the parcel of land containing 25.25 perches and, in 1852, he conveyed the property to 'George Atherden of Campbell's Wharf in Sydney, aforesaid Wharfinger'. On the eastern portion of this parcel of land, George Atherden erected four stone cottages. On the other half of the land, stables were erected, and by 1879 they were demolished. In 1880 G. Atherden trustees, Robert Campbell Close and Charles Campbell conveyed the vacant land, lot 6, to Thomas Playfair of Sydney, a Rocks butcher, for £494.

In 1880, Thomas Playfair erected four terrace houses on lot 6. The dwellings are described as being of two storeys with four rooms and were constructed of brick and cement walls with the roof clad in slate. In 1882 the annual assessed income was 42 pounds. At the beginning of 1882, Playfair's tenants in these dwellings were George Moore, Thomas Dixon, Mr Smith and William R. Scott. By 1889 a further roof was added at the rear of each tenement. In 1896 T. Playfair's terraces were managed by Mr Jessie Walker and Alfred Playfair as trustees and benefactors of T. Playfair's will. In 1902 the roofs were "Corrugated Iron", and in September 1902, Alfred Donald Playfair, Accountant, released the property to the King and Minister for Public Works. In 1921 the adjoining terraces were demolished, and in 1923 Harrington Street was connected to George Street.

== Description ==
A continuous row of four two storey Victorian terraces, each of two bays and built of stuccoed brick with a simple parapet above a projecting cornice. The hipped roof behind is of iron (formerly slate), intersected by the partition parapets. There is no visible division between the houses on the façade, which has rectangular openings with top corners rounded and simple corbelled sills. Windows to the front are four panes, while those at the rear are twelve.

=== Condition ===
As of 17 January 2000, the building condition is generally fair. Archaeology Assessment Condition: Partly disturbed. Assessment Basis: Floors level with street. Sandstone quarried up to Gloucester Street frontage.

== Heritage listing ==
As of 30 March 2011, Playfair's Terrace and site are of State heritage significance for their historical and scientific cultural values. The site and building are also of State heritage significance for their contribution to The Rocks area, which is of State Heritage significance in its own right.

Nos 1–7 Atherden Street, together with Avery Terrace at Nos 2–4 Atherden Street, are well-scaled buildings and good examples of their size and type. The terraces, and the escarpment at the end of Atherden Street, provide a fine intimate street space and sense of enclosure. The buildings and the enclosed street space make an important contribution to the heritage significance of The Rocks Conservation Area.

Playfair's Terrace was listed on the New South Wales State Heritage Register on 10 May 2002 having satisfied the following criteria.

The place is important in demonstrating the course, or pattern, of cultural or natural history in New South Wales.

Playfair's Terrace and site are of State heritage significance for their historical and scientific cultural values. The site and building are also of State heritage significance for their contribution to The Rocks area, which is of State Heritage significance in its own right.

The place is important in demonstrating aesthetic characteristics and/or a high degree of creative or technical achievement in New South Wales.

Nos 1–7 Atherden Street, together with Avery Terrace at Nos 2-4 Atherden Street, are well-scaled buildings and good examples of their size and type. The terraces, and the escarpment at the end of Atherden Street, provide a fine intimate street space and sense of enclosure. The buildings and the enclosed street space make an important contribution to the heritage significance of The Rocks Conservation Area.
