= Glebe Park =

Glebe Park may refer to:

- Glebe Park, Brechin, a football stadium in Brechin, Scotland
- Glebe Park, Canberra, a public park in Canberra, Australia

== See also ==
- Glebe, area of land within a manor and parish
