= Peter Collinson =

Peter Collinson may refer to:

- Peter Collinson (botanist) (1694–1768), English scientist and horticulturalist
- Peter Collinson (film director) (1936–1980), film director
- Dashiell Hammett (1894–1961), American author of detective fiction; sometimes used the pseudonym Peter Collinson
