= Edward Charles Close =

Australian politician

Personal details
- Born: 12 March 1790 Rangamati, Bengal
- Died: 7 May 1866 (aged 76) Morpeth, New South Wales, Australia
- Resting place: Anglican Church of St James, Morpeth
- Party: None
- Profession: soldier, civil engineer, local government official, magistrate
- Awards: Peninsular medal

Military service
- Branch/service: (United Kingdom) British Army
- Years of service: 1808-1822
- Rank: Lieutenant
- Unit: 48th Regiment
- Battles/wars: Peninsular War

Edward Charles Close (Senior) (12 March 1790 – 7 May 1866) was a British soldier, engineer, New South Wales colonial magistrate, member of the New South Wales Legislative Council, and early European settler in Morpeth. He was born at Rangamati, British India (in what is now Bangladesh) and was the only child of merchant Edward and Marianne Collinson, daughter of Michael Collinson. He accompanied his mother to England when she went there following his father's death. They settled with Marianne's brother Charles Streynsham Collinson on his estate at the Chantry, Ipswich.

Enlisted in the army in 1808, he served in the Peninsular War as lieutenant in the 48th Regiment.

He arrived in New South Wales on the 3rd of August 1817 on the Matilda. Close was transferred to Newcastle where he was acting engineer from 1821 to 1822.

On 27 September 1821 at St John's Church, Parramatta he married Sophia Susannah Palmer, daughter of John Palmer. In 1822 he resigned from the army to settle in a 2,560 acre property in Morpeth.

In 1829 he was appointed to the Legislative Council, however he found membership of the council to be a burden, both in expense and time and he resigned with effect from 1838.

Close's son, Edward Charles Close junior, was a member of the New South Wales Legislative Assembly. His only daughter Marrianne Collinson married George Campbell of Duntroon.
