= Experiments and Observations on Electricity =

Book by Benjamin Franklin

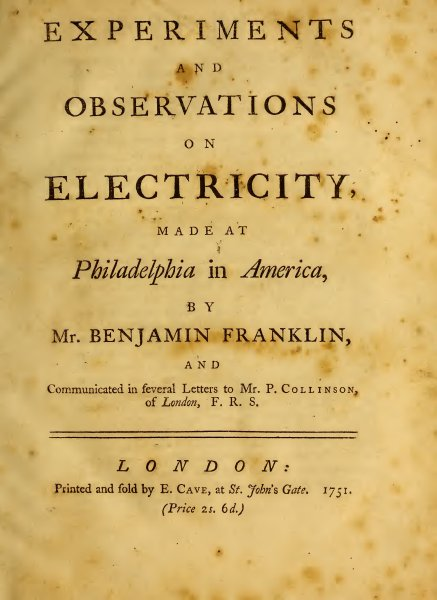
- Title page of 1751 original publication
- Author: Benjamin Franklin
- Language: English
- Subject: Electricity
- Genre: Scientific treatise
- Publisher: E. Cave
- Publication date: 1751
- Publication place: England
- Media type: Print
- Followed by: Expanded editions (1753, 1754, 1769, 1774)

Experiments and Observations on Electricity is a treatise by Benjamin Franklin based on letters that he wrote to Peter Collinson, who communicated Franklin's ideas to the Royal Society. The letters were published as a book in England in 1751, and over the following years the book was reissued in four more editions containing additional material, the last in 1774. Science historian I. Bernard Cohen crafted an edition with historical commentary that was published in 1941.
