= Sophia Campbell =

Early Australian settler (1777–1833)

Sophia Palmer
- Born: 14 December 1777; Portsmouth, England
- Died: 5 May 1833 (aged 55); Sydney, New South Wales, Australia
- Other name: Sophia
- Spouse: Robert Campbell (m. 1801)
- Children: John Campbell (1802–1886); Robert Campbell (1804–1859); Sophia Ives Campbell (1812–1891); Charles Campbell (1810–1888); Sarah Jeffreys nee Campbell (1815–?); George P. Campbell (1818–1881); Frederick Marsden Campbell (1821–1885)
- Parent(s): John Palmer (1727–1808); Sarah Taylor (Abt 1735–1796)

Sophia Campbell (née Palmer; 14 december 1777 – 5 May 1833) was an early Australian settler. She was the wife of politician Robert Campbell.

== Life ==
One of eight children, Sophia Palmer was born in Portsmouth and educated in London. She came to Sydney with her naval officer brother John Palmer (1760–1833) and his family, a second unmarried naval officer brother Christopher Palmer (1767–1821), and her unmarried sister Sarah Sophia Palmer (1774–?) on board the Porpoise in November 1800. Her brother John Palmer was bringing his family to settle permanently in New South Wales, and had previously come to Sydney in 1788 as Purser on the Sirius, the flagship of the First Fleet. He had also been Commissary General of New South Wales from 1791 to 1811, remaining employed in the Commissariat until he retired in 1819; and he was a magistrate from 1793.

Campbell first settled on John Palmer's 100 acres (40 ha) 1793 grant which he named Woolloomooloo Farm. In November 1801, Campbell married the merchant Robert Campbell (1769-1846), a Scottish Presbyterian eight years her senior, in St Philip's Church, Sydney. They had seven children.

Campbell moved to Wharf House, her husband’s home behind his wharves on the west side of Circular Quay. Apart from two trips to England, in 1805–06 and 1810–1815, and shorter journeys to various parts of New South Wales, she lived in Sydney until her death.

Campbell died in 1833 and was buried in St John’s Cemetery, Parramatta.

Until 2009, Campbell was identified by Professor Joan Kerr, Clifford Burmester and others as an artist who produced two sketchbooks, one held at the National Library of Australia and one held at the State Library of New South Wales. These sketchbooks were re-attributed in May 2009 to Edward Charles Close. This re-attribution removed any evidence that Campbell was an artist.
