= St John the Baptist Church, Reid =

St John's Anglican Church
- St John the Baptist Anglican Church, Reid
- St John's, Reid
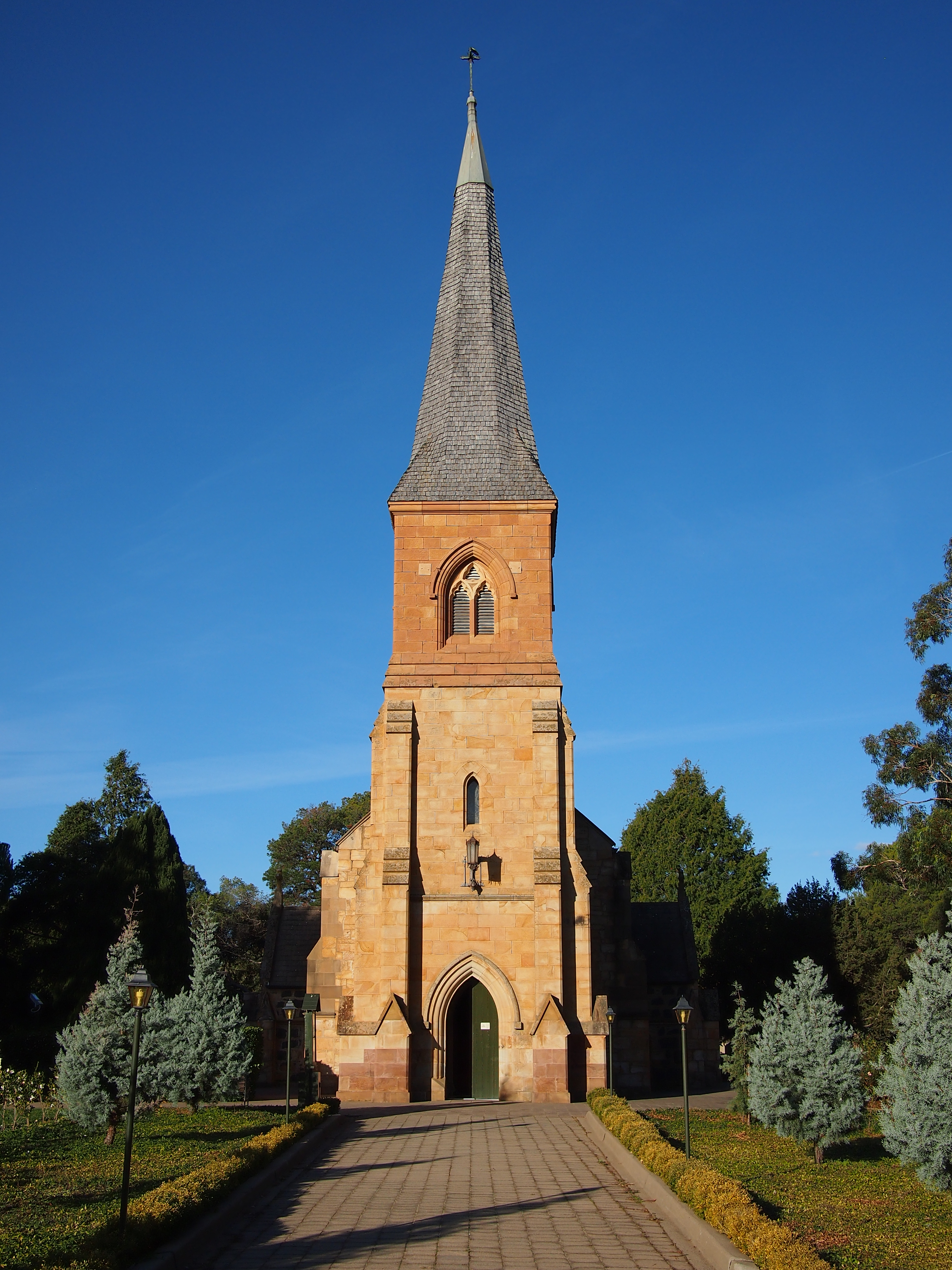
- Exterior from West, 2014
- St John's Anglican Church
- Location: Corner of Anzac Parade and Constitution Avenue, Reid, Australian Capital Territory
- Country: Australia
- Denomination: Anglican
- Website: stjohnscanberra.org

History
- Former name(s): St John the Baptist Church of England, Reid
- Dedication: Saint John the Baptist
- Consecrated: 12 March 1845 by William Broughton

Architecture
- Heritage designation: ACT Heritage Register
- Architects: Robert Campbell (1841–45; church); George Campbell (nave extension); Edmund Blacket (1865–1870; replacement tower); John Campbell (1872–73; chancel)
- Style: Victorian Free Medieval; Victorian Gothic Revival
- Years built: 1841–1873

Specifications
- Materials: Bluestone; Sandstone

Administration
- Diocese: Canberra and Goulburn
- Parish: Canberra

Clergy
- Bishop: Mark Short
- Rector: Rev David McLennan
- Priest: Rev Andrew Cameron (Public Theology)

St John the Baptist Church is an Australian Anglican church in the Canberra suburb of Reid in the Australian Capital Territory. It is the oldest surviving public building within Canberra's inner city and the oldest church in the Australian Capital Territory, dating back to 1845, and contains several medieval stones, including a 12th-century stone from Canterbury Cathedral and a 13th-century stone from Westminster Abbey. The church is located at the corner of Anzac Parade and Constitution Avenue, adjacent to the Parliamentary Triangle.

St John's has been variously described as a "spiritual and social centre", a "sanctuary in the city" and "the Westminster Abbey of Australia". Overlooking Lake Burley Griffin today, it has remained a small English village-style church even as Australia's capital grew around it. Over time, it became a focal point for Australia's governors-general, politicians, public servants and military leaders, and has hosted royalty on numerous occasions.

The church remains an active place of worship and a Canberra landmark, although it has now been surrounded by offices and residential buildings. The bells of St John's, cast from the same foundry as the National Carillon, are audible from Lake Burley Griffin. St John's Care, a local charity, emergency relief and community organisation affiliated with Anglicare, is based in the church precinct, as is the parish's musical group, the St John's Choir. An annual community fair has been held in the church grounds since the 1930s, with participation from local schools, bands and arts organisations. In March 2020, the church celebrated its 175th anniversary since consecration.

== Construction ==
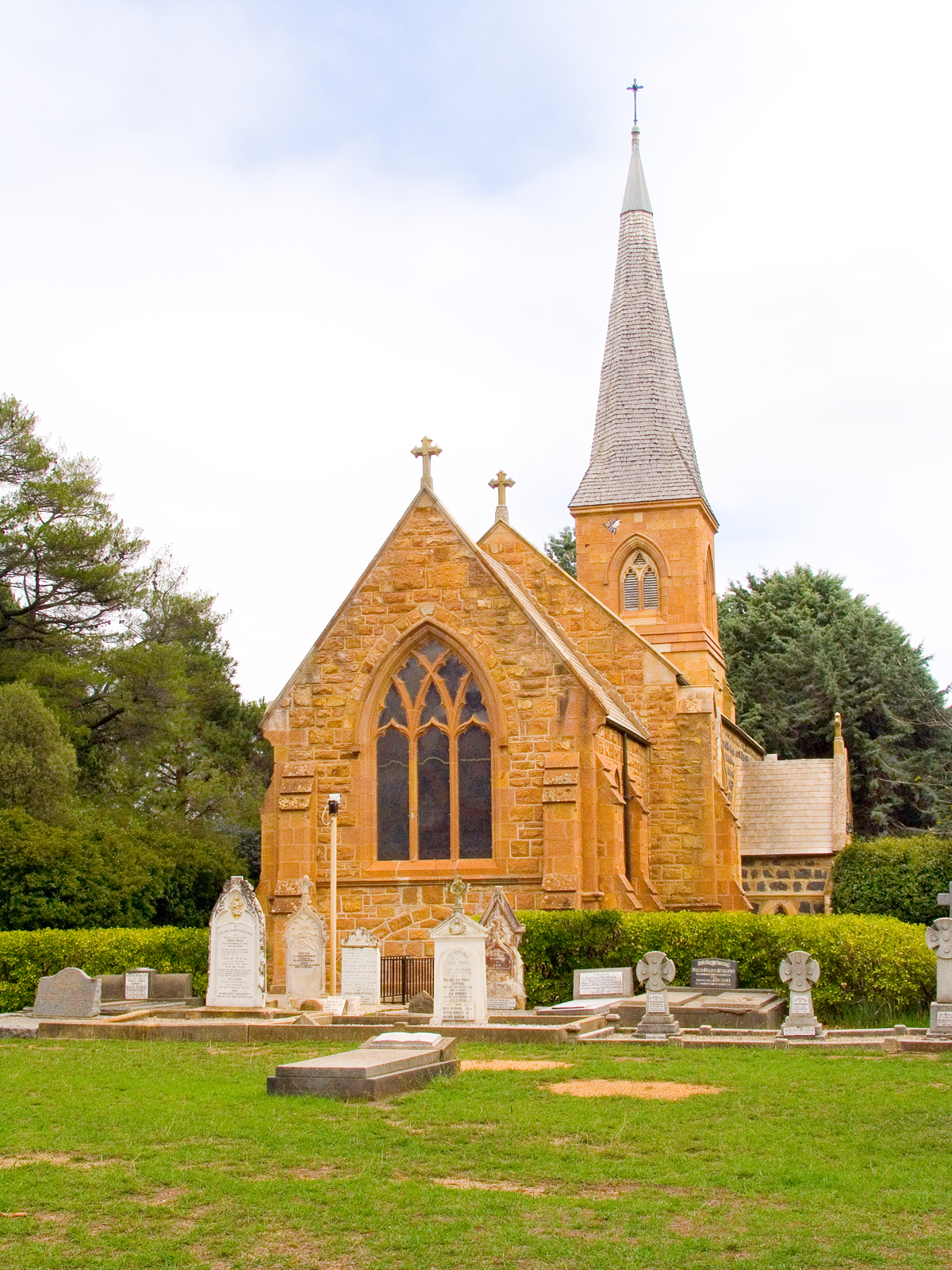
East facade with the east window

St John's is oriented east–west, with the nave to the east and the main entrance (with choir loft and organ above) to the west. The site was chosen by Robert Campbell in 1840, with the support of William Grant Broughton, the first Bishop of Australia. Campbell was a generous supporter of the then Church of England in Australia, despite being Presbyterian. He also wanted a place for the local community to congregate and was willing to donate his own land to this cause. Bishop Broughton's ambition went further: he sought to establish the Church of England as "the national church, established in law, charged with the care of all subjects of the Crown, apostolic in its doctrine and government". St John's was a product of these efforts. The foundation stone was laid in on 11 May 1841 by the Revd Edward Smith, Rector of Queanbeyan, and the church was consecrated on 12 March 1845 by Bishop Broughton.

The building was constructed over a period of several years and was completed in three stages in the Victorian Free Medieval and Victorian Gothic Revival styles:

- The original church erected by Robert Campbell (1841–45)
- Nave extension by George Campbell
- Chancel by John Campbell (1872–73)

The church's sandstone walls were quarried from the base of Black Mountain and Quarry Hill (located in the suburb of Yarralumla).

The original 6-metre (20 ft) church tower was erected in 1845 but developed a one-metre (two-foot) lean, was deemed unsafe and was dismantled in 1864. The present tower was designed by Edmund Blacket and erected during the period 1865–1870. Sandstone for the tower's window mouldings was hauled by bullock from the Camden-Bargo district, a distance of 161 kilometres (100 mi). The spire was completed in 1877, making the church on a hill a prominent countryside landmark. The tall trees, many planted by long-serving Rector of Canberra Revd Pierce Galliard Smith, formed another landmark.

The church and associated schoolhouse museum were added to the (now defunct) Australian Register of the National Estate on 21 October 1980. The church, churchyard and Schoolhouse Museum are now listed by the ACT Heritage Council, which notes, in particular, that the east and west lychgates at St John's are a rare example of this type of structure in Australia.

== Interior ==
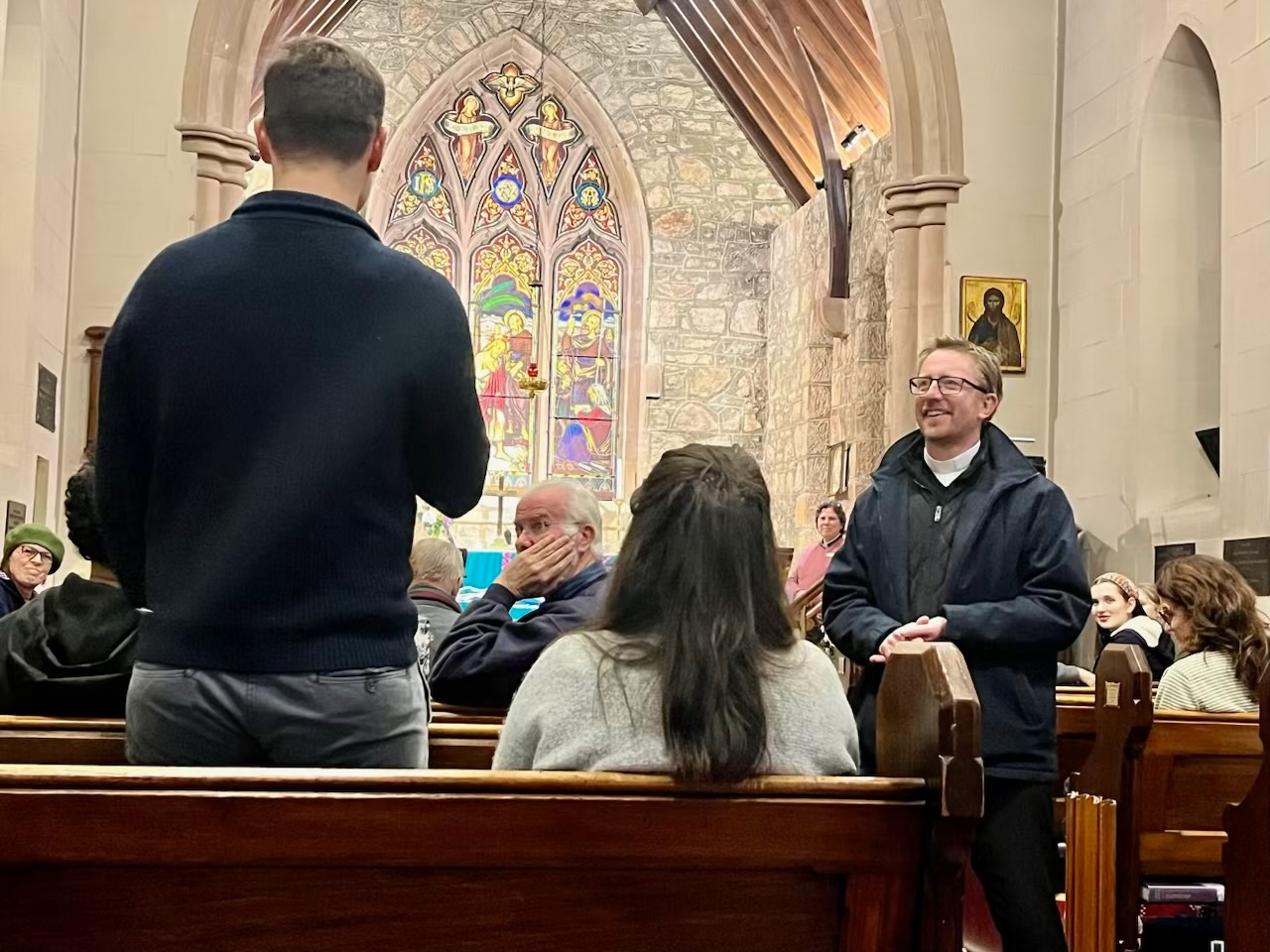
Nave of St John the Baptist Anglican church with Rev. David MacLennan.

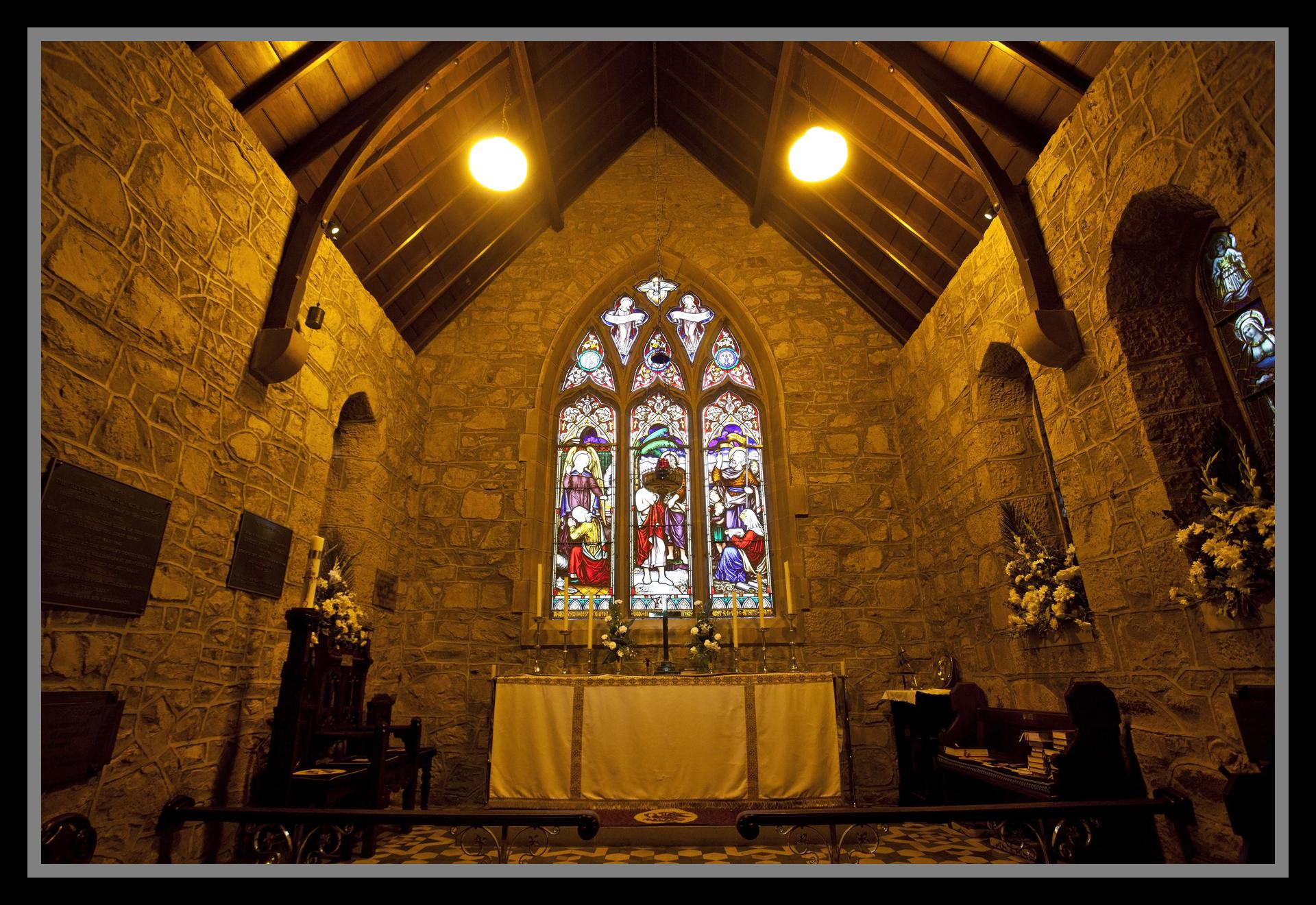
Chancel and east window depicting scenes related to Saint John the Baptist

The entrance walls contain three medieval stones of significance, marked by plaques. The oldest is a 12th-century stone from Canterbury Cathedral, which was originally intended to be the foundation stone of the National Anglican Cathedral of St Mark. As the national cathedral never eventuated, St John's came to be viewed by some as the de facto "Westminster Abbey of Australia"; and to mark the first visit of the Queen of Australia in 1954, a stone from Westminster Abbey dating back to the 13th century was gifted and installed. The third medieval stone is dated 1215 and was part of an exchange of stones with the Church of St John the Baptist in Brinklow in the United Kingdom in 1948 (a stone from St John’s rests in the Brinklow Church).

Memorial plaques to parishioners cover the interior of the nave, from earlier pastoral families to eminent Australians after Australia's federation. Prominent memorials include those for Sir Robert Garran, Sir Littleton Groom, H. V. Evatt, Sir William McKell, Major General Sir William Bridges and General Sir Brudenell White. Extensive use of stained glass is evident in the chancel, the nave and within the tower. The chancel's east window was added between 1872 and 1874, and depicts biblical scenes related to Saint John the Baptist, after whom the church is dedicated. The east window was designed by William Macleod and made by the Sydney firm of John Falconer. It is one of the earliest Australian stained glass windows and was a prize-winning window at the Sydney Exhibition in 1873 before its installation at the church.

The Royal Military College and St John's have long been associated with each other. Both are situated on land originally owned by Campbell. The historical ties between the church and the college are recognised by the military colours (flags) which are "laid up" beneath the organ gallery: one of the Werriwa Regiment and the other of the Royal Military College.

In the side chapel on the north edge is a small bamboo cross with the words "Reconciliation and Repentance". The cross was presented to the church by the presiding bishop of the Anglican Church in Japan, Bishop Michael Yashiro, on 9 June 1950 in the years following the Second World War. It serves as a memorial to Sister May Hayman, a staff member at the Canberra Hospital and a parishioner at St John's. Sister Hayman was killed by Japanese soldiers in New Guinea whilst serving as a missionary and nurse during the war. In September 2014, the Bishop of Kobe (Andrew Yatuka Nakamura) attended a service at St John's in memory of Sister Hayman and to celebrate the modern Australia-Japan relationship.

== Music ==
St John's has had several organs installed throughout its history. The present pipe organ, built by Ronald Sharp and installed in 1981, is the builder's last major instrument. It is a 2-manual tracker action instrument located in the west gallery, with a case made of Western Australian jarrah and tin facade pipes. Sharp built many other significant Australian pipe organs including the Sydney Opera House Concert Hall organ and organs at St Mary's Cathedral, Sydney, the Canberra School of Music, the Perth Concert Hall and Knox Grammar School. In the mid-1970s, the work was undertaken to extend and strengthen the gallery in order to accommodate the new organ.

St John's first organ was an English-built, single manual tracker, installed around 1862. It is now located at St Luke's Anglican Church, Deakin. A second instrument was built in 1933 by Hill, Norman & Beard had five extended ranks with electro-pneumatic action. It was sold in 1979 to a private owner.

St John's Choir is a four-part volunteer choir which sings at the traditional Book of Common Prayer services of Mattins and Evensong. The choir is usually accompanied by the organ at Sunday services. At special occasions such as weddings and church festivals, accompanying instruments can include the flute, trumpet and keyboard.

== Bells ==
The chime of eight church bells were donated by Governor-General William Sidney, 1st Viscount De L'Isle and mark his term of office (1961–65). They were presented as a memorial to his wife Jacqueline. The bells were cast by John Taylor & Co—the same foundry at which the bells of the National Carillon were cast—and were installed in 1964. They range "in weight from 2 to 13 hundredweight and in diameter from 3 feet 4.5 inches to 1 foot 9 inches". The bells are rung in the English change ringing tradition, but rather than swinging full circle, are chimed using an Ellacombe apparatus. Instead, the ringers pull ropes attached to the bell clappers, which strike the inside of the bells, with two ringers ringing four bells each. The bells are rung at selected Sunday services, for weddings and funerals, and for special occasions. When required, hymns and other melodies can also be rung.

== Church precinct ==
=== Churchyard ===
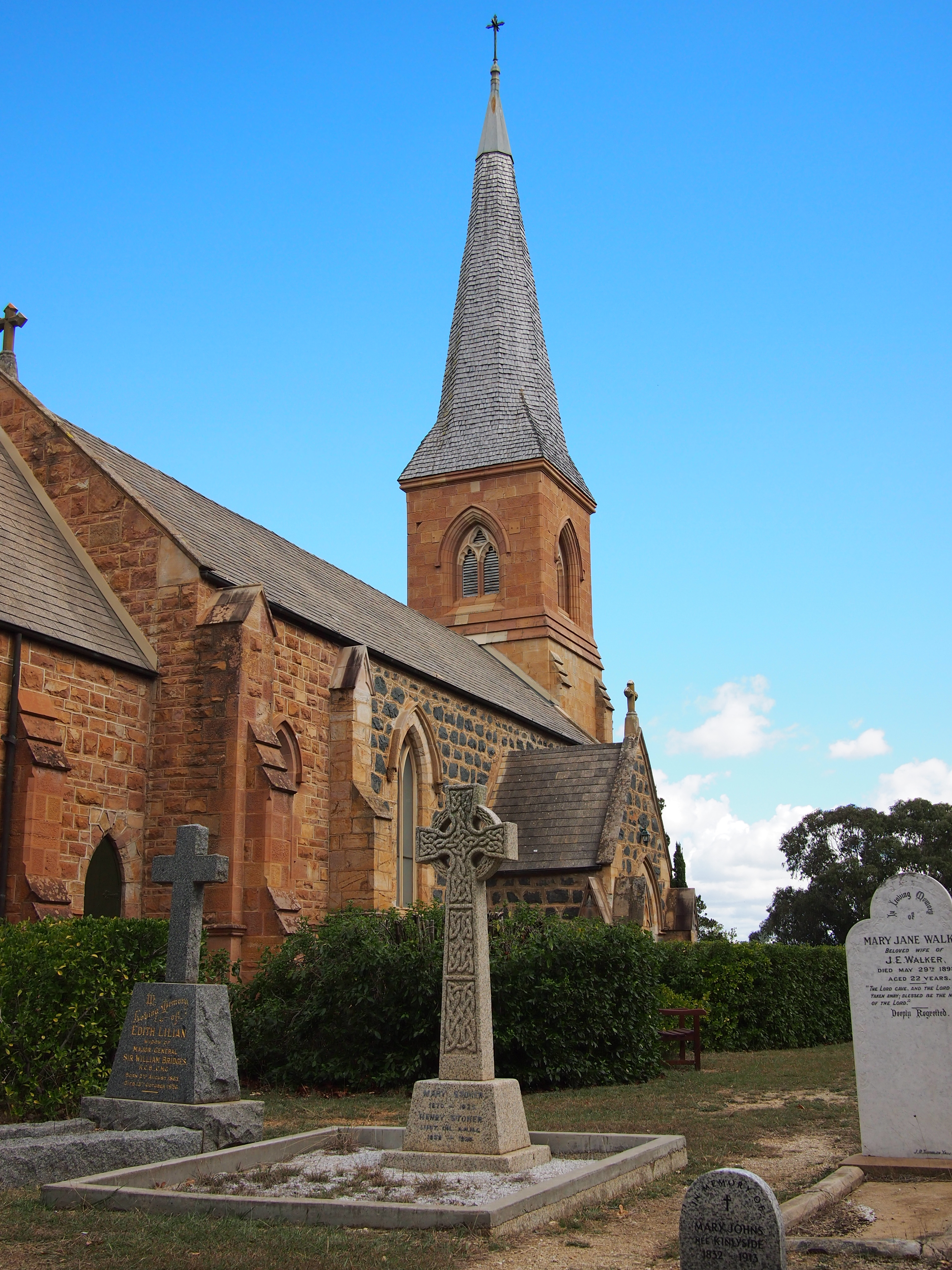
Grave (left) of the widow of Major General Sir William Bridges, the first Australian Chief of the General Staff

St John's churchyard contains Canberra's original cemetery, which is the oldest single denomination graveyard still in use in the ACT. The first burial in the churchyard was on 3 May 1844.

The mortal remains of many pioneers of the Canberra district are interred at St John's. They include the church's long-serving 19th-century rector, the Revd Pierce Galliard Smith, and Colonel John George Nathaniel Gibbes, who occupied Yarralumla homestead from 1859 until his death 14 years later. Gibbes was reputed to be the illegitimate son of a royal duke. Coincidentally, lying close to Gibbes' grave is the final resting place of another person with a link to the British throne, albeit one greatly separated in time and circumstance from that of the colonel. That person is Viscount Dunrossil, a former Governor-General of Australia, who died in office in 1961.

Also interred in the churchyard are the remains of Colonel Gibbes' wife, Elizabeth, his son Augustus Gibbes (Yarralumla's proprietor from 1859 to 1881), his grandson Henry Edmund Gibbes, and his great-grandson, the Australian air ace Bobby Gibbes DSO, DFC and bar—as well as St Christopher Battye and members of the pioneering McDonald, Guise, Shumack and Campbell families. The McDonalds are of Cranachan, Inverness Shire, Scotland, the same lineage as Flora Hannah McKillop (McDonald), mother of the Australian saint Mary MacKillop. This information is drawn inter alia from the definitive guide to all known burials at the site, Jean Salisbury's St John's Churchyard Canberra.

On 12 November 1845, a local Canberran, Sarah Webb of Tidbinbilla, was buried in the churchyard after dying in childbirth. The epitaph on her headstone reads, "For here we have no continuing city but seek one to come", a reference to St Paul's letter to the Hebrews (Hebrews 13:14). Webb's headstone became known as the "Prophet’s Tombstone" and became a magnet for travellers when Canberra was announced as Australia's future capital city.

The churchyard was closed to new burials in 1937 unless exclusive rights to a plot were held.

=== Schoolhouse museum ===
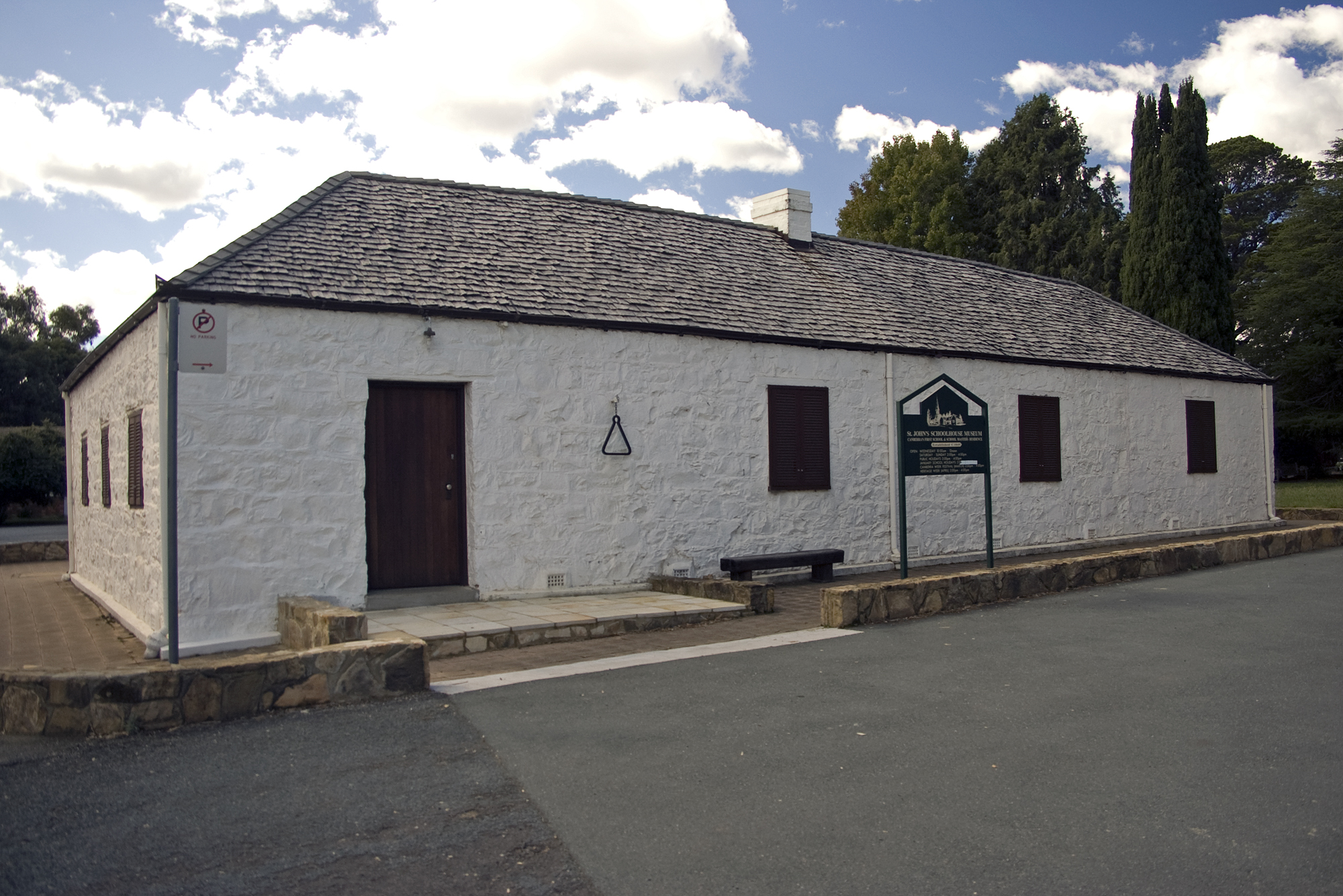
St John's Schoolhouse Museum

Canberra's first school opened in 1845, the same year that St John's was consecrated. It was sponsored by the Campbells. The schoolroom was surrounded by five other rooms and served as the schoolmaster's residence. The schoolhouse's rubble and bluestone were quarried locally, with a shingle roof and thick walls to shelter against the harsh Canberra climate. The first students arrived in 1845 and it was the only school on the Limestone Plains until 1880 when the first public school was opened. It was built to educate local settlers children, including the Blundell children who lived in nearby Blundell's Cottage, another surviving remnant of Canberra's past.

The schoolhouse closed in 1907 and reopened in 1969 as a museum containing records and artifacts from Canberra's rural and recent past. These include schoolhouse artifacts, photographs, letters, newspaper cuttings and other heritage items, serving as tangible evidence of the lives of early European settlers in the region.

=== Rectory ===
The rectory, the residence of the rector of Canberra, lies in the southeastern corner of the church precinct, opening onto Anzac Parade. It was completed in 1923. The original rectory of St John's was built in 1873 in what is now Glebe Park in inner Canberra. The first occupant was the Revd Pierre Galliard Smith, who surrounded the rectory with poplars, elms, willows and hawthorns. The survivors and descendants of those trees remain in today's Glebe Park. From 1926 to early 1928 the old rectory was leased from the government by an Anglican religious order, the Community of the Sisters of the Church, or the Kilburn Sisters, to found St Gabriel's school which later became the Canberra Girls' Grammar School.

== 21st century ==
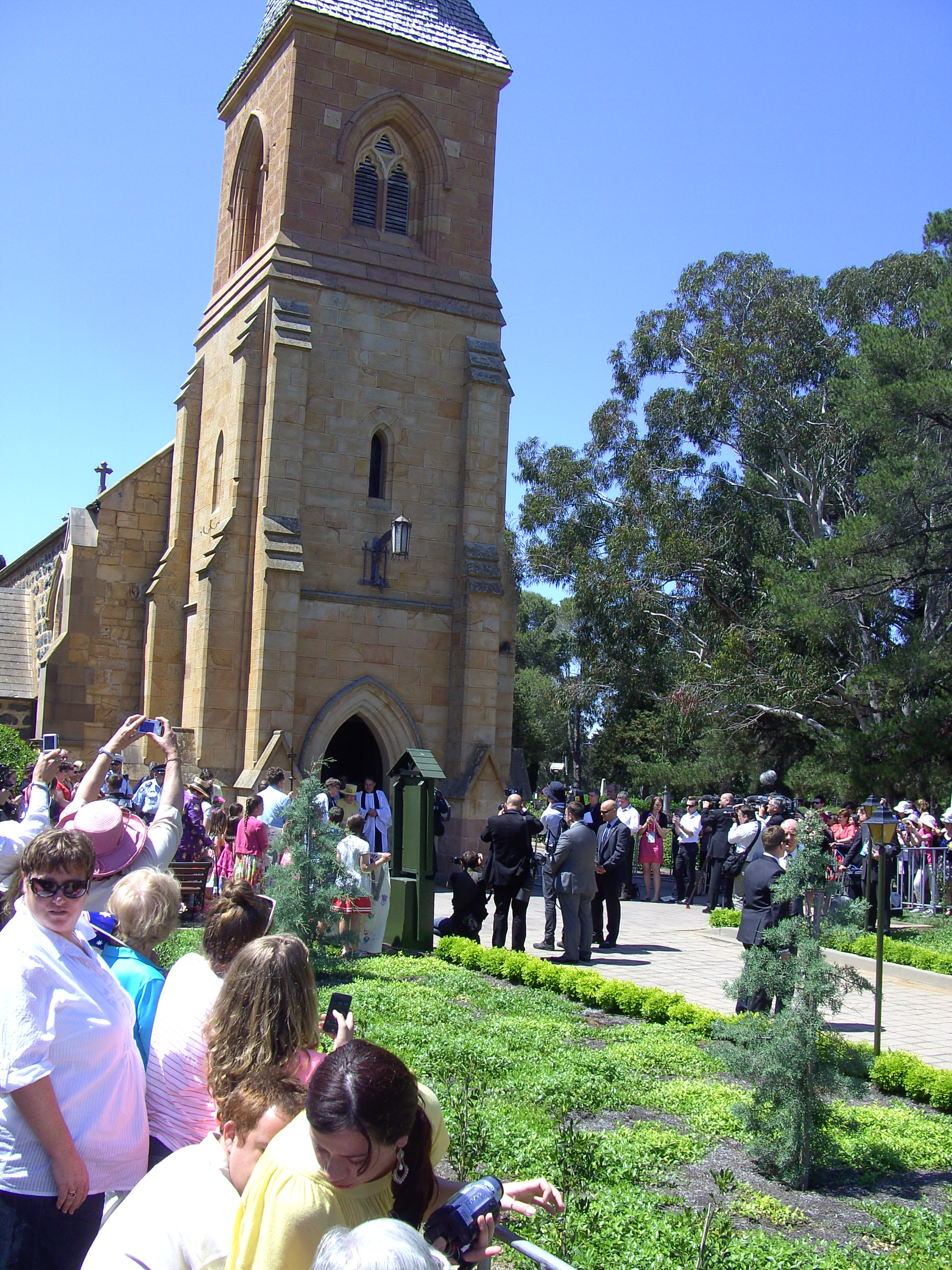
Queen Elizabeth II emerges from St John's after a service on 23 October 2011

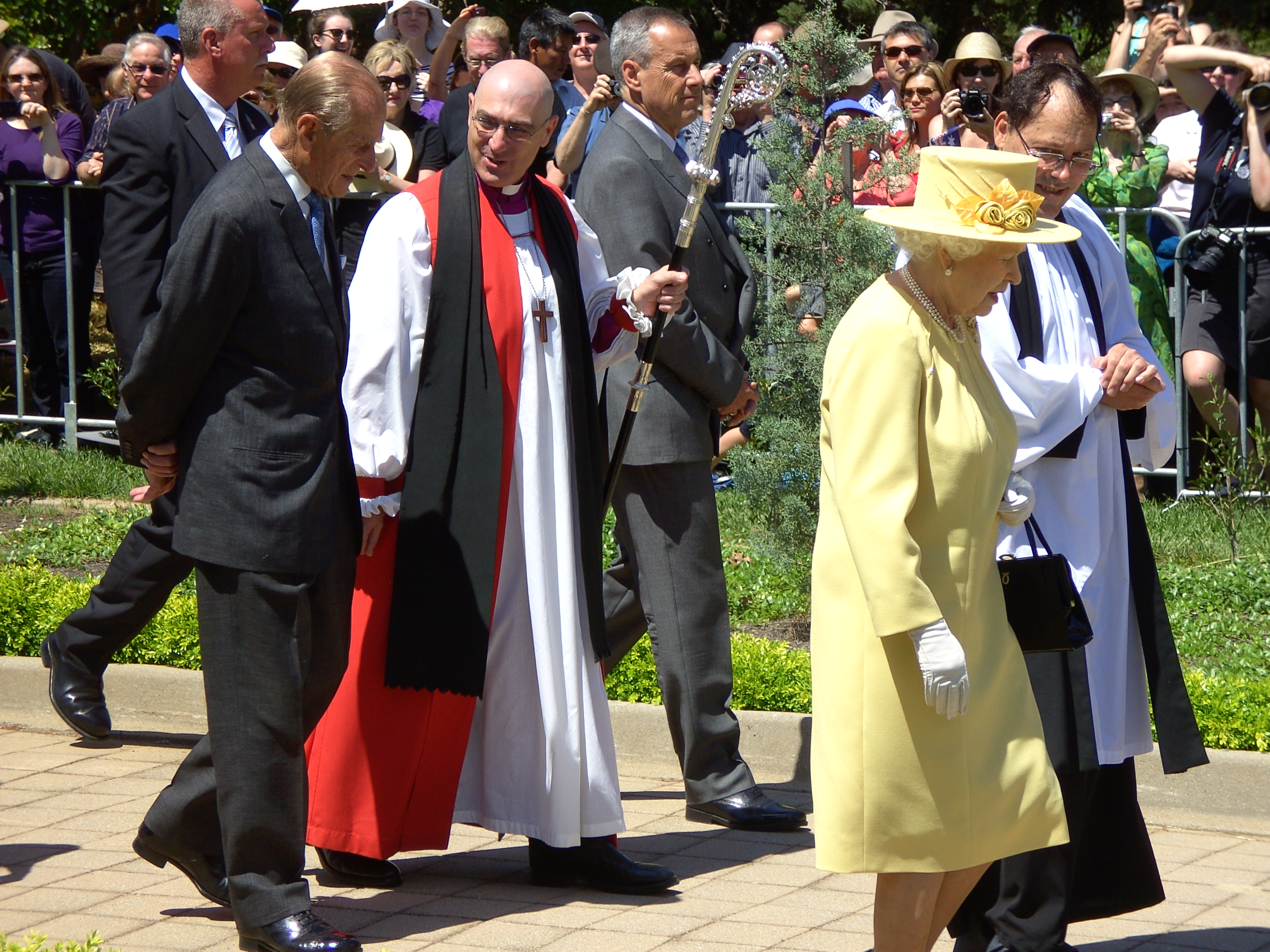
Queen Elizabeth II talking with the rector, the Revd Paul Black, and Prince Philip with the Bishop of Canberra and Goulburn the Rt Revd Stuart Robinson

A former Prime Minister of Australia, Kevin Rudd, and his wife, Thérèse Rein, regularly attended the church from 2009 to 2010. Rudd and Rein had been married at St John's and their eldest son had been baptised there. Rudd took the opportunity to address the assembled media and television cameras after Sunday services and field and answer questions on topics of the day.

During the visit of the Queen of Australia in October 2011, Queen Elizabeth II and Prince Philip attended St John's for the 11:15 am service on 23 October 2011. She was welcomed by the rector, the Revd Canon Paul Black, and the Bishop of Canberra and Goulburn, the Rt Revd Stuart Robinson. Kevin Rudd and Thérèse Rein were among the 120 guests at the service. The visit was Queen Elizabeth II's sixth to St John's; her first was in 1954.

On 29 September 2018, a service was held at St John's to celebrate the 70th anniversary of the first Ukrainian Orthodox service in Australia. That service was held at St John's on 26 September 1948. St John's continued to accommodate Orthodox services until a Ukrainian Orthodox church was built in 1959. Bishop Daniel Zelinsky of South Bound Brook, New Jersey, celebrated the Divine Liturgy and preached in Ukrainian and English.

On 15 March 2020, St John's celebrated its 175th anniversary since its 1845 consecration. A special 10:00 am choral service was held, attended by the Governor General, David Hurley, and the Ambassador of the United States, Arthur Culvahouse. The sermon was preached by the Bishop of Canberra and Goulburn, the Rt Revd Mark Short. St John's was described as "an English village church and through a quirk of history they literally put the national capital around us". The service was the last to be held before the church closed temporarily as a result of the 2020 worldwide coronavirus pandemic, with services being recorded and distributed online.

== Incumbents ==
The first incumbent, Edward Smith, was rector of the Queanbeayan parish (which preceded St John's). The longest serving incumbent was Pierce Galliard Smith, from 1855 to 1905.

Other notable incumbents include:

- Robert Davies (1949–1953)
- Robert Gordon Arthur (1953–1960)
- Owen Dowling (1972–1981)
- Ian George (1981–1989)
- Allan Ewing (1996–2003)
- Gregory Thompson (2004–2007)

== See also ==
- St Paul's Church, Manuka
- List of churches in Canberra
- List of Canberra landmarks
