= Charles Streynsham Collinson =

English official

- Born: 1753
- Died: 1831
- Occupation(s): resident minister, High Sheriff of Suffolk
- Relatives: Peter Collinson (grandfather); Edward Charles Close (nephew)

Charles Streynsham Collinson (1753–1831) was an English official of the East India Company who served as the resident minister of Beauleah, in British India.

He later returned to England settling in Sproughton near Ipswich. He was High Sheriff of Suffolk from 11 February 1801 to 2 February 1802.

== Family life ==
Charles Streynsham Collinson, born in 1753, was the son of Michael Collinson, a noted botanist like his father Peter Collinson. His sister Marianne Collinson was also in India and married Edward Close, a merchant. their son Edward Charles Close was born in Rangamati, British India in March 1790.
