= Pierce Galliard Smith =

Pierce Galliard Smith (27 October 1826 – 18 November 1908) was a Scottish cleric of the Church of England, and the rector at St John the Baptist Church, Reid in Canberra, Australia. He was well known for planting trees all over his 2330 square kilometre parish.

Born in Lochvale near Langholm, Smith was the son of Eaglesfield Smith and his wife Judith Ann Irving, daughter of Sir Paulus Aemilius Irving. He was educated at University College, Durham, receiving an M.A. in 1852. He held a post as curate and chaplain in Northumberland before he arrived in New South Wales with his family in 1855.

Smith moved to Canberra and lived at a cottage at Acton until 1873 when he and his family moved into the new Glebe House (which was demolished in the mid 20th century). Many of Canberra's trees were propagated from the trees that he planted around Glebe House. In 1889 he was thrown from his horse and broke a leg. He was unable to ride again and had to visit his parish in a carriage. In 1905 he retired to Queanbeyan where he died in 1908. He is buried at St John's.

Smith's second daughter, Mary, married George De Salis of Cuppacumbalong Homestead in 1878.
