= Reid, Australian Capital Territory =

Suburb of Canberra, Australia

Reid
- Suburb
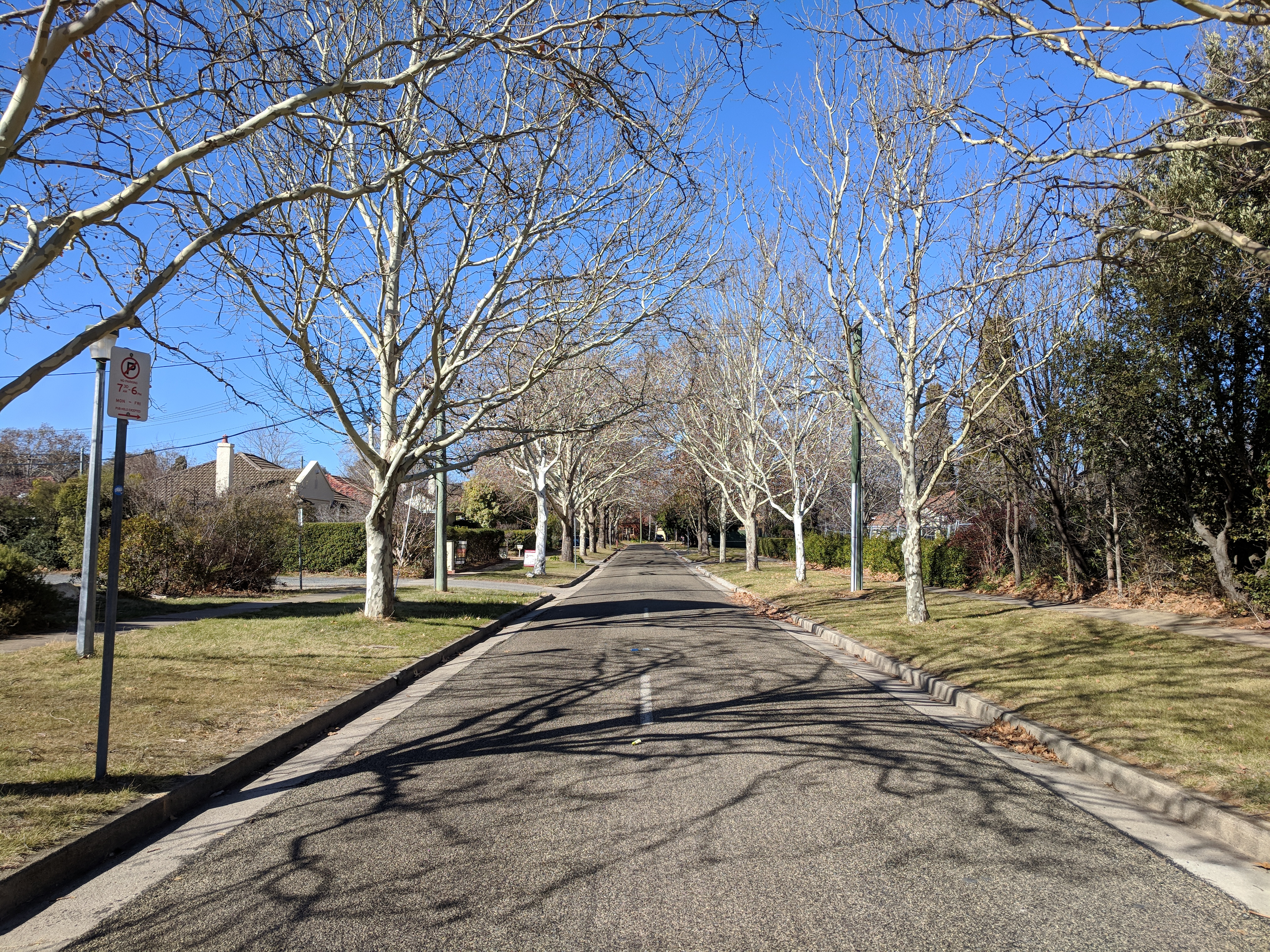
- Dirrawan Gardens in July 2018

- Coordinates: 35°17′0″S 149°08′30″E
- Country: Australia
- State: Australian Capital Territory
- City: Canberra
- District: North Canberra
- Location: 2 km (1.2 mi) E of Canberra CBD; 15 km (9.3 mi) WNW of Queanbeyan; 91 km (57 mi) SW of Goulburn; 288 km (179 mi) SW of Sydney
- Established: 1928

Government
  - Territory electorate: Kurrajong
  - Federal division: Canberra

Area
  - Total: 3.5 km^{2} (1.4 sq mi)
- Elevation: 570 m (1,870 ft)

Population
  - Total: 1,544 (2021 census)
  - Density: 441/km^{2} (1,143/sq mi)
- Postcode: 2612
Suburbs around Reid
Braddon	Braddon	Ainslie
City	Reid	Campbell
Parkes	Parkes	Russell

Reid is a suburb of Canberra, Australian Capital Territory, Australia. With a population of 1,544 at the 2021 census, located directly next to Civic, Reid is one of the oldest suburbs in Canberra. It is named after George Reid, the fourth prime minister of Australia.

Separating the suburbs of Reid and Campbell is Anzac Parade, a ceremonial boulevarde running along Canberra's primary design axis (the land axis) from Lake Burley Griffin to the Australian War Memorial.

Located in Reid are the Canberra Institute of Technology and St John the Baptist Church, which is the oldest church in Canberra.

== History ==
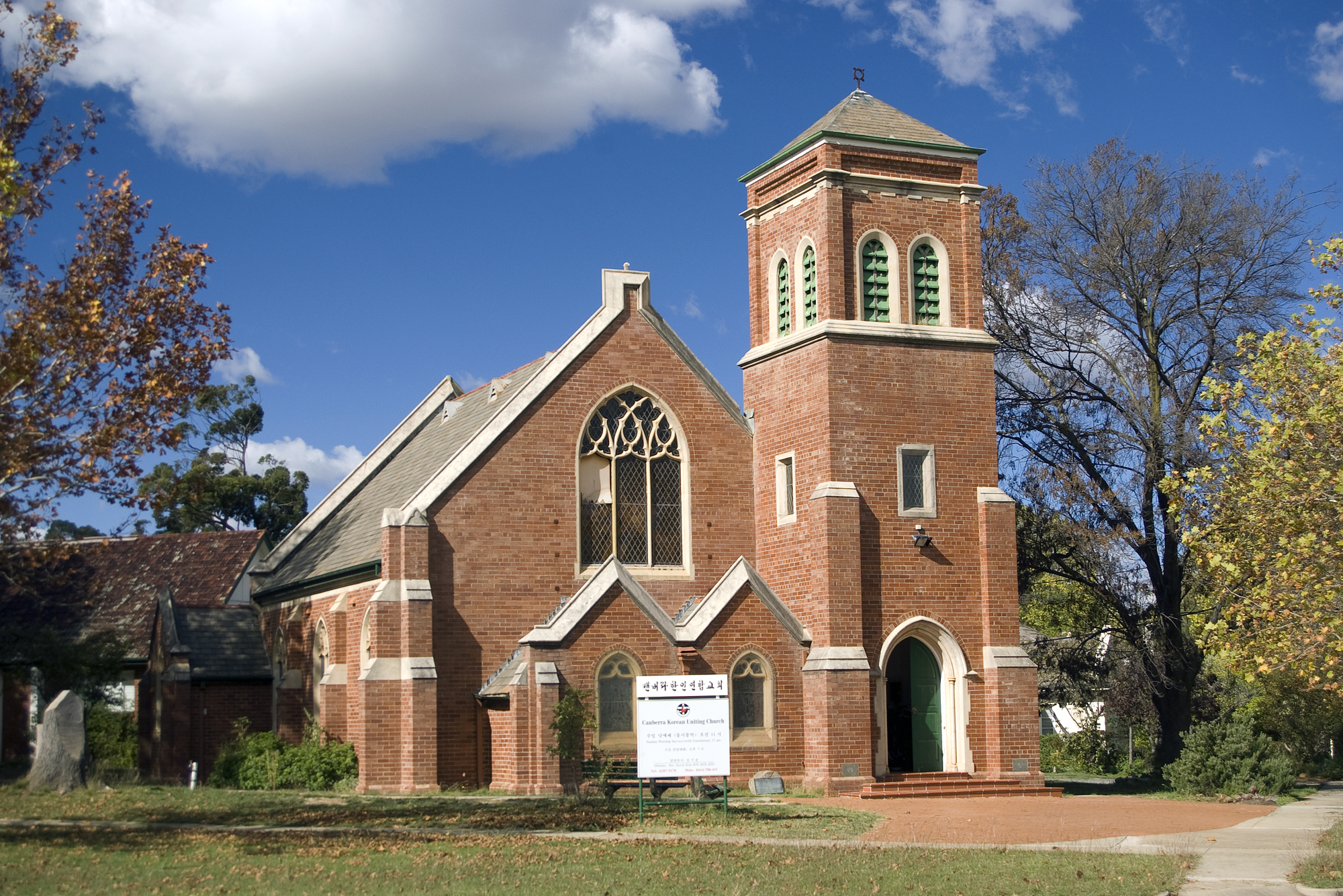
Canberra Korean Uniting Church

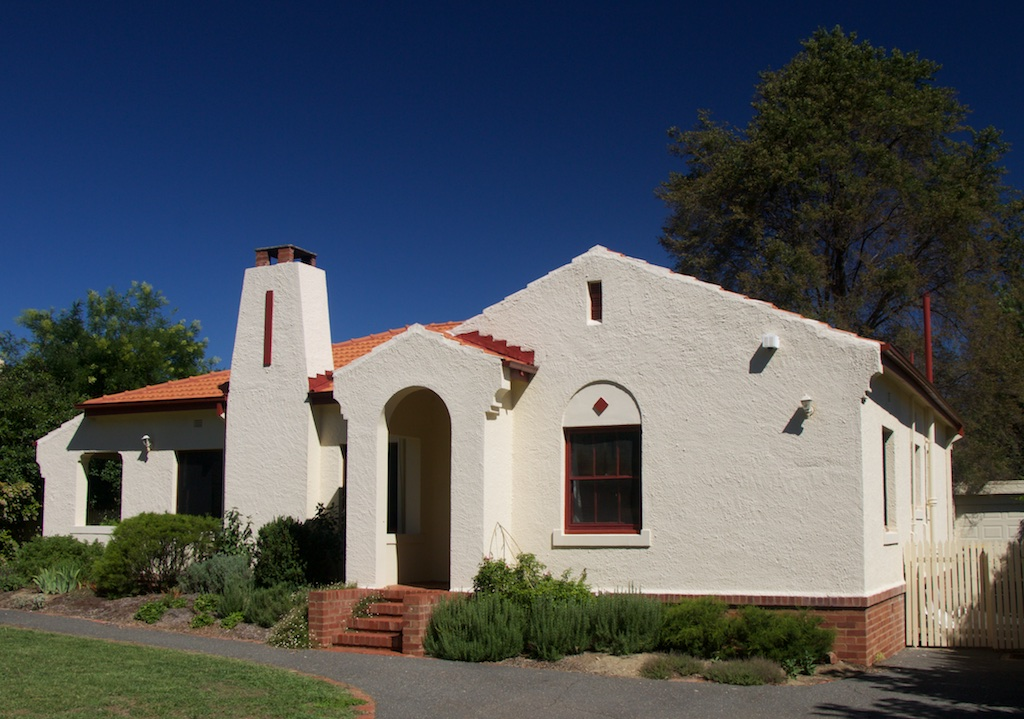
Reid Housing Precinct house

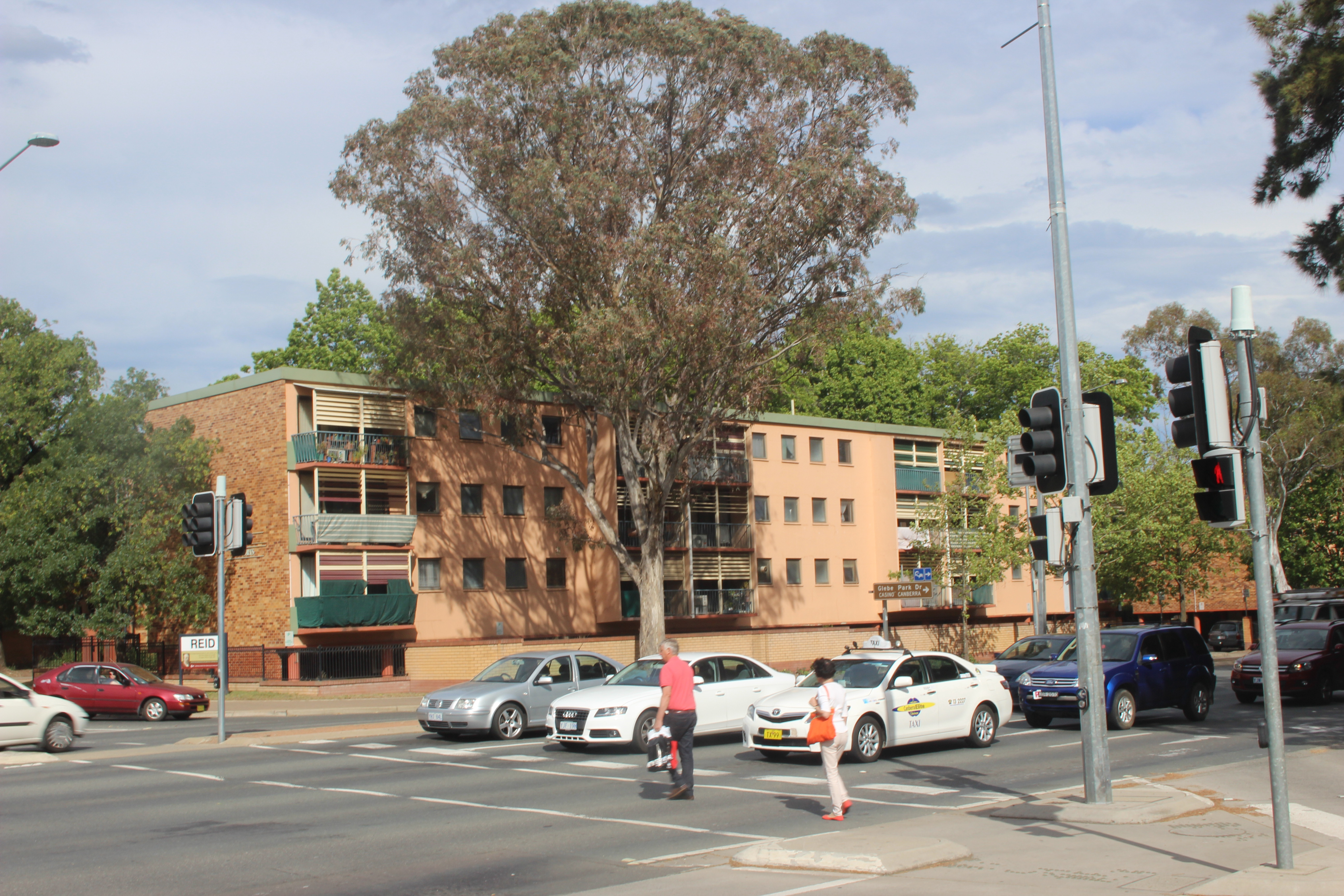
Bega Flats, demolished in 2018

The foundation stone of St John the Baptist Church was laid in 1841 and it was consecrated on 12 March 1845. It listed by the ACT Heritage Council.

Most of the suburb was constructed in 1926 and 1927 to provide housing for public servants in preparation for the opening of the provisional Parliament House in 1927. It was a housing precinct planned on Garden City principles and is now heritage-listed. The Uniting Church (now the Canberra Korean Church) on Coranderrk Street was built in 1927 and is also heritage listed.

Reid was named in 1928 after Australia's fourth Prime Minister, Sir George Reid. It was previously considered to be part of Ainslie. The streets in Reid are named after aboriginal words.

The four-storey Bega flats (containing 114 two-bedroom flats) were completed east of Cooyong street and south of Ainslie in 1957 in order to cope with a critical lack of accommodation for public servants transferred to Canberra. The ACT Heritage Council described them as having been designed in the Post-War International style "similar to post-war housing in Europe, particularly in English new towns. The fine proportions, crisp detailing and low scale of [the Allawah Court] and their siting continuing the street pattern made them more architecturally successful than the three eight-storey blocks of flats along Currong Street" (nearby in Braddon). The Heritage Council declined to heritage list the buildings and despite some local opposition they were demolished in 2017/18 and will be replaced by more modern and denser accommodation along with some commercial uses.

== Demographics ==
At the 2021 census, the population of Reid was 1,544, including 16 (1.0%) Indigenous persons and 986 (63.9%) Australian-born persons. 36.2% of dwellings were separate houses (compared to the Australian average of 72.3%), while 22.0% were semi-detached, row or terrace houses (Australian average: 12.6%) and 41.3% were flats, units or apartments (Australian average: 14.2%). 39.9% of the population were professionals, compared to the Australian average of 24.0%. Notably 21.7% worked in central government administration, compared to the Australian average of 1.1%, although the ACT-wide average was a similar 17.1%. Reid was favoured by students and young adults with 31.6% of its population in the 20 to 34-year-old age group (compared to the Australian average of 20.5%). 49.9% of the population had no religion (compared to the ACT average of 43.5% and the Australian average of 38.4%), 13.9% were Catholic, 9.7% were Anglican, 7.7% had no stated religion and 2.5% were Hindu.

== Politics ==
Reid is located within the federal electorate of Canberra, which is currently represented by Alicia Payne in the House of Representatives. In the ACT Legislative Assembly, Reid is part of the electorate of Kurrajong, which elects five members on the basis of proportional representation, currently two Labor, two Greens and one Liberal.

== Geology ==
Calcareous shale from the Canberra Formation is overlain by Quaternary alluvium. This rock is the limestone of the original title of Canberra "Limestone Plains". Tertiary age pebbly gravels are around Anzac Parade left from when the Molonglo river was at a higher level.

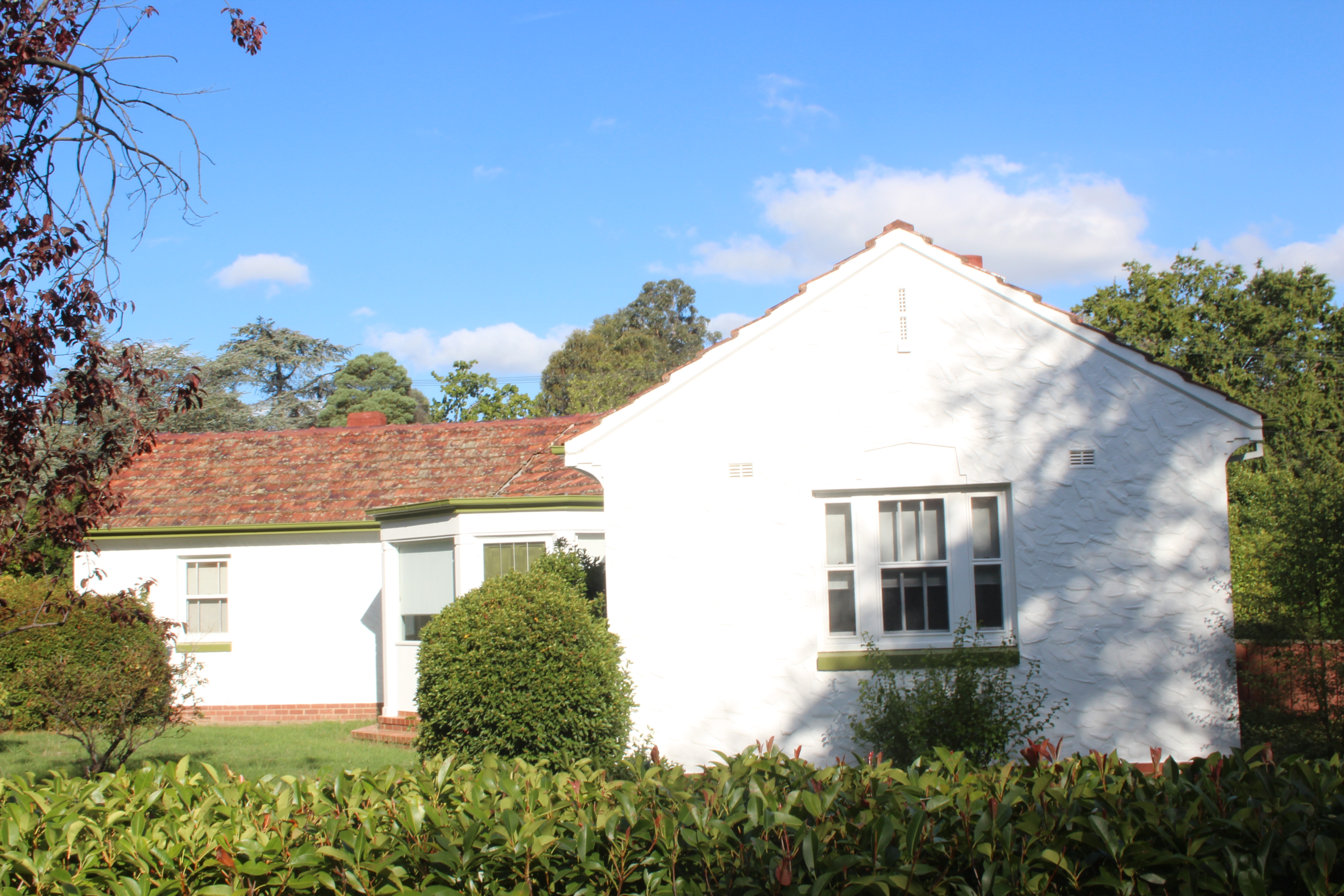
Reid Housing Precinct house

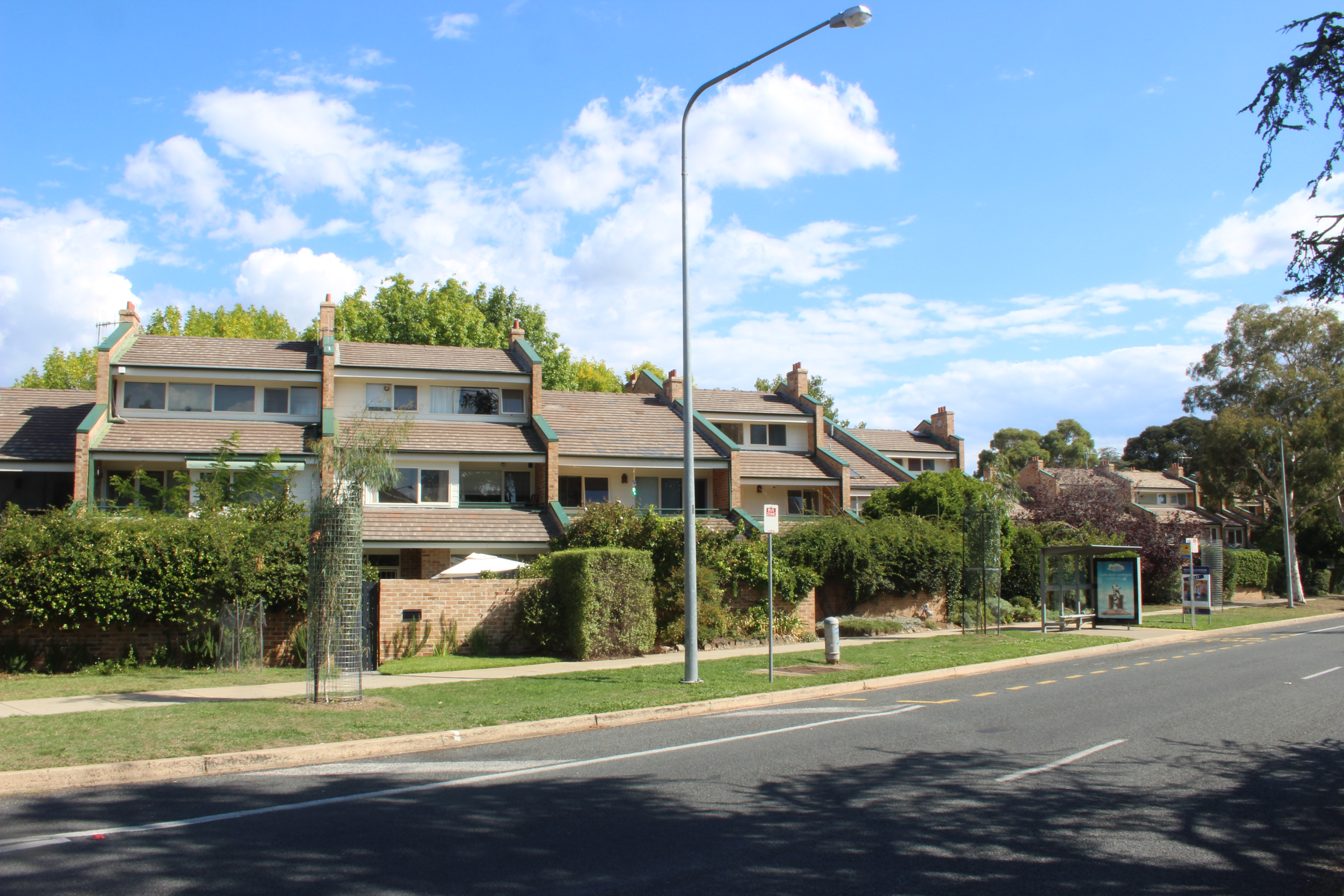
Argyle Apartments

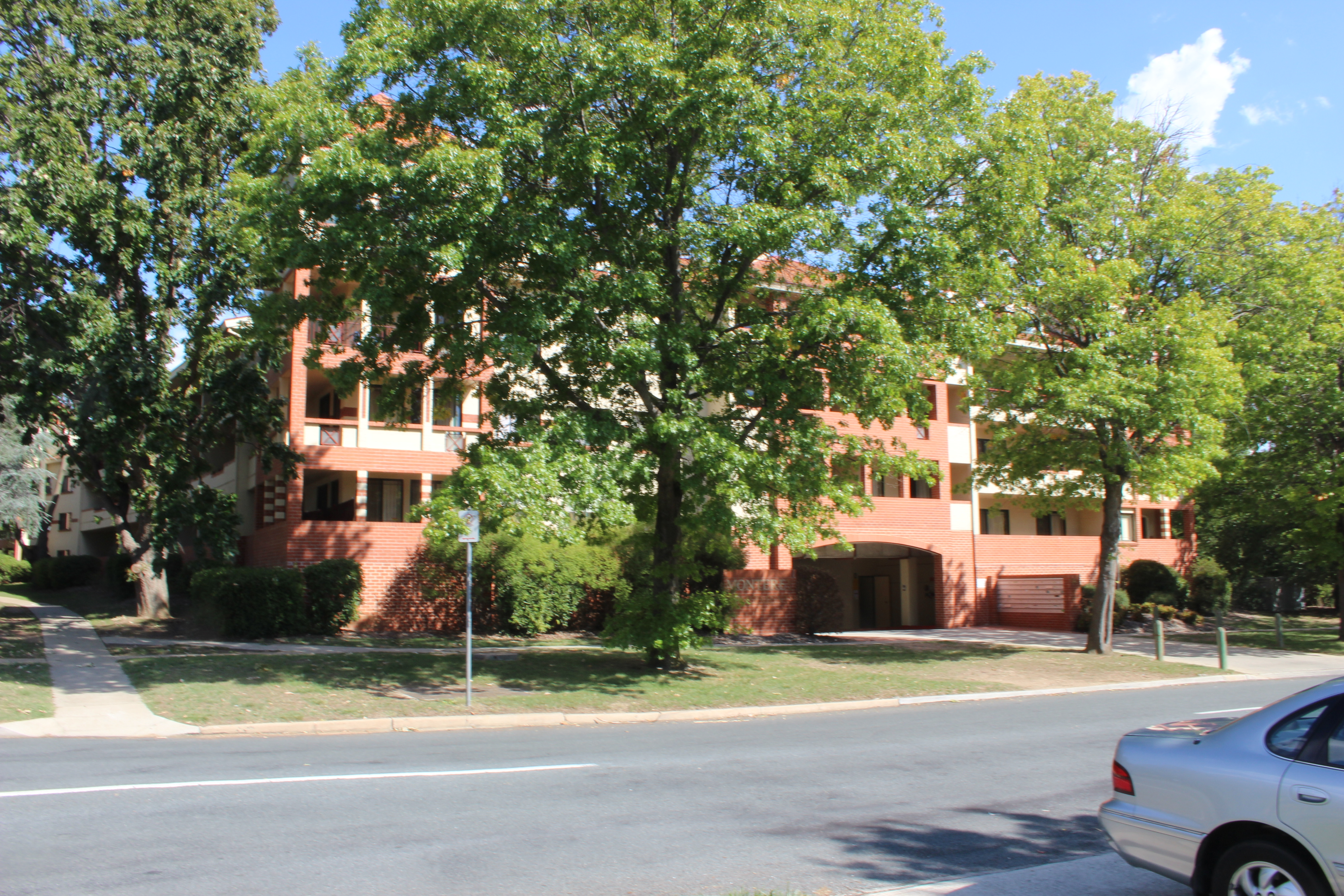
Monterey Apartments
