= John Palmer (Commissary of New South Wales) =

Commissary of New South Wales (1760–1833)

- Born: 17 June 1760; Portsmouth, England
- Died: 27 September 1833 (aged 73); Waddon, Parramatta, New South Wales, Australia
- Spouse: Susan Stillwell (1762–1832)
- Children: George Thomas Palmer (1784–1854) John Westwick Palmer (1786–1787); Henry Westwick Palmer (1787–1788); John Palmer (1798–1839); Stillborn Daughter (1799); Edmund Palmer (1800–1800); Edwin Campbell Palmer (1801–1802) Sophia Susannah Close nee Palmer (1803–1856)
- Parent(s): John Palmer (1727–1808) & Sarah Taylor (Abt 1735–1796)

John Palmer (17 June 1760 – 27 September 1833) was an Australian colonial administrator and farmer who was commissary of New South Wales, responsible for the colony's supplies.

== Life ==
One of eight children, Palmer was born in Portsmouth. He first came to Sydney in 1788 as purser on the Sirius, the flagship of the First Fleet. He was opposed to those who plotted against Governor William Bligh.

In September 1796 he left briefly for England in the Britannia to bring back his family to settle permanently in New South Wales. He returned in November 1800 on board the Porpoise with his wife and two surviving sons out of his then six children. One son had been born on the voyage out at Cape Town, but had died at sea less than one month later and before they had reached Sydney. Also with him was an unmarried naval officer brother Christopher Palmer (1767–1821), and two unmarried sisters Sarah Sophia Palmer (1774–?) and Sophia Palmer (1777–1833). In 1801, Sophia married the merchant Robert Campbell and John Palmer acted as his agent during Campbell's absence in England in 1805 and 1806.

Palmer was appointed commissary general of New South Wales on 2 June 1791. In this post, he was responsible for the reception and issue of all government stores, virtually the only supplies in the colony, and their supplement by purchase from private merchants. He negotiated payment for official business and was empowered to draw bills on the British Treasury. In effect, he kept the public accounts and funds of the colony and was at once official supplier, contractor and banker to the settlement. Whilst in England in the period 1810 to 1814, Palmer was demoted to Assistant Commissary in 1811, but in June 1813 was re-employed in the Commissariat. He returned to New South Wales in May 1814, where he continued to work for the Commissariat until he was retired on half-pay in 1819.

Palmer received his first land grant of 100 acres (40 ha) in 1793, which he named Woolloomooloo Farm. Here, he planted an extensive orchard, built one of the colony's first permanent residences, and elegantly entertained the first rank of colonial society. In 1795, he was described as one of the three principal farmers and stockholders in the colony. In 1803, Palmer was hailed as the first exponent of improved farming methods when he reduced the men employed on his 300-acre (121 ha) Hawkesbury farm from a hundred to fifteen. Also by 1803, he owned several small colonial-built craft. Palmer also owned a windmill on the margin of the Domain and a bakery near the present Conservatorium of Music. In 1818, he was granted 1500 acres (607 ha) at Bathurst, which he named Hambledon, where he ran a handful of stock. In the 1820s, Palmer received a grant in the Limestone Plains known as Jerrabombera. At Waddon, near Parramatta, he farmed 3000 acres (1214 ha), one-third of which was cleared. By the 1830s, he was running more than 3000 sheep and nearly 500 cattle.

In his judicial capacity as a magistrate, which he had been appointed by Lieutenant Governor Francis Grose in 1793, and as one of the principal civil officers, Palmer was familiar with most of the disturbances that occurred in the colony. He was no friend of John Macarthur, or of most of the New South Wales Corps. A supporter of Governor William Bligh, he had in 1809 briefly been placed in gaol in Sydney on a charge of sedition for having declaring New South Wales to be in a state of mutiny. Palmer denied the competency of the court and refused to plead, but was found guilty and sentenced to three months imprisonment and directed to pay a fine of £50. He also continued to refuse to allow Lieutenant Governor George Johnston access to his ledgers without the authority of the British Treasury. In 1810, he was ordered to England with Bligh. Considered a hostile witness by Bligh's opponents, his evidence was considered as indispensable in proving charges against Bligh. Instead he was one of Bligh's chief witnesses against Johnston.

Palmer was a member of the Committee of the Female Orphan Institution from August 1803 to January 1824. As a magistrate, he sat frequently on the bench at Parramatta until dismissed by Governor Sir Thomas Brisbane over a quarrel in 1822. He was restored to the magistracy on 3 November 1825 and continued to sit until within a year or two of his death.

When he died at Waddon near Parramatta on 27 September 1833, he was "the last surviving officer of the first fleet that arrived in this part of His Majesty's Dominions." He was buried on 1 October 1833 in St John's Cemetery, Parramatta in a ceremony performed by Samuel Marsden.
