= Peter Collinson (botanist) =

English botanist (1694–1768)

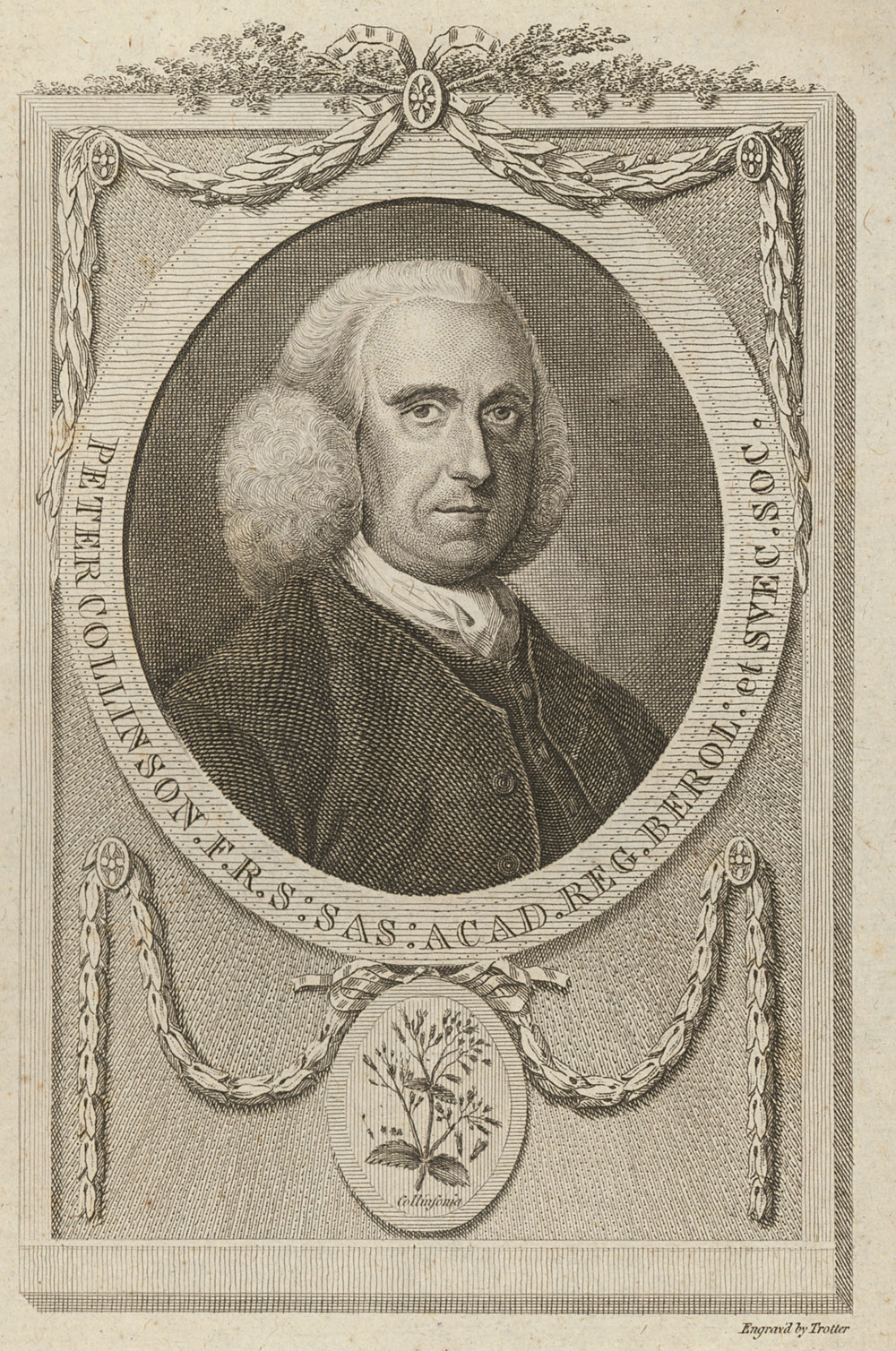
Peter Collinson

Peter Collinson FRS (January 1694 – 11 August 1768) was an English gardener, botanist and horticulturist. A Fellow of the Royal Society and an avid gardener, Collinson served as the middleman for an international exchange of scientific ideas in Georgian era London.

== Life and work ==
Born the son of a London woollen draper, Collinson entered his father's business and developed an interest in botany. His family belonged to the Gracechurch Street Meeting of the Religious Society of Friends (i.e. Quakers).

In October 1728, Collinson wrote to Sir Hans Sloane, President of the Royal Society, about strange events in Kent and on 7 November 1728, he was proposed for Fellowship of the Society.

Collinson supported the struggle of Thomas Coram, William Hogarth, and others to establish a charitable institution that would welcome babies abandoned by their mothers. A royal charter to start the Foundling Hospital was granted by George II on 17 October 1739. The charter lists Collinson as a founding governor.

Although Collinson was a cloth merchant by vocation, largely trading with North America, his real love was gardening. Through his business contacts, he obtained samples of seeds and plants from around the world. Collinson's personal plant collections, first at Peckham and later at Mill Hill became famous. He came to realise that there was a market for such things in England and, in the late 1730s, began to import North American botanical seeds for English collectors to grow through financing the travels of John Bartram. Yearly, he distributed the New World seeds collected by Bartram to British gentry, nurserymen, and natural scientists including Dillenius, Philip Miller, Lord Petre, the Dukes of Richmond and Norfolk, James Gordon, John Busch, etc. Collinson was also the patron of the artist and natural historian Mark Catesby. His presentation copy of Catesby's Natural History of Carolina, Florida and the Bahama Islands was passed down to his grandson Charles Streynsham Collinson (1753-1834) and was sold for £15 10s after his death

Collinson maintained an extensive correspondence and was friendly with notable scientists in London and abroad including Sloane, Carl Linnaeus, Gronovius, Dr. John Fothergill, Cadwallader Colden, and Benjamin Franklin. Collinson was a particular patron of the Philadelphia scientific community assisting the fledgling American Philosophical Society founded by Bartram and Franklin in 1743. He also served for many years as the purchasing agent for the Library Company of Philadelphia. It was through Collinson that Franklin first communicated to the Royal Society what would in 1751 be published as Experiments and Observations on Electricity.

He was elected a foreign member of the Royal Swedish Academy of Sciences in 1747.

Whilst living in Mill Hill, he lived in what is now the Ridgeway House boarding house of Mill Hill School. Furthermore, the school also has a Collinson House and more recently a Cedars House, named after the trees Collinson planted.
