= Robert Campbell (Australian politician, born 1769) =

Australian politician (1769–1846)

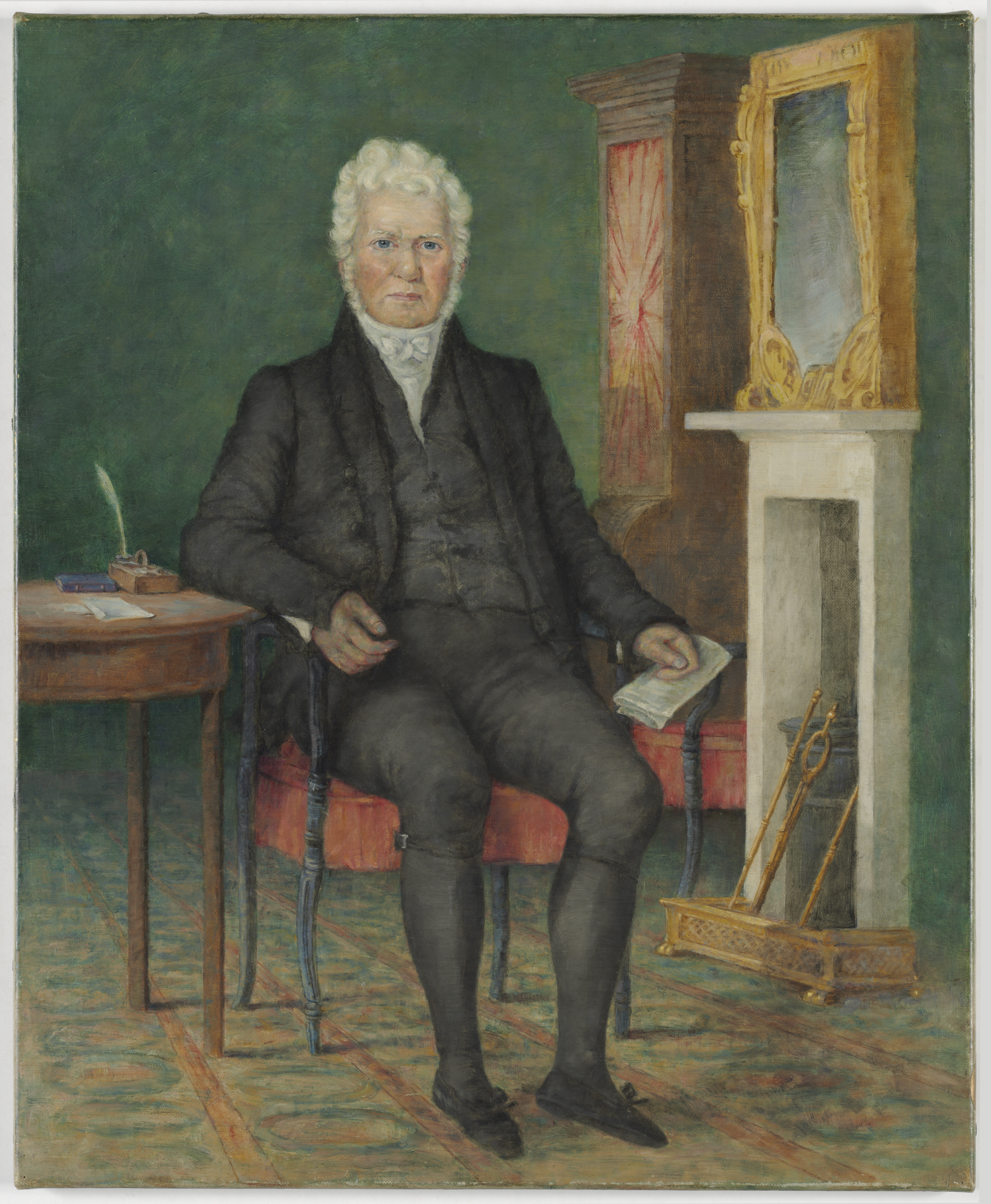
- 1834 portrait by Rodius
- Born: 28 April 1769; Greenock, Inverclyde, Scotland
- Died: 15 April 1846 (aged 77); Duntroon, near Queanbeyan, New South Wales, Australia (Now known as Duntroon, Canberra, Australian Capital Territory, Australia)
- Spouse: Sophia Palmer (1777–1833)
- Children: John Campbell (1802–1886); Robert Campbell (1804–1859); Sophia Ives Campbell (1807–1809); Charles Campbell (1810–1888); Sarah Jeffreys nee Campbell (1815–?); George P. Campbell (1818–1881); Frederick Marsden Campbell (1821–1885)
- Parent(s): John Campbell (1728–1794) (9th Laird of Ashfield) & Agnes Paterson (1729–1792)

Robert Campbell (28 April 1769 – 15 April 1846) was a Scottish-born Australian merchant and politician who was a member of the first New South Wales Legislative Council. Campbell, a suburb of Canberra was named in his honour, as well as Campbell Island in the New Zealand Subantarctic Islands.

== Early life ==
Campbell was born in Greenock, Inverclyde, Scotland on 28 April 1769, the son of John Campbell.

When he was 27, he moved to India to join his older brother John. In India, he and his brother were partners in Campbell Clark & Co., merchants of Calcutta, which in July 1799 became Campbell & Co. after the Clarkes gave up their interest in the firm.

In 1798, Robert Campbell, with a cargo from Calcutta, visited Sydney to develop a trading connexion there, and he also purchased some land at Dawes Point, near the western entrance of Sydney Cove. In February 1800, he returned to Sydney with another cargo to both settle in Sydney, and to establish a branch of Campbell & Co. In 1801, he married Sophia Palmer (1777–1833), sister of the commissary John Palmer.

== Career ==
After settling in Sydney, he built the private Campbell's wharf and warehouses on his land at Dawes Point, and developed a large business as a general merchant.

In the early years, Campbell & Co.'s business dealings involved importing goods and spirits from Calcutta for sale in Sydney, but not all voyages were successful. For example, in 1802, the Campbell & Co. brig Fly, captained by John Black, and "laden with piece and other valuable goods" was lost at sea on its return voyage from Kolkata to Sydney. Despite losses such as this, Campbell & Co. was heavily involved in the Australian trade, having £50,000 worth of goods in its Sydney warehouses in 1804. As part of its import business, the firm also fulfilled government contracts for supplies from India, mainly livestock for the Sydney and Derwent settlements, which Governor Philip Gidley King calculated had brought Campbell's firm £16,000 from the government alone between 1800 and 1804.

Campbell was the full or part owner of eight whaling/sealing vessels that made 17 voyages for him between 1805 and 1833.

With food supplies of the colony under threat following the Hawkesbury floods in 1806, Campbell's ship, the Sydney, was chartered by Governor King, and on 14 April 1806, proceeded to Calcutta to return with 400 tons of rice or wheat. Unfortunately, the ship was wrecked on a reef off the coast of New Guinea, but no lives wore lost. In compensation he was granted £3,000, 4,000 acres (16 km^{2}) of land and 710 sheep.

In 1807, Campbell was appointed a magistrate, naval officer, treasurer of public funds. The same year, he built Australia's first shipbuilding yards, at the site of the current Royal Sydney Yacht Squadron, Kirribilli.

In 1809, Campbell chartered a ship the Brothers and sent it on a sealing expedition to New Zealand under Captain Robert Mason. He probably intended it to go to Solander Island in Foveaux Strait but instead, in November, it landed a gang on two islets on what is now the coast of the city of Dunedin on the southeast coast of the South Island. These are the first identifiable Europeans recorded as landing in the area, although others probably preceded them. The gang included the ex-convict William Tucker. When the Brothers returned to relieve its men it found only Tucker and Daniel Wilson at Otago Harbour where it anchored on 3 May 1810. This is the first reference to a European ship entering the harbour although others had probably preceded it. Tucker would later return and become the first European to settle in the area. While it was no part of his intention Campbell was thus instrumental in bringing the territory which is now Dunedin into the European sphere.

In 1825, Campbell was appointed to the Legislative Council. He served in the council until 1843.

== Personal life ==
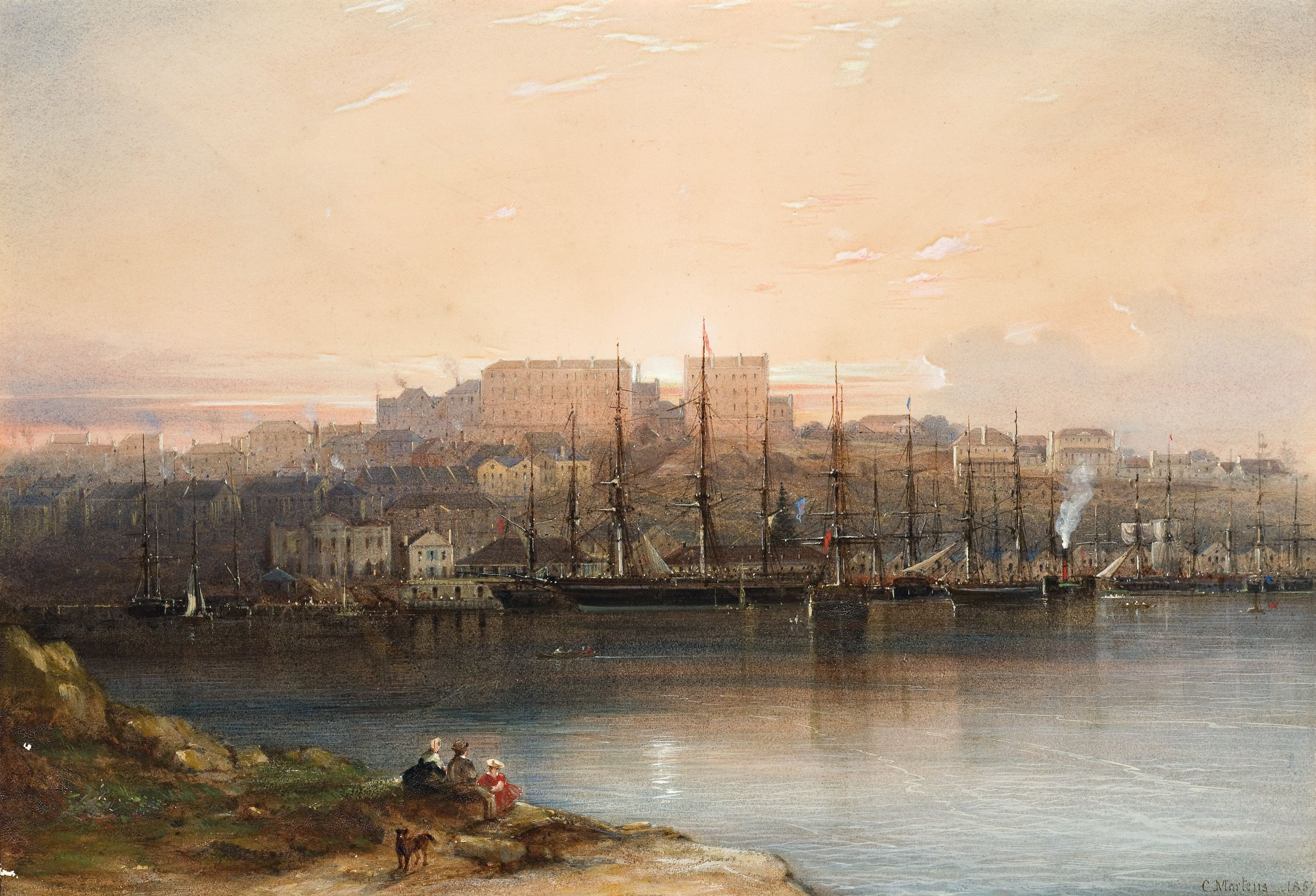
Conrad Martens, Campbell's Wharf, 1857, National Gallery of Australia

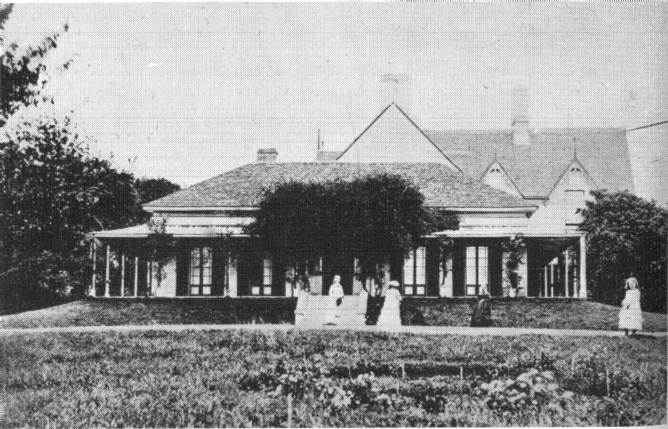
Duntroon Homestead

In 1825, James Ainslie established a sheep station called Pialligo for Campbell in the area where Canberra is now situated. In 1846, Robert renamed the property Duntroon after his ancestral Duntrune Castle, Argyll and Bute, Scotland.

Campbell died later that year at Duntroon on 15 April 1846.

In 1910, with the creation of the Australian Capital Territory, the government acquired Duntroon for the creation of the Royal Military College. The original Duntroon homestead (though later extended) is now the officers mess in the Royal Military College.

Campbell had seven children, John, Robert, Sophia, Charles, Sarah, George and Frederick. John, Robert and Charles became politicians like their father, all being on the Legislative Council, and John and Robert also being on the Legislative Assembly. His grandson Frederick Campbell was involved in the formative years of rugby union in Australia with the Wallaroo Football Club and Sydney University Football Club in the late 1860s and early 1870s.
