= World War II Aeroplane Hangar, Tocumwal =

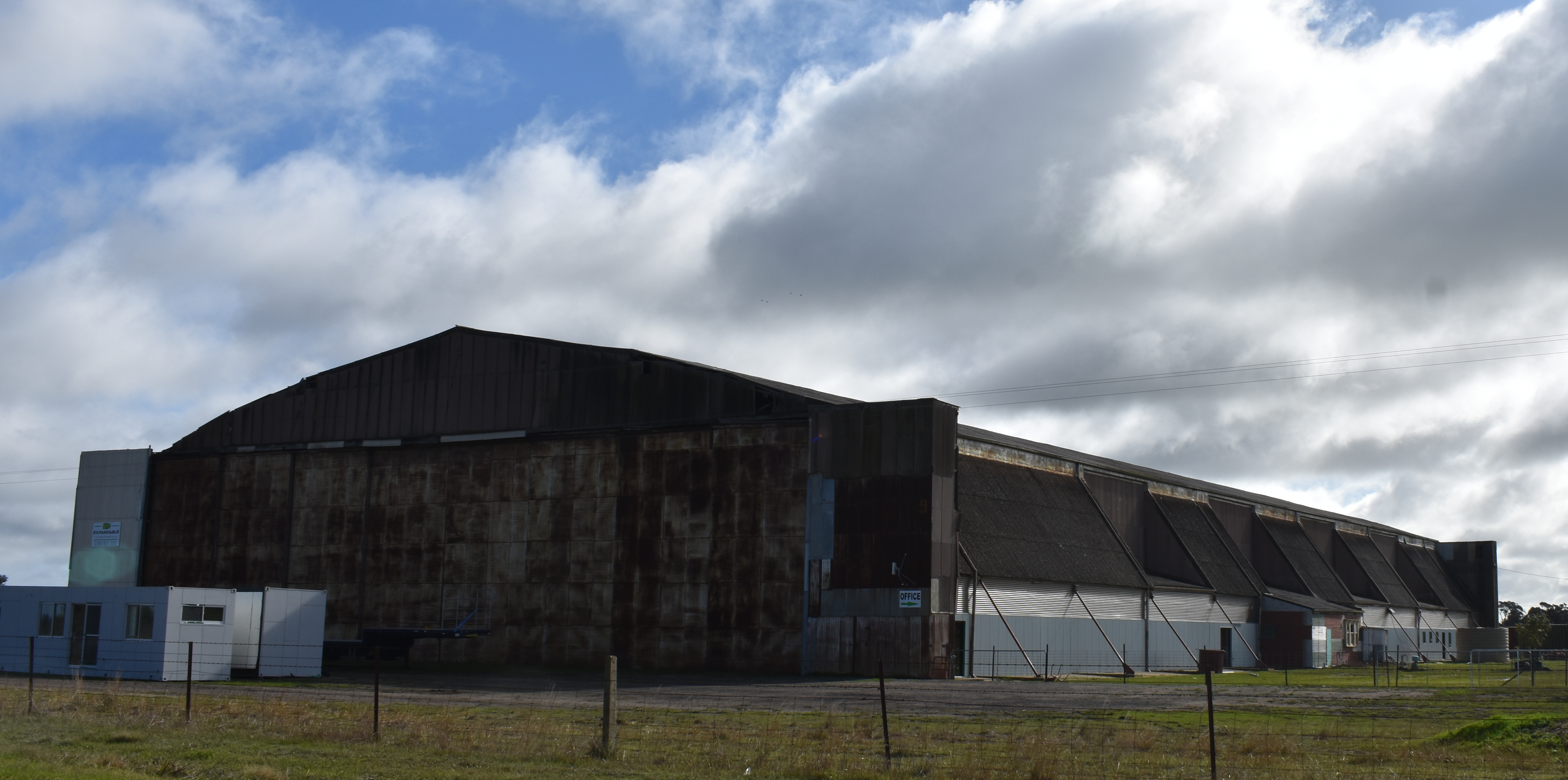
- The hangar in 2021

- Location within New South Wales Location within Australia
- 35.7945°S 145.6068°E
- Location: 243 McCullochs Road, Tocumwal, Berrigan Shire. New South Wales, Australia

History
- Built: 1942
- Built for: United States Army Air Forces, Royal Australian Air Force

Site notes
- Architect(s): Works and Services Branch of the Commonwealth Government

New South Wales Heritage Register
- Official name: World War II Aeroplane Hangar, Tocumwal
- Type: state heritage (built)
- Designated: 25 June 2021
- Reference no.: 2054
- Type: Aircraft Hangar
- Category: Defence
- Builders: Allied Works Council

World War II Aeroplane Hangar, Tocumwal is a heritage-listed former Royal Australian Air Force (RAAF) aircraft hangar at Tocumwal, in Berrigan Shire, New South Wales, Australia. The hangar was constructed in 1942 by the Allied Works Council as part of the construction of RAAF Station Tocumwal. The hangar was added to the New South Wales State Heritage Register on 25 July 2021.

== Heritage listing ==
The World War II Aeroplane Hangar at Tocumwal has historical, social and cultural significance. The hangar was built in 1942 to store and maintain B-24 Liberator bomber aircraft at McIntyre Field. The hangar is significant because of its association with the response to the fear of invasion during WWII and its location on the largest air base in the Southern Hemisphere at that time.

The hangar design represents an innovative Australian industry solution to the steel shortage during WWII. The design, produced by the Works and Services Branch of the Commonwealth Government and constructed by the Allied Works Council, was adapted to use unseasoned Australian hardwoods. The gable shaped trusses were fabricated with shear connectors and steel plate joints and, at 39.6 metres (130 ft), the Modified Type 3A hangars remain the longest, clear span gable-shaped truss buildings known in Australia.

The hangar has social significance to surviving United States Army Air Forces (USAAF), Australian Royal Australian Air Force (RAAF) and Women's Auxiliary Australian Air Force (WAAAF) personnel that served and trained at Tocumwal and is a legacy to their families. It is also significant to the people of Tocumwal and visitors to the Murray River region. Moreover, it is significant as a large local landmark.

World War II Aeroplane Hangar, Tocumwal was listed on the New South Wales State Heritage Register on 25 June 2021 having satisfied the following criteria.

The place is important in demonstrating the course, or pattern, of cultural or natural history in New South Wales.

The item is historically significant as one of the longest clear span gable-shaped truss buildings known in Australia and as physical evidence of the history of the early period of the Pacific War when the USAAF was deployed to Australia. Built in 1942 at 'McIntyre Field', the hangar was used to store and maintain B-24 Liberator bomber aircraft. McIntyre Field was constructed by the Allied Works Council as a temporary air force base as part of the Allied response to the fear of invasion during WWII. Used by the United States Army Air Force (later taken over by the RAAF and renamed Tocumwal Airfield), McIntyre Field was Australia's largest air base and the largest in the Southern Hemisphere in 1942. The hangar is significant as being part of the first major construction project of the Allied Works Council using the Civilian Constructional Corps.

The place has a strong or special association with a person, or group of persons, of importance of cultural or natural history of New South Wales's history.

The item is historically significant because of its association with the USAAF and RAAF whose personnel trained and served at McIntyre Field and later, Tocumwal Airfield. It was also the earliest designated training centre in the South-West Pacific for Liberators (B-24s), the second of the American heavy bombers produced in WWII, marking the first US Army Air Corps-Australian Government-RAAF collaboration. By February 1944, the formation of No. 7 Operational Training Unit (Heavy Bomber) was officially formed with a staff of 4,000, including 290 WAAAF women. The Liberator is an icon in the history of Australia's aviation heritage and development, and a monument to Australia's military resolve to resist a would-be invader.

The place is important in demonstrating aesthetic characteristics and/or a high degree of creative or technical achievement in New South Wales.

The item is aesthetically significant because of its landmark qualities. Its sheer size gives it a powerful presence and its proximity to the rural town of Tocumwal emphasises the strategic location and scope of the USAAF and later RAAF airfield during WWII. It is one of the few remaining regional inland sites which retains some sense of war operations.

The item also demonstrates a high degree of creative and technical achievement as the design of the Modified Type 3A hangar was the Australian industry solution to the steel shortage during WWII (Brew, 2001; Nolan, 1994). The design was produced by the Works and Services Branch of the Commonwealth Government and constructed by the Allied Works Council. This adaptation to use unseasoned Australian hardwoods was employed for the first time at Tocumwal.

The place has strong or special association with a particular community or cultural group in New South Wales for social, cultural or spiritual reasons.

The item is socially significant because the former McIntyre Field is of great importance to surviving USAAF and Australian RAAF and WAAAF personnel that served and trained at Tocumwal and is a legacy to their families.

The hangar is a significant landmark from WWII and has strong connections to the people of Tocumwal, to the people of Murray River Valley, and to the other major surviving aerodromes and associated sites in NSW.

The associated sites and structures at Tocumwal are significant remaining WWII landmarks which visitors seek out and which are examples of the main features of buildings and sites that characterised the USAAF and RAAF airfields at the time.

The presence of the USAAF and RAAF during and after wartime contributed to the growth of the town. The association of the hangars and airfield form an important part of Tocumwal's cultural identity and are a reminder of great urgency to protect Australia during WWII and what people can achieve in a very short period of time.

The place has potential to yield information that will contribute to an understanding of the cultural or natural history of New South Wales.

The item is technically and research significant because of the technical innovations of the hangar and the role of the airfield both of which made important contributions to Australia's effort in World War II.

The hangar is an example of an innovative Australian adaptation of US building technology using short lengths of local unseasoned hardwoods and are a remarkable technical and engineering achievement. The innovative construction methods are intrinsic to the cultural significance of the hangars. The methods demonstrate Australian response to wartime demands and shortage of materials. They also represent a changing approach to timber construction from the more traditional European practices to the development of Australian timber building practices.

The new technique of fabricating the gable shaped trusses with shear connectors and steel plate joints features in the hangars at Tocumwal which were the first large structures to use unseasoned green timber. They are unique examples of the first recorded long-span trusses that used timber as tension web members and are among the longest clear span gable-shaped truss buildings known in Australia.

The place possesses uncommon, rare or endangered aspects of the cultural or natural history of New South Wales.

The item is rare in relation to its unique role as the earliest designated training centre in the South-West Pacific for Liberators (B-24s) and the first US Army Air Corps-Australian Government-RAAF collaboration in WWII. The hangar is a rare and intact example of the adaption of a steel structural design to use unseasoned Australian hardwoods and represents a modest innovative design solution to the problems of using wood rather than steel and is one of three remaining Modified Type 3A hangars in the State.

The place is important in demonstrating the principal characteristics of a class of cultural or natural places/environments in New South Wales.

The item is important in demonstrating the characteristics of WWII infrastructure because of its size, innovative construction, strategic location and its role in the training of RAAF personnel for the war effort. It also illustrates the scale of American logistical thinking, including the large-scale deployment of aviation and military facilities in support of the WWII Pacific campaign.
