= O'Connor, Australian Capital Territory =

Suburb of Canberra, Australia

O'Connor
- Suburb
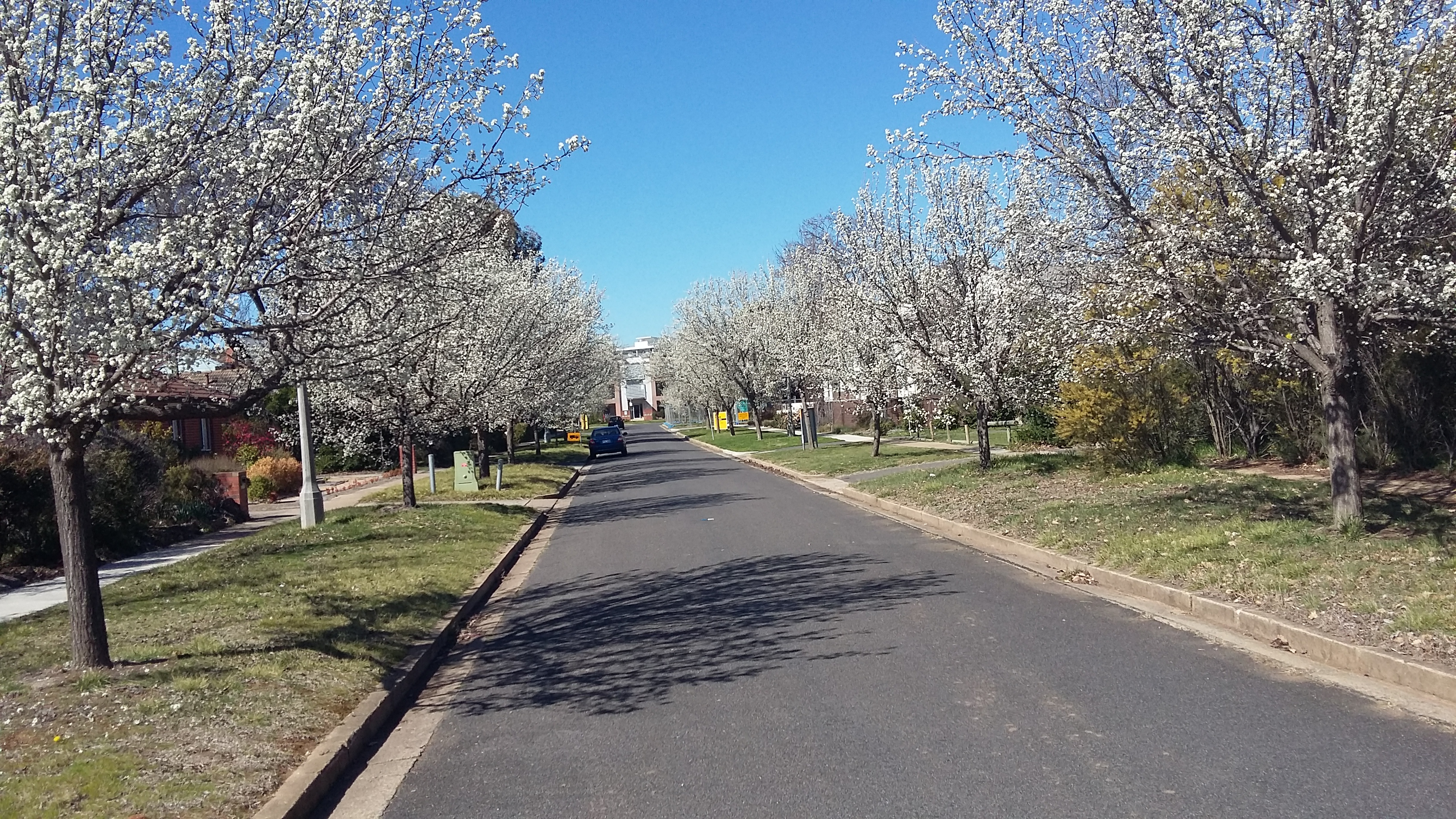
- Verdon Street, 2015

- Coordinates: 35°15′33″S 149°07′16″E
- Country: Australia
- State: Australian Capital Territory
- City: Canberra
- District: North Canberra
- Location: 3 km (1.9 mi) N of Canberra CBD; 18 km (11 mi) NW of Queanbeyan; 88 km (55 mi) SW of Goulburn; 285 km (177 mi) SW of Sydney
- Established: 1928

Government
  - Territory electorate: Kurrajong
  - Federal division: Canberra

Area
  - Total: 4.9 km^{2} (1.9 sq mi)
- Elevation: 571 m (1,873 ft)

Population
  - Total: 5,917 (2021 census)
  - Density: 1,208/km^{2} (3,130/sq mi)
- Postcode: 2602
Suburbs around O'Connor
Kaleen	Kaleen	Lyneham
Bruce	O'Connor	Lyneham
Black Mountain	Acton	Turner

O'Connor is a suburb of Canberra, Australia in the North Canberra district characterised by its leafy, heritage listed streets. It was named after Richard Edward O'Connor (1851–1912), who was a judge in the High Court and a founder of the Australian constitution. Street names in O'Connor are named after explorers, Australian flora, legislators and pioneers. The suburb name was gazetted on 20 September 1928.

O'Connor is bounded by Wattle and David streets, and also includes the Bruce/O'Connor ridge nature reserve, the hilly area with many trees that lies between the houses in O'Connor, and the Australian Institute of Sport (in the suburb of Bruce). Sports such as soccer, rugby and cricket are often played at the ovals at O'Connor district playing fields.

O'Connor has a small shopping centre with a pub/bar, small grocery store, a couple of restaurants and a pharmacy.

== Character ==
The suburb is characterised by leafy streets and detached single dwelling houses. In the central part of O'Connor are a series of cul de sacs which contain houses which are known as Tocumwal Houses. These are heritage listed ex-government housing which were transported from RAAF Station Tocumwal after the Second World War to cover the housing shortage in Canberra in the 1950s.

The ACT Heritage Council has also listed the Scout Hall at the corner of Hovea Street and Boronia Drive. It was originally built as a mess hall for construction workers at Old Parliament House and was later moved to Kingston and used as an office of the United Friendly Society. In 1959, it was moved to O'Connor to become a Scout Hall.

A number of Aboriginal places on the Bruce and O’Connor Ridges are also on the heritage list.

The small part of the suburb to the east of Sullivans Creek has been redeveloped under a policy permitting two and three-storey flats.

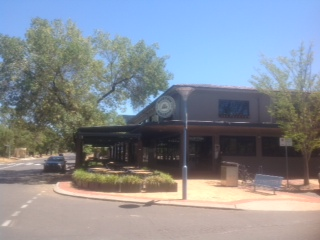
O'Connor shops

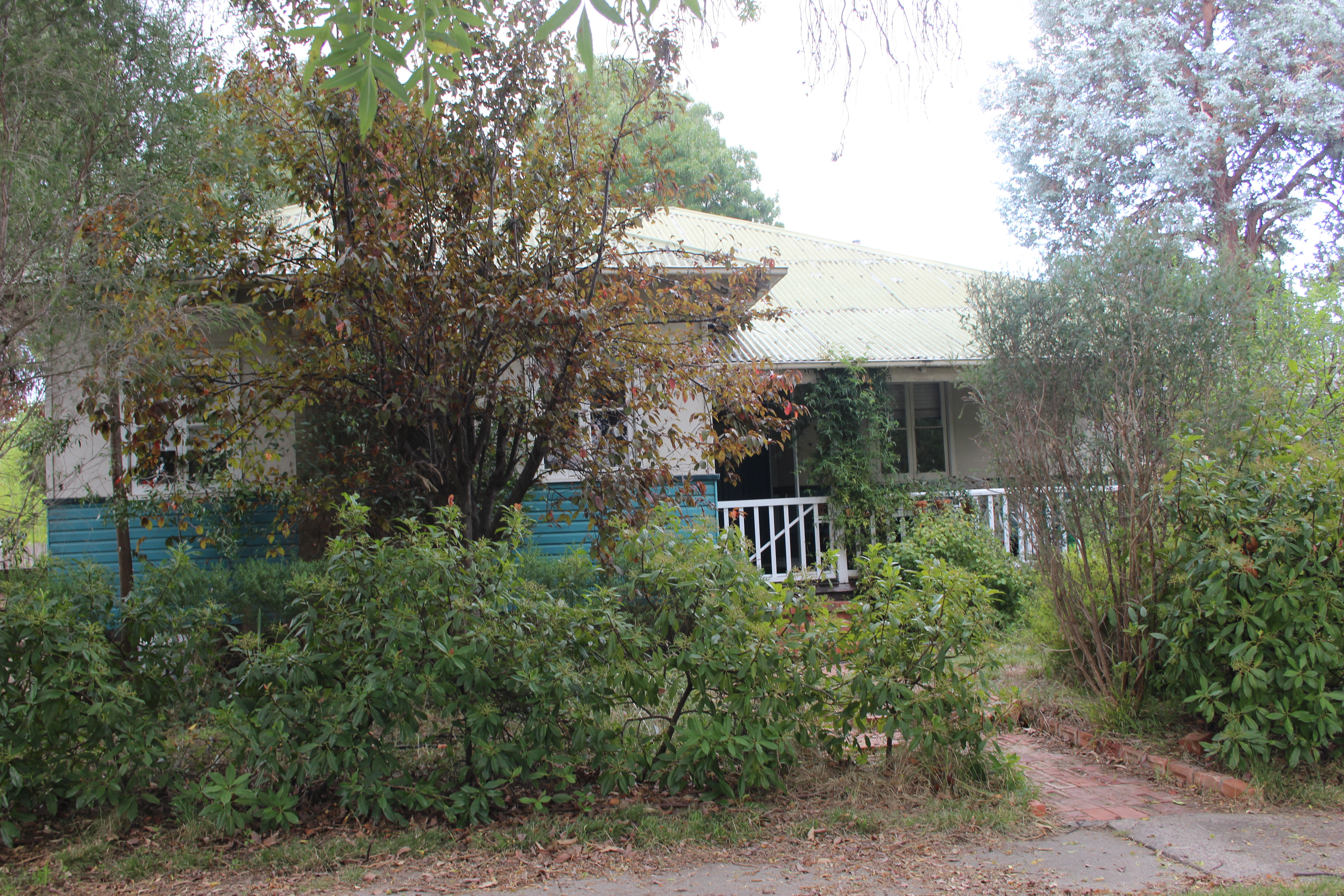
Tocumwal House in Todd Street

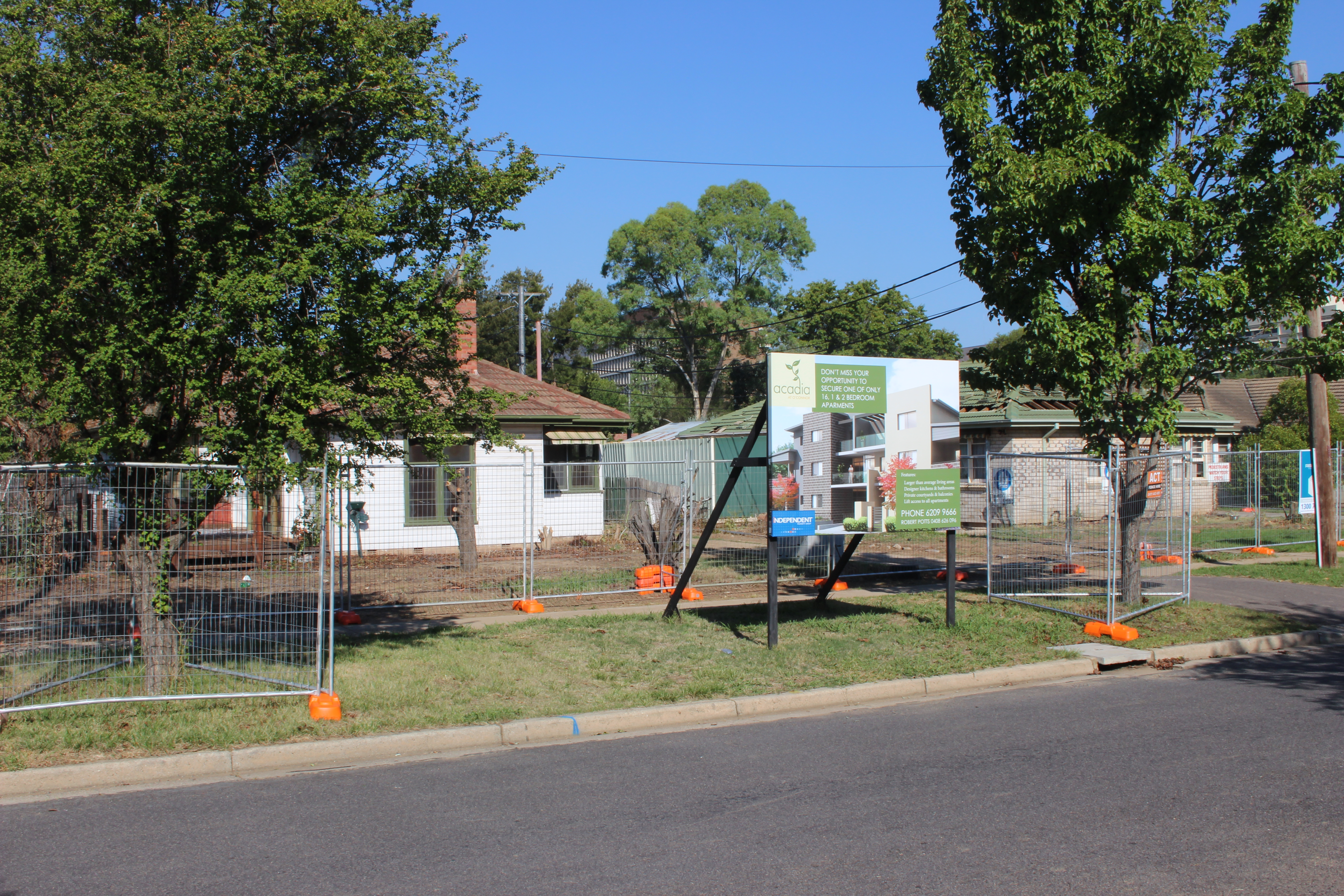
Houses being demolished to make way for three-storey units in Berrigan Crescent

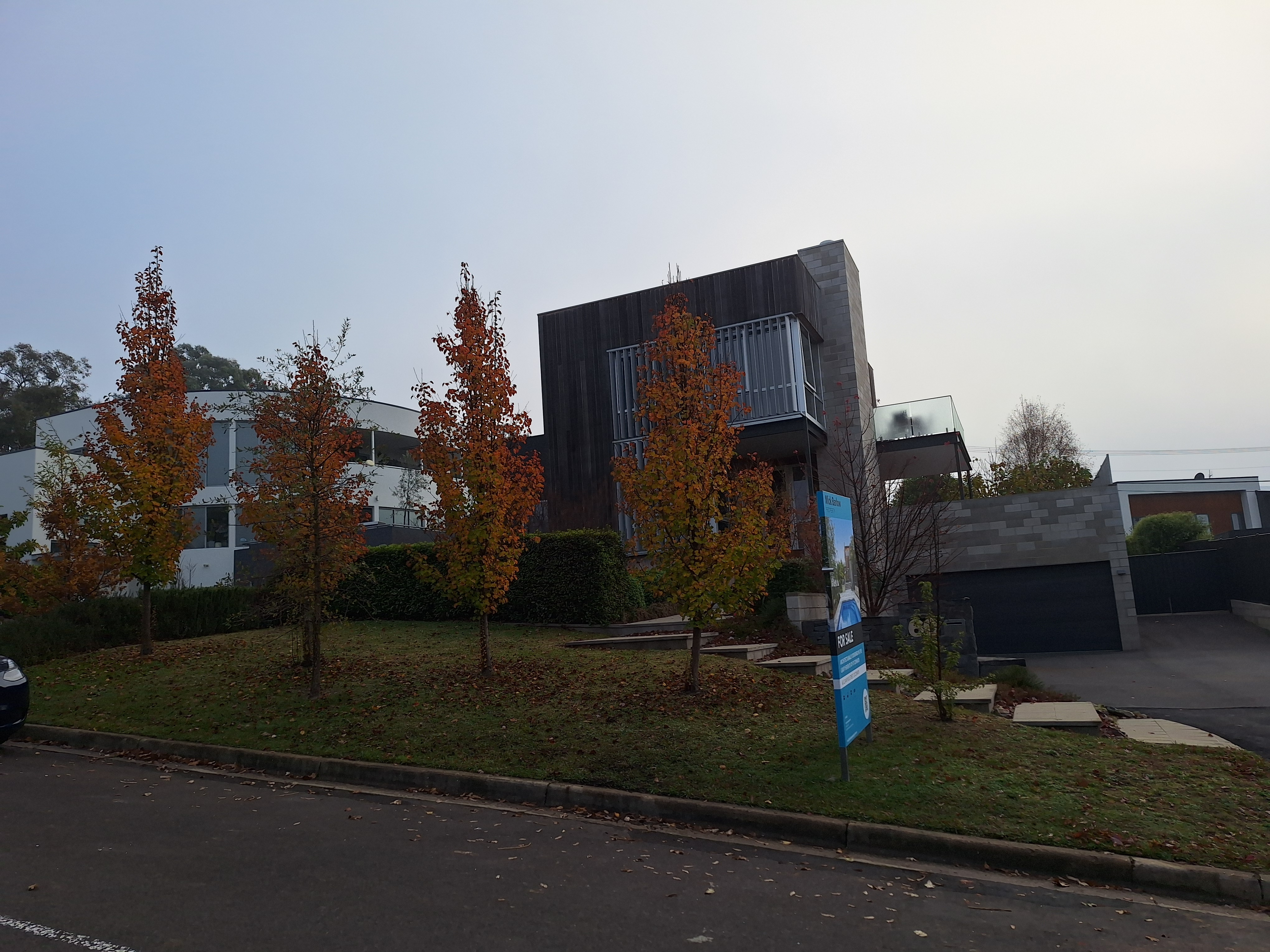
Homes on Clianthus Street, on the lower reaches of O'Connor Ridge, O'Connor.

== Suburb amenities ==
The O'Connor Cooperative School (a government run early childhood school) and St Joseph's primary school (run by the Catholic Church) are both located in O'Connor. The Anglican church of St Philip's in O'Connor was dedicated in 1961, and consecrated in 1981. The O'Connor Ridge is a large strip of land that is use for bush walking and mountain biking and is a part of the Canberra Nature Park. At the O'Connor shops there can be found, a bar and restaurant, a supermarket, a hairdresser, a bicycle shop, a dentist, a pharmacy, a florist, and a Vietnamese restaurant. Along the road from these are Canberra's Alliance Française, a Croatian Club and a Polish Club.

== Demographics ==
At the 2021 census, the population of O'Connor was 5,917, including 81 (1.4%) Indigenous persons and 4,289 (72.5%) Australian-born persons. 66.0% of dwellings were separate houses (compared to the Australian average of 72.3%), while 15.7% were semi-detached, row or terrace houses (Australian average: 12.6%) and 18.5% were flats, units or apartments (Australian average: 14.2%). 40.2% of the population were professionals, compared to the Australian average of 24.0%. Notably 18.9% worked in central government administration, compared to the Australian average of 1.1%, although the ACT-wide average is a similar 17.1%. 57.1% of the population had no religion, compared to the ACT average of 43.5% and the Australian average of 38.4%.

The weekly median family income was $3,463 and the weekly median household income was $2,518, against ACT values of $2,872 and $2,372 respectively.

The Statistical Areas Level 1 (SAL1) data for the 2021 Census indicated a median weekly family income variability across O'Connor's SAL1 divisions of $2,625 to $4,166.

== Politics ==
O'Connor is located within the federal electorate of Canberra and it is represented by Alicia Payne for the Labor Party. In the ACT Legislative Assembly, Lyneham is part of the electorate of Kurrajong, which elects five members on the basis of proportional representation, two Labor, two Greens and one Liberal.

== Geology ==
Calcareous shales from the Canberra Formation is overlain by Quaternary alluvium. This rock is the limestone of the original title of Canberra "Limestone Plains". The higher parts of O'Connor in the west are different. Towards the south near Black Mountain is the Black Mountain Sandstone. Towards the north, and including O'Connor Ridge can be found Greywacke from the Ordovician age Pittman Formation.

== Gallery ==
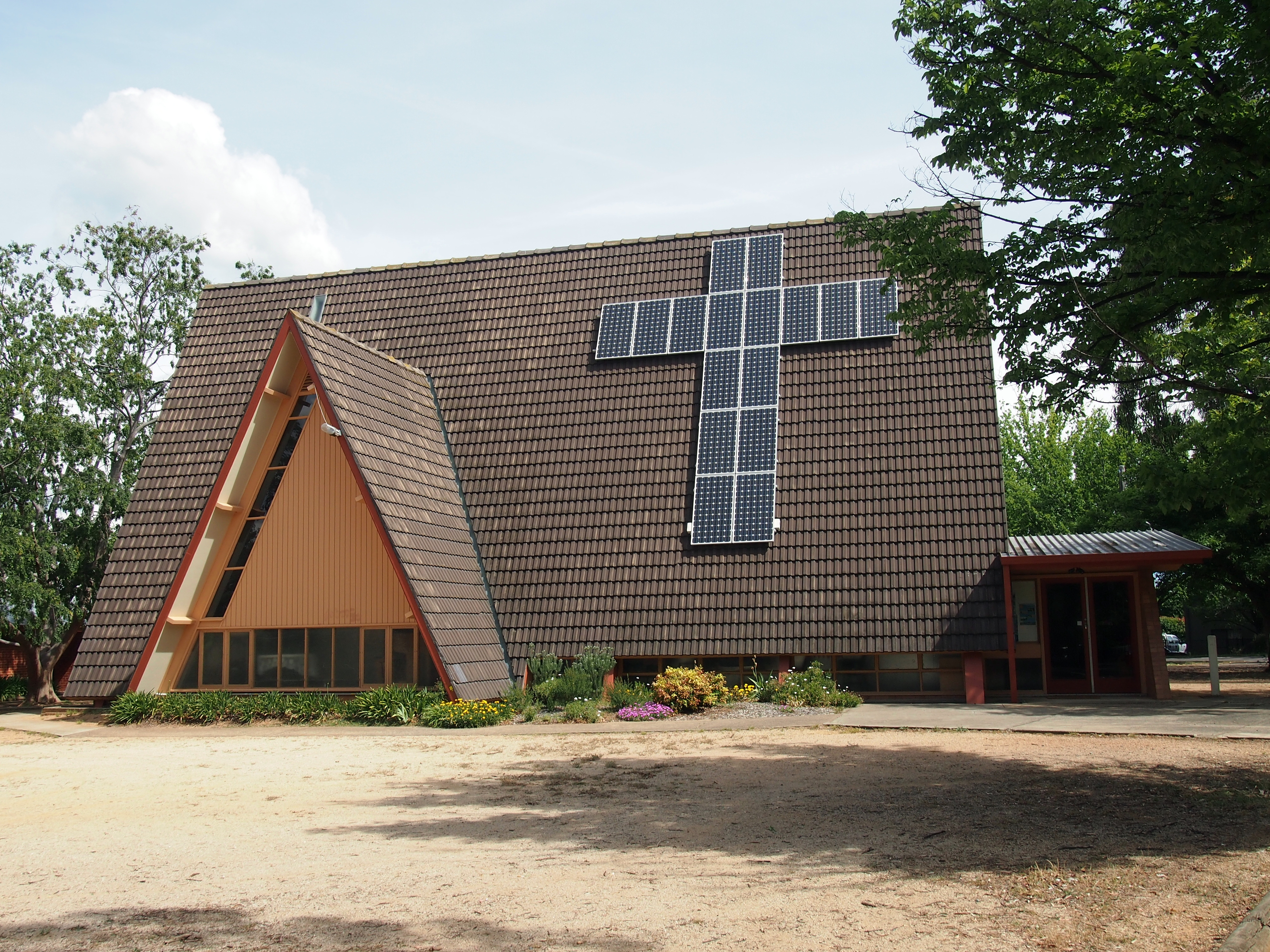
O'Connor Uniting Church with solar panels

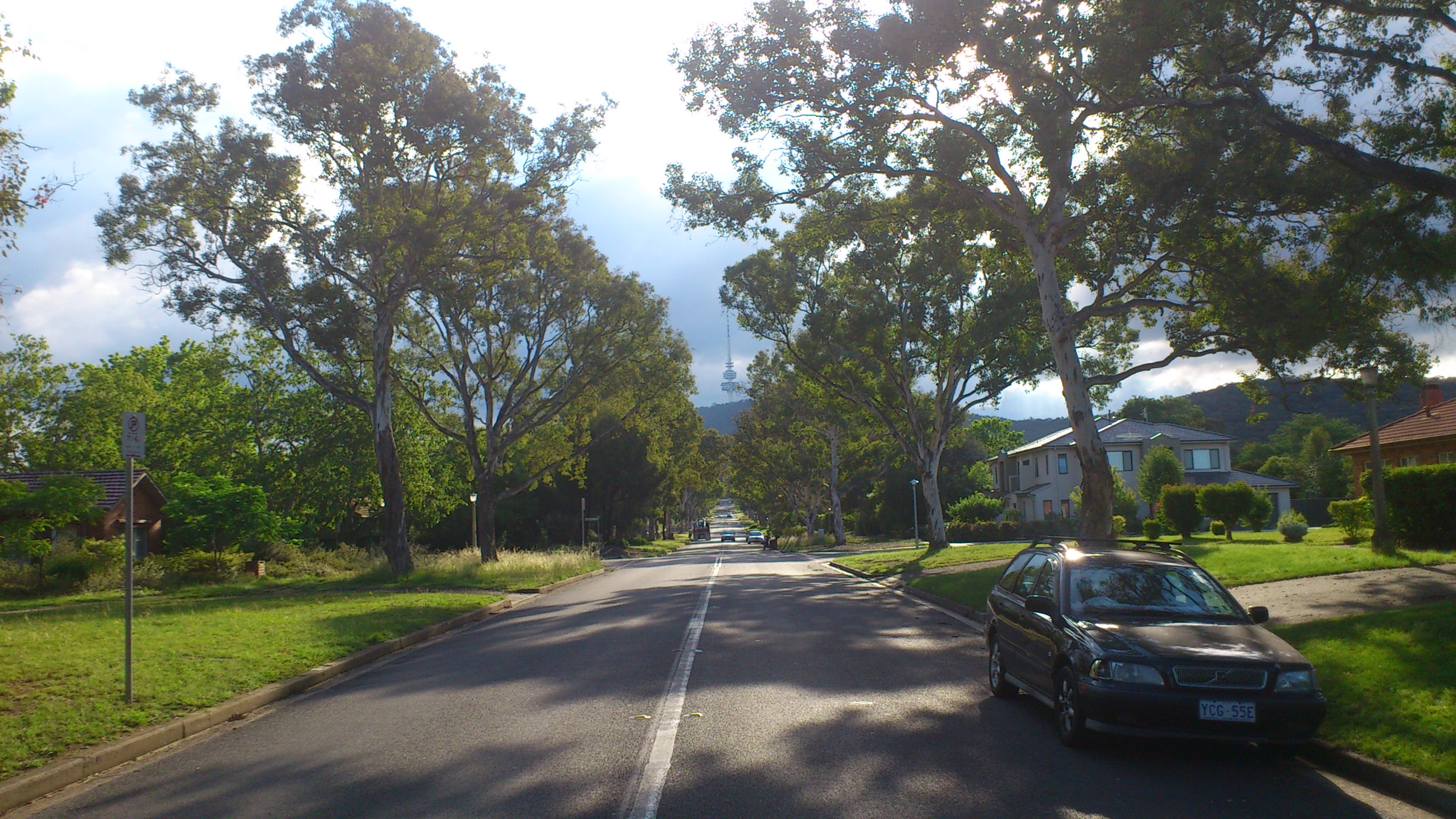
David Street, looking south west, the boundary street between Turner and O'Connor.

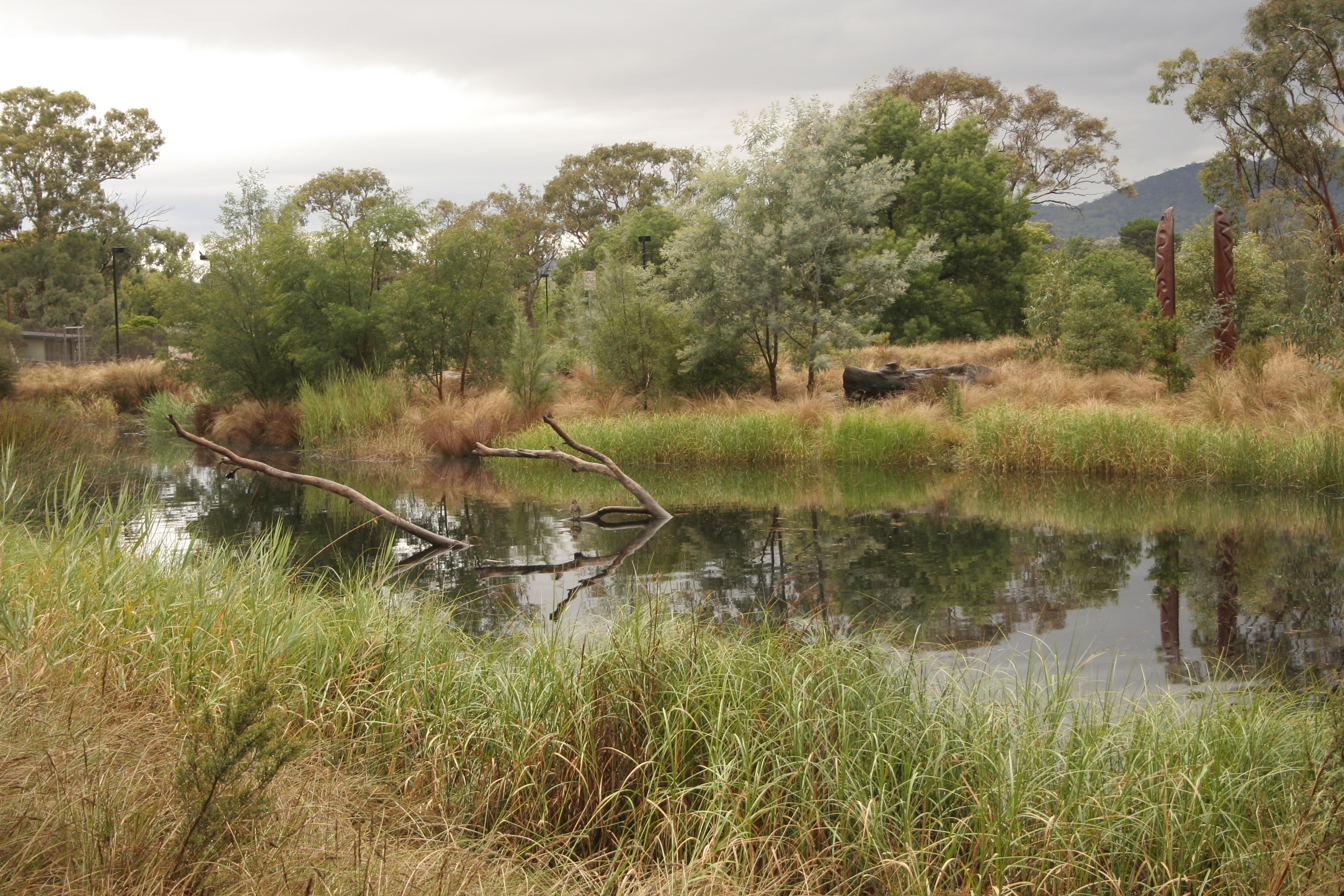
Banksia Street wetland in northern O'Connor

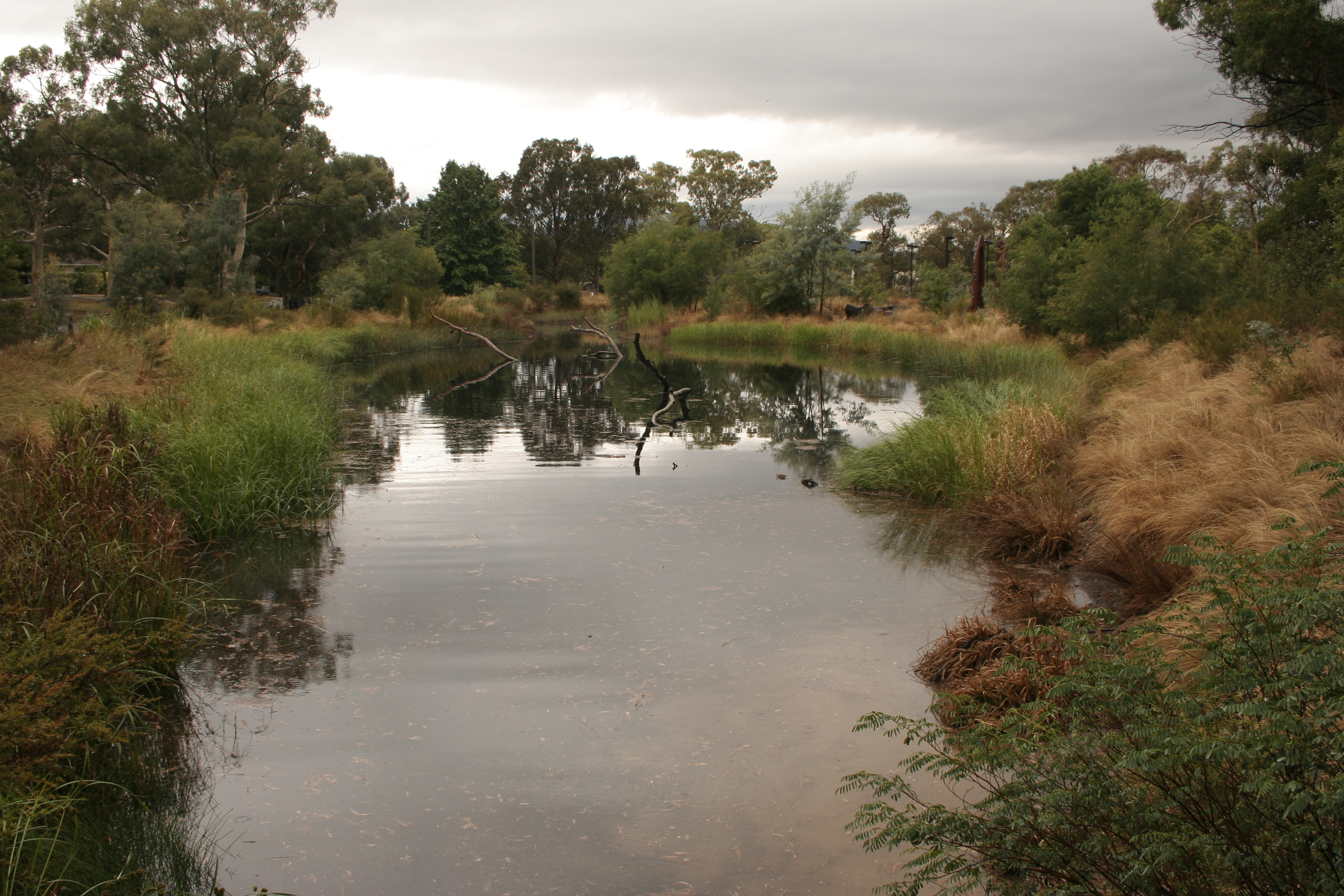
Banksia Street wetland

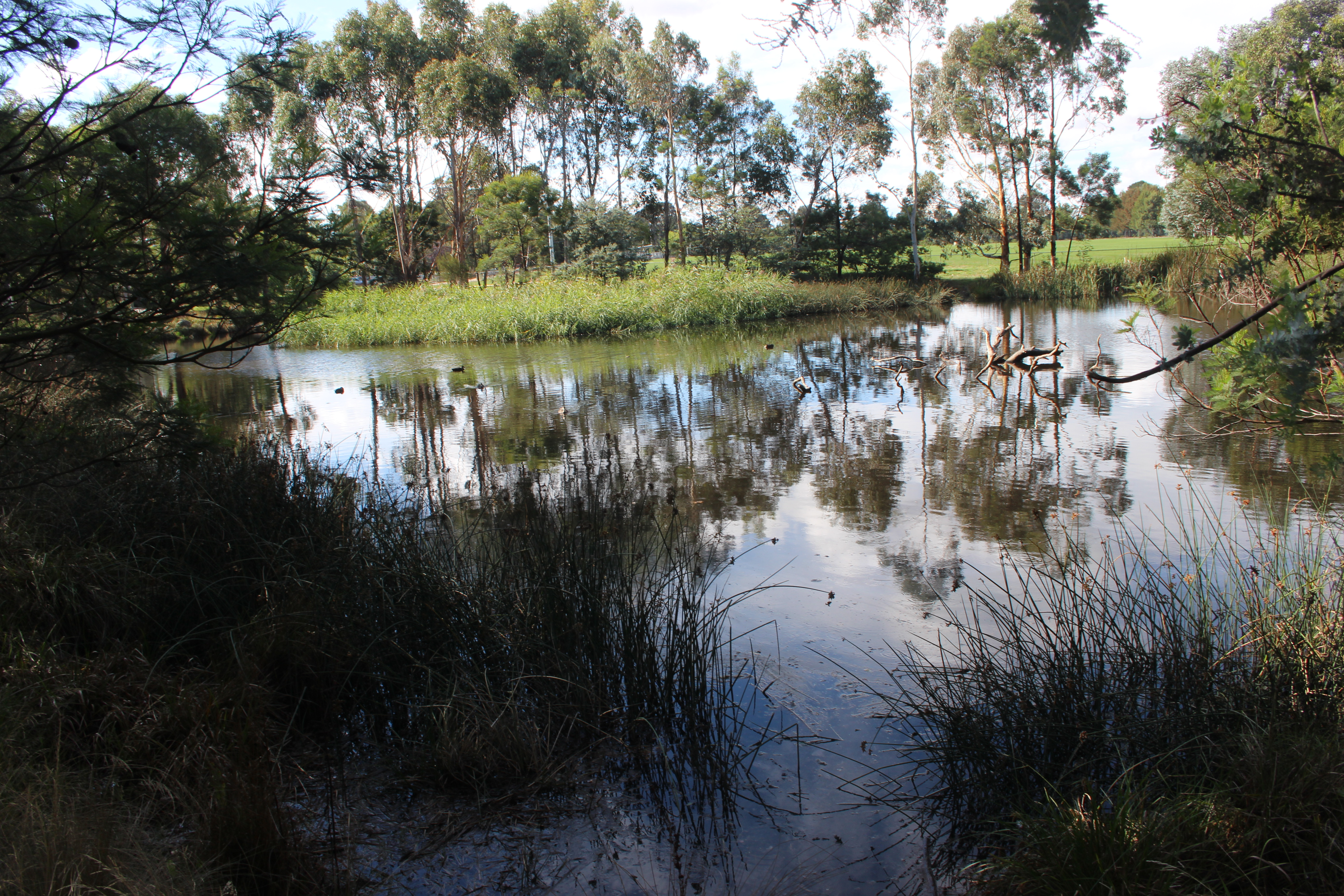
David Street wetland in southern O'Connor

== Education ==
O'Connor residents get preference for:

- O'Connor Co-Operative School
- Depending on the address: Lyneham Primary or Turner Primary
- Lyneham High School
- Dickson College

== External links and resources ==
- Boland-Rudder, Hamish (31 January 2014). "A weekend in your suburb: 36 hours in O'Connor". The Canberra Times. Fairfax Media. Archived from the original on 31 January 2014.
- St Philip's Church
- St Joseph's School, archived from the original on 25 October 2005
- O'Connor Cooperative School
