= RAAF Station Tocumwal =

RAAF Station Tocumwal
- Tocumwal, New South Wales in Australia

Site information
- Type: Military airfield
- Owner: Australian Air Board; Australian Defence Force
- Operator: Royal Australian Air Force

Location
- Shown within Australia Tocumwal Airfield (Australia)
- Coordinates: 35°48′34″S 145°36′17″E

Site history
- Built: February 1942
- In use: 1942 - 1960
- Fate: Abandoned
- Battles/wars: Pacific War

RAAF Station Tocumwal (35°48′S 145°34′E) was a major Royal Australian Air Force base during World War II. Located near the town of Tocumwal, New South Wales the base was established in early 1942 to provide a secure base for United States Army Air Forces heavy bomber units. While the USAAF does not appear to have used the base, it was heavily used by the RAAF and, from 1944, was home to the RAAF's heavy bomber support and operational conversion units including No. 7 Operational Training Unit.

While RAAF Station Tocumwal was closed following World War II the airfield remains in use and is a renowned gliding site. In the immediate post-WW2 era Tocumwal was used as the RAAF's main aircraft storage and disposal base. Many hundreds of Australian military aircraft made their last flights being ferried to Tocumwal, where they were sold to scrap metal dealers and melted down to ingots in smelters set up on the airfield.

== History ==
At the end of January 1942, the U.S. Army chose Tocumwal, NSW as the location for a strategic Aircraft Maintenance and Supply Depot. By 21 February 1942, construction work had commenced. Construction was undertaken by multiple NSW and Victorian State agencies under the management of the Allied Works Council. A labour force consisted of over 3,000 personnel, the majority from the newly formed Civil Construction Corps. By May 1942, aspects of the depot were complete and U.S. forces began to occupy the base. The airfield was equipped with four 6,000 foot long runways, 70 miles worth of taxiways and road with aircraft dispersals, 6 large wooden hangars, over 500 buildings, engine test bays, and a 300-bed hospital. Subsequently, the United States Army Air Forces began using the airfield. General George Kenney is reputed to have said "Mighty fine base – now shift it 2,000 miles closer to the enemy" during an inspection of the airfield.

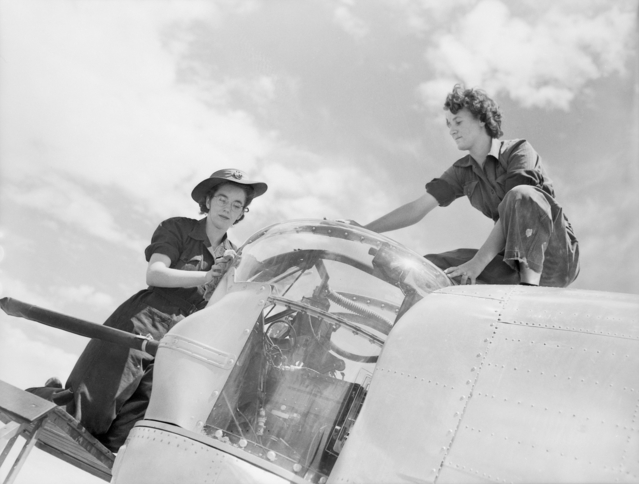
Two members of the Women's Auxiliary Australian Air Force working on a B-24 Liberator at Tocumwal in 1944

=== RAAF usage ===
On 9 November, 1942, the Royal Australian Air Force took over operations, and renamed it to RAAF Station Tocumwal. At peak operations, approximately 5,000 RAAF personnel and 550 Women’s Auxiliary Australian Air Force (WAAAF) personnel were stationed at Tocumwal Airfield. In March 1946, RAAF Station Tocumwal was disbanded and became a Care and Maintenance Unit.

=== Post-war ===
200 houses from the base were relocated to Canberra in 1946 to address a housing shortage. The vast majority were relocated to a small precinct in the suburb of O'Connor, and in 2004 were added to the ACT Heritage Register.

On 14 October, 1960, the RAAF closed the base at Tocumwal, leaving 50 aircraft for disposal organised by the Department of Supply. A closing ceremony was held, and was attended by Captain G. Pither and six officers from RAAF Base Laverton, and 60 Tocumwal residents. The Air Force flag was lowered for the final time at 10:15 AM, and was presented to the local community to be displayed at the local memorial hall. On 15 October, 1960, ownership of the airfield was transferred to the Department of Civil Aviation. The remaining four large wooden hangars were used for storage, including wheat and grain stocks and later a dozen Republic of Singapore Air Force Hawker Hunters acquired by an Australian dealer.

== Units ==
The following lists the units that were based at RAAF Station Tocumwal:

RAAF

- No. 7 Operational Training Unit RAAF, October 1943
- No. 5 Operational Training Unit RAAF, February 1944
- No. 7 Aircraft Depot
- No. 7 Central Recovery Depot
- No. 1 Aircraft Depot detachment B, 26 June 1950 - 1 October 1960
