= Tocumwal houses =

Heritage-listed houses in O'Connor, Australian Capital Territory

Coordinates: 35.26076°S 149.11740°E

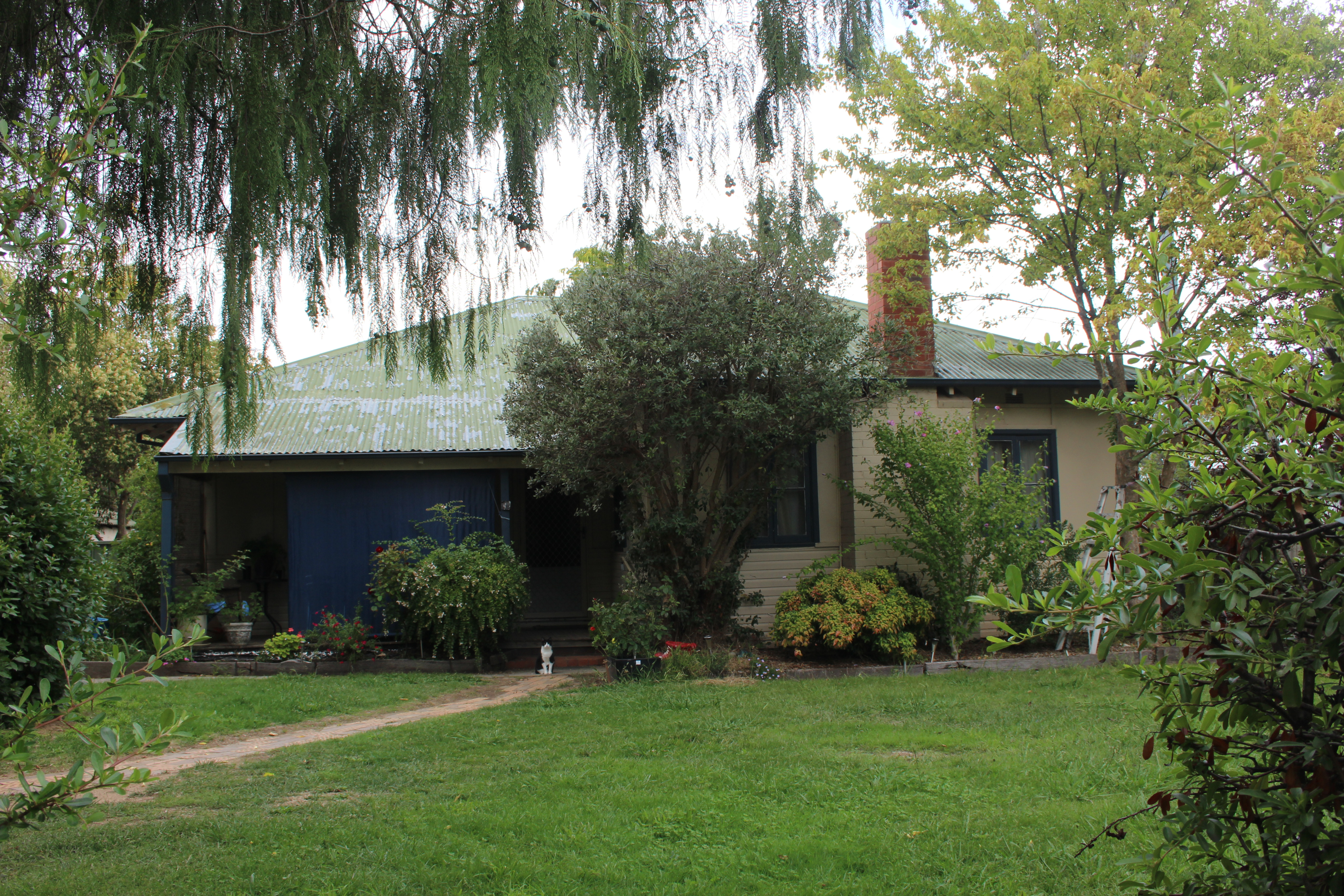
A Tocumwal house in O'Connor.

Tocumwal houses refers to a type of house in Canberra, the capital city of Australia. The houses, originally sited in the southern New South Wales town of Tocumwal were relocated to Canberra in the 1940s to address a housing shortage. The vast majority of the approximately 200 houses were relocated to a small precinct of the Canberra suburb of O'Connor. This area—covering 8 small cul-de-sacs,—is known as the Tocumwal Heritage Precinct.

The precinct was added to the Australian Capital Territory Heritage Register in 1998 and the ACT Heritage Register under the Heritage Act of 2004.
