= No. 7 Operational Training Unit RAAF =

Bomber training unit in Australia

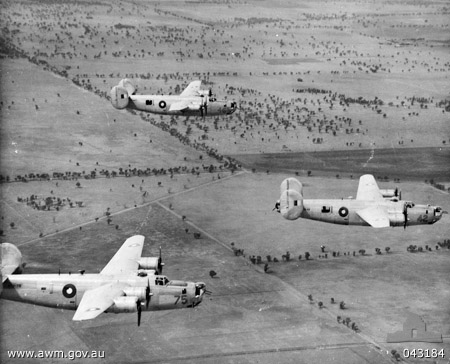
Three 7OTU Liberators in formation

No. 7 Operational Training Unit RAAF (7OTU) was a Royal Australian Air Force heavy bomber training unit of World War II. 7OTU was formed on 12 February 1944 at RAAF Station Tocumwal in southern New South Wales to train RAAF B-24 Liberator crews. 7OTU was initially equipped with ex-USAAF B-24Ds but later received new B-24J/L/Ms. At full strength the unit was equipped with 54 B-24s and was responsible for training 28 crews per month. 7OTU was disbanded following the end of the war.

In 1944 one of the few verified instances of sabotage occurred at Tocumwal, when major sections of the wiring looms in 12 B-24s were cut and removed. This put the aircraft out of service for several months until the damage could be assessed, replacement looms fabricated in the US, then installed by Consolidated technicians flown to Australia to do the work. The sabotage was believed to have been carried out by a Japanese cell that had been under cover in Australia since prior to the war, however no one was ever captured nor convicted of the act.

== See also ==
- B-24 Liberators in Australian service
